= List of World War I Central Powers aircraft =

This is a list of military aircraft used by the Central Powers in World War I

== Austro-Hungarian aircraft ==
Built specifically for or in Austria-Hungary, whose designation system was based on the German one, but with duplications for unrelated designs. German designs used by Austria-Hungary and Germany are in German section.

=== A & B types (unarmed monoplanes and biplanes) ===
- Aviatik B.III (1916)
- Etrich Taube (1911)
- Fokker B.I (1915)
- Fokker B.II (1916)
- Fokker B.III – reconnaissance/fighter
- Hansa-Brandenburg B.I (1914)
- Lohner B.I (1912)
- Lohner B.II (1913)
- Lohner B.III
- Lohner B.IV
- Lohner B.V
- Lohner B.VI
- Lohner B.VII (1915)

=== C types (armed two seat biplanes) ===
- Aviatik (Ö) C.I (1916)
- Hansa-Brandenburg C.I
- Knoller C.I (1916)
- Knoller C.II (1916)
- Lloyd C.I (1914)
- Lloyd C.II (1915)
- Lloyd C.III
- Lloyd C.IV
- Lloyd C.V (1917)
- Lohner C.I (1916)
- Phonix C.I (1918)

=== D types (Doppeldecker – armed single seaters) ===
- Aviatik (Berg) D.I (1917)
- Aviatik (Berg) D.II (1917)
- Hansa-Brandenburg D.I (1916)
- Phönix D.I (1917)
- Phönix D.II
- Phönix D.III
- Fokker Dr.I triplane

=== G types (Grossflugzeuge – large bombers) ===
- Hansa-Brandenburg G.I (1917)

=== Seaplanes ===
- Lohner L (1915)
- Hansa-Brandenburg CC (1916) (Note: Designed for Austria-Hungary and operated by both Germany and Austria-Hungary)
- Hansa-Brandenburg W.13

== Bulgarian aircraft ==
Lacking an indigenous aviation industry capable of producing military aircraft, Bulgaria primarily relied on Germany for aircraft.

== German aircraft ==
=== A & B types (unarmed monoplanes and biplanes) ===
- AEG B.I (1914)
- AEG B.II (1914)
- AEG B.III (1915)
- Albatros B.I (1913)
- Albatros B.II (1914)
- Albatros B.III (1915)
- Aviatik B.I (1914)
- Aviatik B.II (1914)
- BFW Monoplane 1918
- DFW B.I (1914)
- DFW B.II
- DFW Mars (1913)
- Euler B.I
- Euler B.II
- Euler B.III
- Fokker A.I
- Fokker A.II
- Fokker A.III (1915)
- Fokker M.7
- Germania type B (1915)
- Gödecker B type
- Gotha LD.1/2/6/7
- Gotha LD.5
- Gotha LE.3 Taube
- Halberstadt type B
- Halberstadt B.I
- Halberstadt B.II
- Halberstadt B.III
- Hannuschke monoplane (1915)
- Jeannin Taube (1914)
- Jeannin biplane (1915)
- LVG B.I
- LVG B.II
- LVG B.III
- NFW B.I
- Otto pusher (1914)
- Otto B.I (1914)
- Pfalz A.I & A.II (license-built Morane-Saulnier L)
- Rumpler Taube (1911)
- Rumpler 4A/B.I
- Sablatnig B.I

=== C types (armed two seat biplanes) ===
- AEG C.I (1915)
- AEG C.II (1915)
- AEG C.III
- AEG C.IV
- AEG C.V
- AEG C.VI
- AEG C.VII
- AEG C.VIII
- AEG C.VIII Dr – reconnaissance triplane
- AGO C.I
- AGO C.II
- AGO C.III
- AGO C.IV
- AGO C.VII
- AGO C.VIII
- Albatros C.I (1915)
- Albatros C.II
- Albatros C.III (1916)
- Albatros C.IV
- Albatros C.V
- Albatros C.VI
- Albatros C.VII
- Albatros C.VIII
- Albatros C.IX
- Albatros C.X
- Albatros C.XII
- Albatros C.XIII
- Albatros C.XIV
- Albatros C.XV
- Aviatik C.I (1916)
- Aviatik C.II
- Aviatik C.III
- Aviatik C.V
- Aviatik C.VI
- Aviatik C.VII
- Aviatik C.VIII
- Aviatik C.IX
- DFW C.I
- DFW C.II
- DFW C.IV
- DFW C.V
- DFW C.VI
- Euler C
- Fokker C.I
- Friedrichshafen C.I
- Germania C.I
- Germania C.II
- Germania C.IV
- Halberstadt C.I
- Halberstadt C.III
- Halberstadt C.V
- Halberstadt C.VII
- Halberstadt C.VIII
- Halberstadt C.IX
- Hannover C.I (license-built Aviatik C.I)
- LFG Roland C.II (1916)
- LFG Roland C.III
- LFG Roland C.V
- LFG Roland C.VIII
- LVG C.I
- LVG C.II (1916)
- LVG C.III
- LVG C.IV
- LVG C.V
- LVG C.VI
- LVG C.VII
- LVG C.VIII
- LVG C.IX
- Otto C.I (1915)
- Otto C.II
- Pfalz C.I (license-built Rumpler C.IV)
- Rumpler C.I & Ia
- Rumpler C.III
- Rumpler C.IV
- Rumpler C.V
- Rumpler C.VI
- Rumpler C.VII
- Rumpler C.VIII
- Rumpler C.IX
- Rumpler C.X
- Sablatnig C.I
- Sablatnig C.II
- Sablatnig C.III

=== CL types (close support & two seat fighters) ===
- BFW CL.I
- BFW CL.II
- BFW CL.III
- Daimler CL.I
- Halberstadt CL.II
- Halberstadt CL.IV
- Halberstadt CLS.I
- Hannover CL.II
- Hannover CL.III
- Hannover CL.IV
- Hannover CL.V
- Junkers CL.I (1917)

=== D types (Doppeldecker – armed single seaters) ===
- AEG D.I (1917)
- AGO DV.3 (1915)
- Albatros D.I (1916)
- Albatros D.II (1916)
- Albatros D.III (1916) (Note: Also built in Austria-Hungary)
- Albatros D.IV (1916)
- Albatros D.V & Va (1917)
- Albatros D.VI
- Albatros D.VII
- Albatros D.VIII
- Albatros D.IX (1918)
- Albatros D.X
- Albatros D.XI (1918)
- Albatros D.XII (1918)
- Aviatik D.I (license-built Halberstadt D.II)
- Aviatik D.II (1916)
- Aviatik D.III (1917)
- Aviatik D.IV
- Aviatik D.V
- Aviatik D.VI (1918)
- Aviatik D.VII (1918)
- Caspar D.I
- Daimler D.I (1918)
- Daimler D.II
- DFW D.I
- DFW D.II
- Euler D.I (1916)(copy of Nieuport)
- Euler D.II
- Fokker D.I (1916)
- Fokker D.II (1916)
- Fokker D.III (1916)
- Fokker D.IV (1916)
- Fokker D.V (1916)
- Fokker D.VI (1918)
- Fokker D.VII (1918)
- Fokker D.VIII (monoplane originally E.V) (1918)
- Friedrichshafen D.I
- Friedrichshafen D.II
- Germania type C/K.D.D.
- Halberstadt D.I
- Halberstadt D.II (1915)
- Halberstadt D.III (1916)
- Halberstadt D.IV
- Halberstadt D.V (1916)
- Junkers D.I (1918)
- Kondor D.6 (1918)
- Kondor D.7 (1918)
- LFG Roland D.I (1916)
- LFG Roland D.II & IIa (1916)
- LFG Roland D.III (1916)
- LFG Roland D.IV (also designated Dr.I) (1917)
- LFG Roland D.V
- LFG Roland D.VI (1917)
- LFG Roland D.VII (1918)
- LFG Roland D.VIII (1918)
- LFG Roland D.IX (1917)
- LFG Roland D.XIII
- LFG Roland D.XIV
- LFG Roland D.XV (1918)
- LFG Roland D.XVI (1918)
- LFG Roland D.XVII (1918)
- LVG D.II
- LVG D.III
- LVG D.IV
- LVG D.V
- LVG D.VI
- Märkische D.I
- Naglo D.II (1918)
- Pfalz D type
- Pfalz D.I (license-built LFG Roland D.I) (1916)
- Pfalz D.II & IIa (license-built LFG Roland D.II) (1916)
- Pfalz D.III & IIIa (1917)
- Pfalz D.IV
- Pfalz D.VI (1917)
- Pfalz D.VII (1917)
- Pfalz D.VIII (1918)
- Pfalz D.XII (1918)
- Pfalz D.XIV
- Pfalz D.XV (1918)
- Rumpler D.I
- Siemens-Schuckert D.I (1916)
- Siemens-Schuckert D.III (1918)
- Siemens-Schuckert D.IV (1918)
- Zeppelin-Lindau D.I (1918)

=== Dr & F types (Dreidecker – triplane fighters) ===
- AEG Dr.I (1917)
- Albatros Dr.I
- Albatros Dr.II
- Aviatik Dr.I
- DFW Dr.I
- Euler Dr.I
- Fokker Dr.I (also designated F.I) (1917)
- Pfalz Dr.I (1917)
- Pfalz Dr.II (1918)
- Siemens-Schuckert DDr.I (1917)

=== E types (Eindecker – armed monoplanes) ===
- Fokker E.I (1915)
- Fokker E.II (1915)
- Fokker E.III (1916) (Note: Also used in Austria-Hungary)
- Fokker E.IV (1916)
- Fokker E.V (later redesignated D.VIII)
- Junkers E.I (1916)
- Kondor E.III (1918)
- LVG E.I (reconnaissance monoplane) (1915)
- NFW E.I
- NFW E.II (1917)
- Pfalz E.I (1915)
- Pfalz E.II (1915)
- Pfalz E.III (converted Pfalz A.II) (1916)
- Pfalz E.IV (1915)
- Pfalz E.V (1916)
- Pfalz E.VI (1916)
- Siemens-Schuckert E.I

=== G & K types Grossflugzeuge ===
Large bombers, originally Kampfflugzeuge (battleplanes)

- AEG G.I/K.I (1915)
- AEG G.II (1915)
- AEG G.III (1915)
- AEG G.IV (1916)
- AEG G.V (1918)
- Albatros G.I (1916)
- Albatros G.II (1916)
- Albatros G.III (1916)
- Aviatik G.I
- Aviatik G.III
- Fokker K.I
- Friedrichshafen G.I (1915)
- Friedrichshafen G.II (1916)
- Friedrichshafen G.III & IIIa (1917)
- Friedrichshafen G.IV (1918)
- Friedrichshafen G.V (1918)
- Gotha G.I (1915)
- Gotha G.II (1916)
- Gotha G.III (1916)
- Gotha G.IV (1916)
- Gotha G.V (1917)
- Gotha G.VI (1918)
- Gotha G.VII/GL.VII (1918)
- Gotha G.VIII/GL.VIII (1918)
- Gotha G.IX (1918)
- Gotha G.X (1918)
- Halberstadt G.I
- LFG Roland G.I
- LVG G.I
- LVG G.II
- LVG G.III (aka Schütte-Lanz G.V) (1918)
- Rumpler G.I (1915)
- Rumpler G.II
- Rumpler G.III
- Schütte-Lanz G.I (1915)
- Schütte-Lanz G.V (aka LVG G.III)
- Siemens-Schuckert Forssman (1915)

=== J types (ground attack) ===
- AEG PE (1918)
- AEG DJ.I
- AEG J.I (1916)
- AEG J.II (1918)
- AGO S.I (1918?)
- Albatros J.I
- Albatros J.II
- Albatros J.III
- Junkers CL.I (1918)
- Junkers J.I

=== L types (bombers) ===
- Siemens-Schuckert L.I (1918)

=== N types (nachtflugzeuge – night bombers) ===
- AEG C.IVN
- AEG N.I (1917)
- Albatros C.VIII N
- Albatros N.I (C.VII variant)
- BFW N.I
- Friedrichshafen N.I
- Sablatnig N.I

=== R types (Riesenflugzeuge – giant bombers) ===
- AEG R.I (1916)
- Aviatik R.III
- DFW R.I (1916)
- DFW R.II (1918)
- Linke-Hofmann R.I (1917)
- Linke-Hofmann R.II (1919)
- Siemens-Schuckert R.I (1915)
- Siemens-Schuckert R.II (1915)
- Siemens-Schuckert R.III (1915)
- Siemens-Schuckert R.IV (1916)
- Siemens-Schuckert R.V (1916)
- Siemens-Schuckert R.VI (1916)
- Siemens-Schuckert R.VII (1917)
- Siemens-Schuckert R.VIII (did not fly)
- Zeppelin-Staaken V.G.O.I (1915)
- Zeppelin-Staaken V.G.O.II (1915)
- Zeppelin-Staaken V.G.O.III (1915)
- Zeppelin-Staaken R.IV (1915)
- Zeppelin-Staaken R.V (1915)
- Zeppelin-Staaken R.VI (1916)
- Zeppelin-Staaken R.VII (1917)
- Zeppelin-Staaken R.XIV (1918)
- Zeppelin-Staaken R.XV (1918)
- Zeppelin-Staaken R.XVI (1918)
- Zeppelin-Lindau Rs.I (did not fly)
- Zeppelin-Lindau Rs.II (1916)
- Zeppelin-Lindau Rs.III (1917)
- Zeppelin-Lindau Rs.IV (1918)

=== W types and other seaplanes (Wasser – floatplane) ===
- Albatros W.1 (reconnaissance)
- Albatros W.2 (reconnaissance)
- Albatros W.3 (torpedo bomber)
- Albatros W.4 (1916)(fighter)
- Albatros W.5 (torpedo bomber)
- Albatros W.8 (1918)(fighter)
- Caspar U.1 (U-boat aircraft)
- Friedrichshafen FF.33 (reconnaissance)
- Friedrichshafen FF.49 (reconnaissance)
- Gotha WD.1 (reconnaissance)
- Gotha WD.2/5/9/12/13/15 (reconnaissance)
- Gotha WD.3 (reconnaissance)
- Gotha WD.7 (reconnaissance)
- Gotha WD.8 (reconnaissance)
- Gotha WD.11 (torpedo bomber)
- Gotha WD.14/20/22 (torpedo bombers)
- Gotha WD.27 (reconnaissance)
- Hansa-Brandenburg FB
- Hansa-Brandenburg GDW (torpedo bomber)
- Hansa-Brandenburg GNW (reconnaissance)
- Hansa-Brandenburg GW (torpedo bomber)
- Hansa-Brandenburg KW (reconnaissance)
- Hansa-Brandenburg KDW (fighter)
- Hansa-Brandenburg LW (reconnaissance)
- Hansa-Brandenburg NW (reconnaissance)
- Hansa-Brandenburg W (reconnaissance)
- Hansa-Brandenburg W.11 (fighter)
- Hansa-Brandenburg W.12 (1917)(fighter)
- Hansa-Brandenburg W.19 (reconnaissance)
- Hansa-Brandenburg W.20 (fighter)
- Hansa-Brandenburg W.27 (fighter)
- Hansa-Brandenburg W.29 (1918)(fighter)
- Hansa-Brandenburg W.32 (fighter)
- Hansa-Brandenburg W.33 (fighter)
- Junkers CLS.I (fighter)
- Kaiserliche Werft Danzig 404 (trainer)
- Kaiserliche Werft Danzig 467 (trainer)
- Kaiserliche Werft Danzig 1105 (trainer)
- Kaiserliche Werft Danzig 1650 (reconnaissance)
- Kaiserliche Werft Kiel 463 (trainer)
- Kaiserliche Werft Wilhelmshaven 401 (trainer)
- Kaiserliche Werft Wilhelmshaven 461 (trainer)
- Kaiserliche Werft Wilhelmshaven 945 (fighter)
- Kaiserliche Werft Wilhelmshaven 947 (reconnaissance)
- LFG Roland WD (1917)(fighter)
- LFG Roland W (reconnaissance)
- Lübeck-Travemünde F.1 (reconnaissance)
- Lübeck-Travemünde F.2 (reconnaissance)
- Lübeck-Travemünde F.3/844 (fighter)
- Lübeck-Travemünde F.4 (reconnaissance)
- Oertz W 4
- Oertz W 5
- Oertz W 6
- Oertz W 7
- Oertz W 8
- Rumpler 4E (1914)
- Rumpler 6B (1916)(fighter/reconnaissance)
- Sablatnig SF-1 (reconnaissance)
- Sablatnig SF-2 (reconnaissance)
- Sablatnig SF-3 (fighter)
- Sablatnig SF-4 (fighter)
- Sablatnig SF-5 (reconnaissance)
- Sablatnig SF-7 (fighter)
- Sablatnig SF-8 (trainer)

=== Experimental ===
- Albatros C.II
- Albatros L 3 (single seat reconnaissance)
- Albatros L 9 (single seat reconnaissance)
- Alter Type AI – fighter
- Daimler L8 (fighter)
- Daimler L9 (fighter)
- Daimler L11 (fighter)
- Daimler L14 (fighter)
- DFW T.28 Floh (fighter)
- Euler D (fighter)
- Euler Dr.2 (fighter)
- Euler Dr.3 (fighter)
- Euler Dr.4 (fighter)
- Euler Pusher Einsitzer (fighter)
- Euler Quadruplane (fighter)
- Fokker M.6 (1914)
- Fokker V.1 (1916) (fighter)
- Fokker V.2 (fighter)
- Fokker V.8 (5 wing fighter)
- Fokker V.9 (fighter)
- Fokker V.17 (fighter)
- Fokker V.20 (fighter)
- Fokker V.23 (fighter)
- Fokker V.25 (fighter)
- Fokker V.27 (fighter)
- Germania JM (1916) (unarmed single seater)
- Hansa-Brandenburg L.14 (fighter)
- Hansa-Brandenburg L.16 (fighter)
- Junkers J 1 (1915) (first all-metal aircraft)
- Junkers J 2/E.I (1916)
- LFG V 19 Straslund (submarine aircraft)
- Rex 1915 Scout (1915)
- Rex 1916 Scout (1916)
- Rex 1917 Scout (1917)
- Rumpler 7D (fighter)
- Siemens-Schuckert D.II (1917)(experimental)
- Siemens-Schuckert L.I (1918)
- Zeppelin-Lindau (Dornier) V1 (1916)

== Ottoman aircraft ==
Lacking an indigenous aviation industry, the Ottoman Empire primarily relied on Germany for aircraft, although a number of French pre-war aircraft were used in the early part of the war. The Ottoman Empire also operated two Avro 504 light fighter reconnaissance aircraft. Later on, they were used as trainer aircraft.

== See also ==
- Idflieg aircraft designation system
- List of military aircraft of Germany
- List of World War I Entente aircraft
