= Roland C.VIII =

WWI German reconnaissance aircraft

C.VIII

General information
- Type: Reconnaissance Aircraft
- Manufacturer: Luft-Fahrzeug-Gesellschaft G.m.b.H. (LFG Roland)
- Number built: 1

History
- First flight: 1917

The LFG Roland C.VIII was a German reconnaissance aircraft of World War I. It was manufactured by Luft-Fahrzeug-Gesellschaft G.m.b.H.

The C.VIII was basically a C.III with a modified fuselage and a Mercedes D.IVa engine. Although the aircraft passed flight tests, the onset of Albatros C.X aircraft, license built by LFG Roland, meant that the C.VIII did not enter production.

== Specifications ==
Data from

General characteristics

- Crew: 2
- Length: 7.72 m (25 ft 4 in)
- Wingspan: 10.32 m (33 ft 10 in)
- Height: 2.92 m (9 ft 7 in)
- Wing area: 26.4 m^{2} (284 sq ft)
- Empty weight: 786 kg (1,733 lb)
- Gross weight: 1,344 kg (2,963 lb)
- Powerplant: 1 × Mercedes D.IVa 6-cylinder water-cooled in-line piston engine, 190 kW (260 hp) ;alternatively 1 x Maybach Mb.IV 245 hp (183 kW)
- Propellers: 2-bladed wooden fixed pitchpropeller

Performance

- Maximum speed: 180 km/h (110 mph, 97 kn)
- Cruise speed: 160 km/h (99 mph, 86 kn)
- Endurance: 4 hours
- Service ceiling: 5,200 m (17,100 ft)

Armament

- Guns: 1 x 7.92 mm (0.312 in) Parabellum MG14 machine gun on a ring mounting in rear turret, 1 x forward-firing synchronized 7.92 mm (0.312 in) LMG 08/15 Spandau machine gun
