= V17 =

V17 may refer to:

- Fokker V.17, a Dutch experimental fighter aircraft
- ITU-T V.17, a fax modem standard
- V-17 truck, an American pole derrick truck
- V17, a grade in bouldering
- V17, a family history of certain chronic disabling diseases, in the ICD-9 V codes
