= Halberstadt C.VIII =

WWI German reconnaissance biplane

General information
- Type: Reconnaissance aircraft
- Manufacturer: Halberstadt
- Status: Prototype only
- Primary user: Luftstreitkräfte
- Number built: 1

History
- First flight: 2 October 1918

The Halberstadt C.VIII was a prototype two-seat general-purpose biplane built by Halberstadt during World War I.

== Design and development ==
The C.VIII was a single-bay biplane of wooden construction with shortened wings, an elongated fuselage and a Maybach Mb.IV engine. Test flights were successful and the C.VIII was recommended for mass production, but the end of World War I meant that the C.VIII remained at the prototype stage.

== Specifications ==
Data from German and Austro-Hungarian aircraft manufacturers 1908-1918, German Aircraft of the First World War

General characteristics

- Crew: 2
- Length: 7.35 m (24 ft 1 in)
- Wingspan: 11.985 m (39 ft 4 in)
- Height: 2.95 m (9 ft 8 in)
- Wing area: 33 m^{2} (360 sq ft)
- Empty weight: 928 kg (2,046 lb)
- Gross weight: 1,363 kg (3,005 lb)
- Powerplant: 1 × Maybach Mb.IV 6-cylinder water-cooled in-line piston engine, 183 kW (245 hp)
- Propellers: 2-bladed wooden fixed-pitch propeller

Performance

- Maximum speed: 180 km/h (110 mph, 97 kn)
- Endurance: 3 hours 30 minutes
- Service ceiling: 9,000 m (30,000 ft)
- Time to altitude:

5,000 m (16,000 ft) in 21 minutes
9,000 m (30,000 ft) in 58 minutes

Armament

- Guns: 1x fixed forward firing synchronised 7.92 mm (0.312 in) LMG 08/15 Spandau machine gun and 1x flexibly mounted Parabellum MG14 in the rear cockpit

== See also ==
Related development

- Albatros B.II
- Albatros C.III

Aircraft of comparable role, configuration, and era

- Royal Aircraft Factory B.E.2
- LVG C.II
- Rumpler C.I

Related lists

- List of military aircraft of Germany
