= Albatros C.II =

German military biplane prototype

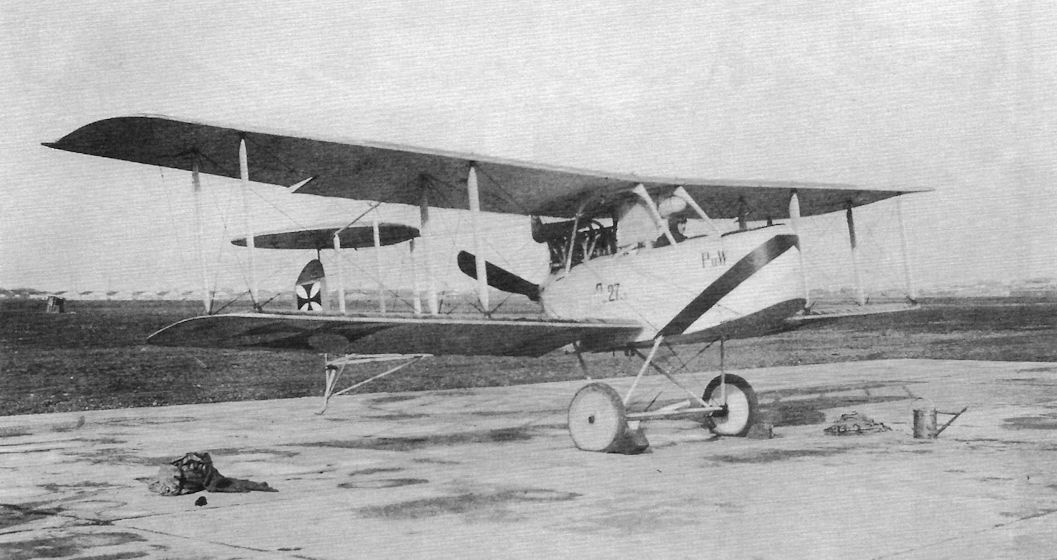

General information
- Type: Prototype
- National origin: Germany
- Manufacturer: Albatros Flugzeugwerke
- Number built: 1

History
- First flight: 1916
- Developed from: Albatros C.I

The Albatros C.II was a 1916 German military pusher biplane designed and built by Albatros Flugzeugwerke. Only one prototype was built and the type did not enter production.

== Design ==
The C.II used the wings and landing gear of the earlier C.I but was fitted with a short nacelle rather than a conventional fuselage. The nacelle housed a 150 hp (112 kW) Benz Bz.III engine in a pusher configuration with a two-bladed propeller. The nacelle had an open cockpit for the observer/gunner at the front and the pilot behind. The tail structure used an open frame with a conventional fin and rudder and garnered the nickname Gitterschwanz (en: lattice tail).

This aircraft should not be confused with the OAW C.II which was an unrelated aircraft produced in 1916 by Albatros’s subsidiary, Ostdeutsche Albatroswerke, at their factory in Schneidemühl. The two aircraft can be easily distinguished as the company's main factory at Johannisthal's design used a pusher configuration while the Schneidmühl one used a tractor configuration.

== Specifications ==
Data from German Aircraft of the First World War

General characteristics

- Crew: 2 (pilot, gunner/observer)
- Wingspan: 12.90 m (42 ft 4 in)
- Wing area: 40.50 m^{2} (435.9 sq ft)
- Powerplant: 1 × Benz Bz.III liquid-cooled inline engine, 110 kW (150 hp)
- Propellers: 2-bladed

== See also ==
Aircraft of comparable role, configuration, and era

- Airco DH.2
- Vickers F.B.5
- Voisin L

Related lists

- List of World War I Central Powers aircraft

== Bibliography ==
- Herris, Jack (2016). Albatros Aircraft of WWI: Volume 1: Early Two-Seaters: A Centennial Perspective on Great War Seaplanes. Great War Aviation Centennial Series. Vol. 24. n.p.: Aeronaut Books. ISBN 978-1-935881-47-6.
- Gray, Peter & Thetford, Owen (1987) [1970]. German Aircraft of the First World War (2nd ed.). London: Putnam. ISBN 0-85177-809-7.
- Treadwell, Terry C. (2010). German and Austro-Hungarian Aircraft Manufacturers 1908–1918. Amberley. ISBN 978-1-44560-102-1.
