= AEG C.VIII =

German reconnaissance biplane prototype

C.VIII
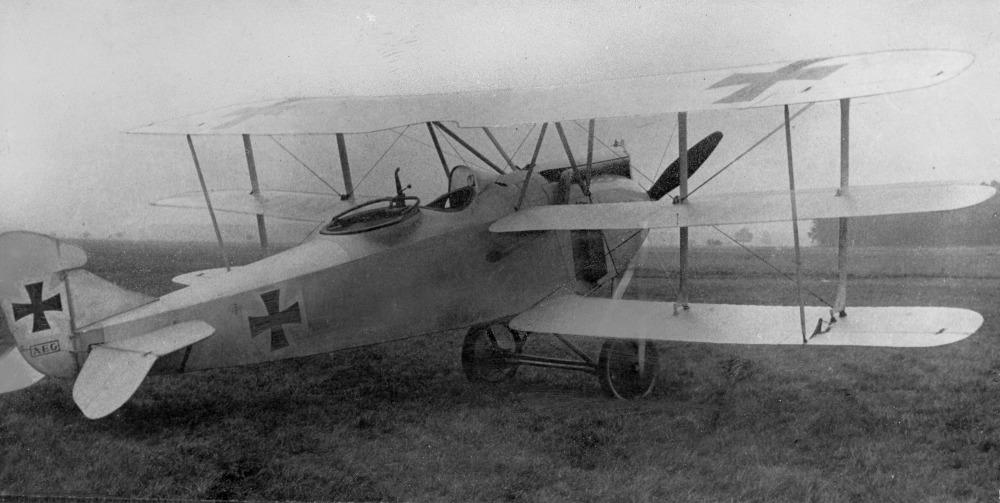

General information
- Type: Reconnaissance aircraft
- National origin: German Empire
- Manufacturer: AEG
- Primary user: Luftstreitkräfte
- Number built: 2

History
- First flight: October 1917
- Developed from: AEG C.VII

The AEG C.VIII was a prototype two-seat reconnaissance aircraft built by the Allgemeine Elektricitäts-Gesellschaft (AEG) during the First World War for the Imperial German Army's (Deutsches Heer) Imperial German Air Service (Luftstreitkräfte). Three examples were built in an effort to improve on the unsuccessful C.VII design, two of biplane configuration, the other a triplane (the latter sometimes referred to as the C.VIII.Dr). Neither version offered enough of an improvement over aircraft already in service to make mass production worthwhile.

== Development ==
The C.VII had been developed to the Inspectorate of Flying Troops (Inspektion der Fliegertruppen (Idflieg)'s requirement for a new type of two-seat aircraft, smaller than the existing C-type aircraft. These were to be used to equip protection flights (Schutzstaffeln) to escort reconnaissance aircraft. The C.VII had proven inferior to the submissions by Hannoversche Waggonfabrik and Halberstädter Flugzeugwerke, but AEG hoped that a more aerodynamic version of the C.VII might be successful. Idflieg ordered three prototypes in mid-1917 and AEG decided to build one as a triplane to appeal to Idflieg's fascination with triplanes at that time.

Changes to the C.VIII included new multi-wing spars, tall "ear"-type radiators mounted on the sides of the fuselage, a new tail structure with the horizontal stabilizers supported by two struts and a single interplane I-strut supporting the wings. The first of the biplanes was completed in July 1917. The triplane used the fuselage, engine and tail of the biplanes. An extra I-strut was added to support the extra weight of the wings. Neither design proved superior to the designs from other companies and they did not enter production.

== Variants ==
- C.VIII - Biplane prototype two-seater fighter/reconnaissance aircraft.
- C.VIII Dr - Triplane version of C.VIII, no improvement in climb and speed reduced to 165 km/h (103.12 mph)

== Specifications (C.VIII) ==
Data from German Aircraft of the First World War; A.E.G. Aircraft of WWI: A Centennial Perspective on Great War Airplanes

General characteristics

- Crew: 2
- Length: 6.2 m (20 ft 4 in)
- Upper wingspan: 9.5 m (31 ft 2 in)
- Lower wingspan: 9.1 m (29 ft 10 in)
- Wing area: 22.67 m^{2} (244.0 sq ft)
- Empty weight: 800 kg (1,764 lb)
- Gross weight: 1,160 kg (2,557 lb)
- Powerplant: 1 × Mercedes D.III water-cooled straight-six piston engine, 120 kW (160 hp)
- Propellers: 2-bladed fixed-pitch propeller

Performance

- Maximum speed: 170 km/h (110 mph, 92 kn)
- Time to altitude: 3.8 minutes to 1,000 m (3,300 ft)
- Power/mass: 0.10 kW/kg (0.061 hp/lb)

Armament

- Guns: 2 × 7.92 mm (0.312 in) Parabellum MG 14 machine guns

== See also ==
Aircraft of comparable role, configuration, and era

- Bristol F2b Fighter
- Halberstadt CL.II
- Hannover CL.II

Related lists

- List of military aircraft of Germany

== Bibliography ==
- Gray, Peter & Thetford, Owen (1987) [1970]. German Aircraft of the First World War (2nd ed.). London: Putnam. ISBN 0-85177-809-7.
- Herris, Jack (2015). A.E.G. Aircraft of WWI: A Centennial Perspective on Great War Airplanes. Great War Aviation Centennial Series. Vol. 16. n. p.: Aeronaut Books. ISBN 978-1-935881-28-5.
