= W27 =

W27 may refer to:

- Hansa-Brandenburg W.27, a German prototype fighter floatplane
- Second stellation of icosahedron
- W27 warhead, an American nuclear weapon
- Watkins 27, an American sailboat design
