= Zeppelin-Lindau Rs.II =

German Flying boat prototype

Rs.II
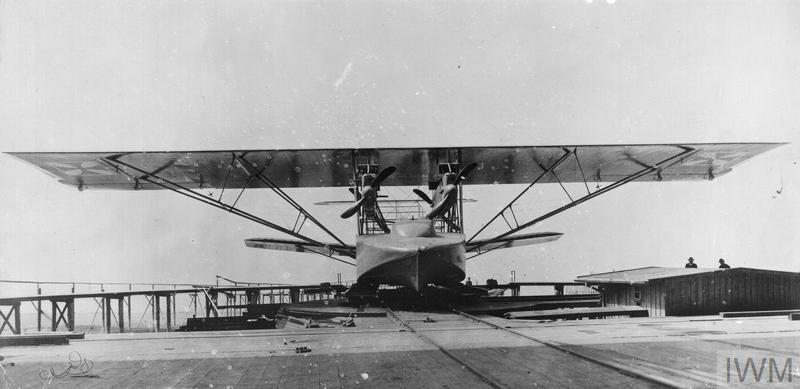
- A front view of the Zeppelin-Lindau Rs.II after its late 1916 rebuild

General information
- Type: Patrol flying boat
- National origin: Germany
- Manufacturer: Zeppelin-Lindau
- Designer: Claudius Dornier
- Number built: 1

The Zeppelin-Lindau Rs.II (known incorrectly postwar as the Dornier Rs.II) was a biplane flying boat, designed by Claudius Dornier as a follow-on to his Zeppelin-Lindau Rs.I and built during 1914–1915 on the German side of Lake Constance. Initially this aircraft was powered by three engines mounted inside the hull driving three pusher propellers via gearboxes and shafts. The later version was powered by four engines in two push-pull nacelles mounted between the wings.

== Design and development ==
After a disastrous storm which wrecked the Rs.I, Dornier continued development of large seaplanes with the Rs.II. The design and construction drawings of the Rs.II had been prepared during 1915 and the airframe was completed rapidly after the loss of the Rs.I. Although resembling the Rs.I, there was little in common with the Rs.II, which had a much broader, shorter hull, low aspect ratio upper wing and open lattice tail unit.

The Rs.II, (Navy serial no 1433), as launched in 1916, consisted of a sesquiplane flying boat with a short but very broad fuselage and a tail unit supported at the end of a long open lattice box framework of tubular booms cross braced with cables. The short lower wings were intended to support stabilizing floats but these were found unnecessary due to the inherent stability of the broad hull. The tail unit comprised a biplane elevator assembly with a small separate tailplane above a pair of all-flying rudders and the large upper wing was supported by struts which also supported the propellers.

Power was supplied by three Maybach HS engines mounted inside the hull, transmitting power to the three propellers via clutches, gearboxes and shafts. The three propellers were mounted as pushers aft of the wing support structure at about mid-gap. Radiators for the internally mounted engines were mounted as a wide slab on the hull aft of the pilots cockpit.

The wing structure was formed by three built-up girder spars of triangular section with aluminium wing ribs spaced fairly wide apart; the wing fabric was sewn to special eyelets, which were attached to the framework at evenly spaced intervals. The lower wings were attached directly to the fuselage, touching the water when afloat, improving water-borne stability. The low aspect ratio upper wing was supported by a central frame work and N strut assemblies at 1/3rd span and 2/3rd span. Incidence of the upper wing was adjustable by altering the length of the forward N-strut tubes.

Flying controls were fairly conventional despite their size, with unbalanced ailerons on the upper wing and a large biplane elevator unit trailing a small tailplane and small rudders under the tailplane. To improve lateral control at low speeds, and improve spin resistance, the tip incidence was washed-out, ensuring that the inner wing sections stalled first.

The hull, constructed of steel bulkheads and stringers with Duralumin skinning on the sides and bottom, but fabric on parts of the upper decking, housed the crew in a cockpit near the nose, who were protected by a raised coaming. The engines and fuel lines were also housed inside the hull; they could be serviced in flight by a mechanic.

== Operational history ==
On 17 May 1916 the Rs.II left the hangar at Seemoos for initial taxiing trials with Schroter at the controls, with Graf Zeppelin, Dornier and other important people from the Zeppelin works observing from Zeppelin's motor boat Württemberg. Initial attempts at taking-off were unsuccessful, attributed to the very calm conditions not allowing the hull to un-stick, they also highlighted the unacceptable rudder power for manoeuvring on the water.

The first modification involved adding a third tall rudder between the original rudders. Flight tests resumed on 30 June 1916, take-off attempts were made with the wing incidence set at one, then two degrees and finally at three degrees which was successful at 07:30 hours. Two more flights were made that day and a further three flights proved the need for changes to the tail framework and tail surfaces; large diameter metal tubes replacing the upper booms and fixed fins fitted between the boom ends, as well as reducing the area of the central rudder and improving the planing surface shape.

Ready for continued flight tests on 17 July 1916, the RS.II still showed poor take-off characteristics and the aircraft was sluggish in roll. Rudder authority was also lacking as it was found impossible to maintain straight flight with the centre and starboard engines throttled back. During these tests the port transmission began to vibrate and eventually it failed, causing the port propeller to break. The aircraft dropped onto the water from about 10 m (33 ft), bounced into the air where the centre propeller transmission broke loose, damaging the tail boom as the aircraft settled with the tail boom in ruins.

=== Second version ===
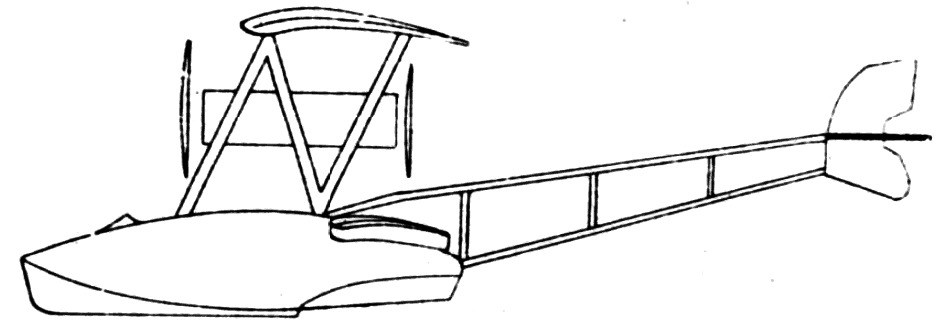
Zeppelin-Lindau Rs.IIa profile drawing from L'Aerophile, August, 1921

Rebuilding of the Rs.II was completed by 5 November 1916, with Schroter piloting the aircraft on its second flight the next day.

The much revised Rs.II had four more reliable Maybach Mb.IVa engines fitted in push pull nacelles mounted on struts above the hull at approx. mid gap. Initially the biplane tail cellule was retained with large fins and rudders attached to the tail boom side members; the tail unit was later made more conventional with a large tailplane and twin fins with rudders. Take-off performance was improved by moving the step further aft but the take-off run was still excessive. The upper wing was also lowered by shortening the centre section struts and moving the mounts for the side struts to halfway down the sides of the fuselage. Other changes included aerodynamic balance surfaces for the ailerons, lower wings with reduced chord and rounded tips.

Flight tests of the revised Rs.II were still dogged by engine problems with the engines either over-cooling when un-cowled, or overheating when fully cowled, not to mention spark plug and equipment failures exacerbated by a lack of spare parts. During May 1917, while practising landings, the Rs.II landed hard, breaking the central boom support. Unaware of the damage, the pilot attempted to take-off again, but the sagging tail forced the Rs.II back on to the water, where the tail broke off and sank to the bottom of Lake Constance.

By June 1917 the cumbersome tail unit had been replaced by a cleaner design with a single tailplane and finely formed fins and rudders mounted at the end of each boom. The new boom structure was much stronger and of simpler design. Evaluation by the SVK (Seeflugzeugs-Versuchs-Kommando - Seaplane Testing Command), was carried out from 23 to 26 June 1917 testing various engine off configurations and water-borne handling. Given a qualified clean bill of health, the Rs.II was prepared for a transit flight to Norderney on the North Sea coast to carry out seaworthiness trials.

Due to the recurring problems with the engines and the lack of clean high grade fuel, the Rs.II was required to carry out a practice delivery flight to ensure that the aircraft could reach its destination. During one of these practice flights, number 4 engine back-fired violently and number 1 engine's propeller disintegrated, showering the wings and hull with splinters. With two engines shut-down the pilot throttled back number 2 and 3 engines, gliding to a safe landing. The damage caused by the disintegrating propeller was deemed uneconomical to repair.

== Specifications (Dornier Rs.II first version) ==
Data from The German Giants

General characteristics

- Crew: 5
- Length: 23.88 m (78 ft 4 in)
- Wingspan: 33.2 m (108 ft 11 in)
- Height: 7.6 m (24 ft 11 in)
- Wing area: 257 m^{2} (2,770 sq ft)
- Aspect ratio: 5:1
- Empty weight: 6,475 kg (14,275 lb) (2nd version 7,278 kg - 16,045lb)
- Gross weight: 3,322 kg (7,323 lb) (2nd version9,158 kg - 20,190lb)
- Fuel capacity: 2000 litres (440 Imp. Gall.)
- Powerplant: 3 × Maybach HS (Mb.IV) 6-cyl water-cooled in-line piston engine, 179 kW (240 hp) each 1st version – Hull mounted
- Powerplant: 4 × Maybach Mb.IVa 6-cyl water-cooled in-line piston engine, 182.7 kW (245.0 hp) each 2nd version – Nacelle mounted

Performance

- Maximum speed: 105 km/h (65 mph, 57 kn) 2nd version (128 km/h – 79.5 mph)
- Rate of climb: 0.83333 m/s (164.041 ft/min)
- Wing loading: 33 kg/m^{2} (6.8 lb/sq ft) 2nd version

== See also ==
Related development

- Zeppelin-Lindau Rs.I
- Zeppelin-Lindau Rs.III

Aircraft of comparable role, configuration, and era

- AD Seaplane Type 1000
- Felixstowe F.2A

Related lists

- List of flying boats and floatplanes

== Bibliography ==
- Gray, Peter & Thetford, Owen (1987) [1970]. German Aircraft of the First World War (2nd ed.). London: Putnam. ISBN 0-85177-809-7.
- Haddow G.W., Grosz, P.M. The German Giants. Putnam, 3rd Ed., 1988 ISBN 0-85177-812-7
- Rimell, Ray (2009). Dornier Flying Boats. Windsock Datafile. Vol. 136. Berkhampstead, UK: Albatros Productions. ISBN 978-1-906798-03-1.
- Schmeelke, Michael (2020). Zeppelin-Lindau Aircraft of WWI: Claude Dornier's Metal Airplanes 1914–1919. Great War Aviation Centennial Series. Vol. 42. n.p.: Aeronaut Books. ISBN 978-1-935881-83-4.
