= V25 =

V25 may refer to:

- Fokker V.25, a Dutch experimental fighter aircraft
- NEC V25, a microcontroller
- V25-class torpedo boat, of the Imperial German Navy
  - SMS V25, the lead boat of the class
