= Zeppelin-Lindau Rs.III =

Flying boat

Rs III
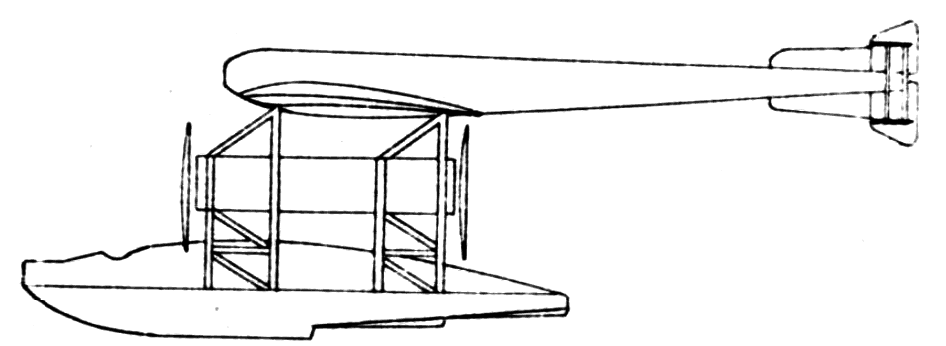

General information
- Type: Patrol flying boat
- National origin: Germany
- Manufacturer: Zeppelin-Lindau
- Designer: Claudius Dornier
- Primary user: Kaiserliche Marine
- Number built: 1

History
- First flight: 4 November 1917
- Developed from: Zeppelin-Lindau Rs.II
- Variant: Zeppelin-Lindau Rs.IV

The Zeppelin-Lindau Rs.III (known incorrectly postwar as the Dornier Rs.III) was a large four-engined monoplane flying boat designed by Claudius Dornier and built during 1917 on the German side of Lake Constance at the Zeppelin-Lindau works.

== Design and development ==
Although the Rs.III differed in appearance from its predecessors, it was the result of the experience gained from building and flying the Rs.I and Rs.II. The broad hull was retained as well as the push-pull tandem nacelles, but the open framework tail boom was replaced by a steel and Duralumin fuselage that sat on the centreline of the high mounted wing and the substantial tubular trusses supporting the wing were replaced by conventional wire bracing.

The short and broad hull accommodating the flight crew supported the engine nacelles and the wing centre section on a frame-work of struts, in similar fashion to the later version of the Rs.II. The high set fuselage had several tasks, providing gun positions for defence, ensuring that the tail unit was as high as possible to reduce damage from spray and to act as a king-post for the wings landing-wire bracing. Constructed of steel longerons riveted to Duralumin frames and covered with Duralumin sheet over the forward portion and fabric aft it supported the tail unit which consisted of a biplane tail cellule with elevators and a large central rudder, initially with a long central fin, but later with two smaller fixed fins in the tail cellule. At approximately the mid-wing chord position the fuselage had a cockpit with provision for two machine guns and also housed a sound-proof wireless cabin in the nose.

The hull was very similar to that of the Rs.II, being short and broad with a cockpit near the nose protected by a large coaming. Fuel for the engines was housed in a large fuel tank mounted in the hull, which also provided accommodation for the crew when not at their stations. The flight crew usually consisted of two pilots, a commander, and possibly a navigator, with gunners and mechanics to man the guns and engines as well as manually pump fuel up to each engine's gravity tanks.

== Operational history ==
As the Rs.III neared completion, the facilities at the Norderney Seaplane station on the North Sea coast were also completed. Delivery of the Rs.III was planned to follow the river Rhine after crossing the Black Forest, with a fighter escort between Rottweil and Duisburg due to the proximity of Allied forces, as well as a guide aircraft to prevent it inadvertently crossing the Dutch border.

Flight testing of the Rs.III carried on apace from November 1917, at the Lake Constance factory, with good results. Flying characteristics were generally good, the aircraft proving easy to fly, taxi on water, and capable of taking off in moderate seas. With only minor modifications, the Rs.III was ready for its delivery flight by the end of January 1918, but the route was covered with fog. The weather cleared by 19 February when the Rs.III set off on its 7-hour non-stop delivery flight to Norderney.

Operational testing at Norderney cleared the giant Rs.III for service with the Imperial German Navy on 13 June 1918 and it was turned over to the Seaplane Experimental Command (Seeflugzeug-Versuchs-Kommando) on 27 August 1918 for further Navy tests. After the Armistice the Rs.III was not destroyed immediately but continued flying with the German Navy Air Service on mine clearing duties until the Allied Control Commission finally ordered its scrapping in July 1921.

The Rs.III had proved easy to fly (but with some minor quirks), easy to manoeuvre on the water and durable, due to its metal construction.

== Specifications (Rs.III) ==
Data from The German Giants

General characteristics

- Crew: Six
- Length: 22.75 m (74 ft 8 in)
- Wingspan: 37 m (121 ft 5 in)
- Height: 8.20 m (26 ft 11 in)
- Wing area: 226 m^{2} (2,430 sq ft)
- Empty weight: 7,865 kg (17,339 lb)
- Gross weight: 10,670 kg (23,523 lb)
- Fuel capacity: 2,260 kg (4,982 lb) / 3,140 L (691 imp gal; 830 US gal)
- Powerplant: 4 × Maybach Mb.IVa. 6-cyl. water-cooled in-line piston engine, 183 kW (245 hp) each
- Propellers: 4-bladed fixed pitch wooden, 3 m (9 ft 10 in) diameter propeller centres 3.3 m (11 ft) apart

Performance

- Maximum speed: 135 km/h (84 mph, 73 kn)
- Endurance: 10 hours
- Time to altitude: 2,000 m (6,562 ft) in 35 mins

Armament

- Guns: Provision for one machine-gun in the nose and two machine-guns on top of the fuselage
