= LVG G.III =

G.III
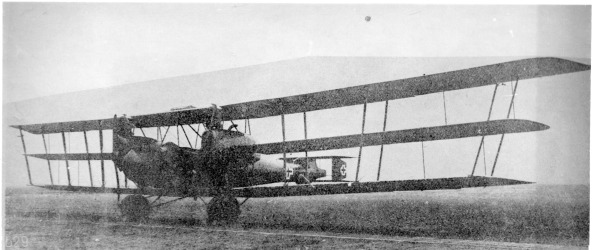

General information
- Type: Heavy bomber
- National origin: Germany
- Manufacturer: LVG (Luftverkehrsgesellschaft m.b.H.)
- Designer: Schütte-Lanz
- Number built: 1

History
- First flight: 1918

The LVG G.III was a large, twin engine triplane bomber built in Germany near the end of World War I. Only one was completed.

== Design and development ==
The LVG G.III is sometimes known as the Schütte-Lanz G.V or Schütte-Lanz Schül G.V as it was a Schütte-Lanz design but built by LVG. It was a triplane, the only one of its kind designated G or twin engined by the Idflieg. Only one example of this very large aircraft was built.

It was a three bay triplane, the bays separated by parallel pairs of interplane struts. The fabric covered wings were unswept and had constant chord and blunt tips. The spans decreased a little from top to bottom plane, so the outer interplane struts leaned outwards; there was little stagger. There were externally connected ailerons on each plane. The 183 kW (245 hp) Maybach Mb.IV six cylinder inline engines were mounted in the inner bay on the central plane, neatly and fully cowled.

The fuselage of the G.III was round in section and smoothly covered in plywood. There was an open gunner's position in the blunt extreme nose. It had a biplane tail, with the lower tailplane attached to the underside of the fuselage and the upper one raised a little above it. Twin fins and rudders were positioned between the two tailplanes, near to their tips. it had a wide track, conventional, fixed undercarriage with double mainwheels and a tailskid mounted below the fuselage on a small extension.

The G.III first appeared just before the war's end.

== Specifications ==
Data from Gray and Thetford p.486

General characteristics

- Length: 10.25 m (33 ft 8 in)
- Wingspan: 24.6 m (80 ft 9 in)
- Height: 3.9 m (12 ft 10 in)
- Wing area: 115 m^{2} (1,240 sq ft)
- Empty weight: 2,960 kg (6,526 lb)
- Gross weight: 4,100 kg (9,039 lb)
- Powerplant: 2 × Maybach Mb.IV 6 cylinder water cooled inline, 183 kW (245 hp) each
- Propellers: 2-bladed

Performance

- Maximum speed: 130 km/h (81 mph, 70 kn)
- Endurance: 5.5 hr
- Time to altitude: 20 min to 3,000 m (9,840 ft)

Armament

- Guns: Nose and dorsal Parabellum MG14 machine guns

== Bibliography ==
- Herris, Jack (2016). LVG Aircraft of WWI: Volume 3: C.VI–C.XI & Fighters: A Centennial Perspective on Great War Airplanes. Great War Aviation Centennial Series. Vol. 36. Charleston, South Carolina: Aeronaut Books. ISBN 978-1-935881-74-2.
