= Aviatik C.IX =

WWI German observation aircraft

C.IX
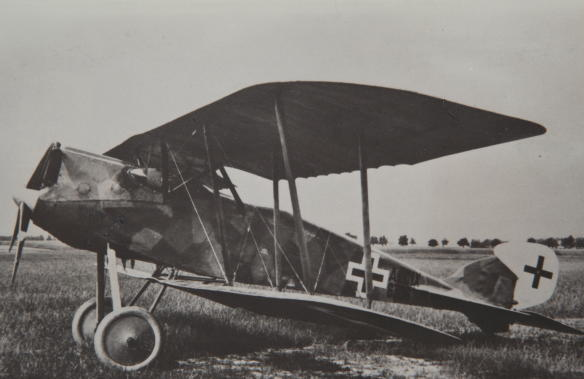
- Oblique view of the second C.IX prototype

General information
- Type: Reconnaissance aircraft
- Manufacturer: Aviatik
- Primary user: Luftstreitkräfte
- Number built: 3

History
- First flight: 1918

The Aviatik C.IX was a prototype two-seat observation aircraft built by Automobil und Aviatik AG for the Imperial German Army's (Deutsches Heer) Imperial German Air Service (Luftstreitkräfte) during the First World War. Three aircraft were built in 1918, but the C.IX was not placed into production.

== Design ==
The C.IX was a two-bay biplane design. The pilot's cockpit was placed underneath the trailing edge of the upper wing, with the observer's cockpit behind his. The wing had a large semi-circular cutout above the cockpit to improve the pilot's visibility above the aircraft. The prototypes differed slightly from each other to compare aileron and tail surface configurations. One aircraft only had ailerons on the upper wing while another had ailerons on both wings; those on the lower wing were actuated by a strut connecting the ailerons together. To reduced airflow interference, the gap between the wings was maximized by suspending the fuselage above the lower wing with several small struts. The C.IX was powered by a water-cooled 200-metric-horsepower (147 kW) Benz Bz.IV straight-six engine that drove a wooden, fixed-pitch, two-bladed propeller. The aircraft's armament consisted of a fixed, forward-firing 7.92-millimeter (0.312 in) LMG 08/15 Spandau machine gun and a 7.92-mm LMG 14 Parabellum machine gun on a flexible mount for the observer.

Three prototype aircraft were built with the second aircraft destroyed during static load testing in June 1918. It was not chosen for production.

== Specifications ==
Data from German Aircraft of the First World War

General characteristics

- Crew: 2
- Empty weight: 980 kg (2,161 lb)
- Gross weight: 1,340 kg (2,954 lb)
- Powerplant: 1 × Benz Bz.IV water-cooled straight-six engine, 150 kW (200 hp)
- Propellers: 2-bladed fixed-pitch

Performance

- Maximum speed: 160 km/h (99 mph, 86 kn)
- Service ceiling: 4,500 m (14,800 ft)

Armament

- Guns: 1 × fixed, forward-firing 7.92 mm (0.312 in) LMG 08/15 Spandau machine gun and a 7.92 mm Parabellum MG 14 machine gun on a flexible mount

== Bibliography ==
- Gray, Peter & Thetford, Owen (1987) [1970]. German Aircraft of the First World War (2nd ed.). Putnam. ISBN 0-85177-809-7.
- Herris, Jack (2023). Aviatik Aircraft of WWI: A Centennial Perspective on Great War Airplanes. Great War Aviation Centennial Series. Vol. 10 (2nd ed.). Aeronaut Books. ISBN 978-1-953201-59-1.
