= Siemens-Schuckert L.I =

L.I
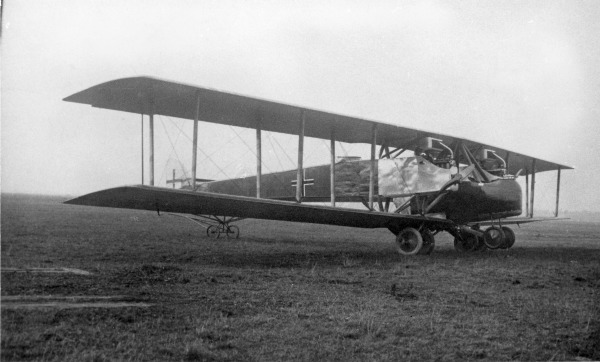

General information
- Type: Heavy bomber aircraft
- National origin: Germany
- Manufacturer: Siemens-Schuckert
- Number built: 3

History
- First flight: 1918

The Siemens-Schuckert L.I was a large, three-engined biplane bomber aircraft, built in Germany towards the end of World War I. It was a twin boom design, strongly influenced by the successful Caproni Ca.3. Three were built but not used operationally.

== Design and development ==
In 1918 Idflieg ordered a bomber which was to follow the layout of the three engine, twin boom Italian Caproni designs. It was originally called the G.III but was eventually moved into a new L category, intermediate between G and R, the only aircraft ever to be so classified.

The L.I was a large biplane with a wingspan of 32 m (105 ft). The wing was straight edged and of constant chord and divided into two outer bays on each side by three sets of parallel interplane struts and diagonal flying wires. Ailerons were fitted to both upper and lower planes, projecting behind the upper trailing edge and externally rod connected. On each side a square section tailboom or fuselage was joined to the wing structure between the innermost interplane struts and the central nacelle by more complicated bracing. A tractor 240 hp (179 kW) Maybach Mb.IV six cylinder water cooled inline engine was mounted in the nose of each boom and there was a gunner's position in the boom just aft of the wing trailing edge, equipped with a Parabellum MG14 7.92 mm (0.312 in) calibre machine gun.

The L.I was flown from a cockpit in the short central nacelle, which had a third Maybach engine in pusher configuration at the rear and another Parabellum equipped gunner's position in its nose. The fixed conventional undercarriage had pairs of mainwheels mounted under each outer engine and a tailskid on each boom. It also had a substantial nosewheel, mounted on the nacelle, to protect the L.I from damaging noseovers.

Three L.Is were built but the type was not used operationally.

== Specifications ==
Data from German Aircraft of the First World War.

General characteristics

- Crew: Four
- Length: 14.65 m (48 ft 1 in)
- Wingspan: 32 m (105 ft 0 in)
- Wing area: 169 m^{2} (1,820 sq ft)
- Empty weight: 4,400 kg (9,700 lb)
- Gross weight: 6,400 kg (14,110 lb)
- Powerplant: 3 × Maybach Mb.IV 6 cylinder water cooled inline, 180 kW (240 hp) each
- Propellers: 2-bladed . Two tractors, one pusher

Performance

- Maximum speed: 125 km/h (78 mph, 67 kn)
- Endurance: 5.5 hr

Armament

- Guns: 3 × Parabellum MG14 machine guns

== See also ==
- List of twin-boom aircraft
