= Rumpler C.IX =

German single-engine two-seat reconnaissance biplane

C.IX

General information
- Type: Reconnaissance aircraft
- Manufacturer: Rumpler Flugzeugwerke
- Designer: Dr. Edmund Rumpler
- Primary user: Luftstreitkräfte

History
- Introduction date: 1917
- First flight: 1917

The Rumpler C.IX was a German single-engine, two-seat reconnaissance biplane of World War I.

== Development ==
At the end of 1916, the Rumpler design bureau, led by Edmund Rumpler, conceived the two-seat reconnaissance 7C 1 alongside the single seat 7D 1 fighter (which became the Rumpler D.I) Rumpler's 7C 1 design was given the designation C.IX by the Idflieg. The Rumpler C.IX had single I-type interplane struts and a smooth oval multi-stringered fuselage.

The first C.IX began testing in the spring of 1917. As a result of flight tests, a constructive flaw in the vertical rudder was revealed. After completion, the second version of the aircraft was successfully tested and a contract was signed for the production of a small series of 20 aircraft (with numbers 1501/17 -1520/17).

== Operators ==
German Empire

- Luftstreitkrafte

== Specifications (C.IX) ==
Data from

General characteristics

- Crew: 2
- Length: 6.2 m (20 ft 4 in)
- Wingspan: 8.2 m (26 ft 11 in)
- Powerplant: 1 × Mercedes D.III 6-cylinder water-cooled in-line piston engine, 120 kW (160 hp)
- Propellers: 2-bladed fixed-pitch wooden propeller

Performance Armament

- Guns:

- 1 × fixed, forward-firing 7.92 mm (.312 in) LMG 08/15 with an interruptor gear
- 1 × 7.92 mm (.312 in) Parabellum MG14 machine gun on a ring mounting
