= Germania C.I =

WWI German reconnaissance biplane

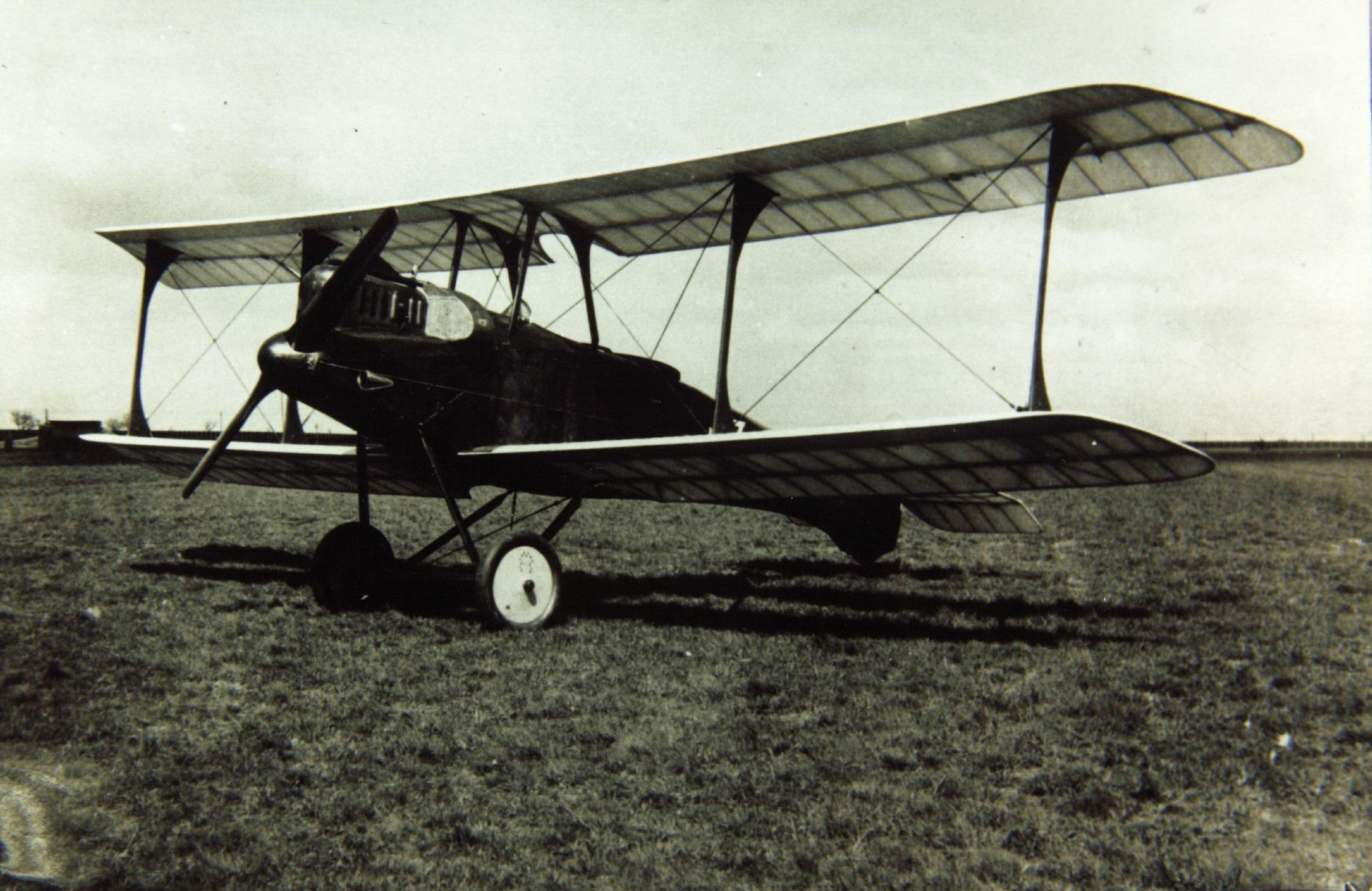

General information
- Type: Reconnaissance aircraft
- Manufacturer: Germania Flugzeugwerke
- Primary user: Luftstreitkräfte

History
- First flight: 1917

The Germania C.I was a two-seat general-purpose biplane built by Germania Flugzeugwerke during World War I.

== Design and development ==
Germania Flugzeugwerke built the C.I as a biplane of wooden construction with plywood and fabric construction. A forward firing Spandau machine gun and Parabellum machine gun were mounted in the aft cockpit.

A derivative of the C.I, the C.II, of which only a prototype was built, differed from the C.I in having staggered mainplanes and a reduced gap.

== Specifications ==
Data from

General characteristics

- Crew: 2
- Length: 8.10 m (26 ft 7 in)
- Wingspan: 12.40 m (40 ft 8 in)
- Height: 3.10 m (10 ft 2 in)
- Empty weight: 790 kg (1,742 lb)
- Gross weight: 1,210 kg (2,668 lb)
- Powerplant: 1 × Maybach Mb.IVa , 180 kW (240 hp)

Performance

- Maximum speed: 150 km/h (93 mph, 81 kn)
- Cruise speed: 125 km/h (78 mph, 67 kn)

Armament

- 1 × 7.92 mm (0.312 in) Parabellum MG14 machine gun in observer's cockpit
- 1 × forward firing fixed LMG 08/15 Spandau machine gun

== See also ==
Related development

- Albatros B.II
- Albatros C.III

Aircraft of comparable role, configuration, and era

- Royal Aircraft Factory B.E.2
- LVG C.II
- Rumpler C.I

Related lists

- List of military aircraft of Germany

== Bibliography ==
- Angelucci, Enzo. The Rand McNally Encyclopedia of Military Aircraft, 1914-1980. San Diego, California: The Military Press, 1983. ISBN 0-517-41021-4.
- Cowin, H.W. German and Austrian Aviation of World War I. Oxford, UK: Osprey Publishing Ltd, 2000. ISBN 1-84176-069-2.
- Gray, Peter and Owen Thetford. German aircraft of the First World War. London: Putnam, 1970, 2nd edition. ISBN 0-370-00103-6.
- van Wyngarden, G. Early German Aces of World War I. Oxford, UK: Osprey Publishing Ltd, 2006. ISBN 1-84176-997-5
