= Albatros C.IV =

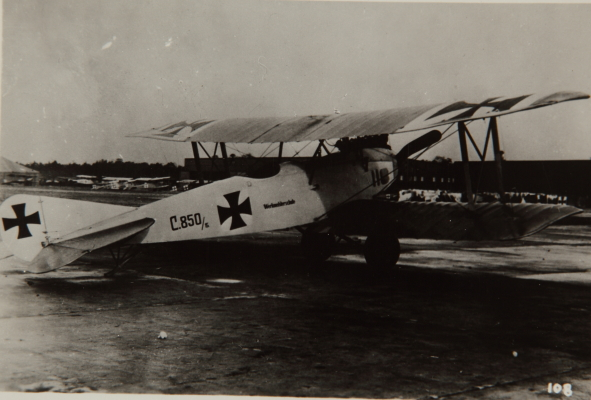
- Albatros C.IV

General information
- Type: Reconnaissance aircraft
- National origin: Germany
- Manufacturer: Albatros
- Status: Prototype only
- Number built: 1

History
- First flight: 1916
- Developed from: Albatros C.III

The Albatros C.IV, (Company post-war designation L.12). was a German military reconnaissance aircraft built in the autumn of 1915 by Albatros Flugzeugwerke. It was a single-engined biplane, and was based on the Albatros C.III, with which it shared many parts. It was eventually abandoned, in favour of the C.V.

== Design and development ==
The C.IV shared the same fuselage, landing gear, and tail section with the C.III, but Albatros changed the design of the wings and cockpit; the pilot was located in the rear cockpit. When it was tested in 1916, the expected results of the changes did not occur, and the project was abandoned in favour of a more promising prototype, which became the Albatros C.V.

The C.IV was armed with a forward-firing LMG 08/15 machine gun, and a rear-firing, Parabellum MG14 machine gun.

== Specifications ==
General characteristics

- Crew: 2
- Length: 8 m (26 ft 3 in)
- Wingspan: 12.4 m (40 ft 8 in)
- Height: 3.1 m (10 ft 2 in)
- Wing area: 41.2 m^{2} (443 sq ft)
- Empty weight: 798 kg (1,759 lb)
- Gross weight: 1,240 kg (2,734 lb)
- Powerplant: 1 × Mercedes D.III Inline piston engine, 118 kW (158 hp)160PS

Performance

- Maximum speed: 140 km/h (87 mph, 76 kn)
- Cruise speed: 125 km/h (78 mph, 67 kn)
- Endurance: 4h
- Service ceiling: 3,200 m (10,500 ft)

Armament

- Guns: 1×7.92mm LMG 08/15 and 1×7.92mm Parabellum MG14
- Bombs: 90kg
