= BFW N.I =

WWI German aircraft

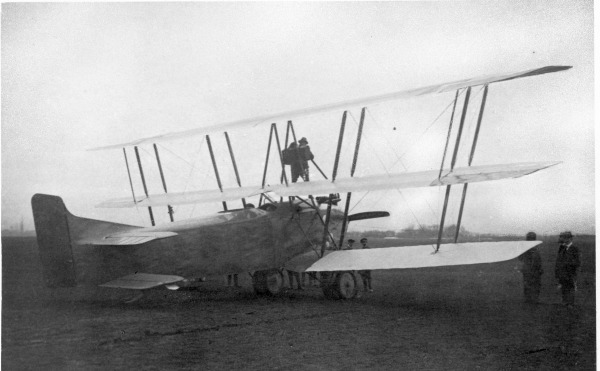
- BFW N.I in 1918

General information
- Type: Bomber aircraft
- National origin: Germany
- Manufacturer: Bayerische Flugzeugwerke (BFW)
- Number built: 1

History
- First flight: summer 1918

The BFW N.I was a prototype night bomber aircraft developed in Germany during the First World War.

== Development ==
In August 1917, Idflieg instructed BFW to develop a night bomber able to carry 500 kg of bombs. The resulting N.I was a two-seat triplane powered by one Mercedes D.IVa inline engine. The N.I first flew in the summer of 1918 but did not enter production.

== Specifications ==
Data from

General characteristics

- Length: 9.20 m (30 ft 2 in)
- Wingspan: 14.50 m (47 ft 7 in)
- Height: 4.70 m (15 ft 5 in)
- Empty weight: 1,500 kg (3,307 lb)
- Gross weight: 2,500 kg (5,512 lb)
- Powerplant: 1 × Mercedes D.IVa inline engine, 190 kW (260 hp)

Performance Armament

- 1 × fixed, forward-firing 7.9 mm (0.311 in) Parabellum MG14
- 744 kg (1,640 lb) of bombs

== Bibliography ==
- Herris, Jack (2012). Nachtflugzeug: German N-Types of WWI. Great War Aviation Centennial Series. Vol. 3. n. p.: Aeronaut Books. ISBN 978-1-935881-10-0.
