= Albatros G.III =

G.III
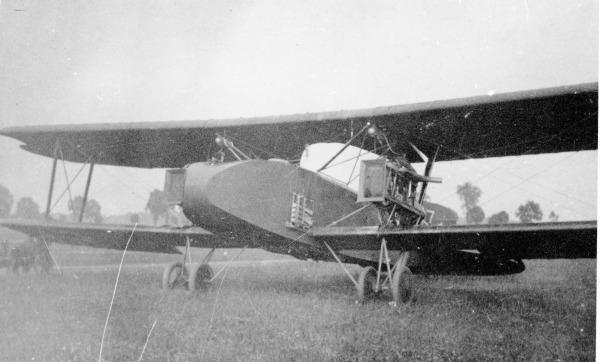

General information
- Type: Bomber
- Manufacturer: Albatros Flugzeugwerke
- Primary user: Germany

History
- Introduction date: 1917
- First flight: mid 1916

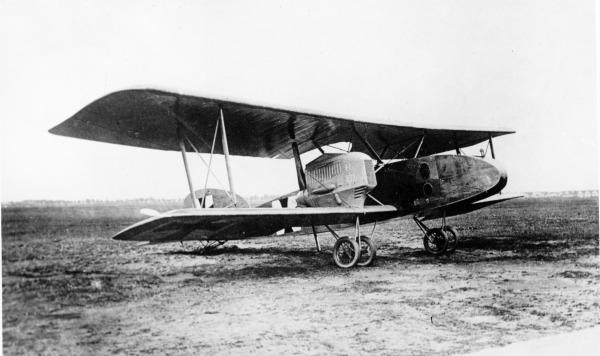
Albatros G.III

The Albatros G.III (company L.21), was a German bomber aircraft development of World War I. It was a large, single-bay biplane of unequal span and unstaggered wings. Power was provided by two Benz Bz.IVa pusher engines installed in nacelles carried between the wings. An unusual feature of the design was that the lower wing was provided with cutouts for the propellers, allowing the engine nacelles to be mounted further forward than would have been otherwise possible. Few were built, these seeing service mostly on the Macedonian Front in 1917.

== Operators ==
German Empire

- Luftstreitkräfte

== Specifications (G.III) ==
General characteristics

- Crew: three, pilot, observer, and engineer
- Length: 11.9 m (39 ft 0 in)
- Wingspan: 18.0 m (59 ft 0 in)
- Height: 4.2 m (13 ft 9 in)
- Wing area: 79.0 m^{2} (850 sq ft)
- Empty weight: 2,064 kg (4,550 lb)
- Gross weight: 3,150 kg (6,945 lb)
- Powerplant: 2 × Benz Bz.IVa , 164 kW (220 hp) each

Performance

- Maximum speed: 150 km/h (94 mph, 82 kn)
- Range: 600 km (370 mi, 320 nmi)
- Service ceiling: 5,000 m (16,400 ft)
- Rate of climb: 1.3 m/s (260 ft/min)

Armament

- 2 × 7.92 mm (.312 in) Parabellum MG14 machine guns
- 325 kg (720 lb) of bombs

== Bibliography ==
- Chant, Chris (2000). The World's Great Bombers: 1914 to the Present Day. Rochester: Grange Books.
- Herris, Jack (2017). Albatros Aircraft of WWI: A Centennial Perspective on Great War Airplanes: Volume 3: Bombers, Seaplanes, J-Types. Great War Aviation Centennial Series. Vol. 26. Charleston, South Carolina: Aeronaut Books. ISBN 978-1-935881-49-0.
- S, W (September–October 2009). "Rara Avis - The Albatros G.II/G.III". Windsock Worldwide. 25 (5). Albatros Productions: 12–14.
- Taylor, Michael J. H. (1989). Jane's Encyclopedia of Aviation. London: Studio Editions. p. 53.
