= Sablatnig C.III =

German WWI reconnaissance aircraft

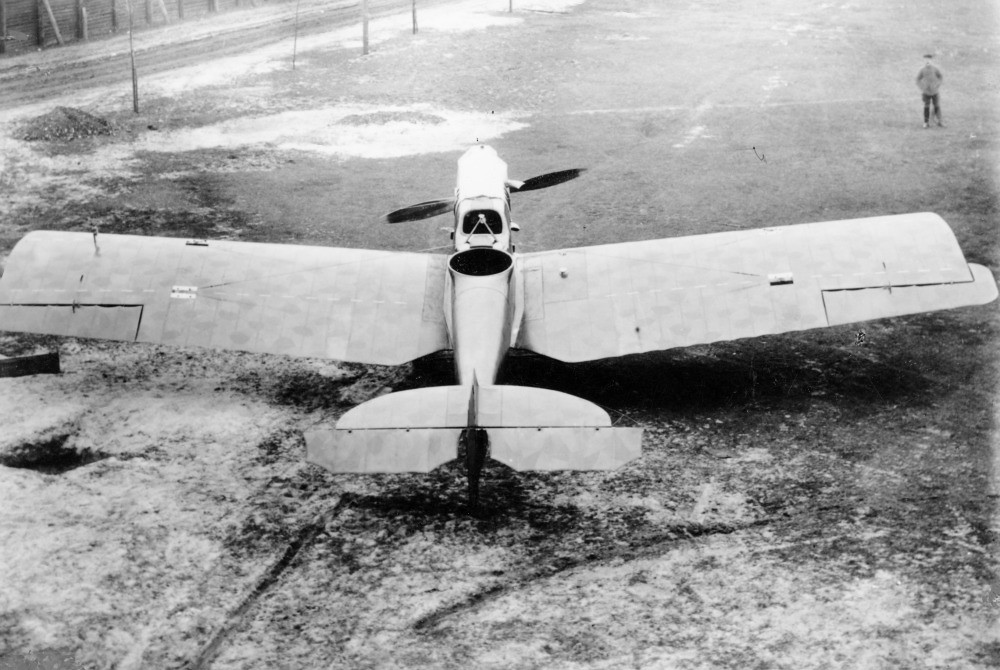
- Rear view of the C.III

General information
- Type: Reconnaissance two-seater
- National origin: Germany
- Manufacturer: Sablatnig
- Number built: 1

History
- First flight: 1918

The Sablatnig C.III was a monoplane C-type reconnaissance two-seater aircraft developed and built by Sablatnig in Berlin, Germany, in 1918.

== Design ==
The C.III monoplane was of wooden construction with a plywood-covered fuselage and fabric coverings. Like the Sablatnig C.II, the C.III used a Maybach Mb.IVa engine.

== Specifications ==
Data from

General characteristics

- Crew: Two
- Length: 7.89 m (25 ft 11 in)
- Wingspan: 13.6 m (44 ft 7 in)
- Empty weight: 1,026 kg (2,262 lb)
- Powerplant: 1 × Maybach Mb IVa six-cylinder inline piston engine, 191 kW (256 hp)
- Propellers: Two-bladed wooden, 3.15 m (10 ft 4 in) diameter

Performance

- Maximum speed: 170 km/h (110 mph, 92 kn)
- Service ceiling: 8,000 m (26,000 ft)

== Bibliography ==
- Herris, Jack (2012). Nachtflugzeug: German N-Types of WWI. Great War Aviation Centennial Series. Vol. 3. n. p.: Aeronaut Books. ISBN 978-1-935881-10-0.
