= OAW C.I =

General information
- Type: reconnaissance
- Manufacturer: Ostdeutsche Albatroswerke G.m.b.H (OAW)
- Primary user: Luftstreitkräfte
- Number built: 2

History
- First flight: 1915
- Developed into: OAW C.II

The OAW C.I was a German reconnaissance aircraft prototype of World War I.

== Design ==
The OAW C.I was built at the Albatros Schneidemühl factory, powered by a Benz Bz.III engine delivering 150 hp (110 kW). It had provisions for two crew, a pilot and an observer.

== Bibliography ==
- Herris, Jack (2016). Albatros Aircraft of WWI: Volume 1: Early Two-Seaters: A Centennial Perspective on Great War Airplanes. Great War Aviation Centennial Series. Vol. 24. n.p.: Aeronaut Books. ISBN 978-1-935881-47-6.
