= Aviatik C.VIII =

WWI German observation aircraft

C.VIII
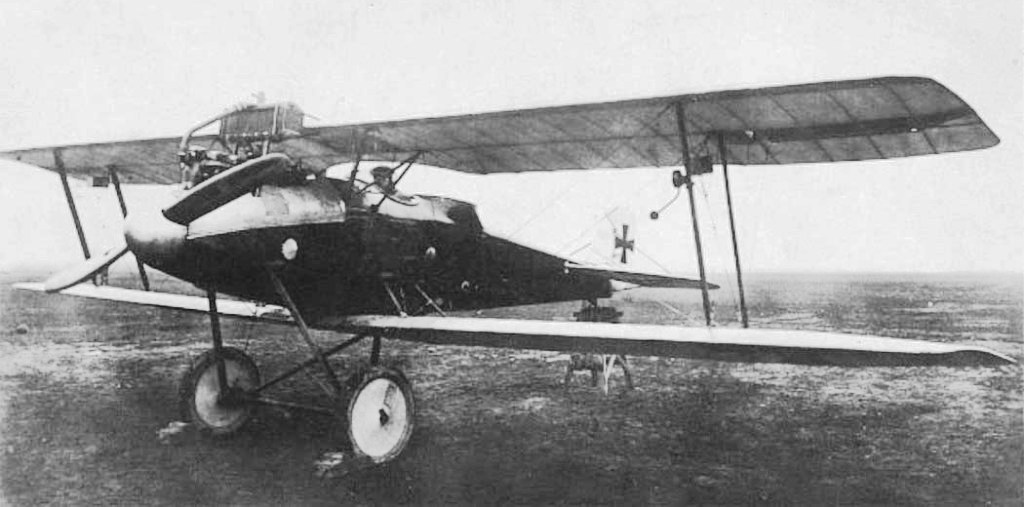
- An oblique view of the Aviatik C.VIII

General information
- Type: Reconnaissance aircraft
- Manufacturer: Aviatik
- Number built: 1

History
- First flight: 1917

The Aviatik C.VIII was a prototype German escort fighter aircraft built by Automobil und Aviatik AG for the Imperial German Army's (Deutsches Heer) Imperial German Air Service (Luftstreitkräfte) during the First World War. One aircraft was built in 1917, but no production order ensued.

== Development and design ==
Early in 1917, the Imperial German Air Service's Inspectorate of Flying Troops (Inspektion der Fliegertruppen developed a requirement for a new type of two-seat aircraft, smaller than the existing C-type aircraft. This type, known as CL-type (Light C type) aircraft, was used to equip Schutzstaffeln (Protection flights) to escort reconnaissance aircraft. Aviatik's contender was the C.VIII a small, two-seat, single-bay biplane. A single prototype was built in 1917.

The aircraft's fuselage was covered with plywood, except for the engine's metal cowling. The aircraft was powered by a water-cooled 160-metric-horsepower (118 kW) Mercedes D.III straight-six engine that drove a wooden, fixed-pitch, two-bladed propeller that was equipped with a spinner. The pilot's cockpit was positioned below the trailing edge of the upper wing and it had a large semi-circular cutout above the pilot to improve his visibility above the aircraft. Close behind it was the observer's cockpit. To minimize aerodynamic interference, the wings were widely spaced apart with the lower wing was attached to a keel below the fuselage and further strengthened with four struts. The C.VIII lacked the performance of its Hannover CL.II and Halberstadt CL.II rivals; no production order was placed.

== Specifications ==
Data from German Aircraft of the First World War, Aviatik Aircraft of WWI: A Centennial Perspective on Great War Airplane

General characteristics

- Crew: 2
- Powerplant: 1 × Mercedes D.III water-cooled straight-six engine, 120 kW (160 hp)
- Propellers: 2-bladed fixed-pitch

== Bibliography ==
- Gray, Peter & Thetford, Owen (1987) [1970]. German Aircraft of the First World War (2nd ed.). Putnam. ISBN 0-85177-809-7.
- Herris, Jack (2023). Aviatik Aircraft of WWI: A Centennial Perspective on Great War Airplanes. Great War Aviation Centennial Series. Vol. 10 (2nd ed.). Aeronaut Books. ISBN 978-1-953201-59-1.
