= AEG C.VII =

Reconnaissance biplane prototype model by AEG

C.VII
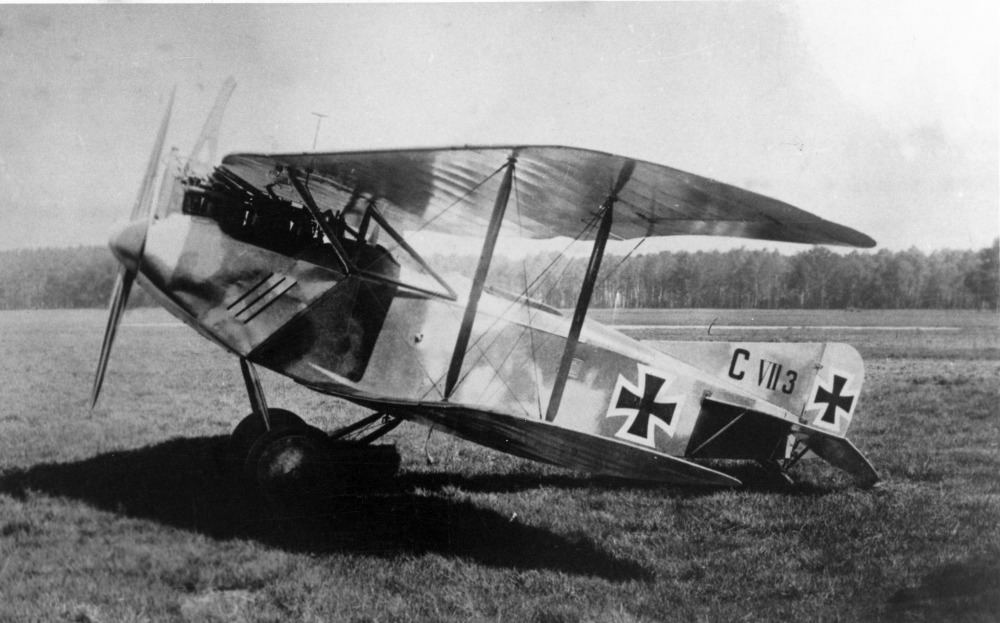
- The third prototype C.VII with the swept wing

General information
- Type: Reconnaissance aircraft
- National origin: German Empire
- Manufacturer: Allgemeine Elektricitäts-Gesellschaft
- Number built: 3

History
- First flight: December 1916
- Developed from: AEG C.IV

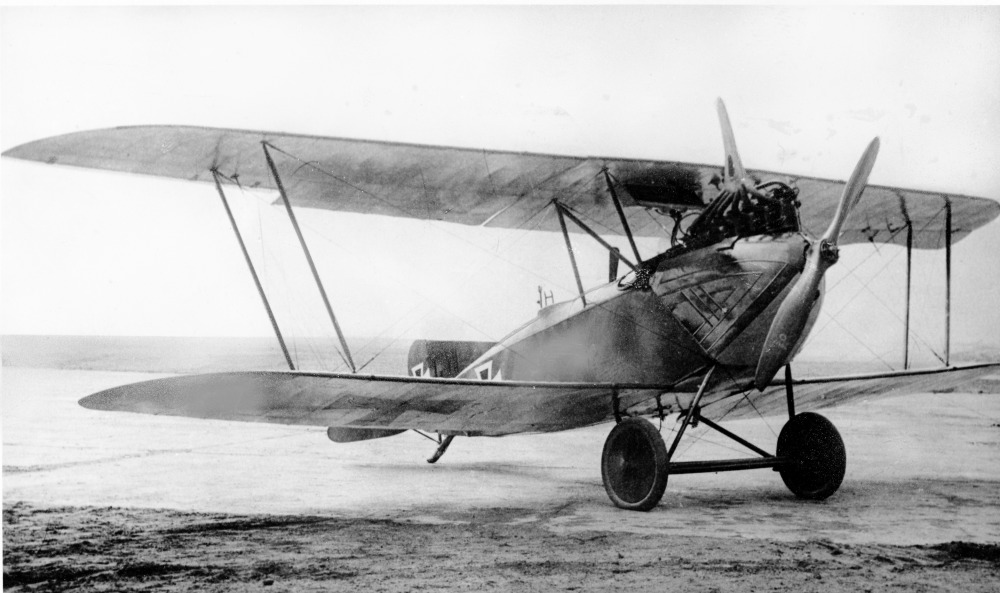
One of the first two prototype C.VIIs with the straight upper wing

The AEG C.VII was a prototype two-seat biplane reconnaissance aircraft built by the Allgemeine Elektricitäts-Gesellschaft (AEG) during the First World War for the Imperial German Army's (Deutsches Heer) Imperial German Air Service (Luftstreitkräfte). It was developed from the C.IV but did not enter production. The C.VII was tested with two different wing arrangements, one with straight wings and another with a swept upper wing.

== Development ==
The C.VII had been developed to the Inspectorate of Flying Troops (Inspektion der Fliegertruppen (Idflieg)'s requirement for a new type of two-seat aircraft, smaller than the existing C-type aircraft. These were to be used to equip protection flights (Schutzstaffeln) to escort reconnaissance aircraft. Three prototypes were ordered in October 1916 with the first aircraft completed in December. They were scaled down about 20 percent from the C.IV and the C.VII had single-bay wings. The two aircraft shared the same water-cooled 160-horsepower (120 kW) Mercedes D.III straight-six piston engine and the armament of one fixed, forward-firing machine gun and another on a flexible mount for the observer. The C.VII was about 20 kilometers per hour (12 mph) faster than the C.IV and had a better rate of climb. The first two prototypes had upper wings with straight leading edges, but the third had a swept wing that was intended to improve the gunner's visibility.

Fight testing was conducted in early 1917; Idflieg's report of 30 April damned the C.VII with faint praise, saying that its performance was acceptable, but was not as good as expected. It was judged suitable for service on the less demanding Eastern Front and inferior to the submissions by Hannoversche Waggonfabrik and Halberstädter Flugzeugwerke.

== Specifications (AEG C.VII) ==
Data from German Aircraft of the First World War; A.E.G. Aircraft of WWI: A Centennial Perspective on Great War Airplanes

General characteristics

- Crew: 2
- Length: 6.2 m (20 ft 4 in)
- Upper wingspan: 11.1 m (36 ft 5 in)
- Lower wingspan: 10.05 m (33 ft 0 in)
- Wing area: 26 m^{2} (280 sq ft)
- Empty weight: 758 kg (1,671 lb)
- Gross weight: 1,118 kg (2,465 lb)
- Powerplant: 1 × Mercedes D.III water-cooled straight-six piston engine, 120 kW (160 hp)
- Propellers: 2-bladed

Performance

- Maximum speed: 175 km/h (109 mph, 94 kn)
- Time to altitude: 4 minutes to 1,000 m (3,300 ft)

Armament

- Guns: * 1 × forward-firing 7.92 mm (.312 in) LMG 08/15 machine gun
- 1 × 7.92 mm (.312 in) Parabellum MG 14 machine gun in ring mount for observer

== See also ==
Related development

- AEG C.IV

Related lists

- List of military aircraft of Germany

== Bibliography ==
- Gray, Peter & Thetford, Owen (1987) [1970]. German Aircraft of the First World War (2nd ed.). London: Putnam. ISBN 0-85177-809-7.
- Herris, Jack (2015). A.E.G. Aircraft of WWI: A Centennial Perspective on Great War Airplanes. Great War Aviation Centennial Series. Vol. 16. n. p.: Aeronaut Books. ISBN 978-1-935881-28-5.
