= Sablatnig C.II =

WWI German reconnaissance aircraft

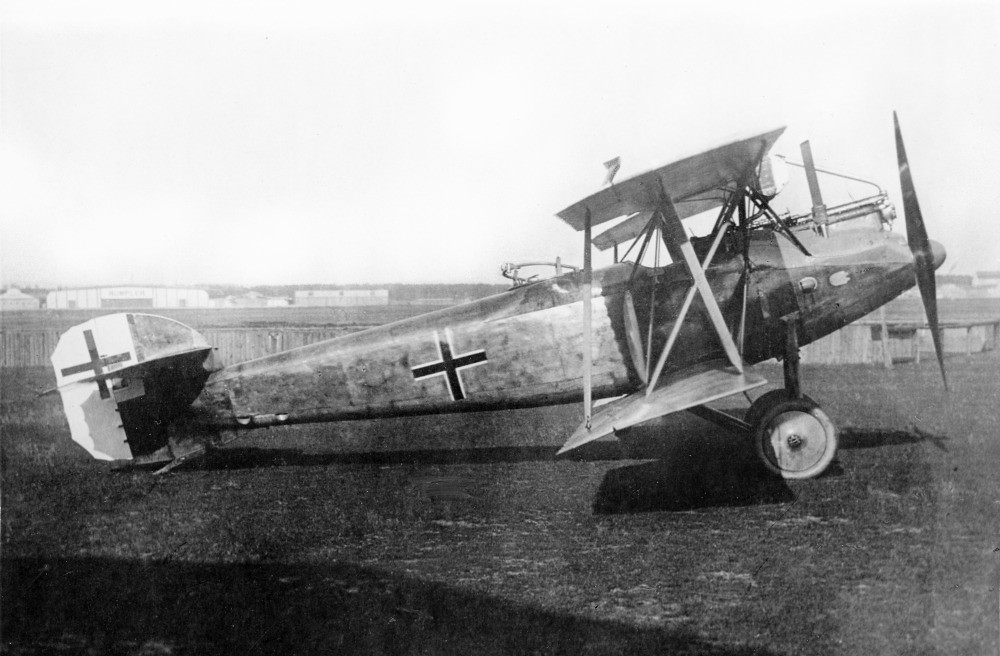

General information
- Type: Reconnaissance two-seater
- National origin: Germany
- Manufacturer: Sablatnig
- Number built: 3

History
- First flight: 1918

The Sablatnig C.II was a conventional C-type reconnaissance two-seater aircraft developed and built by Sablatnig in Berlin, Germany in 1918.

== Design ==
It was a two-bay biplane of conventional design, with staggered wings, two open cockpits in tandem, and fixed, tailskid undercarriage. The C.II was of wooden construction with a plywood covered fuselage and fabric coverings. Unlike the C.I, the C.II used a Maybach Mb.IV. Two additional prototypes were built with different strut arrangements and elevators.

== Specifications ==
Data from

General characteristics

- Length: 8.30 m (27 ft 2.75 in)
- Wingspan: 12.5 m (41 ft 0.25 in)
- Height: 3.20 m (10 ft 6 in)
- Empty weight: 1,068 kg (2,354 lb)
- Gross weight: 3,520 kg (7,760 lb)
- Powerplant: 1 × Maybach Mb.IV , 180 kW (240 hp)
- Propellers: 2-bladed

Performance

- Maximum speed: 150 km/h (93 mph, 81 kn)
- Range: 530 km (330 mi, 290 nmi)
- Service ceiling: 5,000 m (16,400 ft)
- Time to altitude: 4 min 30 secs to 1,000 m (3,300 ft)

Armament

- Guns: 1 x Parabellum machine-gun and 1 × Spandau machine-gun

== Bibliography ==
- Gray, Peter & Thetford, Owen (1987) [1970]. German Aircraft of the First World War (2nd ed.). London: Putnam. ISBN 0-85177-809-7.
