= Aviatik D.II =

D.II
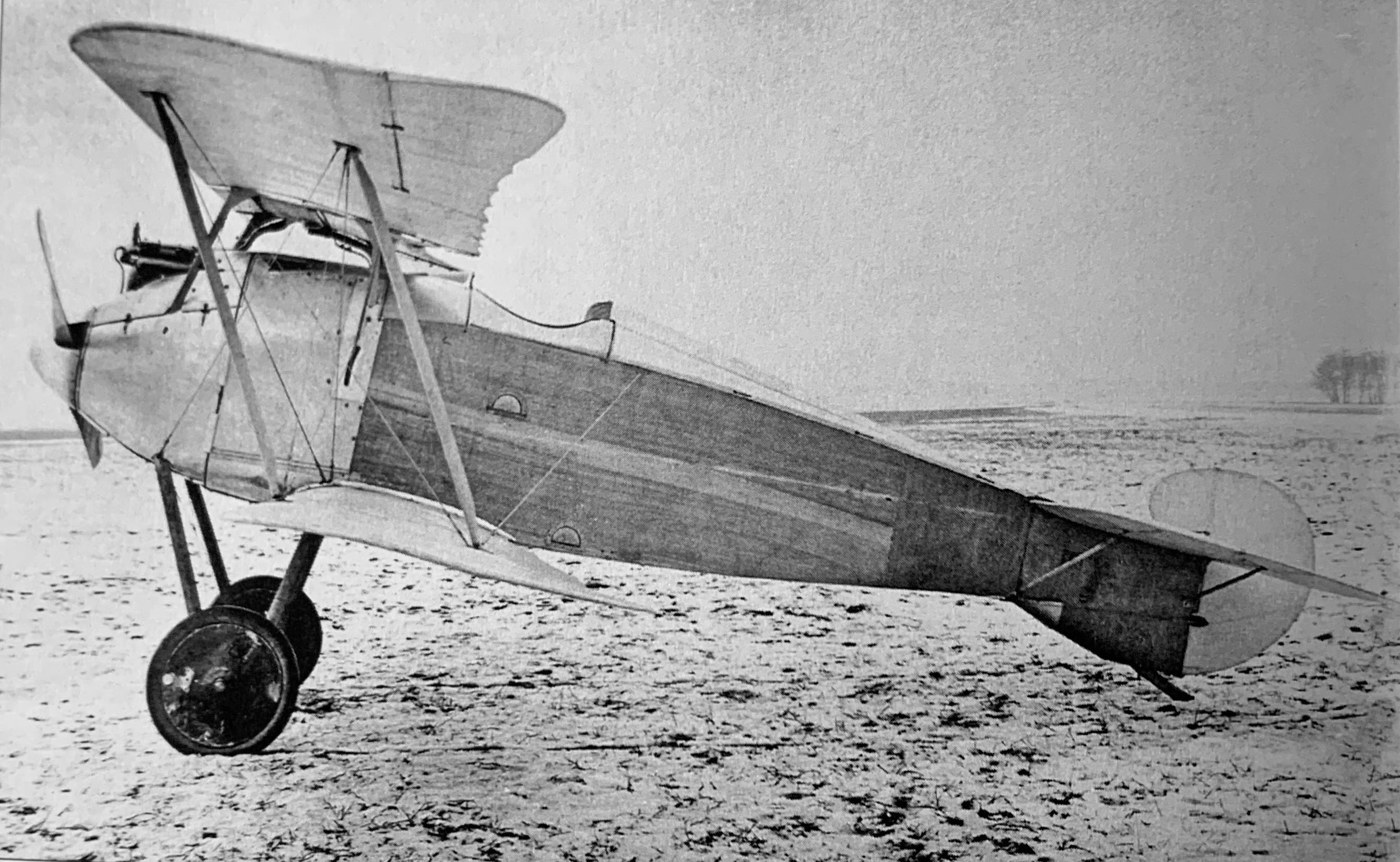
- Profile photograph of the Aviatik D.II with its original wings

General information
- Type: Fighter aircraft
- Manufacturer: Aviatik
- Number built: 1

History
- First flight: 1916

The Aviatik D.II was a prototype German single-seat biplane fighter aircraft built by Aviatik during World War I. Only a single aircraft was built, but no production order followed. It later had its conventional wings replaced by bird-shaped wings and has been referred to as the Geest Fighter in this guise. Further development was discontinued.

== Background and description ==
Aviatik had been building the Halberstadt D.II fighter under license as the Aviatik D.I, but decided to build a prototype of their own design in late 1916. The D.II was a single-bay, staggered-wing biplane with fabric-covered wooden wings and a single cockpit. The aircraft was powered by a single water-cooled, 160-horsepower (120 kW) Mercedes D.III six-cylinder inline engine using a two-bladed fixed-pitch propeller. The forward fuselage was built from steel tubes with a metal skin while the wooden rear fuselage was skinned with plywood. It was armed with a pair of fixed, synchronized 7.92 mm (0.312 in) LMG 08/15 machine guns in the forward fuselage. The prototype's performance was mediocre and it was not ordered into production.

=== Geest Fighter ===
Before the war's beginning in 1914, Dr. Waldemar Geest designed and built a series of six monoplanes using his Seagull (Möwe) gull wing design that was intended to compensate for forward or lateral gusts of wind "by a varying angle of incidence and dihedral throughout the wing planform". In 1917, the conventional wings that had been fitted to the Aviatik D.II were replaced by staggered wings designed by Geest with curved leading edges and raked ailerons on the upper wing. During testing, the single-bay aircraft had a maximum speed of 160 kilometres per hour (99 mph) and reached a height of 3,500 metres (11,500 ft) in 17.5 minutes, but further development was not continued.

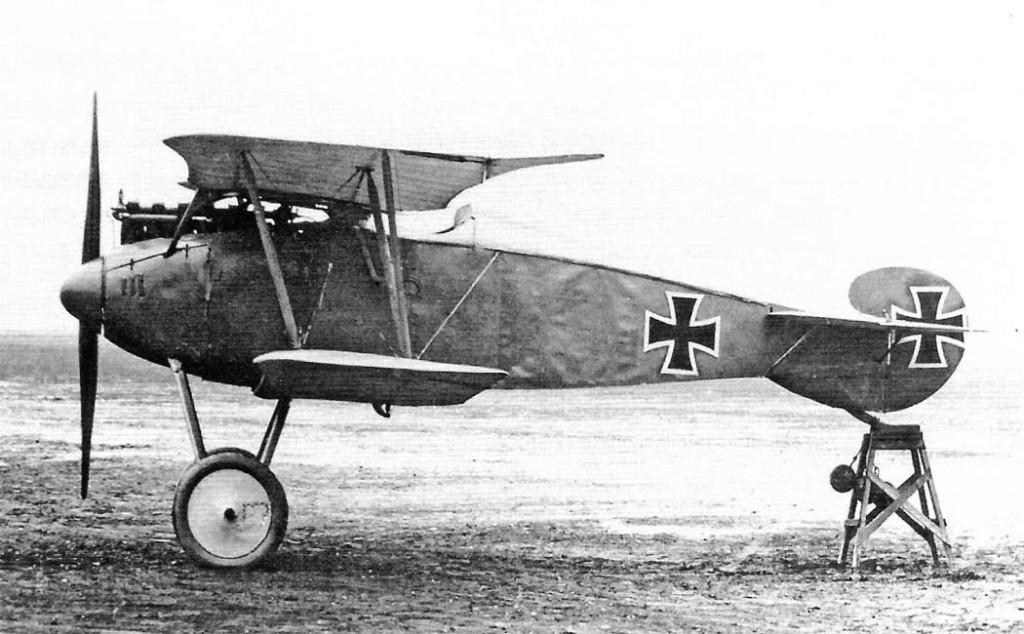
Profile photograph of the Aviatik D.II with the Geest wing

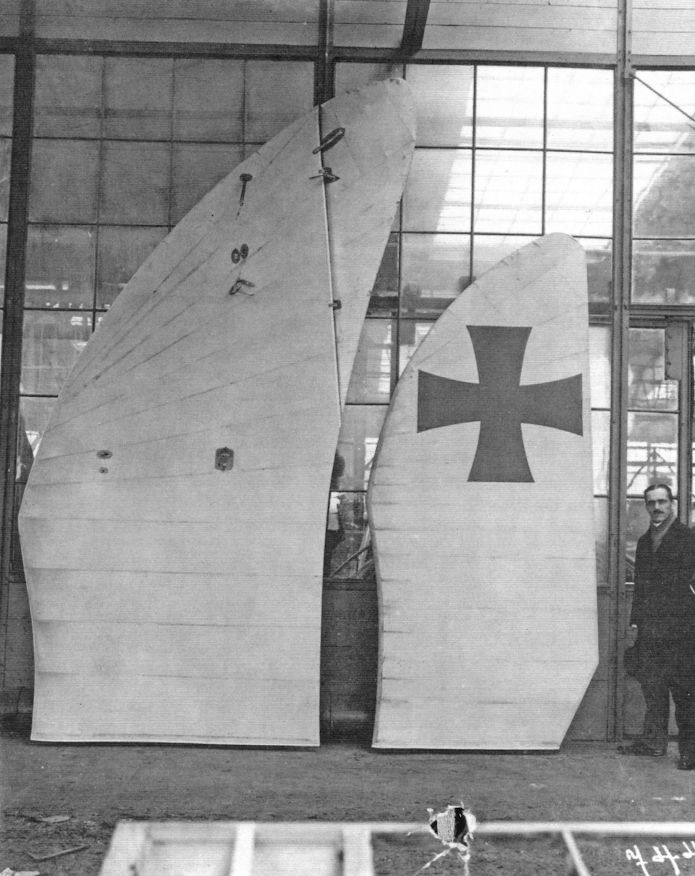
The upper Geest wing (left) and the lower (right)

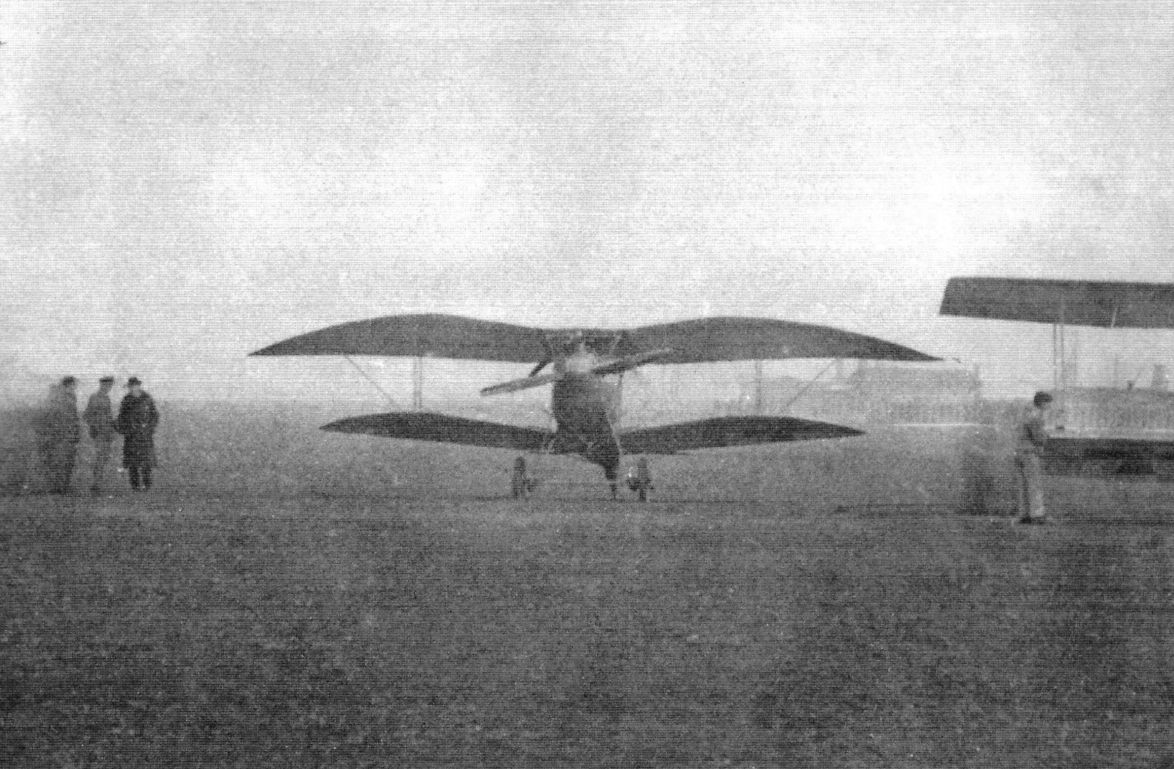
Frontal view of the Geest fighter

== Specifications ==
Data from Aviatik Aircraft of WWI: A Centennial Perspective on Great War Airplanes; The Complete Book of Fighters: An Illustrated Encyclopedia of Every Fighter Built and Flown

General characteristics

- Crew: 1
- Length: 6.82 m (22 ft 5 in)
- Wingspan: 8.84 m (29 ft 0 in)
- Height: 2.87 m (9 ft 5 in)
- Powerplant: 1 × Mercedes D.III 6-cylinder water-cooled in-line piston engine, 120 kW (160 hp)
- Propellers: 2-bladed fixed-pitch propeller

Performance

- Maximum speed: 150 km/h (93 mph, 81 kn)
- Time to altitude: 7.2 minutes to 1,000 m (3,300 ft)

Armament

- Guns: 2 × fixed, synchronized 7.92 mm (0.312 in) LMG 08/15 machine guns in the forward fuselage

== Bibliography ==
- Gray, Peter & Thetford, Owen (1987) [1970]. German Aircraft of the First World War (2nd ed.). London: Putnam. ISBN 0-85177-809-7.
- Green, William & Swanborough, Gordon (2001) [1994]. The Complete Book of Fighters: An Illustrated Encyclopedia of Every Fighter Built and Flown (Revised and Updated ed.). London: Salamander Books. ISBN 1-84065-269-1.
- Herris, Jack (2023). Aviatik Aircraft of WWI: A Centennial Perspective on Great War Airplanes. Great War Aviation Centennial Series. Vol. 10 (2nd ed.). n.p.: Aeronaut Books. ISBN 978-1-953201-59-1.
- Herris, Jack (2020). German Aircraft of Minor Manufacturers in WWI: A Centennial Perspective on Great War Airplanes. Gret War Aviation Centennial Series (49). Vol. 1: Alter to Korn. n.p.: Aeronaut Books. ISBN 978-1-935881-85-8.
