= AEG N.I =

German biplane night-bomber

N.I
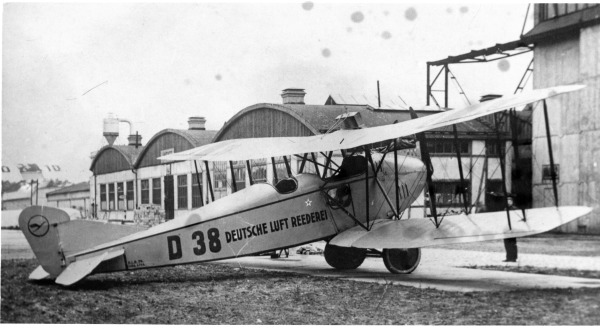
- AEG N.I airliner with Deutsche Luft Reederei

General information
- Type: Night bomber and airliner
- National origin: Germany
- Manufacturer: AEG (Allgemeine Elektricitäts-Gesellschaft)
- Primary user: Luftstreitkräfte (Imperial German Army Air Service)
- Number built: 37

History
- Introduction date: 1917
- First flight: September 1916
- Retired: 1918
- Developed from: AEG C.IV

The AEG N.I was a German biplane night-bomber which saw limited action during World War I. A total of 37 were built. Several were used postwar as airliners.

== Specifications ==
Data from German Aircraft of the First World War

General characteristics

- Length: 7.3 m (23 ft 11 in)
- Wingspan: 15.3 m (50 ft 2 in)
- Height: 3.3 m (10 ft 10 in)
- Empty weight: 880 kg (1,940 lb)
- Gross weight: 1,400 kg (3,086 lb)
- Powerplant: 1 × Benz engine, 110 kW (150 hp) or 150 kW (200 hp), civil

Performance

- Maximum speed: 143 km/h (89 mph, 77 kn)
- Endurance: 4 hours
- Service ceiling: 4,000 m (13,000 ft)

== Bibliography ==
- Herris, Jack (2012). Nachtflugzeug: German N-Types of WWI. Great War Aviation Centennial Series. Vol. 3. n. p.: Aeronaut Books. ISBN 978-1-935881-10-0.
- Gray, Peter; Thetford, Owen (1970). German Aircraft of the First World War (2nd ed.). New York: Doubleday.
