= Märkische D.I =

WWI German prototype fighter aircraft

D.I

General information
- Type: Fighter aircraft
- Manufacturer: Märkische Flugzeugwerke (MFW)
- Designer: Wilhelm Hillman
- Number built: 1

History
- First flight: 1918

The Märkische D.I was a prototype single-seat fighter biplane built in the last months of World War I.

== Development ==
The Märkische Flugzeugwerke was formed in 1916 to repair aircraft and train pilots. It also license-built other German aircraft prolificly during WWI. In 1918, Wilhelm Hillman joined the company from Schütte-Lanz to design a new single-seat fighter, the Märkische D.I. The first D.I prototype was built to participate in the First Fighter Competition at Adlershof, Germany, in May 1918, but was damaged in factory tests. The repaired first prototype, which had new wings and ailerons, was tested until September 1918.

== Specifications (D.I) ==
Data from The Complete book of fighters

General characteristics

- Crew: 1
- Length: 6.88 m (22 ft 7 in)
- Wingspan: 8.78 m (28 ft 10 in)
- Height: 2.8 m (9 ft 2 in)
- Gross weight: 912 kg (2,011 lb)
- Powerplant: 1 × Benz Bz.IIIb V-8 water-cooled piston engine, 145 kW (195 hp)
- Propellers: 2-bladed wooden fixed-pitch propeller

Performance

- Maximum speed: 215 km/h (134 mph, 116 kn)
- Cruise speed: 185 km/h (115 mph, 100 kn)
- Endurance: 2 hours 30 minutes

Armament

- Guns: 2 × fixed forward-firing synchronised 7.92 mm (0.312 in) LMG 08/15 machine gun
