= Hansa-Brandenburg W =

W, NW, and GNW
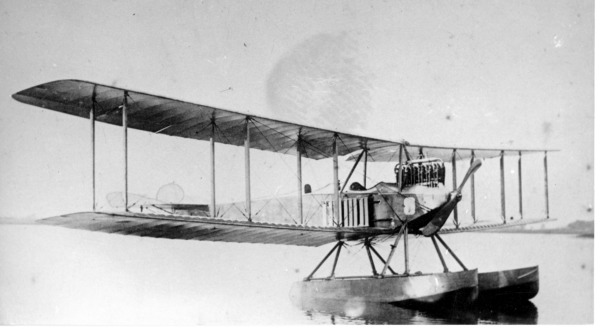

General information
- Type: Reconnaissance seaplane
- National origin: Germany
- Manufacturer: Hansa-Brandenburg
- Primary user: Imperial German Navy
- Number built: 77

History
- First flight: 1914

The Hansa-Brandenburg W was a reconnaissance floatplane produced in Germany in 1914 to equip the Imperial German Navy. Similar in general layout to the Hansa-Brandenburg B.I landplane, the W was a conventional three-bay biplane with unstaggered wings of equal span. The pilot and observer sat in tandem, open cockpits, and the undercarriage consisted of twin pontoons.

The NW and GNW of 1915 were a revised versions powered by a more powerful engine.

== Variants ==
- W - initial production version with Benz Bz.II engine (27 built)
- NW - revised version with Mercedes D.III engine
- GNW - revised version with Mercedes D.III engine

== Operators ==
Germany

- Kaiserliche Marine

Turkey

- Ottoman Air Force

== Specifications (NW) ==
General characteristics

- Crew: Two, pilot and observer
- Length: 9.40 m (30 ft 10 in)
- Wingspan: 16.50 m (54 ft 2 in)
- Gross weight: 1,650 kg (3,640 lb)
- Powerplant: 1 × Mercedes D.III , 120 kW (160 hp)

Performance

- Maximum speed: 90 km/h (56 mph, 49 kn)
- Range: 320 km (200 mi, 170 nmi)
