= OAW C.II =

WWI German reconnaissance aircraft

General information
- Type: Reconnaissance aircraft
- Manufacturer: Ostdeutsche Albatroswerke (OAW)
- Primary user: Luftstreitkräfte
- Number built: Few

History
- First flight: 1916
- Developed from: OAW C.I

The OAW C.II was a World War I-era German prototype reconnaissance aircraft. It was built by Ostdeutsche Albatroswerke (OAW), a subsidiary of Albatros Flugzeugwerke (Albatross Aircraft Company), for the Imperial German Army Air Service (Luftstreitkräfte). Although the exact number is unknown, only a few were built.

== Design ==
The OAW C.II was built at the Albatros Schneidemühl factory, as a derivative of the OAW C.I, with a Mercedes D.IV eight-cylinder in-line engine. It had provisions for two crew, a pilot and an observer.

== Bibliography ==
- Gray, Peter & Thetford, Owen (1987) [1970]. German Aircraft of the First World War (2nd ed.). London: Putnam. ISBN 0-85177-809-7.
- Herris, Jack (2016). Albatros Aircraft of WWI: Volume 1: Early Two-Seaters: A Centennial Perspective on Great War Airplanes. Great War Aviation Centennial Series. Vol. 24. n.p.: Aeronaut Books. ISBN 978-1-935881-47-6.
- Treadwell, Terry C. (2010). German and Austro-Hungarian Aircraft Manufacturers 1908–1918. Amberley. ISBN 978-1-44560-102-1.
