= Hansa-Brandenburg W.27 =

W.27 and W.32
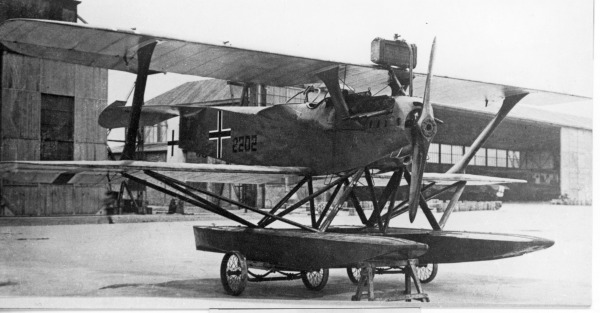
- Hansa-Brandenburg W.27

General information
- Type: Fighter floatplane
- National origin: Germany
- Manufacturer: Hansa-Brandenburg
- Number built: 3

History
- First flight: 1918
- Developed from: Hansa-Brandenburg W.12

The Hansa-Brandenburg W.27 and W.32 were prototype fighter floatplanes designed by the Hansa-Brandenburg Aircraft Company (Hansa Brandenburgische Flugzeugwerke) for the Imperial German Navy's (Kaiserliche Marine) Naval Air Service (Marine-Fliegerabteilung) during World War I. They were developed from and were intended replacements for the W.12 then in service. They differed from each other principally in the choice of powerplant, the W.27 with a Benz Bz.IIIb and the W.32 with the same Mercedes D.III that the W.12 used. Neither aircraft was chosen for production.

== Design and development ==
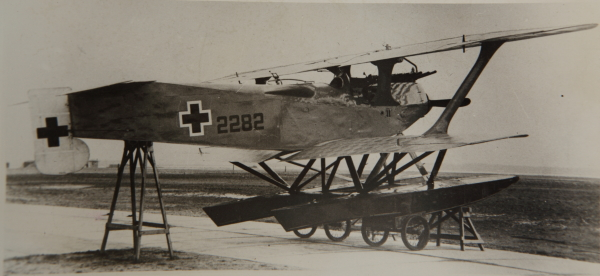
Hansa-Brandenburg W.32

Like the W.12, the W.27 was single-bay biplanes of largely conventional configuration, unusual only in having no dorsal vertical stabilizer, with an all-moving rudder that projected below the fuselage and forward of the rudder post. It differed from the earlier design in having a shorter fuselage, more severely staggered wings, and I-struts for both the interplane and cabane bracing, where the W.12 had used more conventional pairs of struts. The W.27 was powered by a water-cooled 195-metric-horsepower (143 kW) Benz Bz.IIIb V-eight engine that drove a two-bladed propeller. The radiator was mounted above the upper wing in a fully-upright position, unlike the slanted angle of the W.12. The armament was intended to consist of two fixed, forward-firing 7.92-millimeter (0.312 in) LMG 08/15 machine guns and a 7.92 mm Parabellum MG14 machine gun on a flexible mount for the observer.

Three W.27s were ordered in December 1917 and the first prototype was delivered in May 1918 with the other two following in June. One of the aircraft used a geared Benz B.IIIbm. The performance of the W.27 was not improved enough over the W.12 and it was not selected for production, possibly due to its troublesome engine; the three prototypes were used for training.

The W.32 was derived from the W.27, and differed primarily in that it used the water-cooled 160-metric-horsepower (118 kW) Mercedes D.III straight-six engine, probably as an effort by Brandenburg-Hansa to salvage its work on the earlier aircraft. Other changes included a radiator that protruded from the leading edge of the upper wing and a spinner on the propeller. Five aircraft were ordered in February 1918, although two of them were cancelled on 22 April. The others were delivered to the naval base at Kiel-Holtenau later that year.

== Variants ==
W.27
Powered by a Benz Bz.IIIb
W.32
Powered by a Mercedes D.III

== Specifications (W.27) ==
Data from Hansa-Brandenburg Aircraft of WWI: Volume 2: Biplane Seaplanes: A Centennial Perspective on Great War Airplanes; Complete Book of Fighters

General characteristics

- Crew: 2
- Length: 8.32 m (27 ft 4 in)
- Upper wingspan: 11.2 m (36 ft 9 in)
- Lower wingspan: 10.5 m (34 ft 5 in)
- Height: 3.057 m (10 ft 0 in)
- Wing area: 36.6 m^{2} (394 sq ft)
- Empty weight: 1,109 kg (2,445 lb)
- Gross weight: 1,619 kg (3,569 lb)
- Powerplant: 1 × Benz Bz.IIIb water-cooled V-eight piston engine, 145 kW (195 hp)
- Propellers: 2-bladed fixed-pitch

Armament

- 2 × fixed, forward-firing 7.92 mm (0.312 in) LMG 08/15 machine guns
- 1 × 7.92 mm Parabellum MG14 machine gun on a flexible mount for the observer
