= NFW E.II =

WWI German fighter aircraft

General information
- Type: Fighter
- Manufacturer: National Flugzeug-Werk GmbH Johannisthal (NFW)
- Number built: 1

History
- First flight: 1917

The NFW E.II was a fighter aircraft built in Germany during World War I.

== Design ==
The E.II was an all-wood single seat monoplane powered by a Mercedes D.IIIa engine. One prototype was built and flown in 1917, but the type did not enter production.

== Specifications (E.II) ==
Data from , German Aircraft of the First World War

General characteristics

- Crew: 1
- Length: 7.8 m (25 ft 7 in)
- Wingspan: 12 m (39 ft 4 in)
- Wing area: 17 m^{2} (180 sq ft)
- Empty weight: 558 kg (1,230 lb)
- Gross weight: 768 kg (1,693 lb)
- Powerplant: 1 × Mercedes D.IIIa 6-cylinder water-cooled in-line piston engine, 120 kW (160 hp)

Performance

- Maximum speed: 186 km/h (116 mph, 100 kn)
- Cruise speed: 148 km/h (92 mph, 80 kn)
- Time to altitude: 2,900 m (9,500 ft) in 6 minutes 18 seconds

Armament

- Guns: 1-2 × machine guns

== See also ==
Related lists

- List of military aircraft of Germany
