= Fokker V.17 =

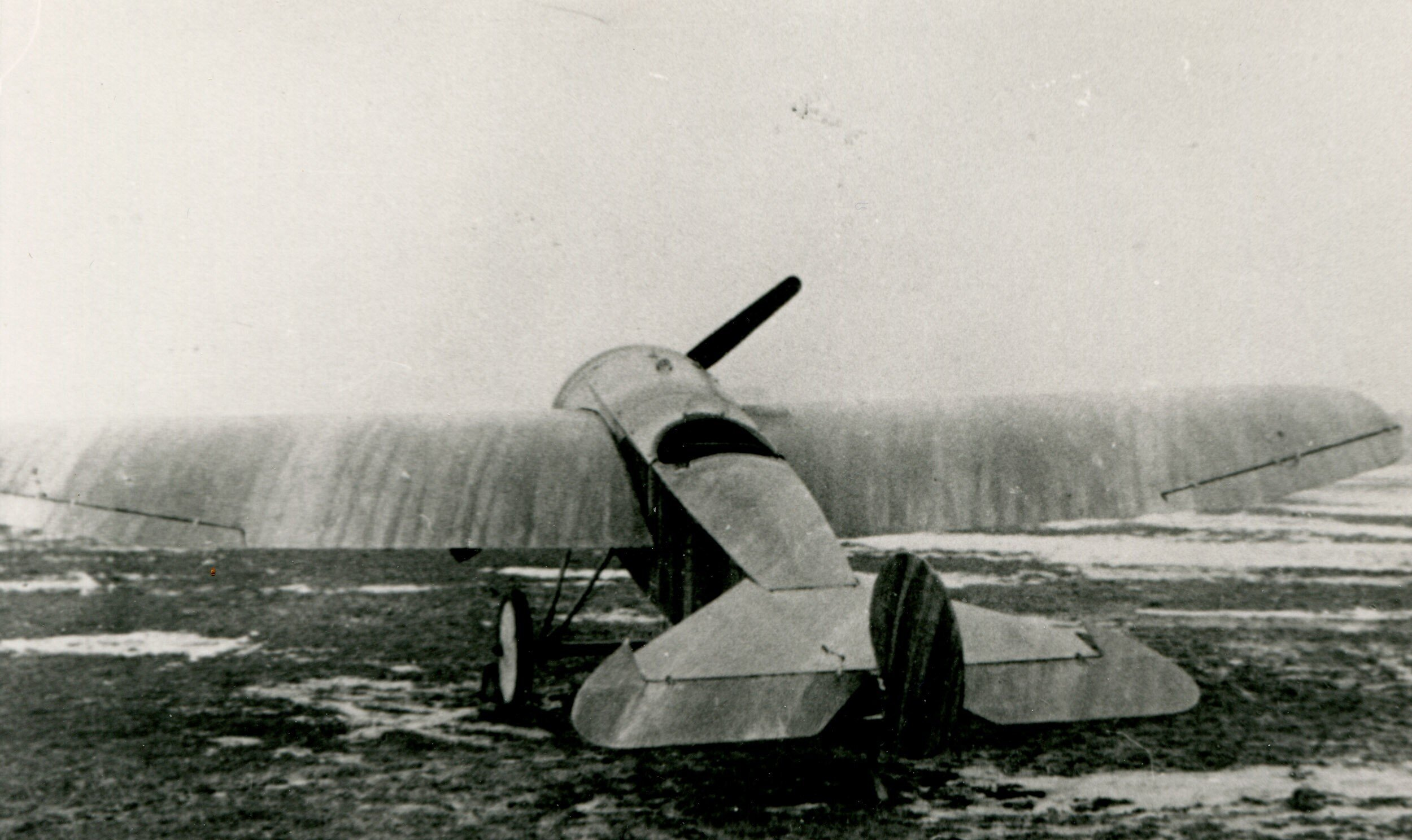
Fokker V.17

The Fokker V.17 and its derivatives were a series of experimental monoplane Fighter aircraft produced by the Dutch aircraft company Fokker in the 1910s.

V.17, was a shoulder cantilever-winged monoplane with plywood covering. 82 kW (110 hp) Oberursel engine.

V.20, was a cantilever mid-winged fighter with plywood covering and was powered by a 119 kW (160 hp) Mercedes D IIIa engine. It was similar to the V.17.

V.21 was much like the V.20 except the wings were tapered.

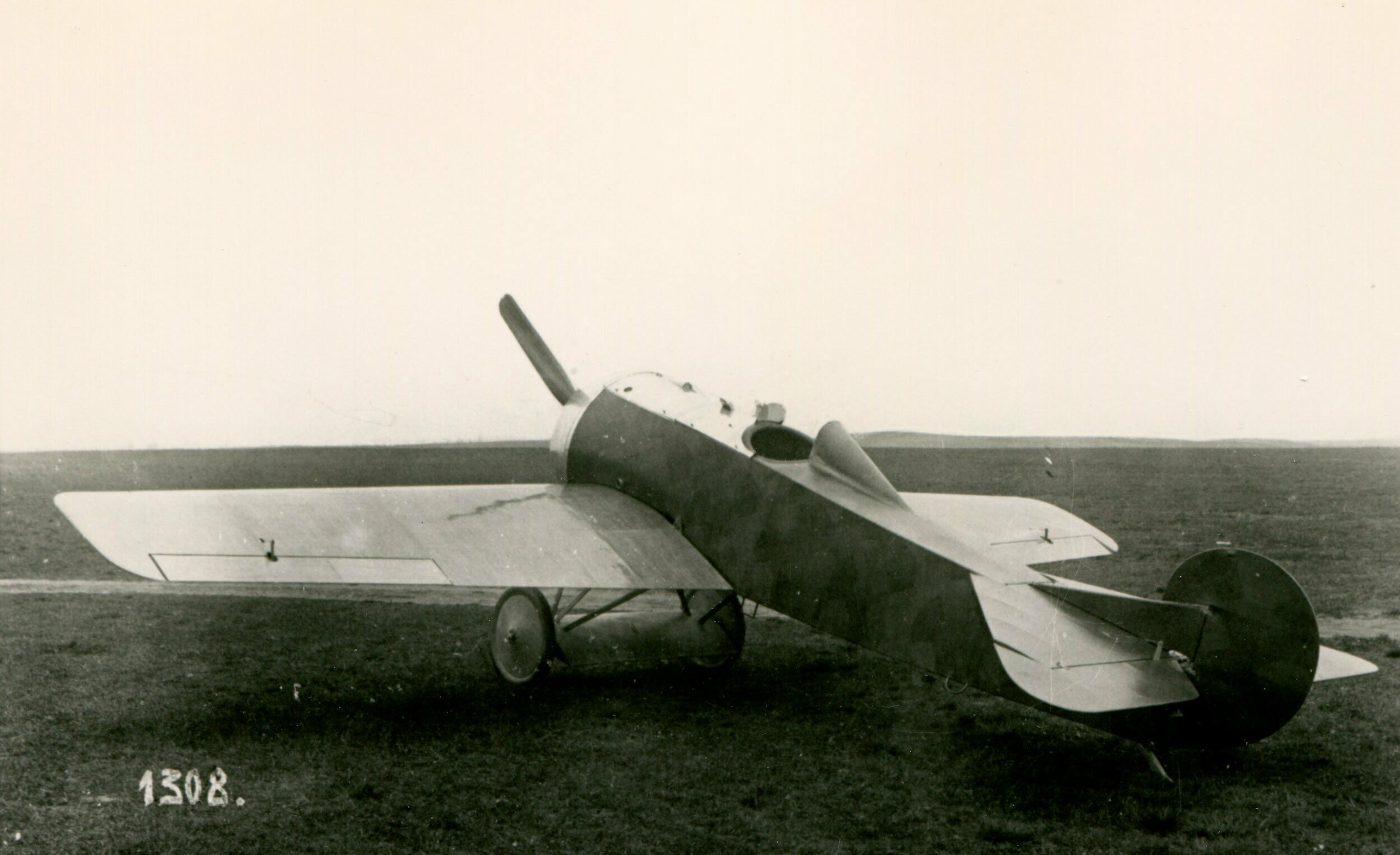
Fokker V.25

V.23 was related to the V.20 and V.21. It was evaluated by the German Army and rejected due to poor forward visibility (presumably on landing). The V.23 was powered by a 119 kW (160 hp) Mercedes III engine, was 5.8 m (19 ft) long, had a wingspan of 8.73 m (28.64 ft), a height of 2.65 m (8.69 ft). The wing area was 11.12 m² (119.69 ft²), the empty weight was 673 kg (1,484 lb), maximum weight 853 kg (1,881 lb). The maximum speed of the V.23 was 200 km/h (124 mph). Armament was two 7.92 mm (.312 in) machine guns.

V.25 was plywood-covered, with a low cantilever wing. It powered by an Oberursel Ur. II of 82 kW (110 hp). The aircraft was underpowered. V.25 was 5.93 m (18.46 ft) long, had a wing span of 8.73 m (28.64 ft) and was 2.63 m (8.63 ft) high. Its wing area was 11.12 m² (119.69 ft²), empty weight was 383 kg (844 lb), and had a maximum weight of 584 kg (1,287 lb).

== Bibliography ==
- Herris, Jack & Leckscheid, Jörn (2023). Fokker Aircraft of WWI: Volume 5: 1918 Designs, Part 1 - Prototypes & D.VI: A Centennial Perspective on Great War Airplanes. Great War Aviation Centennial Series. Vol. 55A. n.p.: Aeronaut Books. ISBN 978-1-953201-09-6.
