= Zeppelin-Lindau Rs.I =

German flying boat

Rs.I
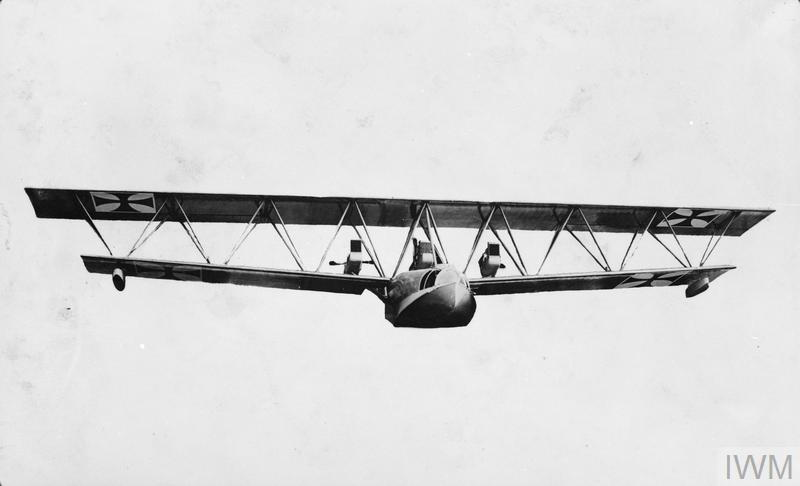
- A front view of the flying boat

General information
- Type: Patrol flying boat
- National origin: Germany
- Manufacturer: Zeppelin-Lindau
- Designer: Claudius Dornier
- Number built: 1

The Zeppelin-Lindau Rs.I (also known as the Dornier Rs.I) was a large three-engined biplane flying boat designed by Claudius Dornier and built during 1914–15 on the German side of Lake Constance. It was destroyed in a storm.

== Design and development ==
Claudius Dornier gained the attention of Count Ferdinand von Zeppelin while working on a proposed trans-atlantic airship during 1913. Later he appointed him as chief designer of the Zeppelin-Werke at Lindau, responsible for building large patrol flying boats. Dornier's first design to be built was the Rs.I. This was a large aircraft (Riesenflugzeug in the German classification) constructed largely of high-strength steel for highly stressed parts, and Duralumin (aluminium alloy) for low stress parts. The wings were on top of the hull and were braced with four sets per side of Warren strut style interplane structures comprising 'V' struts, which obviated the need for drag inducing wire bracing. The wing structure was formed with built-up steel spars, four in the top wing and three in the lower wing, and duralumin ribs riveted to the spars and braced internally. The fuselage was also made up from formed steel members built up into a framework which was then covered with fabric or dural sheeting. The powerplant arrangements were unorthodox, with the two outboard engines housed inside the fuselage, each driving a pusher propeller via shafts and bevel gearboxes, and a central pusher engine in a nacelle between the wings.

== History ==
The Rs.I was completed by October 1915 and rolled out at Seemos for trials. On 23 October, during a taxi test, the port propeller and/or gearbox parted company with the aircraft, causing damage to the gearbox mountings and the upper wing. The opportunity was taken to move the outboard engines into nacelles identical to that of centre engine, and mount them between the wings on an independent structure with catwalks to enable engineers to attend to engines in flight. This gave much better clearance from spray for the propellers, which was probably the cause of the port gearbox/propeller failure. Taxiing trials recommenced, but with little success. On 21 December 1915 a Foehn wind blew up during trials. Unable to beach the giant flying boat, attempts were made to ride out the storm on the lake, but the moorings gave and the Rs.I was dashed to pieces on the lakeside rocks.

The RsI is noteworthy for the construction materials used as well as its size; it was the largest aeroplane in the world at the time of its launch.

== Specifications (Zeppelin-Lindau Rs.I) ==
Data from The German Giants

General characteristics

- Crew: at least 7
- Length: 29 m (95 ft 2 in)
- Wingspan: 43.5 m (142 ft 9 in)
- Height: 7.2 m (23 ft 7 in)
- Wing area: 328.8 m^{2} (3,539 sq ft)
- Empty weight: 7,500 kg (16,535 lb)
- Gross weight: 4,763 kg (10,500 lb)
- Powerplant: 3 × Maybach HS (Mb.IV) , 179 kW (240 hp) each

== See also ==
Aircraft of comparable role, configuration, and era

- AD Seaplane Type 1000
- Felixstowe F.2A

Related lists

- List of flying boats and floatplanes

== Bibliography ==
- Gray, Peter & Thetford, Owen (1987) [1970]. German Aircraft of the First World War (2nd ed.). London: Putnam. ISBN 0-85177-809-7.
- Haddow G.W., Grosz, P.M. The German Giants. Putnam, 3rd Ed., 1988 ISBN 0-85177-812-7
- Rimell, Ray (2009). Dornier Flying Boats. Windsock Datafile. Vol. 136. Berkhampstead, UK: Albatros Productions. ISBN 978-1-906798-03-1.
- Schmeelke, Michael (2020). Zeppelin-Lindau Aircraft of WWI: Claude Dornier's Metal Airplanes 1914–1919. Great War Aviation Centennial Series. Vol. 42. n.p.: Aeronaut Books. ISBN 978-1-935881-83-4.
