= Maybach Mb.IV =

Mb.IV
- Maybach HS Lu on display at the Polish Aviation Museum
- Type: water-cooled straight-six piston engine
- National origin: Germany
- Manufacturer: Maybach

The Maybach Mb.IV, originally designated Maybach HS, (only related to the Mb IVa by layout and size), was a straight-six piston engine of 200–240 hp (150–180 kW) output, originally developed for use in airships. It was also used for large aircraft such as the Zeppelin-Lindau Rs.I seaplane.

Variants of the original HS engine included the Maybach HS D, Maybach HS K and Maybach HS Lu. The latter engine was used in the Zeppelin-type and Schütte-Lanz Type E airships.

== Variants ==
Maybach HS
Company designation
Maybach HS D
A variant of the HS
Maybach HS K
Another variant of the HS
Maybach HS Lu
A high compression high altitude rated variant
Mb.IV
The Idflieg designation for production HS engines

== Applications ==
- Aero A-24
- Heinkel HE 1
- LVG G.III
- Siemens-Schuckert L.I
- Zeppelin-Lindau Rs.I
- Zeppelin-Staaken VGO.I and VGO.II (1915)

== Specifications (Mb.IV) ==
Data from German & Austro-Hungarian Aero Engines of WWI, Volume 3

=== General characteristics ===
- Type: Straight-six engine
- Bore: 150 mm (5.91 in)
- Stroke: 180 mm (7.09 in)
- Displacement: 19.08 L (1,164.33 cu in)
- Dry weight: 451 kg (994 lb)

=== Components ===
- Fuel system: Dual Maybach carburettors
- Fuel type: Gasoline
- Cooling system: Water-cooled

=== Performance ===
- Power output: 150 kW (200 hp) (rated power at sea level), 180 kW (240 hp) (maximum power at altitude)
- Compression ratio: 5.45:1

== Bibliography ==
- Düsing, Michael (2022). German & Austro-Hungarian Aero Engines of WWI. Vol. 3. Aeronaut Books. ISBN 978-1-953201-53-9.
