= Parabellum MG 14 =

7.92 mm machine gun aircraft armament

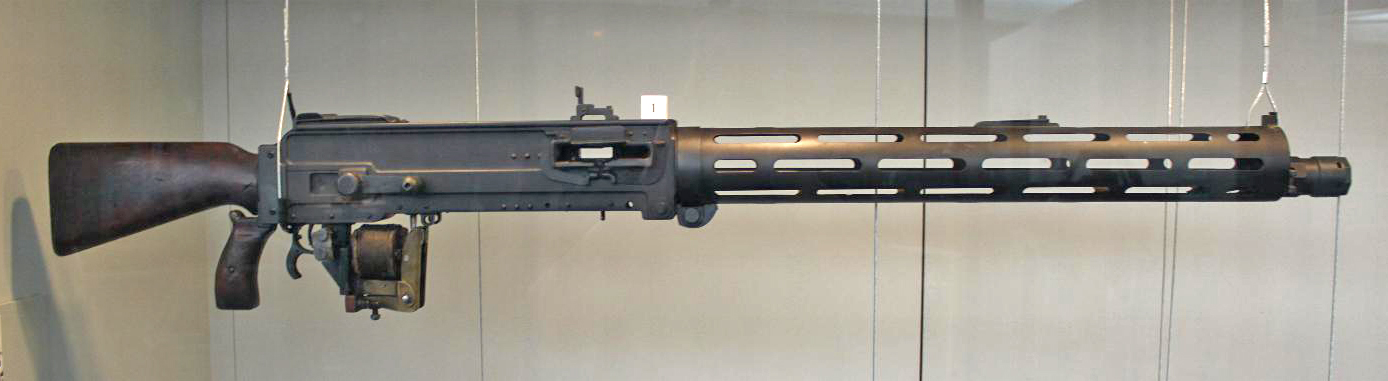
- Early version (1913), with electromagnetic trigger attached
- Type: Aircraft Machine Gun
- Place of origin: Germany

Service history
- In service: 1914–1918
- Used by: (German Empire) Luftstreitkräfte; (Second Polish Republic) Polish Armed Forces; (Latvia) Latvian Army
- Wars: World War I Polish–Soviet War

Production history
- Designer: Karl Heinemann
- Manufacturer: Deutsche Waffen und Munitionsfabriken (DWM)

Specifications
- Mass: 9.5 Kg
- Length: 122 cm
- Barrel length: 70 cm
- Cartridge: 7.92x57mm Mauser
- Caliber: 7.92mm
- Action: Recoil Operated
- Rate of fire: 600-700 rpm
- Feed system: 250-round fabric belt

The Parabellum MG 14 was a 7.92 mm caliber World War I machine gun built by Deutsche Waffen und Munitionsfabriken. It was a redesign of the Maschinengewehr 08 machine gun (itself an adaptation of the Maxim gun) system intended for use on aircraft and zeppelins.

== Design ==
Like the earlier Vickers machine gun, it used a toggle action that broke upwards rather than downwards, the opposite way to the MG 08, making for a much more compact receiver. The fusee spring was replaced with an internal spring design, the breech block was completely different and the spent cartridges dropped out the bottom of the receiver, rather than being ejected forward through a hole under the breech from the receiver. There appear to be no action or receiver parts interchangeable with the MG 08. The MG 08's belt-style ammunition feed was enclosed in a drum, the recoil casing was lightened and the cooling jacket was modified for air- instead of water-cooling. The rate of fire was 700 rounds/minute. The belt was reduced to 30 mm in width.

== Use ==
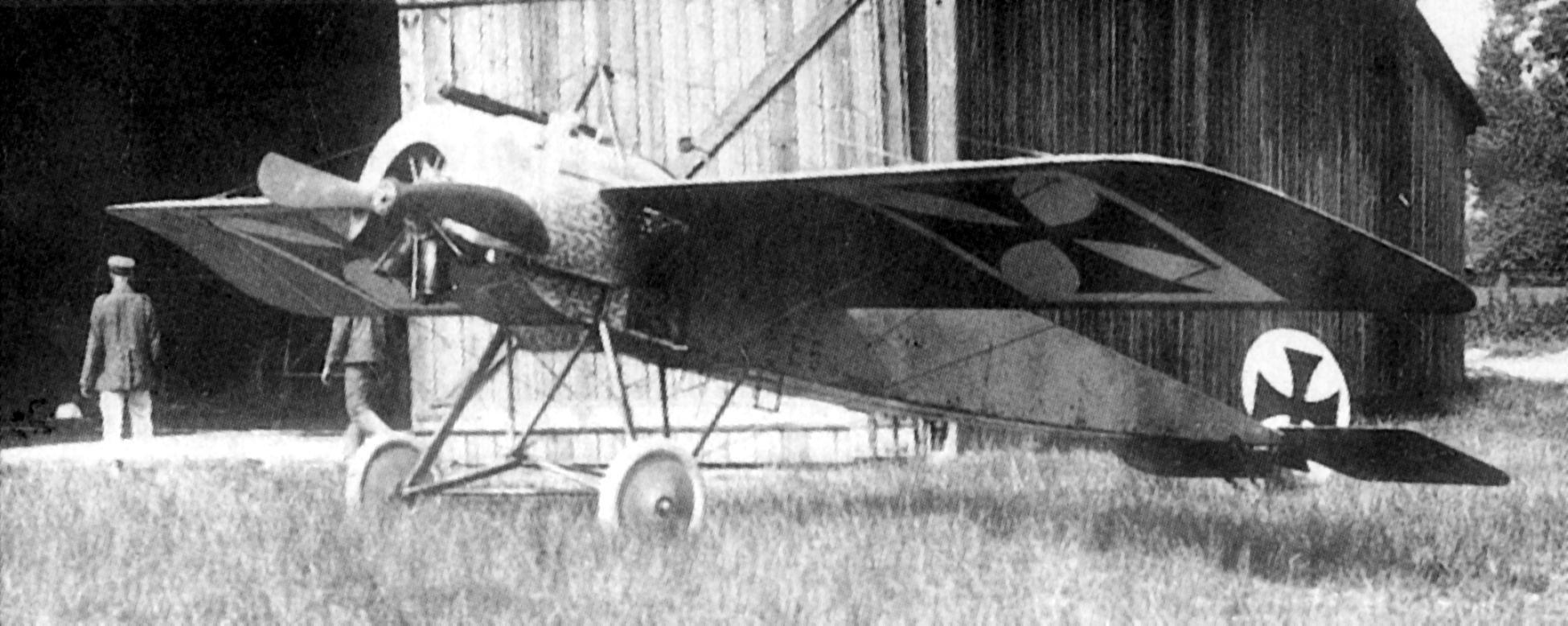
Leutnant Kurt Wintgens' Fokker Eindecker prototype. "E.5/15", which used a Parabellum MG 14 as its synchronized armament in July 1915.

An MG 14 was used in the early development of the German version of the gun synchroniser by Anthony Fokker. The MG 14 was used with the first version of the pioneering Fokker Stangensteuerung synchronizer on the five Fokker M.5K/MG pre-production prototypes for the Fokker E.I. However, the limited supplies of the weapon were more urgently needed for observers in reconnaissance aircraft and defensive gunners aboard Zeppelins and heavier-than-air bombers and it was reserved for flexible mounts where its combination of light weight and high rate of fire were most useful. The weapon was also temperamental when used on the M.5K/MG, as noted by Otto Parschau.

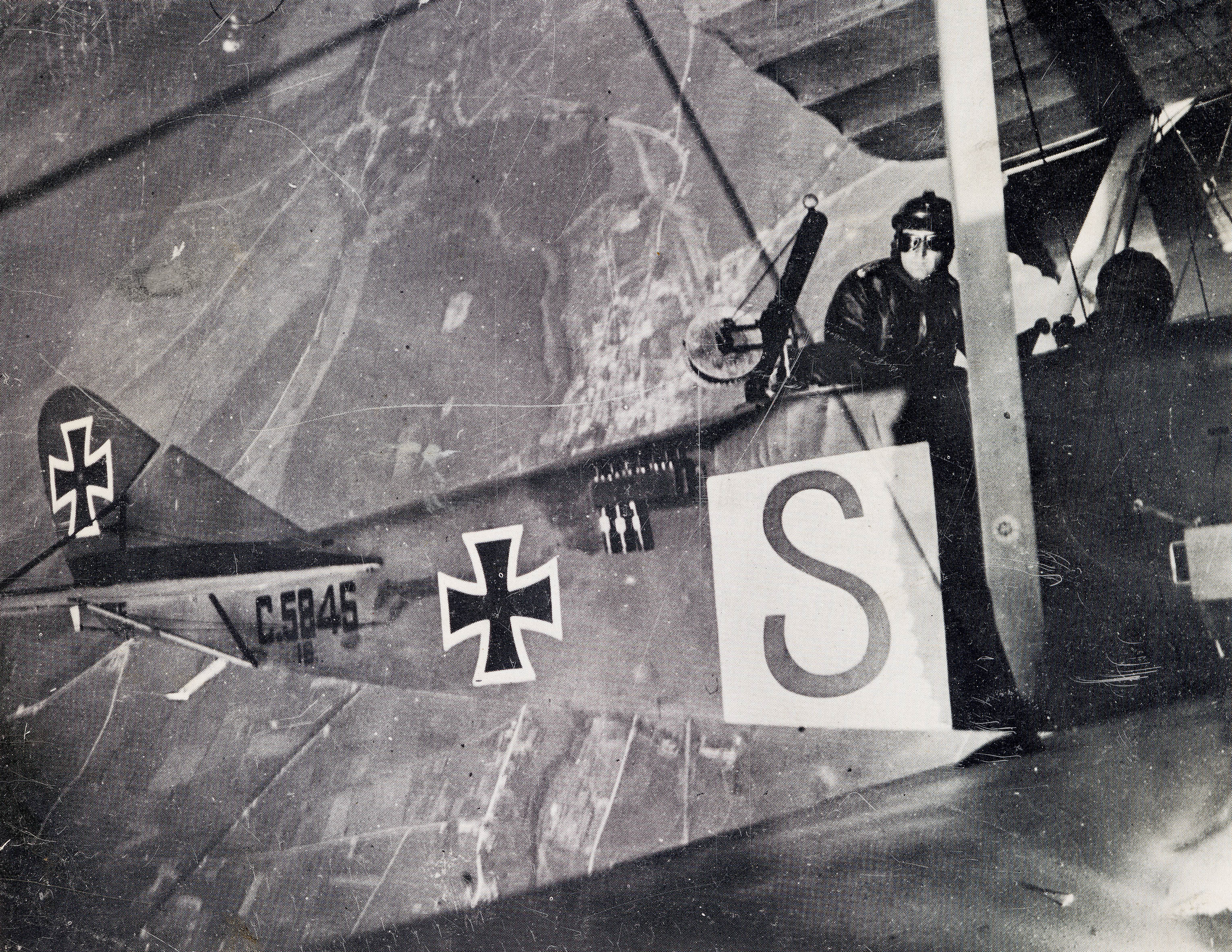
DFW C.V (Av) banking

The MG 14 and subsequent MG 14/17 did make one important contribution to the fixed forward-firing LMG 08 and LMG's 08/15 guns, in that their 30mm wide cloth ammunition belt was compatible with those weapons, The fixed forward-firing guns used fixed ammunition feed guides and judging by surviving photographs, the belts were used exclusively by the Deutsche Luftstreitkräfte for all fixed forward-firing guns. The belts can be readily identified by two grommets (instead of three for the wider MG 08 and MG 08/15 belts used by ground forces) and the lack of extended brass tab (also used by the MG 08 and MG 08/15 ground guns). This not only reduced weight and bulk but it also allowed for much lighter and smaller empty belt chutes, which came out of all LMG 08's and LMG 08/15's and led down into storage bins in the aircraft. At least three versions survive, a water cooled, an air cooled and a 14/17 version with a 3x telescopic sight.

== Operators ==
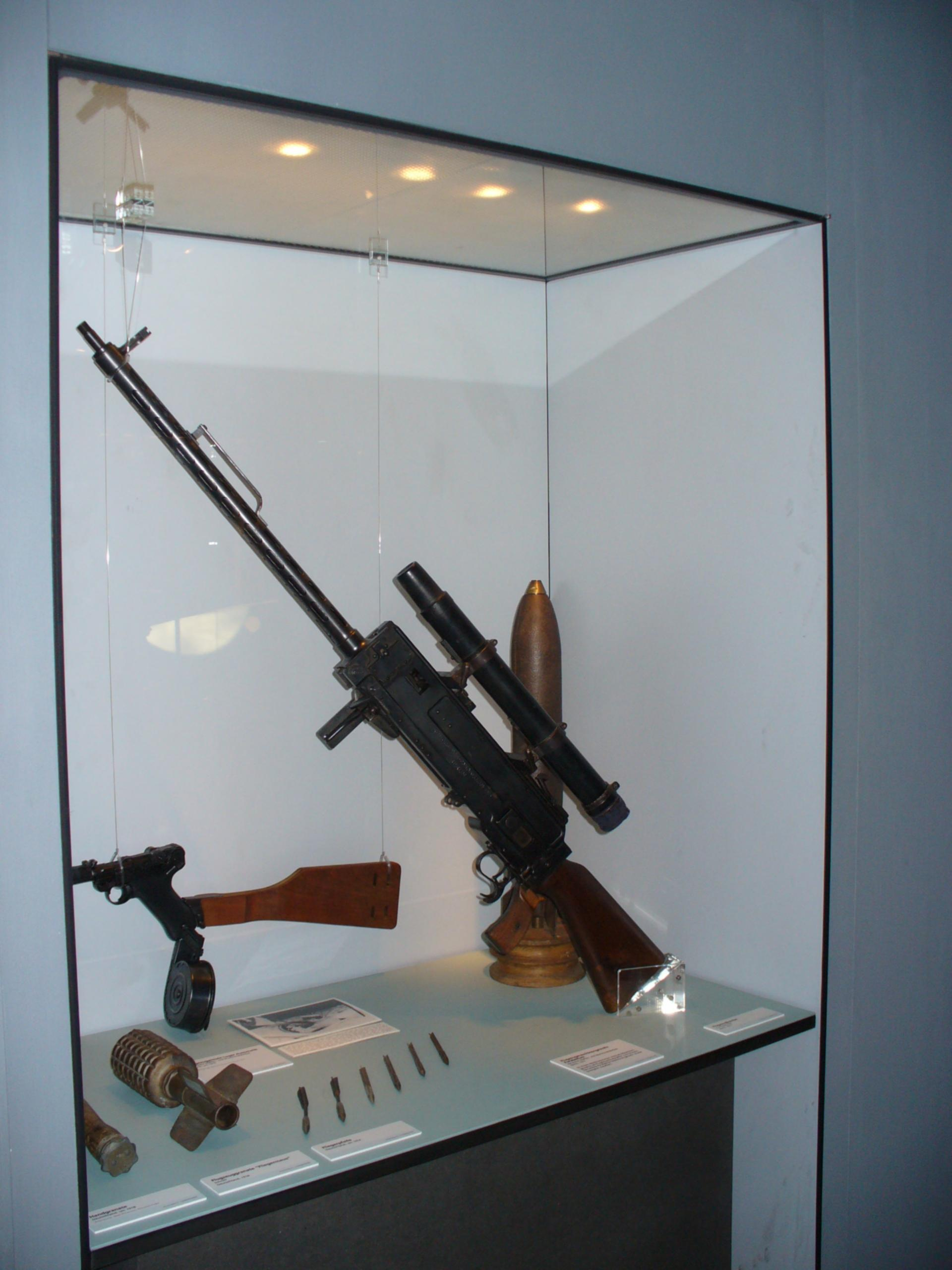
Parabellum MG 14/17 with telescopic sight

- German Empire
- Second Polish Republic: during the Polish–Soviet War
- Latvia: around 115 used by the Latvian Army as the Parabellum machine gun (by April 1936)

== Bibliography ==
- Williams, Anthony G. and Emmanuel Gustin. Flying Guns: World War I and its Aftermath 1914–32. Ramsbury, Wiltshire: Airlife, 2003. ISBN 1-84037-396-2.
- First World War.com
