= List of military aircraft of Germany by manufacturer =

This is a list of German military aircraft organised alphabetically by manufacturer.

== AEG ==
(Allgemeine Elektricitäts-Gesellschaft)

- AEG B.I - reconnaissance
- AEG B.II - reconnaissance
- AEG B.III - reconnaissance
- AEG C.I - reconnaissance
- AEG C.II - reconnaissance
- AEG C.III - reconnaissance
- AEG C.IV - reconnaissance
- AEG C.IVN - night bomber
- AEG C.V - reconnaissance
- AEG C.VI - reconnaissance
- AEG C.VII - reconnaissance
- AEG C.VIII - reconnaissance
- AEG C.VIII Dr - reconnaissance triplane
- AEG D.I - fighter
- AEG DJ.I - armoured ground attack fighter
- AEG Dr.I - triplane fighter
- AEG G.I/K.I - bomber
- AEG G.II - bomber
- AEG G.III - bomber
- AEG G.IV - bomber
- AEG G.V - bomber
- AEG J.I - ground attack aircraft
- AEG J.II - ground attack aircraft
- AEG N.I - night bomber
- AEG PE - armoured triplane ground attack fighter
- AEG R.I - heavy bomber
- AEG R.II - heavy bomber project
- AEG Wagner Eule
- AEG Helicopter - helicopter observation platform, 1933

== AGO ==
(AGO Flugzeugwerke Aktien Gesellschaft Otto/ Aeroplanbau Gustav Otto & Alberti)

- AGO C.I & C.IW - pod and boom pusher reconnaissance biplane
- AGO C.II & C.IIW - pod and boom pusher reconnaissance biplane
- AGO C.III - pod and boom pusher reconnaissance biplane
- AGO C.IV - reconnaissance biplane
- AGO C.VII - reconnaissance biplane
- AGO C.VIII - reconnaissance biplane
- AGO DV.3 - fighter
- AGO S.I - prototype ground attack aircraft
- AGO Ao 192 Kurier - light liaison
- AGO Ao 225 - cancelled heavy fighter project

== Akaflieg München ==
(Akaflieg)

- München Mü-18 Meßkrähe - research motor-glider for testing wing configurations from 1942 to 1945

== Albatros ==
(Albatros Flugzeugwerke GmbH)

- Albatros B.I - reconnaissance
- Albatros B.II - reconnaissance
- Albatros B.III - reconnaissance
- Albatros C.I - reconnaissance
- Albatros C.II - pusher reconnaissance
- Albatros C.III - reconnaissance
- Albatros C.IV - reconnaissance
- Albatros C.V - reconnaissance
- Albatros C.VI - reconnaissance
- Albatros C.VII - reconnaissance
- Albatros C.VIII N - night bomber
- Albatros C.IX - reconnaissance
- Albatros C.X - reconnaissance
- Albatros C.XII - reconnaissance
- Albatros C.XIII - reconnaissance
- Albatros C.XIV - reconnaissance
- Albatros C.XV - reconnaissance
- Albatros D.I - fighter
- Albatros D.II - fighter
- Albatros D.III - fighter
- Albatros D.IV - fighter
- Albatros D.V & Va - fighter
- Albatros D.VI - fighter
- Albatros D.VII - fighter
- Albatros D.VIII - fighter
- Albatros D.IX - fighter
- Albatros D.X - fighter
- Albatros D.XI - fighter
- Albatros D.XII - fighter
- Albatros Dr.I - triplane fighter
- Albatros Dr.II - triplane fighter
- Albatros G.I - bomber
- Albatros G.II - bomber
- Albatros G.III - bomber
- Albatros H.1 - high altitude record aircraft modified from SSW D.IV fighter
- Albatros J.I - ground attack
- Albatros J.II - ground attack
- Albatros L 3 - single seat reconnaissance
- Albatros L 9 - single seat reconnaissance
- Albatros L.65 - reconnaissance fighter biplane built in Lithuania
- Albatros L.68 - trainer
- Albatros L.69 - trainer
- Albatros L.70 - reconnaissance
- Albatros L.74 - trainer
- Albatros L.75 - trainer
- Albatros L.76 - reconnaissance
- Albatros L.77v - reconnaissance
- Albatros L.78 - reconnaissance
- Albatros L.79 - aerobatic/trainer
- Albatros L.81 - experimental aircraft to test the Elektron metal structure
- Albatros L.82 - trainer
- Albatros L.84 - fighter biplane, 1931
- Albatros L.101/Al 101 - sportsplane/trainer, 1930
- Albatros L.102/Al 102 - sportsplane/trainer, 1931
- Albatros L.103/Al 103 - sportsplane/trainer, 1932
- Albatros N.I - night bomber variant of Albatros C.VII
- Albatros W.1 - reconnaissance floatplane
- Albatros W.2 - reconnaissance floatplane
- Albatros W.3 - torpedo bomber floatplane
- Albatros W.4 - floatplane fighter
- Albatros W.5 - torpedo bomber floatplane
- Albatros W.8 - floatplane fighter

== Alter ==
(Ludwig Alter Werke)

- Alter Type AI - fighter

== Arado ==
(Arado Flugzeugwerke GmbH) (For WWII projects see List of German aircraft projects, 1939-1945)

- Arado Ar 64 - fighter biplane
- Arado Ar 65 - fighter/trainer, re-engined Ar 64
- Arado Ar 66 - trainer/night fighter
- Arado Ar 67 - prototype fighter biplane
- Arado Ar 68 - fighter biplane
- Arado Ar 69 - prototype trainer, 1933
- Arado Ar 76 - fighter/trainer
- Arado Ar 80 - fighter prototype
- Arado Ar 81 - prototype two-seat biplane, 1936
- Arado Ar 95 - patrol seaplane
- Arado Ar 96 - trainer
- Arado Ar 195 - lost to Fi-167 for aircraft carrier, floatplane
- Arado Ar 196 - ship-borne reconnaissance floatplane
- Arado Ar 197 - naval fighter derived from Ar 68
- Arado Ar 198 - reconnaissance
- Arado Ar 199 - seaplane trainer
- Arado Ar 231 - folding-wing U-boat reconnaissance prototype
- Arado Ar 232 Tausenfüßler - transport
- Arado Ar 233 - seaplane concept, 1940
- Arado Ar 234 Blitz - jet bomber
- Arado Ar 240 - heavy fighter
- Arado Ar 396 - trainer
- Arado Ar 440 - heavy fighter + attack
- Arado Ar 532 - cancelled transport

== Argus ==
(Argus Motoren GmbH)

- Argus As 292 - see DFS Mo 12

== Aviatik ==
(Automobil und Aviatik AG)

- Aviatik B.I - reconnaissance
- Aviatik B.II - reconnaissance
- Aviatik C.I - reconnaissance
- Aviatik C.II - reconnaissance
- Aviatik C.III - reconnaissance
- Aviatik C.V - reconnaissance
- Aviatik C.VI - reconnaissance
- Aviatik C.VII - reconnaissance
- Aviatik C.VIII - reconnaissance
- Aviatik C.IX - reconnaissance
- Aviatik D.I - fighter (Halberstadt D.II)
- Aviatik D.II - fighter
- Aviatik D.III - fighter
- Aviatik D.IV - fighter
- Aviatik D.V - fighter
- Aviatik D.VI - fighter
- Aviatik D.VII - fighter
- Aviatik Dr.I - triplane fighter
- Aviatik G.I - bomber
- Aviatik G.III - bomber
- Aviatik R.III - bomber

== Bachem ==
( Bachem-Werke)

- Bachem Ba 349 Natter
- Ba BP 20 Manned Flak Rocket - early Ba-349s, some with landing gear for flight testing

== Baumgärtl ==
(Paul Baumgärtl)

- Baumgärtl Heliofly I - backpack helicopter
- Baumgärtl Heliofly III/57 - backpack helicopter
- Baumgärtl Heliofly III/59 - one-man helicopter
- Baumgärtl PB-60 - experimental single-seat rotor kite
- Baumgärtl PB-63 - single-seat helicopter
- Baumgärtl PB-64 - single-seat helicopter

== Akaflieg Berlin ==
(Flugtechnische Fachgruppe)

- Berlin B 9 - prone pilot research aircraft

== BFW ==
(Bayerische Flugzeugwerke)

- BFW CL.I - light reconnaissance/close support
- BFW CL.II - light reconnaissance/close support
- BFW CL.III - light reconnaissance/close support
- BFW Monoplane 1918
- BFW N.I - night bomber

== Blohm & Voss ==
(Blohm & Voss and Hamburger Flugzeugbau) (For WWII projects with no RLM designation see: List of German aircraft projects, 1939-1945)

- Blohm & Voss BV 40 - glider interceptor
- Blohm & Voss BV 138 - flying-boat, was designated Ha 138
- Blohm & Voss Ha 139 - transatlantic airmail floatplane, one modified for reconnaissance and minesweeping
- Blohm & Voss Ha 140 - torpedo bomber flyingboat prototype
- Blohm & Voss BV 141 - asymmetric reconnaissance prototypes
- Blohm & Voss BV 142 - reconnaissance/transport
- Blohm & Voss BV 143 - glide bomb prototype
- Blohm & Voss BV 144 - transport
- Blohm & Voss BV 155 - high-altitude interceptor, was Me 155
- Blohm & Voss BV 222 Wiking - transport flying-boat
- Blohm & Voss BV 238 - flying-boat prototype
- Blohm & Voss BV 246 Hagelkorn - glide bomb, "Radieschen" anti-radar version
- Blohm & Voss BV L.10 Friedensengel - torpedo glider
- Blohm & Voss BV L.11 Schneewittchen - torpedo glider

== Bücker ==
(Bücker Flugzeugbau)

- Bücker Bü 131 Jungmann - trainer
- Bücker Bü 133 Jungmeister - trainer
- Bücker Bü 134 - trainer
- Bücker Bü 180 Student - trainer
- Bücker Bü 181 Bestmann - trainer
- Bücker Bü 182 Kornett - trainer

== Caspar ==
(Caspar-Werke)

- Caspar D.I - twin-engine single-seat fighter
- Caspar U.1 - submarine aircraft

== Daimler ==
(Daimler-Motoren-Gesellschaft Werke)

- Daimler CL.I - light reconnaissance/close support
- Daimler D.II - fighter
- Daimler G.I/R.I - heavy bomber
- Daimler G.II/R.II - heavy bomber
- Daimler L6/D.I - fighter
- Daimler L8 - fighter
- Daimler L9 - fighter
- Daimler L11 - parasol fighter
- Daimler L14 - parasol fighter

== DFL ==
(Deutsche Forschungsanstalt für Luftfahrt - Research Institute in Braunschweig)

- LT 9.2 Frosch - torpedo glider

== DFS ==
(Deutsche Forschungsanstalt für Segelflug)

- DFS See Adler - seaplane research aircraft
- DFS Mo 6 - target glider prototypes, 1936
- DFS Mo 12 - target drone re-designated Argus As-292, first photo reconnaissance RPV
- DFS 39 - Lippisch-designed tail-less research aircraft
- DFS 40 - Lippisch-designed tail-less research aircraft
- DFS 108-49 Granau Baby - 1932 glider
- DFS 108-?? Kranich - 1935 glider
- DFS 108-68 Weihe - 1938 glider
- DFS 108-70 Olympia - planned 1940 Olympics glider
- DFS 194 - rocket-powered research aircraft, forerunner of Me 163
- DFS 228 - rocket-powered reconnaissance prototype
- DFS 230 - transport glider
- DFS 331 - transport glider prototype
- DFS 332 - wing section research
- DFS 346 - supersonic research, reached Mach 1 in USSR
- DFS 464 - project rocket carrier aircraft for DFS 360

== DFW ==
(Deutsche Flugzeug-Werke)

- DFW Mars - reconnaissance
- DFW B.I - reconnaissance
- DFW B.II - reconnaissance
- DFW C.I - reconnaissance
- DFW C.II - reconnaissance
- DFW C.IV - reconnaissance
- DFW C.V - reconnaissance
- DFW C.VI - reconnaissance
- DFW D.I - fighter
- DFW Dr.I - triplane fighter
- DFW D.II - fighter
- DFW F 34 - fighter
- DFW F 37 - reconnaissance
- DFW R.I - heavy bomber
- DFW R.II - heavy bomber
- DFW R.III - cancelled heavy bomber
- DFW T.28 Floh - fighter prototype

== Dornier ==
(Dornier Flugzeugwerke GmbH)

- Dornier Do C - bomber
- Dornier Do D - torpedo bomber for Yugoslavia
- Dornier Do H - fighter
- Dornier Do M - heavy bomber
- Dornier Do N - bomber for Japan
- Dornier Do P - heavy bomber
- Dornier Do 10/Do C1 - fighter prototype, 1931
- Dornier Do 11/Do F - medium bomber, 1931
- Dornier Do 12 Libelle - seaplane
- Dornier Do 13 - medium bomber, 1933
- Dornier Do 14 - seaplane prototype
- Dornier Do 16 Wal - reconnaissance flying-boat
- Dornier Do 17 - bomber/reconnaissance/night-fighter
- Dornier Do 18 - bomber/reconnaissance flying-boat, 1935
- Dornier Do 19 Uralbomber - four engine heavy bomber prototype
- Dornier Do 22 - torpedo bomber + reconnaissance flying-boat
- Dornier Do 23 - heavy bomber
- Dornier Do 24 - flying boat
- Dornier Do 26 - flying boat transport
- Dornier Do 214 - transport flying-boat prototype
- Dornier Do 215 - bomber/night-fighter
- Dornier Do 217 - bomber/night-fighter
- Dornier Do 288 - unofficial cover designation for captured B-17s used by KG 200.
- Dornier Do 317 - heavy bomber
- Dornier Do 335 Pfeil - twin-engine fighter-bomber
- Dornier Do 417 - twin-boom project
- Dornier Do 435 - Do 335 variant with longer wings
- Dornier Do 635 - Do 335 variant with twin fuselage

== EMW ==
(Elektro Mechanische Werke)

- EMW A-4B piloted V-2 missile project
- EMW A-6 piloted V-2 missile project with aux. ramjet, origin of the X-15 rocketplane
- EMW A-9/A-10 piloted A-9/A-10 ICBM project

== Euler ==
(Euler-Werke)

- Euler B.I - reconnaissance
- Euler B.II - reconnaissance
- Euler B.III - reconnaissance
- Euler C - reconnaissance pusher
- Euler D.I - fighter, copy of Nieuport
- Euler D.II - fighter
- Euler D - fighter (possibly D.III)
- Euler Dr.I - triplane fighter
- Euler Dr.2 - triplane fighter
- Euler Dr.3 - triplane fighter
- Euler Dr.4 - triplane trainer
- Euler Pusher Einsitzer - fighter
- Euler Quadruplane - fighter

== Fieseler ==
(Gerhard Fieseler Werke GmbH)

- Fieseler F-2/Fi 2 acrobatic sportsplane, 1932
- Fieseler F-5/Fi 5 acrobatic sportsplane/trainer, 1933
- Fieseler Fi 98 - biplane fighter, 1936
- Fieseler Fi 99 Jungtiger - light utility aircraft, 1938
- Fieseler Fi 103/V-1 - flying bomb
- Fieseler Fi 103R Series - Reichenberg manned V-1 suicide craft
- Fieseler Fi 156 Storch - STOL liaison aircraft
- Fieseler Fi 158 - research aircraft
- Fieseler Fi 166 - jet aircraft project
- Fieseler Fi 167 - ship-borne torpedo bomber/reconnaissance biplane
- Fieseler Fi 256 - development of Fi 156, two prototypes
- Fieseler Fi-333 - transport concept

== Flettner ==
(Flettner Flugzeugbau GmbH and Anton Flettner G.m.b.H.)

- Flettner Gigant - helicopter, two huge rotors, 1933
- Flettner Fl 184 - auto-gyro, 1933
- Flettner Fl 185 - helicopter
- Flettner Fl 265 - based on Fl 185 but with intermeshing rotors
- Flettner Fl 282 Kolibri - naval reconnaissance helicopter
- Flettner Fl 336 - large transport helicopter project
- Flettner Fl 339 - flying platform project

== Focke-Achgelis ==
(Focke-Achgelis & Co. GmbH)

- Focke Achgelis Fa 223 Drache - transport helicopter (prototype
- Focke Achgelis Fa 225 - towed assault helo-glider prototype
- Focke Achgelis Fa 266 Hornisse - helicopter prototype
- Focke Achgelis Fa 269 - tilt-wing pursuit helicopter project
- Focke Achgelis Fa 283 - jet helicopter project
- Focke Achgelis Fa 284 - heavy-lift helicopter project
- Focke Achgelis Fa 330 Bachstelze - towed autogyro prototype
- Focke Achgelis Fa 336 - scout helicopter prototype, 1944, manufactured in France postwar

== Focke-Wulf ==
(Focke-Wulf Flugzeugbau GmbH)

- Focke-Wulf Fw 42 - bomber project, 1929
- Focke-Wulf Fw 44 Stieglitz - trainer
- Focke-Wulf Fw 56 Stosser - trainer
- Focke-Wulf Fw 57 - heavy fighter/bomber prototype
- Focke-Wulf Fw 58 Weihe - transport/trainer
- Focke-Wulf Fw 61 - helicopter prototype
- Focke-Wulf Fw 62 - ship-borne reconnaissance seaplane
- Focke-Wulf Ta 152 - Fw 190 variant
- Focke-Wulf Ta 154 Moskito - night-fighter
- Focke-Wulf Fw 159 - fighter prototype
- Focke-Wulf Ta 183 Huckebein - jet fighter prototype
- Focke-Wulf Fw 186 - autogiro reconnaissance prototype
- Focke-Wulf Fw 187 Falke - heavy fighter
- Focke-Wulf Fw 189 Uhu - reconnaissance
- Focke-Wulf Fw 190 Würger - fighter
- Focke-Wulf Fw 191 - medium bomber prototype
- Focke-Wulf Fw 200 Condor - transport/maritime patrol-bomber
- Focke-Wulf Super Lorin - ramjet-powered fighter project
- Focke-Wulf Fw 259 Frontjäger - fighter project
- Focke-Wulf Fw Ta 283 - ramjet fighter project
- Focke-Wulf Fw 300 - proposed long-range version of Fw 200
- Focke-Wulf Ta 400 - long-range bomber project
- Focke-Wulf P.VI Flitzer - twin-boom fighter, mock-up built
- Focke-Wulf Volksjäger - rocket-powered emergency fighter project
- Focke-Wulf Fw Triebflügel - thrust-wing ramjet coleopter project
- Focke-Wulf Rochen - circular wing project

== Fokker ==
(Fokker Aviatik GmbH)

- Fokker A.I (M.8) - reconnaissance monoplane
- Fokker A.II (M.5L) - reconnaissance monoplane
- Fokker A.III (M.5K) - reconnaissance monoplane, armed version designated E.I
- Fokker B.I (1915) (M.10E) - reconnaissance biplane for Austria-Hungary
- Fokker B.II (1916) (M.10Z) - reconnaissance biplane for Austria-Hungary
- Fokker B.III (M.17) - reconnaissance/fighter for Austria-Hungary
- Fokker C.I - reconnaissance, first 70 examples built in Germany and shipped to Netherlands.
- Fokker D.I (M.18Z) - fighter
- Fokker D.II (M.17Z) - fighter
- Fokker D.III (M.20Z) - fighter
- Fokker D.IV - fighter
- Fokker D.V (M.22) - fighter
- Fokker D.VI - fighter
- Fokker D.VII - fighter
- Fokker D.VIII - fighter
- Fokker F.I/Dr.I - triplane fighter
- Fokker E.I - monoplane fighter
- Fokker E.II - monoplane fighter
- Fokker E.III - monoplane fighter
- Fokker E.IV - monoplane fighter
- Fokker M.6 - reconnaissance parasol
- Fokker M.7 - reconnaissance sesquiplane
- Fokker K.I (M.9) - battleplane
- Fokker M.16
- Fokker V.1 - prototype fighter
- Fokker V.2 - prototype fighter
- Fokker V.3 - prototype for Dr.I fighter
- Fokker V.4 - prototype for Dr.I fighter
- Fokker V.5 - prototype for Dr.I fighter
- Fokker V.6 - prototype triplane fighter
- Fokker V.7 - prototype triplane fighter
- Fokker V.8 - prototype 5 wing fighter
- Fokker V.9 - prototype biplane fighter
- Fokker V.10 - prototype triplane fighter
- Fokker V.11 - prototype for D.VII fighter
- Fokker V.12 - prototype for D.VI fighter
- Fokker V.13 - prototype for D.VI fighter
- Fokker V.14 - prototype for D.VI fighter
- Fokker V.16 - prototype for D.VI fighter
- Fokker V.17 - prototype monoplane fighter
- Fokker V.18 - prototype for D.VII fighter
- Fokker V.20 - prototype monoplane fighter
- Fokker V.21 - prototype for D.VII fighter
- Fokker V.22 - prototype for D.VII fighter
- Fokker V.23 - prototype monoplane fighter
- Fokker V.24 - prototype for D.VII fighter
- Fokker V.25 - prototype monoplane fighter
- Fokker V.26 - prototype for D.VIII monoplane fighter
- Fokker V.27 - prototype monoplane fighter
- Fokker V.28 - prototype for D.VIII monoplane fighter
- Fokker V.29 - prototype for parasol monoplane version of D.VII fighter
- Fokker V.30 - prototype for glider version of D.VIII monoplane fighter
- Fokker V.31 - D.VII fighter modified to tow V.30
- Fokker V.33 - prototype D.VI fighter
- Fokker V.34 - prototype D.VII fighter with BMW engine
- Fokker V.35 - prototype D.VII fighter variant
- Fokker V.36 - prototype D.VII fighter variant
- Fokker V.37 - armoured variant of V.27 monoplane
- Fokker V.38 - prototype for C.I
- Fokker W.4 - reconnaissance floatplane derived from M.7

== Friedrichshafen ==
(Flugzeugbau Friedrichshafen GmbH)

- Friedrichshafen C.I - reconnaissance
- Friedrichshafen D.I - fighter
- Friedrichshafen D.II
- Friedrichshafen D type Quadruplane - fighter
- Friedrichshafen FF.1
- Friedrichshafen FF.2
- Friedrichshafen FF.4
- Friedrichshafen FF.7
- Friedrichshafen FF.8
- Friedrichshafen FF.11
- Friedrichshafen FF.17
- Friedrichshafen FF.19
- Friedrichshafen FF.21
- Friedrichshafen FF.29 - reconnaissance floatplane
- Friedrichshafen FF.30
- Friedrichshafen FF.31 - pusher reconnaissance floatplane
- Friedrichshafen FF.33 - reconnaissance floatplane
- Friedrichshafen FF.34 - reconnaissance pusher floatplane
- Friedrichshafen FF.35 - torpedo bomber floatplane
- Friedrichshafen FF.37 - reconnaissance pusher
- Friedrichshafen FF.39 - reconnaissance floatplane
- Friedrichshafen FF.40 - reconnaissance floatplane
- Friedrichshafen FF.41 - torpedo bomber floatplane
- Friedrichshafen FF.43 - floatplane fighter
- Friedrichshafen FF.44 - reconnaissance floatplane
- Friedrichshafen FF.45
- Friedrichshafen FF.46
- Friedrichshafen FF.48 - floatplane fighter
- Friedrichshafen FF.49 - reconnaissance/bomber floatplane
- Friedrichshafen FF.53 - torpedo bomber
- Friedrichshafen FF.54
- Friedrichshafen FF.59 - reconnaissance floatplane
- Friedrichshafen FF.60 - long range patrol triplane floatplane
- Friedrichshafen FF.61
- Friedrichshafen FF.62 - heavy bomber, may have been G.V
- Friedrichshafen FF.63 - floatplane monoplane
- Friedrichshafen FF.64 - reconnaissance floatplane
- Friedrichshafen FF.66
- Friedrichshafen FF.67
- Friedrichshafen FF.71
- Friedrichshafen G.I - heavy bomber
- Friedrichshafen G.II - heavy bomber
- Friedrichshafen G.III & IIIa - heavy bomber - heavy bomber
- Friedrichshafen G.IV - heavy bomber
- Friedrichshafen G.V
- Friedrichshafen N.I - night bomber

== Geest ==
- 1916 single-seat fighter

== Geratwerk-Stargard ==
- Geratwerk-Stargard Lt.50 - glide bomb project

== Germania ==
- Germania type B - reconnaissance, 1915
- Germania type C/K.D.D. - fighter
- Germania C.I - reconnaissance
- Germania C.II - reconnaissance
- Germania C.IV - trainer
- Germania JM - unarmed single-seater, 1916

== Gödecker ==
- Gödecker B type - trainer

== Göppingen ==
(Sportsflugzeuge Göppingen)

- Göppingen Gö 1 Wolf I - sailplane, 1935
- Göppingen Gö 3 Minimoa - sailplane, 1936
- Göppingen Gö 4 - sailplane
- Göppingen Gö 5 - sailplane, 1937 (may be RLM #5, unlikely though)
- Goppingen Go 8 - development aircraft for Do 214
- Göppingen Gö 9 - development aircraft for pusher propeller used on Do 335 Pfeil

== Gotha ==
(Gothaer Waggonfabrik)

- Gotha LD.1/2/6/7 - training/reconnaissance/bomber biplanes
- Gotha LD.5 - single seat reconnaissance
- Gotha LE.3 Taube - monoplane
- Gotha WD.1 - reconnaissance floatplane
- Gotha WD.2/5/9/12/13/15 - reconnaissance floatplanes
- Gotha WD.3 - pusher reconnaissance floatplane
- Gotha WD.7 - twin-engined seaplane trainer/reconnaissance biplane
- Gotha WD.8 - single-engined seaplane trainer/reconnaissance biplane
- Gotha WD.11 - torpedo bomber floatplane
- Gotha WD.14/20/22 - torpedo bomber floatplanes
- Gotha WD.27 - large patrol floatplane
- Gotha G.I/UWD - heavy bomber
- Gotha G.II - heavy bomber
- Gotha G.III - heavy bomber
- Gotha G.IV - heavy bomber
- Gotha G.V - heavy bomber
- Gotha G.VI - asymmetric heavy bomber
- Gotha GL.VII - high speed reconnaissance bomber
- Gotha GL.VIII - high speed bomber
- Gotha G.IX - high speed bomber built by LVG
- Gotha G.X - high speed reconnaissance
- Gotha Go 145 - trainer
- Gotha Go 146 - transport, 1935
- Gotha Go 147 - STOL reconnaissance prototype
- Gotha Go 229 - jet flying wing fighter
- Gotha Go 242 - transport glider
- Gotha Go 244 - transport
- Gotha Go 345 - assault glider
- Gotha Ka 430 - transport glider

== Halberstadt ==
(Halberstädter Flugzeugwerke GmbH)

- Halberstadt type B - reconnaissance
- Halberstadt B.I - reconnaissance
- Halberstadt B.II - reconnaissance
- Halberstadt B.III - reconnaissance
- Halberstadt C.I - reconnaissance
- Halberstadt C.III - reconnaissance
- Halberstadt C.V - reconnaissance
- Halberstadt C.VII - reconnaissance
- Halberstadt C.VIII - reconnaissance
- Halberstadt C.IX - reconnaissance
- Halberstadt CL.II - light reconnaissance/close support
- Halberstadt CL.IV - light reconnaissance/close support
- Halberstadt CLS.I - light reconnaissance/close support
- Halberstadt D.I - fighter
- Halberstadt D.II - fighter
- Halberstadt D.III - fighter
- Halberstadt D.IV - fighter
- Halberstadt D.V - fighter
- Halberstadt G.I - heavy bomber

== Hannover ==
(Hannoversche Waggonfabrik AG)

- Hannover C.I - license-built Aviatik C.I
- Hannover CL.II - light reconnaissance/close support
- Hannover CL.III - light reconnaissance/close support
- Hannover CL.IV - light reconnaissance/close support
- Hannover CL.V - light reconnaissance/close support

== Hannuschke ==
- Hannuschke monoplane - single seat scout, 1915

== Hergt ==
- Hergt monoplane - fighter, 1918

== Hansa-Brandenburg ==
(Hansa und Brandenburgische Flugzeugwerke)

- Hansa-Brandenburg B.I - reconnaissance
- Hansa-Brandenburg CC - flying boat fighter for Austrian Navy
- Hansa-Brandenburg D
- Hansa-Brandenburg FB - flying boat
- Hansa-Brandenburg FD
- Hansa-Brandenburg GDW - torpedo bomber floatplane
- Hansa-Brandenburg GNW - reconnaissance floatplane
- Hansa-Brandenburg GW - torpedo bomber floatplane
- Hansa-Brandenburg KW - reconnaissance floatplane
- Hansa-Brandenburg KDW - floatplane fighter
- Hansa-Brandenburg L.14 - fighter
- Hansa-Brandenburg L.16 - fighter
- Hansa-Brandenburg LW - reconnaissance floatplane
- Hansa-Brandenburg NW - reconnaissance floatplane
- Hansa-Brandenburg W - reconnaissance floatplane
- Hansa-Brandenburg W.11 - floatplane fighter
- Hansa-Brandenburg W.12 - floatplane fighter
- Hansa-Brandenburg W.13 - flying boat for Austria-Hungary
- Hansa-Brandenburg W.16 - floatplane fighter
- Hansa-Brandenburg W.17 - floatplane fighter
- Hansa-Brandenburg W.18 - flying boat fighter
- Hansa-Brandenburg W.19 - reconnaissance floatplane
- Hansa-Brandenburg W.20 - flying boat fighter
- Hansa-Brandenburg W.23
- Hansa-Brandenburg W.25 - floatplane fighter
- Hansa-Brandenburg W.26 - reconnaissance floatplane
- Hansa-Brandenburg W.27 - floatplane fighter
- Hansa-Brandenburg W.29 - floatplane fighter
- Hansa-Brandenburg W.32 - floatplane fighter
- Hansa-Brandenburg W.33 - floatplane fighter
- Hansa-Brandenburg W.34

== Heinkel ==
(Heinkel Flugzeugwerke)

- Heinkel He 37 - fighter biplane
- Heinkel He 38 - fighter biplane
- Heinkel He 43 - fighter biplane
- Heinkel He 45 - bomber/trainer
- Heinkel He 46 - reconnaissance
- Heinkel He 49 - fighter biplane
- Heinkel He 50 - reconnaissance/dive bomber biplane
- Heinkel He 51 - fighter/close-support biplane
- Heinkel He 59 - reconnaissance biplane floatplane
- Heinkel He 60 - ship-borne reconnaissance biplane floatplane
- Heinkel He 70 Blitz - transport, 1932
- Heinkel He 72 Kadett - trainer
- Heinkel He 74 - fighter/advanced trainer prototype
- Heinkel He 100 - fighter
- Heinkel He 111 - bomber
- Heinkel He 111Z Zwilling - 2 He 111s joined with 5th engine used for towing
- Heinkel He 112 - fighter
- Heinkel He 113 - propaganda designation for He 100
- Heinkel He 114 - reconnaissance seaplane
- Heinkel He 115 - general-purpose seaplane
- Heinkel He 116 - transport/reconnaissance
- Heinkel He 118 - dive bomber, two to Japan, testbed for turbojet HeS 3A in 1939
- Heinkel He 119 - high speed recon bomber, record setter, two to Japan
- Heinkel He 162 Volksjäger - jet fighter
- Heinkel He 170 - reconnaissance/bomber, for Hungary
- Heinkel He 172 - trainer prototype
- Heinkel He 176 - rocket propelled experimental aircraft
- Heinkel He 177 - heavy bomber
- Heinkel He 178 - jet-engined experimental aircraft
- Heinkel He 219 - night-fighter
- Heinkel He 270 - reconnaissance/bomber prototype
- Heinkel He 274 - high-altitude bomber
- Heinkel He 277 - four-engined He-177, one modified for single "Superbomb" of unknown type
- Heinkel He 280 - jet fighter
- Heinkel He 343 - jet bomber project
- Heinkel P.1077 - rocket fighter, two prototypes 90% complete at defeat, further versions planned
- Heinkel Lerche - VTOL interceptor project
- Heinkel Wespe - VTOL interceptor project

== Henschel ==
(Henschel & Son)

- Henschel Hs 117 - surface-to-air missile
- Henschel Hs 121 - fighter/trainer prototype
- Henschel Hs 122 - army co-operation, 2nd prototype became Hs 125
- Henschel Hs 123 - ground-attack biplane
- Henschel Hs 124 - heavy fighter/bomber prototype
- Henschel Hs 125 - fighter/trainer prototype
- Henschel Hs 126 - reconnaissance
- Henschel Hs 127 - high speed bomber prototype
- Henschel Hs 129 - ground-attack
- Henschel Hs 130 - high altitude jet reconnaissance/bomber prototype
- Henschel Hs 132 - jet dive bomber prototype
- Henschel Hs 293 - rocket propelled glide bomb
- Henschel Hs 294 - rocket propelled anti-shipping glide bomb
- Henschel Hs 295 - rocket propelled torpedo glider
- Henschel Hs 296 - rocket propelled torpedo glider
- Henschel Hs 297 - rocket propelled torpedo glider
- Henschel Hs 298 - air-to-air missile
- Henschel Hs 315 - missile project
- Henschel Hs GT 1200 - anti-shipping rocket-assisted glide bomb
- Henschel Zitterrochen Torpedofish - supersonic missile

== Horten ==
(Horten brothers)

- Horten Parabola - parabolic flying wing prototype
- Horten H.XIII - delta jet fighter project
- Horten H.XVIIIB Amerika Bomber - project

== Hütter ==
(Ulrich Hütter and Wolfgang Hütter)

- Hütter Hü 136 - dive bomber project, 1938
- Hutter Hü Fernzerstorer - 1942 destroyer project
- Hütter Hü 211 - Improved He 219, 2 built in 1944, destroyed in bombing raid

== Jeannin ==
(Fabrik und Jeannin Flugzeugbau)

- Jeannin Taube - reconnaissance monoplane, 1914
- Jeannin biplane - reconnaissance biplane, 1915

== Junkers ==
(Junkers Flugzeug und Motorenwerke AG)

- Junkers J 1 - experimental monoplane
- Junkers J 2/E.I - monoplane fighter, 1916
- Junkers J 3 - abandoned development of J 2
- Junkers J 4/J.I - ground attack, 1917
- Junkers J 7 - fighter prototype, led to D.I
- Junkers J 8/CL.I - ground attack, 1917
- Junkers J 9/D.I - fighter, 1917
- Junkers J 11/CLS.I - seaplane two-seat fighter
- Junkers A 20 - fighter
- Junkers A 35
- Junkers K 39 - bomber prototype
- Junkers K 47 - dive bomber
- Junkers Ju W33 - transport, 1926
- Junkers Ju W34 - transport/reconnaissance, 1933
- Junkers Ju 52 - transport/bomber
- Junkers Ju 86 - bomber/reconnaissance
- Junkers Ju 87 Stuka - dive-bomber
- Junkers Ju 88 - bomber/reconnaissance + night-fighter
- Junkers Ju 89 - heavy bomber prototype
- Junkers Ju 90 - heavy bomber prototype
- Junkers Ju 187 - prototype incomplete before cancellation
- Junkers Ju 188 Rächer - bomber
- Junkers Ju 248 - redesignated Me 263
- Junkers Ju 252 - transport
- Junkers Ju 287 - jet heavy bomber prototype
- Junkers Ju 288 - bomber prototype
- Junkers Ju 290 - long-range bomber prototype
- Junkers Ju 322 Mammut - assault glider
- Junkers Ju 352 Herkules - transport
- Junkers Ju 388 Stortebeker - reconnaissance/night-fighter
- Junkers Ju 390 - long-range bomber
- Junkers Ju 488 - heavy bomber
- Junkers EF 61 - high-altitude fighter/reconnaissance prototype
- Junkers EF 126 - pulsejet fighter completed in USSR in 1947
- Junkers EF 131 - Ju-287 derivative, completed in USSR in 1946
- Junkers EF 132 - advanced heavy bomber
- Junkers EF 140 - bomber completed in the USSR postwar
- Junkers EF 150 - bomber completed in the USSR postwar
- Junkers EF 152 - bomber project, became East German Baade 152 airliner cancelled by Soviets

== Klemm ==
(Klemm Leichtflugzeugbau GmbH)

- Klemm Kl 25 - sportplane
- Klemm Kl 31 - sportplane, 1931
- Klemm Kl 32 - sportplane, 1931
- Klemm Kl 33 - single-seat sportplane prototype, 1933
- Klemm Kl 35 - sportplane/trainer, 1935
- Klemm Kl 35Z Zwilling - twin fuselage Kl 35 to test theory of Messerschmitt Bf 109Z
- Klemm Kl 36 - sportplane, 1934

== Kondor ==
(Kondor Flugzeugwerke GmbH)

- Kondor Taube - reconnaissance
- Kondor W.1 - two-seater
- Kondor W.2C - reconnaissance
- Kondor B.I - trainer
- Kondor D.I - sesquiplane fighter
- Kondor D.II - biplane fighter
- Kondor D.6 - biplane fighter
- Kondor D.7 - sesquiplane fighter, 1917
- Kondor E.III & IIIa - monoplane fighter, 1918

== KW (Danzig) ==
(Kaiserliche Werft Danzig - German Navy Shipyard)

- Kaiserliche Werft Danzig 404 - floatplane trainer
- Kaiserliche Werft Danzig 467 - floatplane trainer
- Kaiserliche Werft Danzig 1105 - floatplane trainer
- Kaiserliche Werft Danzig 1650 - reconnaissance floatplane

== KW (Kiel) ==
(Kaiserliche Werft Kiel - German Navy Shipyard)

- Kaiserliche Werft Kiel 463 - floatplane trainer

== KW (Wilhelmshaven) ==
(Kaiserliche Werft Wilhelmshaven - German Navy Shipyard)

- Kaiserliche Werft Wilhelmshaven 401 - floatplane trainer
- Kaiserliche Werft Wilhelmshaven 461 - floatplane trainer
- Kaiserliche Werft Wilhelmshaven 945 - floatplane fighter
- Kaiserliche Werft Wilhelmshaven 947 - reconnaissance floatplane

== Laufer ==
- Laufer VE-RO - jet helicopter project

== LFG Roland ==
(Luft-Fahrzeug-Gesellschaft)

- LFG Roland C.II - reconnaissance
- LFG Roland C.III - reconnaissance
- LFG Roland C.V - reconnaissance
- LFG Roland C.VIII - reconnaissance
- LFG Roland D.I - fighter
- LFG Roland D.II & IIa - fighter
- LFG Roland D.III - fighter
- LFG Roland D.IV - triplane fighter
- LFG Roland D.V - fighter
- LFG Roland D.VI - fighter
- LFG Roland D.VII - fighter
- LFG Roland D.VIII - fighter
- LFG Roland D.IX - fighter
- LFG Roland D.XIII - fighter
- LFG Roland D.XIV - fighter
- LFG Roland D.XV - fighter
- LFG Roland D.XVI - fighter
- LFG Roland D.XVII - monoplane fighter
- LFG Roland G.I - single engine heavy bomber
- LFG Roland W - reconnaissance floatplane
- LFG Roland WD - floatplane fighter
- LFG V 19 Straslund - submarine aircraft

== Linke-Hofmann ==
(Linke-Hofmann)

- Linke-Hofmann R.I - heavy bomber
- Linke-Hofmann R.II - heavy bomber

== Lippisch ==
(Alexander Lippisch)

- Lp DM-1 - delta-wing glider prototype
- Lp P.XIIIb - ramjet fighter project
- Lp GB 3/L - glide bomb

== LTG ==
(Lufttorpedo-Gesellschaft Berlin)

- LTG FD 1 - fighter floatplane

== Lübeck-Travemünde ==
(Flugzeugwerft Lübeck-Travemünde GmbH)

- Lübeck-Travemünde F.1 - floatplane reconnaissance
- Lübeck-Travemünde F.2 - floatplane reconnaissance
- Lübeck-Travemünde F.4 - floatplane reconnaissance
- Lübeck-Travemünde 844 - single-seat seaplane

== LVG ==
(Luftverkehrsgesellschaft mbH)

- LVG B.I - reconnaissance/trainer
- LVG B.II - reconnaissance/trainer
- LVG B.III - trainer aircraft
- LVG C.I - reconnaissance, one example modified as torpedo bomber
- LVG C.II - reconnaissance
- LVG C.III - reconnaissance
- LVG C.IV - reconnaissance
- LVG C.V - reconnaissance
- LVG C.VI - reconnaissance
- LVG C.VII - reconnaissance
- LVG C.VIII - reconnaissance
- LVG C.IX - reconnaissance
- LVG D 10 - experimental fighter
- LVG D.II - fighter
- LVG D.III - fighter
- LVG D.IV - fighter
- LVG D.V - fighter
- LVG D.VI - fighter
- LVG E.I - armed reconnaissance monoplane, 1915
- LVG G.I - bomber aircraft
- LVG G.II - triplane bomber
- LVG G.III - Schütte-Lanz G.V triplane bomber built by LVG

== Märkische ==
(Märkische Flugzeueg-Werke)

- Märkische D.I - fighter

== Messerschmitt ==
(Messerschmitt Aktiengesellschaft)

- Messerschmitt Bf 108 Taifun - trainer/liaison
- Messerschmitt Bf 109 - fighter (also Me 109)
- Messerschmitt Bf 109Z Zwilling - two Me Bf 109Fs joined, prototype in 1943 but cancelled after damaged by bombs.
- Messerschmitt Bf 110 - heavy fighter/night-fighter
- Messerschmitt Bf 161 - reconnaissance prototypes, 1937
- Messerschmitt Bf 162 Jaguar - bomber prototype
- Messerschmitt Bf 163 STOL reconnaissance prototype, built by Weserflu
- Messerschmitt Me 163 Komet - rocket interceptor
- Messerschmitt Me 209 - speed-record aircraft
- Messerschmitt Me 209-II - fighter prototype unrelated to first Me 209
- Messerschmitt Me 210 - heavy fighter/reconnaissance
- Messerschmitt Me 261 Adolfine -long-range reconnaissance
- Messerschmitt Me 262 Schwalbe - jet fighter/bomber
- Messerschmitt Me 263 - rocket interceptor
- Messerschmitt Me 264 Amerika - long-range bomber prototype
- Messerschmitt Me 265 attack aircraft project
- Messerschmitt Me 271bz Blitz Zerstorer - ramjet fighter project
- Messerschmitt Me 290 - maritime patrol/bomber
- Messerschmitt Me 309 - fighter prototype
- Messerschmitt Me 321 Gigant - transport glider
- Messerschmitt Me 323 Gigant - powered transport
- Messerschmitt Me 328 - pulsejet parasite fighter
- Messerschmitt Me 329 - heavy fighter project
- Messerschmitt Me 362 - project 3 jet military airliner
- Messerschmitt Me 410 Hornisse - heavy fighter/reconnaissance
- Messerschmitt Me 509 - fighter project, improved Me-309
- Messerschmitt Me 565 Vulkan - jet torpedo bomber project
- Messerschmitt Me 600 Bussard - provisional designation for development of Sack A.S.7
- Messerschmitt Me 609 Nacht Wulf - heavy fighter/bomber project
- Messerschmitt Me P.1101 - jet interceptor prototype w/variable sweep wing- basis for Bell X-5
- Messerschmitt Me P.1112 - jet fighter project, mock-up under construction in 1945

== Mistel Composites ==
- DFS 230 and Klemm Kl 35 - test combination
- DFS 230 and Focke-Wulf Fw 56 - test combination
- DFS 230 and Messerschmitt Bf 109F - test combo, first Mistel combination
- Mistel 1 - warhead nosed Junkers Ju 88A-4 and Messerschmitt Bf 109F
- Mistel S-1 - trainer version of Mistel 1
- Mistel 2 - warhead nosed Junkers Ju 88G-1 and Focke-Wulf Fw 190A-8 or F-8
- Mistel S-2 - trainer version of Mistel 2
- Mistel 3 - warhead nosed Junkers Ju 88G and Focke-Wulf Fw 190A
- Mistel S-3A - trainer version of Mistel 3A
- Mistel Fuhrungsmaschine - long-range reconnaissance project with manned Ju 88H-4 with radar and Fw 190A-8 escort
- Gigant Mistel - Messerschmitt Me 323 and Messerschmitt Me 328 project

== Nagler and Rolz ==
- Nagler and Rolz NR 54 - portable helicopter
- Nagler and Rolz NR 55 - portable helicopter

== Naglo ==
(Naglo Bootswerfte)

- Naglo D.II - quadruplane fighter

== NFW ==
(National Flugzeug-Werk GmbH Johannisthal)

- NFW B.I - trainer
- NFW E.I - experimental monoplane
- NFW E.II - experimental monoplane, 1917

== Oertz ==
(Oertz)

- Oertz W 4 - flying boat
- Oertz W 5 - flying boat
- Oertz W 6 Flugschoner - tandem double biplane flying boat
- Oerta W 7 - flying boat
- Oertz W 8 - flying boat

== Otto ==
(Gustav Otto Flugmaschinenfabrik & Otto Werke, Gustav Otto, München)

- Otto pusher - reconnaissance pusher biplane, 1914
- Otto B.I - reconnaissance tractor biplane, 1914
- Otto C.I - reconnaissance pusher, 1915
- Otto C.II - reconnaissance tractor biplane

== Pfalz ==
(Pfalz Flugzeugwerke)

- Pfalz A.I - reconnaissance monoplane, licence built Morane-Saulnier L
- Pfalz A.II - reconnaissance monoplane
- Pfalz C.I - Rumpler C.IV under licence with minor improvements
- Pfalz E.I - monoplane fighter
- Pfalz E.II - monoplane fighter
- Pfalz E.III - monoplane fighter
- Pfalz E.IV - monoplane fighter
- Pfalz E.V - monoplane fighter
- Pfalz D type - fighter biplane
- Pfalz D.III & IIIa - fighter
- Pfalz D.IV - fighter
- Pfalz D.VI - fighter
- Pfalz D.VII - fighter
- Pfalz D.VIII - fighter
- Pfalz D.XII - fighter
- Pfalz D.XIV - fighter
- Pfalz D.XV - fighter
- Pfalz Dr.I - triplane fighter
- Pfalz Dr.II - triplane fighter

== Reiseler, Walter ==
- Reiseler R-1 - helicopter
- Reiseler R-2 - helicopter

== Rex ==
(Flugmaschine Rex GmbH)

- Rex 1915 Scout - fighter, 1915
- Rex 1916 Scout - fighter, 1916
- Rex 1917 Scout - fighter, 1917

== Rohrbach, Adolph ==
- Rohrbach Cyclogyro - 1933 paddle-wing project

== Rohrbach ==
(Rohrbach Metall-Flugzeugbau)

- Rohrbach Ro IV Inverness - patrol seaplane
- Rohrbach Ro IX Rofix - fighter
- Rohrbach Roterra - trimotor medium bomber, 1930, rejected by Reichswehr licensed to Czechoslovakia as Avia 46

== Ruhrstahl ==
- Ruhrstahl X-4 - air-to-air missile (rocket-powered)

== Rumpler ==
(Rumpler Flugzeugwerke)

- Rumpler Taube - reconnaissance monoplane
- Rumpler 4A/B.I - reconnaissance
- Rumpler 4E - flying boat, 1914
- Rumpler 4A 15 - bomber, 1915
- Rumpler 5A/C.I & Ia - reconnaissance
- Rumpler 5A 15/G.I - bomber, 1915
- Rumpler 5A 16/G.II - bomber
- Rumpler 6A/C.III - reconnaissance
- Rumpler 6B - fighter floatplane
- Rumpler 6G 2/G.III - bomber
- Rumpler 7C/C.IX - reconnaissance
- Rumpler 7D - experimental fighters
- Rumpler 8C/C.X - reconnaissance
- Rumpler 8D/D.I - fighter
- Rumpler C.IV - reconnaissance
- Rumpler C.V - reconnaissance
- Rumpler C.VI - reconnaissance
- Rumpler C.VII - reconnaissance
- Rumpler C.VIII - reconnaissance

== Sablatnig ==
(Sablatnig Flugzeugbau GmbH)

- Sablatnig SF-1 - two-seat floatplane
- Sablatnig SF-2 - reconnaissance/trainer floatplane
- Sablatnig SF-3 - floatplane fighter
- Sablatnig SF-4 - floatplane triplane fighter
- Sablatnig SF-5 - reconnaissance floatplane
- Sablatnig SF-6/B.I - trainer
- Sablatnig SF-7 - floatplane fighter
- Sablatnig SF-8 - floatplane trainer
- Sablatnig C.I - reconnaissance
- Sablatnig C.II - reconnaissance
- Sablatnig C.III - reconnaissance
- Sablatnig N.I - night bomber

== Sack, Arthur ==
- Arthur Sack A.S.6 Bierdeckel - 1944 disk winged prototype

== Sanger-Bredt ==
- Sanger Antipodal Bomber Silbervogel - jet bomber project, mock-up built

== Schneider ==
(Flugmaschine Fabrik Franz Schneider GmbH)

- Schneider fighter 1918 - fighter

== Schütte-Lanz ==
(Luftfahrzeugbau Schütte-Lanz)

- Schütte-Lanz C.I - reconnaissance pusher
- Schütte-Lanz D.I - fighter, possibly a copy of the Sopwith Tabloid
- Schütte-Lanz D.II - fighter prototype, re-engined D.I with Mercedes inline, 1915.
- Schütte-Lanz D.III - fighter
- Schütte-Lanz D.IV - fighter biplane
- Schütte-Lanz D.VI - monoplane fighter with lifting struts
- Schütte-Lanz D.VII - fighter biplane
- Schütte-Lanz Dr.I - triplane fighter
- Schütte-Lanz G.I - large fighting aircraft
- Schütte-Lanz R.I - heavy bomber project

== Schwade ==
(Schwade Flugzeug und Motorenbau GmbH)

- Schwade 1914 Single-seater - pusher fighter biplane
- Schwade 1915 Single-seater - pusher biplane

== Siebel ==
(Siebel Flugzeugwerke)

- Siebel Fh 104 Hallore - medium transport
- Siebel Si 201 - STOL reconnaissance aircraft prototype
- Siebel Si 202 Hummel - sportplane/trainer, 1938
- Siebel Si 204 - transport/crew trainer

== SSW ==
(Siemens-Schuckertwerke)

- Siemens-Schuckert Bulldogge - single-seat monoplane, 1915
- Siemens-Schuckert B type - reconnaissance
- Siemens-Schuckert DD 5 - fighter biplane
- Siemens-Schuckert D.I & Ia - fighter
- Siemens-Schuckert D.IIe - fighter
- Siemens-Schuckert D.III - fighter
- Siemens-Schuckert D.IV - fighter
- Siemens-Schuckert D.V - fighter
- Siemens-Schuckert D.VI - fighter
- Siemens-Schuckert Dr.II - fighter
- Siemens-Schuckert DDr.I - fighter
- Siemens-Schuckert E.I - fighter
- Siemens-Schuckert E.II - fighter
- Siemens-Schuckert L.I - heavy bomber, originally to have been G.III
- Siemens-Schuckert R.I - heavy bomber
- Siemens-Schuckert R.II - heavy bomber
- Siemens-Schuckert R.III - heavy bomber
- Siemens-Schuckert R.IV - heavy bomber
- Siemens-Schuckert R.V - heavy bomber
- Siemens-Schuckert R.VI - heavy bomber
- Siemens-Schuckert R.VII - heavy bomber
- Siemens-Schuckert R.VIII - heavy bomber
- Siemens-Schuckert Forssman - heavy bomber
- Siemens-Schuckert Torpedoglieter - series of radio control glide bombs

== Škoda-Kauba (Occupied Czechoslovakia) ==
(Škoda-Kauba Flugzeugbau)

- Škoda-Kauba Sk V-5
- Škoda-Kauba Sk 257
- Skoda-Kauba Sk P.14 - ramjet fighter project

== Soldenhoff ==
- Soldenhoff A.2
- Soldenhoff S 5 - experimental swept flying wing, 1936

== Sombold, Heinz ==
- Sombold So 344 Rammschußjäger - rocket-powered interceptor project, 1944

== Stöckel ==
- Stöckel Rammschussjäger - ramjet-powered interceptor project, 1944

== Udet ==
(Udet Flugzeugbau)

- Udet U 12 Flamingo - trainer

== Ursinus ==
(Oskar Ursinus)

- Ursinus Seaplane - fighter floatplane with retractable floats

== VFW ==
(Vereinigte Flugtechnische Werke)

- VFW VAK 191B - VTOL fighter/ground attack

== VFW-Fokker ==
(VFW-Fokker GmbH)

- VFW-Fokker 614 - STOL transport

== Wernher von Braun ==
(Wernher von Braun)

- Von Braun Interceptor rocket VTO interceptor project, 1939

== Weserflug ==
(Weser Flugzeugbau GmbH)

- Weser We 271 - amphibian aircraft, prototype, 1939
- Weser P.1003 - tilt-rotor aircraft project
- Weser P.2127 - twin-boom aircraft project
- Weser P.2138 - large flying boat project

== WNF ==
(Wiener Neustadter Flugzeugwerk)

- WNF-4
- WNF Wn 11
- WNF Wn 15
- WNF Wn 16
- WNF-342

== Zeppelin Werke ==
(Zeppelin-Werke GmbH)

- Zeppelin-Lindau (Dornier) Rs.I - giant patrol seaplane
- Zeppelin-Lindau (Dornier) Rs.II - giant patrol seaplane
- Zeppelin-Lindau (Dornier) Rs.III - giant patrol seaplane
- Zeppelin-Lindau (Dornier) Rs.IV - giant patrol seaplane
- Zeppelin-Lindau (Dornier) D.I - fighter
- Zeppelin-Lindau (Dornier) C.I - two-seat military aircraft
- Zeppelin-Lindau (Dornier) C.II - two-seat military aircraft
- Zeppelin-Lindau (Dornier) CS.I - two-seat floatplane
- Zeppelin-Lindau (Dornier) CL.II - two seat close support/ground attack aircraft
- Zeppelin-Lindau (Dornier) V1 - experimental pusher to test stressed skin structure
- Zeppelin (Ja) C.I - reconnaissance, unrelated to previous C.I
- Zeppelin (Ja) C.II -reconnaissance, unrelated to previous C.II
- Zeppelin-Staaken V.G.O.I - heavy bomber
- Zeppelin-Staaken V.G.O.II - heavy bomber
- Zeppelin-Staaken V.G.O.III - heavy bomber
- Zeppelin-Staaken R.IV - heavy bomber
- Zeppelin-Staaken R.V - heavy bomber
- Zeppelin-Staaken R.VI & Type L seaplane - heavy bomber/patrol bomber
- Zeppelin-Staaken R.VII - heavy bomber
- Zeppelin-Staaken 8301 - heavy floatplane bomber
- Zeppelin-Staaken R.XIV - heavy bomber
- Zeppelin-Staaken R.XV - heavy bomber
- Zeppelin-Staaken R.XVI - heavy bomber
- Zeppelin-Staaken E-4/20 - heavy bomber/transport
- Zeppelin Fliegende Panzerfaust (Flying Armored Fist) aircraft project
- Zeppelin Rammer ramming aircraft project

== See also ==
- List of aircraft of the French Air Force during World War II
- List of aircraft of the Luftwaffe, World War II
- List of World War II Luftwaffe aircraft engines
- Idflieg aircraft designation system (World War I aircraft)
- List of RLM aircraft designations (3rd Reich aircraft only)
- List of Sailplanes
- List of Luftwaffe aircraft by manufacturer, World War II
