= Friedrichshafen D.I =

German WWI fighter aircraft

D.I
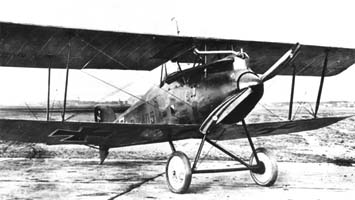
- Postcard of the first prototype of the Friedrichshafen D.I circa 1917

General information
- Type: Fighter
- Manufacturer: Flugzeugbau Friedrichshafen
- Status: Prototype only
- Primary user: Luftstreitkräfte
- Number built: 2

History
- First flight: 1917
- Developed from: Friedrichshafen FF.43

The Friedrichshafen D.I (company designation Friedrichshafen FF.46) was a German single-seat fighter plane developed by the Flugzeugbau Friedrichshafen during the First World War. Two prototypes were flown in 1917, but it was judged inferior to the Albatros D.III then in production and was not manufactured.

== Background and description ==
The Flugzeugbau Friedrichshafen aircraft manufacturing company, after having failed to sell the FF.43 fighter floatplane to the Imperial German Navy's (Kaiserliche Marine) Naval Air Service (Marine-Fliegerabteilung) in 1916, modified its design for land service in an attempt to sell it to the German Army's (Deutsches Heer) Inspectorate of Flying Troops (Inspektion der Fliegertruppen) (Idflieg). The Army accepted Friedrichshafen's proposal in September and ordered three prototypes, only two of which are known to have been completed.

Although the D.I was developed from the FF.43, they did not share any components. The D.I replaced the floats with a conventional landing gear arrangement, but retained its predecessor's single-bay, staggered-wing design, 160 hp (120 kW) Mercedes D.III straight-six engine and its pair of synchronised 7.92 mm (0.312 in) LMG 08/15 Spandau machine guns. The two prototypes known to have been built differed only in the cabanes securing the upper wing to the fuselage; the first aircraft had vertical cabanes while the second had ones that were angled outwards for better pilot visibility.

The two prototypes were tested by Idflieg until 28 April 1917, revealing that their flight characteristics and performance were inferior to the Albatross D.III, so the D.I project was abandoned. Idflieg did not retain performance data for aircraft that it did not accept.

== Specifications ==
Data from The Complete Book of Fighters: An Illustrated Encyclopedia of Every Fighter Built and Flown

General characteristics

- Crew: 1
- Length: 7.1 m (23 ft 4 in)
- Wingspan: 9 m (29 ft 6 in)
- Height: 2.7 m (8 ft 10 in)
- Wing area: 25.8 m^{2} (278 sq ft)
- Empty weight: 686 kg (1,512 lb)
- Gross weight: 901 kg (1,986 lb)
- Powerplant: 1 × Mercedes D.III water-cooled, straight-six piston engine, 120 kW (160 hp)
- Propellers: 2-bladed

Performance Armament

- Guns: 2 × fixed, forward-firing 7.92 mm (0.312 in) LMG 08/15 machine guns

== See also ==
Related lists

- List of military aircraft of Germany

== Bibliography ==
- Green, William & Swanborough, Gordon (2001) [1994]. The Complete Book of Fighters: An Illustrated Encyclopedia of Every Fighter Built and Flown (Revised and Updated ed.). London: Salamander Books. ISBN 1-84065-269-1.
- Herris, Jack (2016). Friedrichshafen Aircraft of WWI: A Centennial Perspective on Great War Airplanes. Great War Aviation Centennial Series. Vol. 21. n.p.: Aeronaut Books. ISBN 978-1-935881-35-3.
