= Karl Gehlen =

German engineer

Karl Gehlen was the chief designer of the German Flugzeugbau Friedrichshafen GmbH company, formed on June 17, 1912 by Diplom Ingenieur Theodor Kober, a working associate of Graf Ferdinand von Zeppelin.
