= Friedrichshafen FF.71 =

German civilian biplane

FF.71
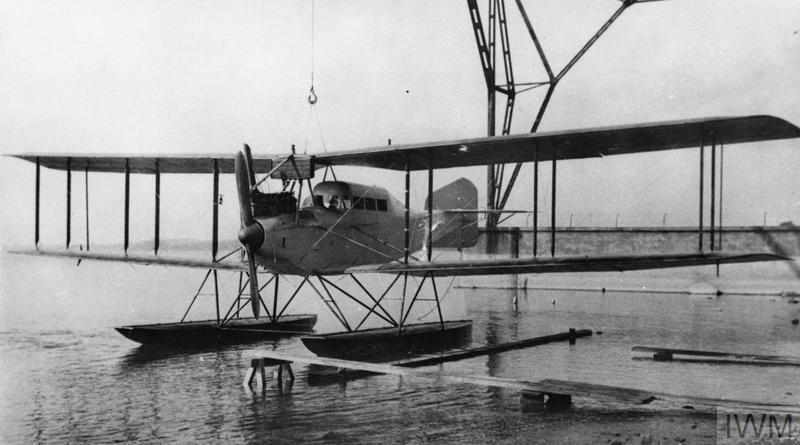
- Front view of the FF.71 prototype after it had been modified with a passenger cabin

General information
- Type: floatplane airliner
- National origin: Germany
- Manufacturer: Flugzeugbau Friedrichshafen / LFG
- Number built: 4 known, perhaps 2 more

History
- First flight: April 1919
- Developed from: Friedrichshafen FF.49C

The Friedrichshafen FF.71 was a German biplane floatplane designed by the Friedrichshafen Aircraft Construction Company (Flugzeugbau Friedrichshafen) after the end of the First World War in November 1918. It was derived from the two-seat wartime FF.49C reconnaissance aircraft and modified to accommodate passengers. Friedrichshafen is known to have built one prototype; production of five FF.71a production aircraft is attributed to Luft-Fahrzeug-Gesellschaft (LFG). Three of these appear on the German civil aircraft register in the early 1920s. Surviving documentation is sparse and little is known about the aircraft and their activities.

== Development and description ==
The FF.71 was a conventional design with equal-span three-bay wings. The undercarriage consisted of two widely spaced floats that were attached to the fuselage by multiple V-struts. The water-cooled 200-metric-horsepower (147 kW) Benz Bz.IV straight-six engine was positioned at the front of the fuselage driving a two-bladed propeller. The radiator was positioned at the front of the upper wing, above the engine. The aircraft was fitted with the pilot's cockpit in front and accommodation for an unknown number of passengers behind him. Initially the passengers and the pilot sat in the open, but the passengers were later protected by an enclosed cabin, leaving the pilot exposed.

The FF.71 made its first flight in either April or May 1919. LFG had built FF.49Cs under license from Friedrichshafen during the war and reportedly built the five FF.71a's in 1921. Three of these are noted on the civil aircraft register before 1922 as being flown by Lloyd Luftverkehr Sablatnig, a small airline controlled by Sablatnig.

== Specifications (FF.71a) ==
Data from Flugzeugbau Friedrichshafen GmbH: Diplom-Ingenieur Theodor Kober

General characteristics

- Crew: 1
- Capacity: up to 3 pax
- Length: 11.65 m (38 ft 3 in)
- Wingspan: 17.15 m (56 ft 3 in)
- Height: 4.25 m (13 ft 11 in)
- Wing area: 71.16 m^{2} (766.0 sq ft)
- Powerplant: 1 × Benz Bz.IV water-cooled straight-six engine, 150 kW (200 hp)
- Propellers: 2-bladed wooden fixed-pitch

Performance

- Maximum speed: 140 km/h (87 mph, 76 kn)
- Cruise speed: 130 km/h (81 mph, 70 kn)

== See also ==
Related lists

- List of military aircraft of Germany
- List of flying boats and floatplanes

== Bibliography ==
- Andersson, Lennart & Sanger, Ray (2014). Retribution and Recovery: German Aircraft and Aviation 1919 to 1922. Staplefield, UK: Air-Britain (Historians). ISBN 978-0-85130-467-0.
- Borzutzki, Siegfried (1993). Flugzeugbau Friedrichshafen GmbH: Diplom-Ingenieur Theodor Kober [Friedrichshafen Aircraft Company: Diploma-Engineer Theodore Kober] (in German). Berlin: Burbach. ISBN 3-927513-60-1.
- Herris, Jack (2016). Friedrichshafen Aircraft of WWI: A Centennial Perspective on Great War Airplanes. Great War Aviation Centennial Series. Vol. 21. n.p.: Aeronaut Books. ISBN 978-1-935881-35-3.
