= Friedrichshafen FF.2 =

FF.2

General information
- Type: Floatplane
- National origin: Germany
- Manufacturer: Flugzeugbau Friedrichshafen
- Number built: 1

History
- First flight: 1913

The Friedrichshafen FF.2 was a floatplane built in Germany in 1913. It was derived from a design by the Swiss pilot and designer René Grandjean. Only one aircraft was built before the design was reworked into the Friedrichshafen FF.4 the following year.

== Background and description ==
Grandjean licensed the design for one of his aircraft to Flugzeugbau Friedrichshafen which modified it as the FF.2. One aircraft was commissioned for a customer and it first flew sometime in 1913. Its ultimate fate is unknown.

The FF.2 was a single-seat monoplane with a pair of large floats attached to the forward fuselage with struts and a small one under the tail structure. It was powered by a 50-metric-horsepower (37 kW) Oerlikon four-cylinder flat engine in a tractor configuration at the front of the fuselage. The engine was cooled by radiators positioned on the sides of the fuselage.

== Specifications (FF.2) ==
Data from Flugzeugbau Friedrichshafen GmbH: Diplom-Ingenieur Theodor Kober

General characteristics

- Crew: 1
- Length: 9.8 m (32 ft 2 in)
- Wingspan: 11 m (36 ft 1 in)
- Wing area: 20 m^{2} (220 sq ft)
- Gross weight: 972 kg (2,143 lb)
- Powerplant: 1 × Oerlikon 4-cylinder, water-cooled flat engine, 37 kW (50 hp)
- Propellers: 2-bladed

Performance

- Time to altitude: 560 m (1,840 ft) in 8 minutes

== Bibliography ==
- Borzutzki, Siegfried (1993). Flugzeugbau Friedrichshafen GmbH: Diplom-Ingenieur Theodor Kober [Friedrichshafen Aircraft Company: Diploma-Engineer Theodore Kober] (in German). Berlin: Burbach. ISBN 3-927513-60-1.
- Herris, Jack (2016). Friedrichshafen Aircraft of WWI: A Centennial Perspective on Great War Airplanes. Great War Aviation Centennial Series. Vol. 21. Charleston, South Carolina: Aeronaut Books. ISBN 978-1-935881-35-3.
- Vidal, Ricardo Miguel. "OERLIKON". www.aeroenginesaz.com.
