= Friedrichshafen FF.64 =

FF.64
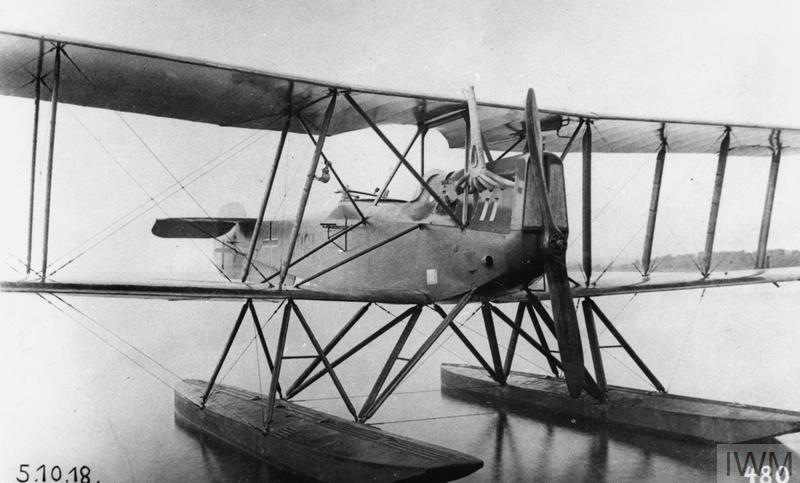
- Front oblique view of the FF.64

General information
- Type: Two-seat shipborne patrol floatplane
- Manufacturer: Flugzeugbau Friedrichshafen
- Number built: at least 1

History
- First flight: 5 May 1918

The Friedrichshafen FF.64 was a German prototype short-range maritime patrol floatplane developed during World War I by the Friedrichshafen Aircraft Company (Flugzeugbau Friedrichshafen) for the Imperial German Navy's (Kaiserliche Marine) Naval Air Service (Marine-Fliegerabteilung). It was designed with folding wings to facilitate its use aboard ships. Three aircraft were ordered in 1918, but only one is known to have been completed as the war ended in November.

== Development and design ==
The German commerce raider Wolf had been equipped with a Friedrichshafen FF.33e floatplane when she began her cruise on 30 November 1916. Her aircraft (nicknamed Wölfchen (Wolf Cub)) proved invaluable to the ship's success as it allowed Wolf to spot targets that the ship would otherwise have never seen and to avoid warships that might have spotted her. The Naval Air Service ordered three examples of an improved version of Wölfchen in March 1918 that Friedrichshafen designated the FF.64.

The aircraft was a two-seat biplane built in the company's usual way with wire-braced wood covered with doped fabric. The three-bay wings folded to the rear parallel to the fuselage to make the aircraft more compact for storage aboard ship. To further ease that task, the FF.64's floats could also be removed. The other issue that the sailors aboard the Wolf had to deal with was that the Wölfchen was not optimized to be swayed overboard and put onto the water to take off or recovered. The FF.64's structure was accordingly reinforced to make this process easier. The crew of the Wölfchen had a problem of their own in that dropping small bombs to intimidate ship's captains into surrendering did not always work, so the observer in the rear cockpit of the FF.64 was provided with a 7.92 mm (0.312 in) Parabellum MG14 machine gun. It was powered by a 170-metric-horsepower (168 bhp; 125 kW) Mercedes D.IIIa inline six piston engine.

Only one FF.64 is known to have been completed as photographic evidence shows that Friedrichshafen tested at least three different designs for the tail structure on the same aircraft. When the Allies inspected the German seaplane bases in December 1918, they recorded one FF.64 at Warnemünde. Its ultimate fate is unknown, but it was likely scrapped.

== Specifications (FF.64) ==
Data from Flugzeugbau Friedrichshafen GmbH

General characteristics

- Crew: 2
- Powerplant: 1 × Mercedes D.IIIR 6-cylinder water-cooled in-line piston engine, 130 kW (170 hp)

Armament

- Guns: 1× 7.92 mm (0.312 in) Parabellum MG14 machine gun on a flexible mount

== See also ==
Related lists

- List of military aircraft of Germany
- List of flying boats and floatplanes

== Bibliography ==
- Borzutzki, Siegfried (1993). Flugzeugbau Friedrichshafen GmbH: Diplom-Ingenieur Theodor Kober [Friedrichshafen Aircraft Company: Diploma-Engineer Theodore Kober] (in German). Berlin: Burbach. ISBN 3-927513-60-1.
- Gray, Peter & Thetford, Owen (1987) [1970]. German Aircraft of the First World War (2nd ed.). London: Putnam. ISBN 0-85177-809-7.
- Herris, Jack (2016). Friedrichshafen Aircraft of WWI: A Centennial Perspective on Great War Airplanes. Great War Aviation Centennial Series. Vol. 21. n.p.: Aeronaut Books. ISBN 978-1-935881-35-3.
- Noppen, Ryan (2015). German Commerce Raiders, 1914-18. Oxford: Osprey Publishing. ISBN 978-1-4728-0950-6.
- Nowarra, Heinz J.; Robertson, Bruce & Cooksley, Peter G. (1966). Marine Aircraft of the 1914–1918 War. Letchworth, UK: Harleyford Publications. OCLC 123198808.
