= Friedrichshafen FF.1 =

Seaplane of the 1910s built in Germany

- An oblique photograph of the FF.1

General information
- Type: Prototype
- National origin: German Empire
- Manufacturer: Flugzeugbau Friedrichshafen
- Number built: 1

History
- First flight: 2 November 1912
- Developed into: Friedrichshfen FF.9

The Friedrichshafen FF.1 was a German experimental floatplane built in 1912. It was the first aircraft designed and built by the newly established Flugzeugbau Friedrichshafen. Only one prototype was constructed and it set a German national record for endurance in 1913 before crashing in early 1914.

== Development and description ==
Flugzeugbau Friedrichshafen was founded after Theodor Kober had purchased a Curtiss A-2 floatplane to test the hydrodynamic performance of its central float in 1912. Dissatisfied with its performance in rough water, he designed the FF.1 with a float of his own design that he believed would have better performance. It first flew on 2 November although towed testing of various float shapes continued into January 1913.

The aircraft was a two-seat biplane with a 100 PS (74 kW) Argus As I straight-four engine in pusher configuration mounted at the rear of the fuselage. The engine's radiators were mounted on the sides of the fuselage. The span of the upper and lower wings was initially 14 m (45 ft 11 in) and 10 m (32 ft 10 in) respectively, but these were later extended to 16.8 m (55 ft 1 in) and 14 meters respectively. The ailerons were fitted between the wings. A pair of wheels could be attached to the airplane to allow it to maneuver on the ground.

== History ==
During one flight in bad weather, the engine failed and the FF.1 was forced to land on Lake Constance. Despite high waves and a heavy snowfall, the aircraft drifted for 2½ hours before it was recovered; it did not require any repairs to the airframe or floats afterwards. Piloted by the company's test pilot, Robert Gsell, on 14 February 1913, the FF.1 set a German national flight endurance record of 2 hours, 32 minutes, and 30 seconds. The floatplane was destroyed in a crash in February 1914.

== Specifications (variant specified) ==
Data from Friedrichshafen Aircraft of WWI: A Centennial Perspective on Great War Airplanes; Flugzeugbau Friedrichshafen GmbH: Diplom-Ingenieur Theodor Kober

General characteristics

- Crew: 2
- Length: 11.15 m (36 ft 7 in)
- Upper wingspan: 14 m (45 ft 11 in)
- Lower wingspan: 10 m (32 ft 10 in)
- Height: 3.35 m (11 ft 0 in)
- Wing area: 48 m^{2} (520 sq ft)
- Empty weight: 972 kg (2,143 lb)
- Gross weight: 1,672 kg (3,686 lb)
- Powerplant: 1 × Argus As I water-cooled straight-four engine, 75 kW (100 hp) Originally measured as 100 PS (74 kW).
- Propellers: 2-bladed pusher propeller

Performance

- Maximum speed: 85 km/h (53 mph, 46 kn)
- Time to altitude: 560 m (1,840 ft) in 8 minutes

== Bibliography ==
- Borzutzki, Siegfried (1993). Flugzeugbau Friedrichshafen GmbH: Diplom-Ingenieur Theodor Kober [Friedrichshafen Aircraft Company: Diploma-Engineer Theodore Kober] (in German). Berlin: Burbach. ISBN 3-927513-60-1.
- Herris, Jack (2016). Friedrichshafen Aircraft of WWI: A Centennial Perspective on Great War Airplanes. Great War Aviation Centennial Series. Vol. 21. Charleston, South Carolina: Aeronaut Books. ISBN 978-1-935881-35-3.
