= Friedrichshafen FF.40 =

FF.40
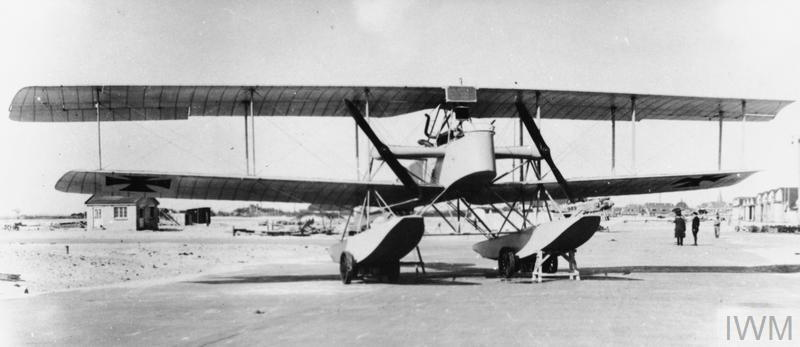
- A FF.40 with beaching gear underneath its floats

General information
- Type: Experimental floatplane
- Manufacturer: Flugzeugbau Friedrichshafen
- Number built: 1

History
- First flight: April 1916

The Friedrichshafen FF.40 was an experimental German two-seat floatplane developed during World War I by the Friedrichshafen Aircraft Company (Flugzeugbau Friedrichshafen) for the Imperial German Navy's (Kaiserliche Marine) Naval Air Service (Marine-Fliegerabteilung). One aircraft was ordered in 1916 and its ultimate fate is unknown.

== Development and design ==
The FF.40 was designed to evaluate the utility of using a single fuselage-mounted engine to power two propellers via separate driveshafts. The aircraft was otherwise unremarkable in configuration as a two-bay biplane and was built using the company's typical method of wire-braced wood with doped fabric covering. Multiple struts connected the two floats to the fuselage and the lower wing. The aircraft observer was located in the nose of the FF.40 and was armed with a 7.92-millimetre (0.312 in) Parabellum MG14 machine gun on a flexible mount. The pilot's cockpit was positioned at the trailing edge of the wings and the distance between the two positions greatly hampered their ability to communicate.

The FF.40 was powered by a 240-metric-horsepower (180 kW) Maybach Mb.IV straight-six piston engine in the fuselage. It drove two propellers mounted just forward of and between the wings on each side via driveshafts that protruded from the fuselage and connected to the propeller shafts using ZF bevel gears. The engine was cooled by two radiators hanging from the upper wing. The arrangement proved very heavy and limited the aircraft's payload to the machine gun and a wireless transmitter without a receiver.

Friedrichshafen received the order from the Naval Air Service in February 1916 and the FF.40 made its first flight two months later. It was turned over to the Seaplane Testing Command (Seeflugzeug-Versuchs-Kommando) for evaluation in either July or August. Its ultimate fate is unknown as it was not found when the Allies inspected the German seaplane bases in December 1918.

== Specifications (FF.40) ==
Data from Flugzeugbau Friedrichshafen GmbH

General characteristics

- Crew: 3
- Length: 12.43 m (40 ft 9 in)
- Upper wingspan: 21 m (68 ft 11 in)
- Lower wingspan: 19 m (62 ft 4 in)
- Height: 4.45 m (14 ft 7 in)
- Wing area: 88.9 m^{2} (957 sq ft)
- Empty weight: 1,879 kg (4,142 lb)
- Gross weight: 2,539 kg (5,598 lb)
- Powerplant: 1 × Maybach Mb.IV 6-cylinder water-cooled in-line piston engine, 180 kW (240 hp)
- Propellers: 2-bladed fixed-pitch tractor propeller driven by drive shafts and gearboxes

Performance

- Maximum speed: 125 km/h (78 mph, 67 kn)
- Range: 750 km (470 mi, 400 nmi)
- Time to altitude:

560 m (1,840 ft) in 8 minutes
800 m (2,600 ft) in 8 minutes
1,000 m (3,300 ft) in 10.5 minutes

Armament

- Guns: 1 × 7.92 mm (0.312 in) Parabellum MG14 machine gun for observer

== See also ==
Related lists

- List of military aircraft of Germany
- List of flying boats and floatplanes

== Bibliography ==
- Andersson, Lennart & Sanger, Ray (2014). Retribution and Recovery: German Aircraft and Aviation 1919 to 1922. Staplefield, UK: Air-Britain (Historians). ISBN 978-0-85130-467-0.
- Borzutzki, Siegfried (1993). Flugzeugbau Friedrichshafen GmbH: Diplom-Ingenieur Theodor Kober [Friedrichshafen Aircraft Company: Diploma-Engineer Theodore Kober] (in German). Berlin: Burbach. ISBN 3-927513-60-1.
- Herris, Jack (2016). Friedrichshafen Aircraft of WWI: A Centennial Perspective on Great War Airplanes. Great War Aviation Centennial Series. Vol. 21. n.p.: Aeronaut Books. ISBN 978-1-935881-35-3.
