= Friedrichshafen FF.63 =

FF.63
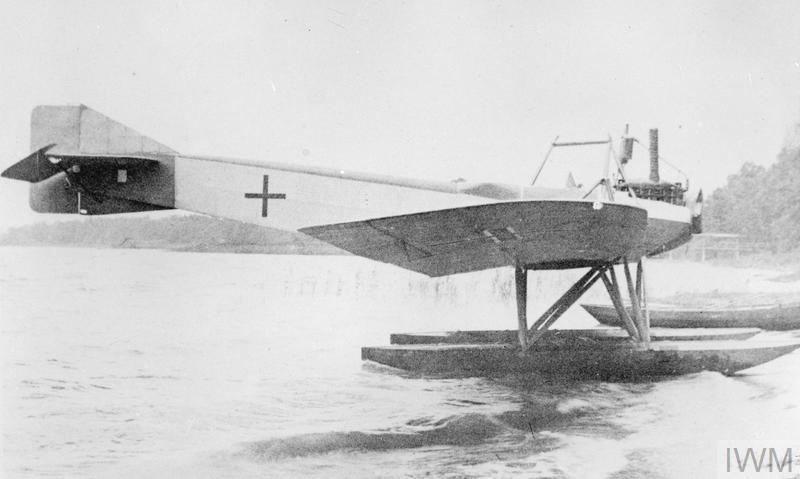
- A side view of a beached FF.63

General information
- Type: Prototype floatplane
- Manufacturer: Flugzeugbau Friedrichshafen
- Number built: 1

History
- First flight: 13 August 1918

The Friedrichshafen FF.63 was a German prototype floatplane fighter produced by Friedrichshafen Aircraft Construction Company (Flugzeugbau Friedrichshafen) in the last year of the First World War. The aircraft was developed as a competitor to the Hansa-Brandenburg W.29 floatplane fighter already in service with the Imperial German Navy's (Kaiserliche Marine) Naval Air Service (Marine-Fliegerabteilung) and was heavily influenced by its design. The aircraft was still conducting flight testing when the war ended in November 1918 and the program was cancelled.

== Development and description ==
The FF.63 copied the configuration of the W.29, but had to add a king post and wires above the pilot's cockpit and additional struts connecting the wings to the top of the fuselage for strength, both of which increased weight and drag over the Hansa-Brandenburg aircraft. The wooden fuselage was built in Friedrichshaften's usual way, but the tail section was made from fabric-covered steel tubing, an important innovation for the company. The pilot's cockpit was located in front of the observer's. The water-cooled 200-metric-horsepower (147 kW) Benz Bz.IV straight-six engine was positioned at the front of the fuselage driving a two-bladed propeller. Photographic evidence shows the radiator positioned above the rear of the engine, impeding the pilot's vision and creating more drag. Aviation historian Jack Herris believes that this was a temporary installation done to expedite early flight testing.

The aircraft made its first flight on 13 August 1918. Surviving documentation is sparse and nothing more is known about the aircraft and its activities.

== Development and design ==
The FF.63 was an experimental monoplane floatplane powered by one Benz Bz.IV. Its first flight took place in August 1918, only shortly before the Armistice that ended all further development. Only one was built.

== Specifications ==
Data from Flugzeugbau Friedrichshafen GmbH: Diplom-Ingenieur Theodor Kober

General characteristics

- Crew: 2
- Powerplant: 1 × Benz Bz.IV water-cooled straight-six engine, 150 kW (200 hp)
- Propellers: 2-bladed

Performance

- Maximum speed: 185 km/h (115 mph, 100 kn)
- Time to altitude: 560 m (1,840 ft) in 8 minutes

== See also ==
Related lists

- List of military aircraft of Germany
- List of flying boats and floatplanes

== Bibliography ==
- Borzutzki, Siegfried (1993). Flugzeugbau Friedrichshafen GmbH: Diplom-Ingenieur Theodor Kober [Friedrichshafen Aircraft Company: Diploma-Engineer Theodore Kober] (in German). Berlin: Burbach. ISBN 3-927513-60-1.
- Gray, Peter & Thetford, Owen (1987) [1970]. German Aircraft of the First World War (2nd ed.). London: Putnam. ISBN 0-85177-809-7.
- Herris, Jack (2016). Friedrichshafen Aircraft of WWI: A Centennial Perspective on Great War Airplanes. Great War Aviation Centennial Series. Vol. 21. n.p.: Aeronaut Books. ISBN 978-1-935881-35-3.
