= Friedrichshafen FF.54 =

German fighter prototype

FF.54
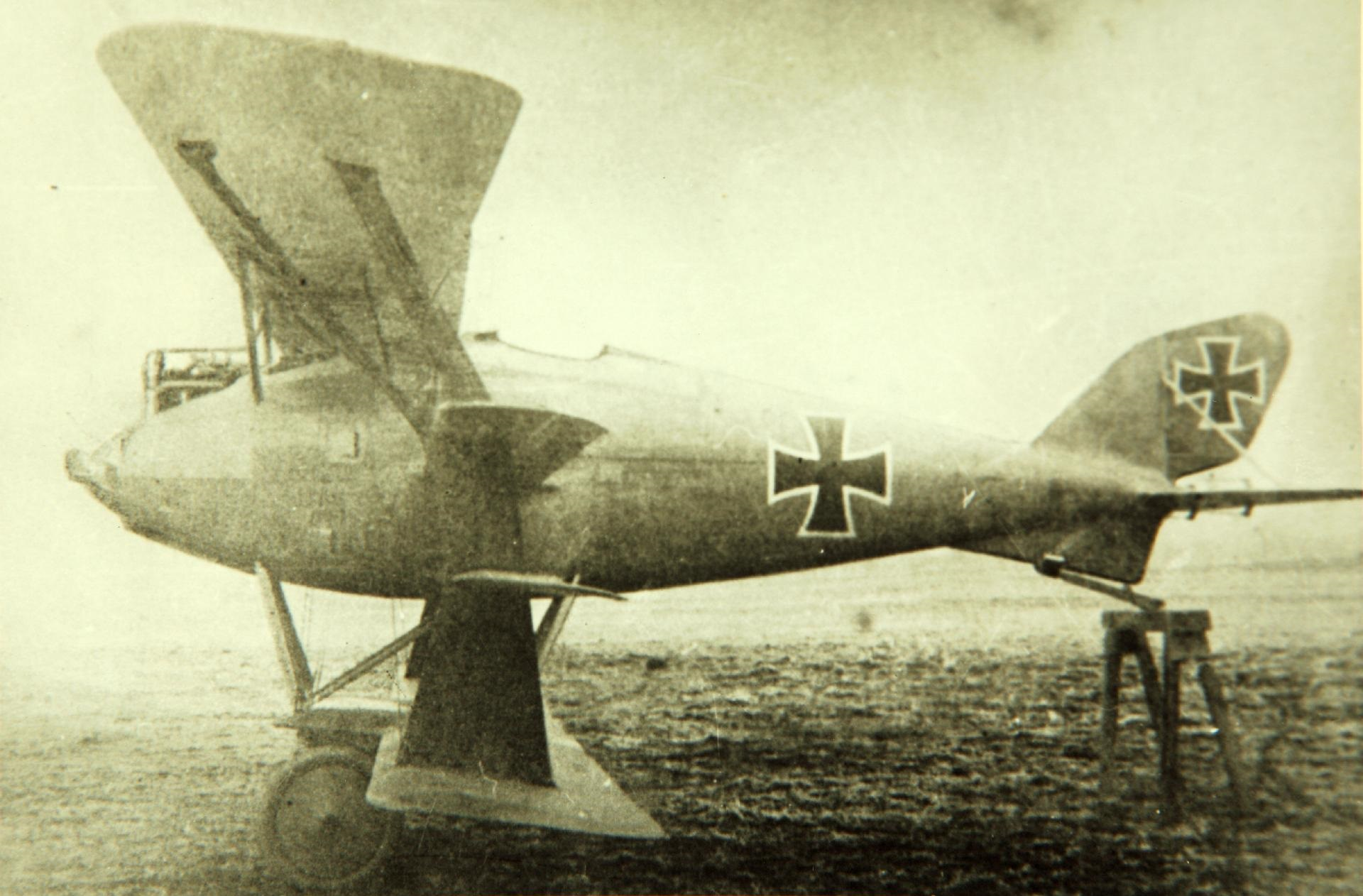

General information
- Type: Prototype quadruplane fighter
- National origin: Germany
- Manufacturer: Flugzeugbau Friedrichshafen

History
- First flight: late 1917

The Friedrichshafen FF.54 was a German experimental quadruplane that was developed by the Friedrichshafen Aircraft Construction Company (Flugzeugbau Friedrichshafen) during the First World War for the Imperial German Army's (Deutsches Heer) Imperial German Air Service (Luftstreitkräfte). The aircraft was not successful and one wing was removed to convert it to a triplane in 1918. Further development was cancelled after a crash later that year.

== Design and development ==
The success of the British Sopwith Triplane in early 1917 despite the overall dominance of the Albatros D.III biplanes caused the Imperial German Air Service's Inspectorate of Flying Troops (Inspektion der Fliegertruppen, or Idflieg) to believe that its triplane configuration was the key to its success. Idflieg did not understand that the extra weight and drag of the third wing limited its rate of climb at high altitude and speed at all altitudes and that the extra wing improved maneuverability and rate of climb at low altitude by reducing the wing loading; it was not a panacea. Idflieg therefore requested that each aircraft company to provide a triplane fighter in mid-1917.

Dipl.-Eng. van Gries at Friedrichshafen believed that if three wings were good, surely four were even better, and responded with the FF.54. The fighter had a streamlined, oval-sectioned fuselage that tapered towards the rear with a water-cooled, 170-metric-horsepower (125 kW) Mercedes D.IIIa straight-six engine in the nose driving a two-bladed propeller. The pilot's cockpit was located just aft of the trailing edge of the upper wing. That wing was significantly staggered forward of the other wings and incorporated the engine's radiator. It was attached to the fuselage by ordinary cabane struts. The middle two narrow-chord wings were attached to the fuselage with a narrow gap between that increased drag from airflow interference between them. The supports for the conventional landing gear were reinforced with additional struts for the bottom wing below the fuselage. The broad, streamlined interplane struts between lower three wings were roughly triangular in shape; the struts between the upper two wings also had an airfoil section, but were V-shaped. The horizontal stabilizer was supported by struts that attached to the vertical stabilizer. The armament was intended to consist of two fixed, forward-firing 7.92-millimeter (0.312 in) LMG 08/15 machine guns.

The FF.54 was still under construction on 31 October 1917, but was expected to be completed in three to four weeks. It is not known when the prototype made its first flight. Flight testing proved that the quadraplane configuration resulted in poor performance and it was rebuilt in April 1918 as a triplane with the lower-middle wing removed and the vertical stabilizer and rudder reconfigured. The horizontal stabilizer also was reinforced with struts connecting it to the bottom of the fuselage. The FF.54 was flown the following month with flight testing continuing until it crashed in September. The project was then cancelled.

== Specifications ==
Data from Flugzeugbau Friedrichshafen GmbH: Diplom-Ingenieur Theodor Kober; The Complete Book of Fighters: An Illustrated Encyclopedia of Every Fighter Built and Flown

General characteristics

- Crew: 1
- Powerplant: 1 × Mercedes D.IIIa water-cooled straight-six engine, 130 kW (170 hp)
- Propellers: 2-bladed fixed-pitch

Armament

- Guns: 2 x fixed, forward-firing 7.92 mm (0.312 in) LMG 08/15 machineguns

== Bibliography ==
- Borzutzki, Siegfried (1993). Flugzeugbau Friedrichshafen GmbH: Diplom-Ingenieur Theodor Kober [Friedrichshafen Aircraft Company: Diploma-Engineer Theodore Kober] (in German). Berlin: Burbach. ISBN 3-927513-60-1.
- Green, William & Swanborough, Gordon (2001) [1994]. The Complete Book of Fighters: An Illustrated Encyclopedia of Every Fighter Built and Flown (Revised and Updated ed.). London: Salamander Books. ISBN 1-84065-269-1.
- Herris, Jack (2016). Friedrichshafen Aircraft of WWI: A Centennial Perspective on Great War Airplanes. Great War Aviation Centennial Series. Vol. 21. Charleston, South Carolina: Aeronaut Books. ISBN 978-1-935881-35-3.
- Herris, Jack (2013). Germany's Triplane Craze: A Centennial Perspective on Great War Airplanes. Great War Aviation Centennial Series. Vol. 7. Aeronaut Books. ISBN 978-1-935881-15-5.
