= A/S Aero =

Norwegian airline, 1920

A/S Aero was a Norwegian airline company founded by Tancred Ibsen in January 1920. The company was financed by Tancred Ibsen's uncle, businessman Einar Bjørnson, and two shipowners. Despite the A/S (for private company limited by shares) in its name, A/S Aero was never formally registered as a limited company.

The company purchased one Hansa Brandenburg W.29 and four Friedrichshafen FF.49 aircraft from Germany in February. This deal was probably illegal as the Entente prohibited the export of German surplus aircraft, but Ibsen nevertheless got permission from the Norwegian Ministry of Defence to import the five German aircraft.

During the summer of 1920 A/S Aero successly operated demonstration, advertising, and limited mail flights from the Bestumkilen bay in Oslo, with Tancred Ibsen as the head pilot. The company also chartered out airplanes to serve the Det Norske Luftfartrederi routes in southern Norway.

Tancred Ibsen soon got tired of his career as a pilot, and the activity of A/S Aero ended, with the company becoming part of the aircraft factory in Tønsberg, A/S Norske Aeroplanfabrik.
