= Friedrichshafen FF.67 =

FF.67

General information
- Type: Experimental floatplane
- Manufacturer: Flugzeugbau Friedrichshafen
- Number built: 1

History
- First flight: 12 December 1918

The Friedrichshafen FF.67 was a German experimental floatplane produced by Flugzeugbau Friedrichshafen.

== Development and design ==
The FF.67 was an experimental monoplane floatplane powered by one Mercedes D.IV. Its first flight took place in December 1918, a month after the Armistice.

== Specifications ==
Data from Friedrichshafen Aircraft of WWI: A Centennial Perspective on Great War Airplanes

General characteristics

- Crew: 2
- Powerplant: 1 × Mercedes D.IVa six-cylinder, water-cooled, inline engine, 190 kW (260 hp)
- Propellers: 2-bladed fixed-pitch propeller

Performance

== See also ==
Related lists

- List of military aircraft of Germany
- List of flying boats and floatplanes

== Bibliography ==
- Borzutzki, Siegfried (1993). Flugzeugbau Friedrichshafen GmbH: Diplom-Ingenieur Theodor Kober [Friedrichshafen Aircraft Company: Diploma-Engineer Theodore Kober] (in German). Berlin: Burbach. ISBN 3-927513-60-1.
- Herris, Jack (2016). Friedrichshafen Aircraft of WWI: A Centennial Perspective on Great War Airplanes. Great War Aviation Centennial Series. Vol. 21. n.p.: Aeronaut Books. ISBN 978-1-935881-35-3.
