= Fokker V.9 =

Experimental aircraft

V.9
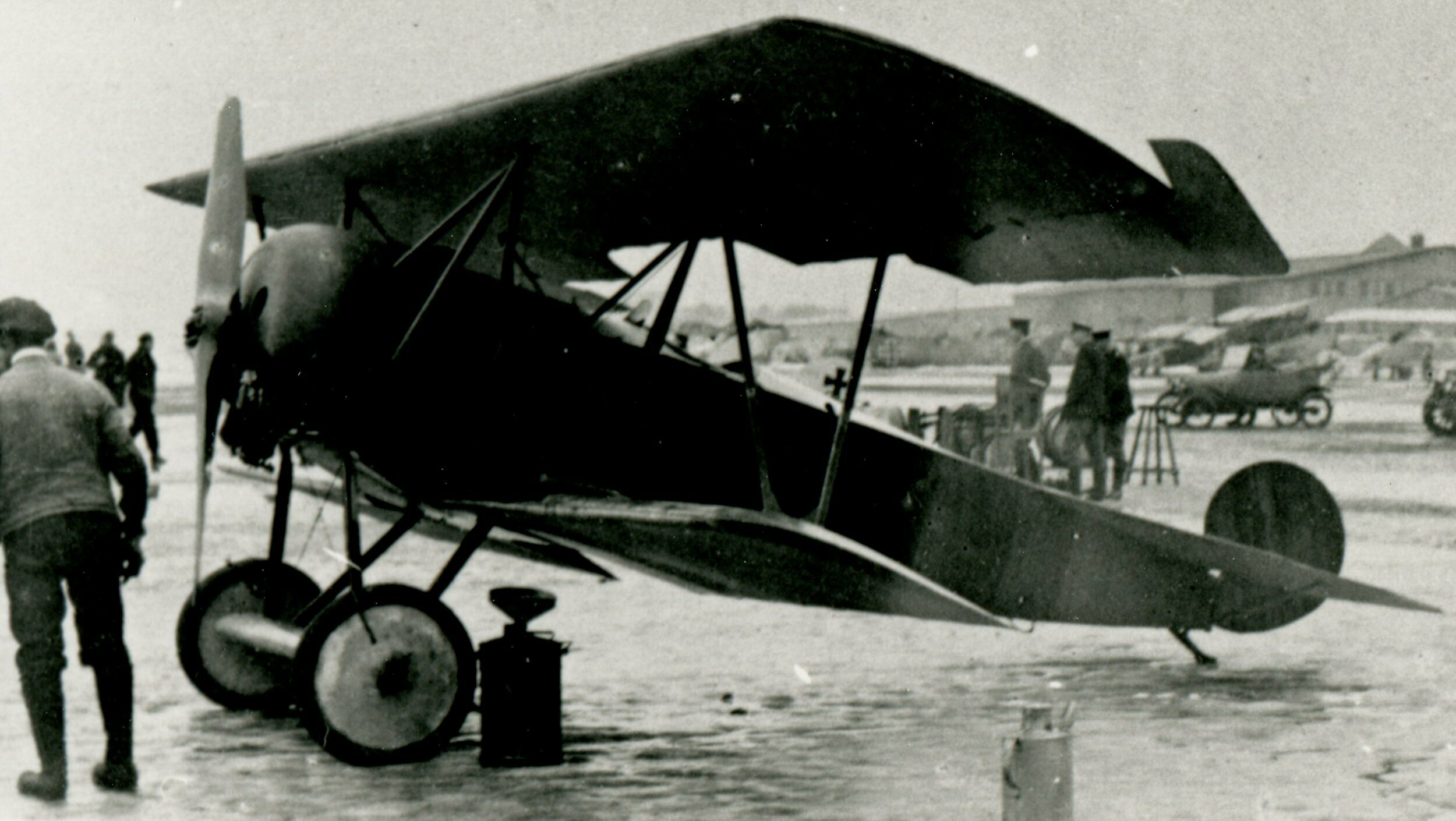

General information
- Type: Fighter
- Manufacturer: Fokker-Flugzeugwerke

History
- First flight: 1917
- Variants: Fokker D.VI

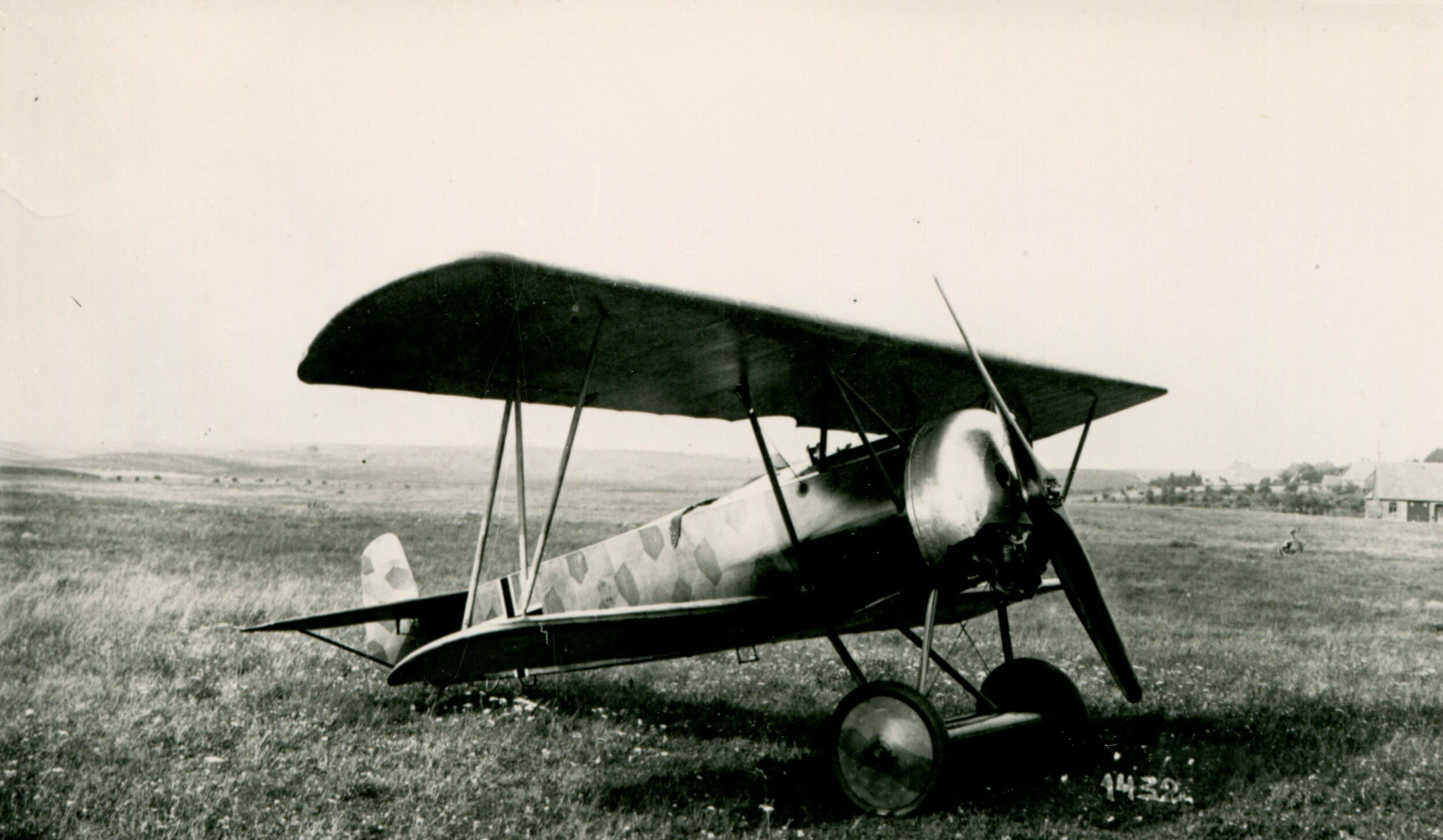
The V.33 in 1918

The Fokker V.9 was part of a series of experimental aircraft which led up to the low-production D.VI fighter. The aircraft were very similar, varying in detail and power plants.

The V.9 was powered by a 60 kW (80 hp) Oberursel U.O (later re-engined with a 110 hp Ur.II rotary) and first flew in December 1917; all others flew in 1918.

The V.12 was powered by an experimental 119 kW (160 hp), Steyr-Le Rhône engine.

The V.14. Like the V.12, the V.14 was powered by the 119 kW (160 hp) Steyr-Le Rhone.

The V.16 was powered by the 82 kW (110 hp) Oberursel Ur. II.

The V.33 was a development of the V.9. It was tested with both an 82 kW (110 hp) Ur. II engine and then a 108 kW (145 hp) Ur. III engine.

== Bibliography ==
- Herris, Jack & Leckscheid, Jörn (2023). Fokker Aircraft of WWI: Volume 5: 1918 Designs, Part 1 - Prototypes & D.VI: A Centennial Perspective on Great War Airplanes. Great War Aviation Centennial Series. Vol. 55A. n.p.: Aeronaut Books. ISBN 978-1-953201-09-6.
