= Friedrichshafen FF.17 =

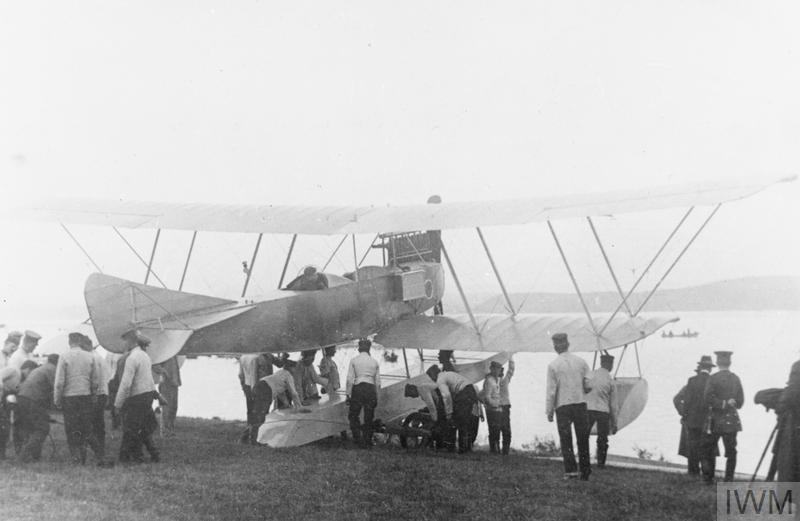
- A FF.17 at Lake Constance, May 1914

General information
- Type: Reconnaissance floatplane
- National origin: Germany
- Manufacturer: Flugzeugbau Friedrichshafen GmbH
- Number built: 1

History
- First flight: May 1914

The Friedrichshafen FF.17 was an experimental floatplane built in Germany in 1914. Originally designed and flown with a single main float and two outriggers as the FF.17, it was later modified as the FF.17b with two floats.

== Specifications (FF.17) ==
Data from Friedrichshafen Aircraft of WWI: A Centennial Perspective on Great War Airplanes; Flugzeugbau Friedrichshafen GmbH: Diplom-Ingenieur Theodor Kober

General characteristics

- Length: 10 m (32 ft 10 in)
- Wingspan: 15.2 m (49 ft 10 in)
- Wing area: 42 m^{2} (450 sq ft)
- Empty weight: 1,180 kg (2,601 lb)
- Gross weight: 1,500 kg (3,307 lb)
- Powerplant: 1 × NAG 6-cyl 135hp 6-cylinder water-cooled piston engine, 101 kW (135 hp)
- Propellers: 2-bladed fixed-pitch propeller

Performance

- Maximum speed: 90 km/h (56 mph, 49 kn)

== Bibliography ==
- Borzutzki, Siegfried (1993). Flugzeugbau Friedrichshafen GmbH: Diplom-Ingenieur Theodor Kober [Friedrichshafen Aircraft Company: Diploma-Engineer Theodore Kober] (in German). Berlin: Burbach. ISBN 3-927513-60-1.
- Herris, Jack (2016). Friedrichshafen Aircraft of WWI: A Centennial Perspective on Great War Airplanes. Great War Aviation Centennial Series. Vol. 21. Charleston, South Carolina: Aeronaut Books. ISBN 978-1-935881-35-3.
