= LTG FD 1 =

WW1 Seaplane of the Imperial German Navy

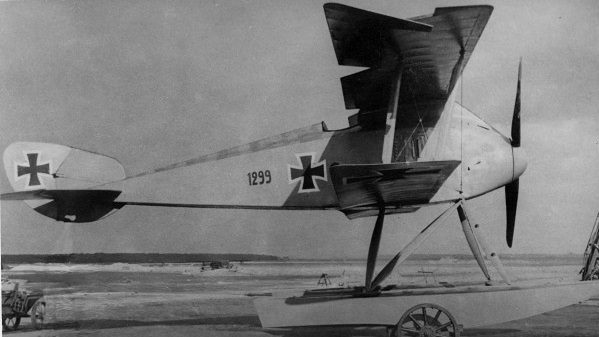
- Side view of the first prototype on beaching trolleys

General information
- Type: Floatplane fighter
- National origin: Germany
- Manufacturer: Luft Torpedo Gesellschaft
- Status: Prototype
- Primary user: Imperial German Navy
- Number built: 6

History
- First flight: 1917

The LTG FD 1 was a single-seat floatplane fighter built for the Imperial German Navy's (Kaiserliche Marine) Naval Air Service (Marine-Fliegerabteilung) by Luft Torpedo Gesellschaft (LTG) during World War I. Only six prototypes were built in 1917–1918 and are not known to have served on active duty.

== Development and description ==
LTG was founded in early 1915 to develop air-launched torpedoes and gradually expanded into sub-contracting aircraft components. It received an order for three prototypes (Marine numbers 1299–1301) for a floatplane fighter on 8 February 1917 that used a 150-horsepower (110 kW) Benz Bz.III engine that drove the two-bladed propeller through a Loeb geared transmission. The first airframe for static testing was delivered three months later and was destroyed during the process. The second aircraft was delivered in July, but flight testing showed it lacked maneuverability and longitudinal stability. As a result, the third prototype was sent back to the factory on 7 September. A version with conventional landing gear was tested at Johannisthal around this time.

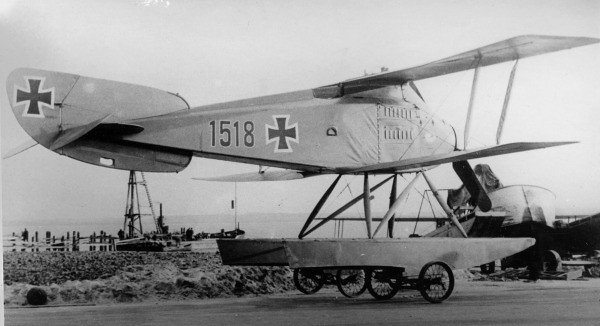
Rear oblique view of the first aircraft of the second batch showing the changes made from the first batch

In March 1918, the aircraft passed its static testing, and another batch of three prototypes (Marine numbers 1518–1520) was made. However, due to necessary changes, such as enlarging the vertical stabilizer, deliveries were delayed until July. They were still undergoing testing when the war ended in November and are not known to have served on active duty. When the Allies inspected the German seaplane bases in December, they recorded four surviving FD 1s at Hage. The fates of the FD 1s are unknown, but they were most likely scrapped.

== Specifications ==
Data from German Seaplanes of WWI: Sablatnig, Kaiserliche Werften, Lübeck-Travemünde, LTG, & Oertz: A Centennial Perspective on Great War Airplanes

General characteristics

- Crew: 1
- Length: 9.0 m (29 ft 6 in)
- Wingspan: 10.0 m (32 ft 10 in)
- Height: 3.55 m (11 ft 8 in)
- Empty weight: 895 kg (1,973 lb)
- Gross weight: 1,165 kg (2,568 lb)
- Powerplant: 1 × Benz Bz.III , 110 kW (150 hp) Originally measured as 150 PS (110 kW)

Performance

- Maximum speed: 145 km/h (90 mph, 78 kn)
- Time to altitude: 1,000 m (3,300 ft) in 4 minutes, 30 seconds
