= Friedrichshafen FF.49 =

1917 German floatplane

FF.49
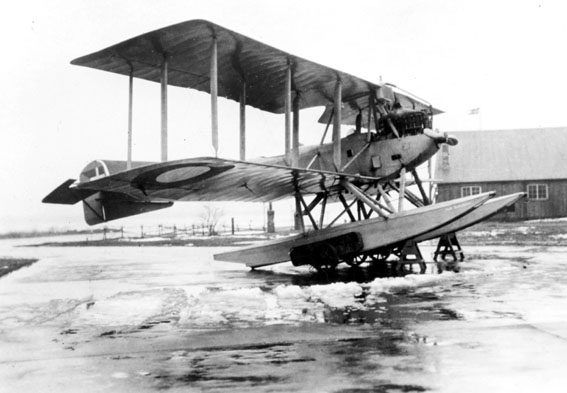

General information
- Type: Reconnaissance
- Manufacturer: Flugzeugbau Friedrichshafen GmbH
- Primary users: Kaiserliche Marine Finnish Air Force; Polish Air Force; Danish Navy
- Number built: 240

History
- Introduction date: September 1917
- First flight: 1917
- Developed from: Friedrichshafen FF.33

Friedrichshafen FF.49 was a German, two-seat, single-engine float-plane designed by Flugzeugbau Friedrichshafen in 1917.

== Variants ==
FF.39
Two-seat reconnaissance float-plane, powered by a 150 kW (200 hp) Benz Bz.IV water-cooled 6-cylinder piston engine. 14 built.
FF.49b
Two-seat bomber float-plane. 25 built.
FF.49c
Two-seat reconnaissance float-plane.
LFG V 1
Redesigned civil derivative of FF.49c by Luft-Fahrzeug-Gesellschaft (LFG) with wider fuselage, modified wing profile and seats for three passengers in raised cabin. Two converted 1919.
LFG V 2
Redesigned civil derivative of FF.49c by LFG with wider fuselage, modified wing profile and seats for five passengers in two cabins. Two converted 1919.
Orlogsværftet HB.II
Seven FF.49s re-conditioned at the Orlogsværftet / Flyvetroppernes Værksteder in Denmark.

== Operators ==
Denmark
Royal Danish Navy
Danish Air Lines started operations with a FF.49 equipped to carry two passengers on the Copenhagen–Warnemünde on 7 August 1920.
Finland
Finnish Air Force (four FF.49C, one FF.49B; in use 1918–1923)
German Empire
Kaiserliche Marine
Germany
Deutsche Luft-Reederei
Luftdeinst
Luft-Fahrzeug-Gesellschaft operated LFG V1 and V2s on passenger services between Stralsund and Rügen and joyriding at Baltic beach resorts 1919–1920.
Lloyd Luftverkehr Sablatnig
Netherlands
Royal Netherlands Navy
Norway
(four FF.49C, by A/S Aero)
Poland
Polish Air Force (postwar)
Sweden
Swedish Navy (postwar), (two FF.49C, in use 1919–1924)

== Specifications (FF.49c) ==
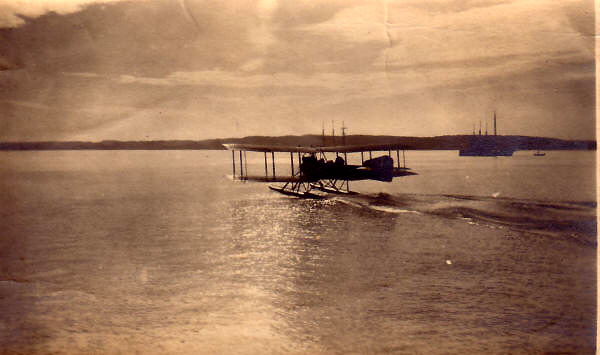
An FF.49 taking-off for a reconnaissance flight.

Data from Flugzeugbau Friedrichshafen GmbH, Thulinista Hornetiin – 75 vuotta Suomen ilmavoimien lentokoneita

General characteristics

- Crew: 2
- Length: 11.65 m (38 ft 3 in)
- Upper wingspan: 17.15 m (56 ft 3 in)
- Lower wingspan: 16.7 m (54 ft 9 in)
- Height: 4.45 m (14 ft 7 in)
- Wing area: 71.16 m^{2} (766.0 sq ft)
- Empty weight: 1,515 kg (3,340 lb)
- Gross weight: 2,147 kg (4,733 lb)
- Fuel capacity: 294 kg (648 lb)
- Powerplant: 1 × Benz Bz.IV 6-cylinder water-cooled in-line piston engine, 150 kW (200 hp)
- Propellers: 2-bladed fixed-pitch propeller

Performance

- Maximum speed: 140 km/h (87 mph, 76 kn)
- Cruise speed: 130 km/h (81 mph, 70 kn)
- Range: 700 km (430 mi, 380 nmi)
- Endurance: 5 hours 40 minutes
- Time to altitude:

800 m (2,600 ft) in 6 minutes 12 seconds
1,000 m (3,300 ft) in 8 minutes
1,500 m (4,900 ft) in 13 minutes 12 seconds

Armament

- Guns: 1 × fixed forward-firing 7.92 mm (0.312 in) LMG 08/15 machine gun; 1x flexible 7.92 mm (0.312 in) Parabellum MG14
- Bombs: 4 × 12.7 kg (28 lb) bombs

== See also ==
Related lists

- List of military aircraft of Finland
- List of military aircraft of Germany
- List of flying boats and floatplanes

== Bibliography ==
- Borzutzki, Siegfried (1993). Flugzeugbau Friedrichshafen GmbH: Diplom-Ingenieur Theodor Kober [Friedrichshafen Aircraft Company: Diploma-Engineer Theodore Kober] (in German). Berlin: Burbach. ISBN 3-927513-60-1.
- Herris, Jack (2016). Friedrichshafen Aircraft of WWI: A Centennial Perspective on Great War Airplanes. Great War Aviation Centennial Series. Vol. 21. Charleston, South Carolina: Aeronaut Books. ISBN 978-1-935881-35-3.
- Klaauw, Bart van der (March–April 1999). "Unexpected Windfalls: Accidentally or Deliberately, More than 100 Aircraft 'arrived' in Dutch Territory During the Great War". Air Enthusiast. No. 80. pp. 54–59. ISSN 0143-5450.
- Nelcarz, Bartolomiej & Peczkowski, Robert (2001). White Eagles: The Aircraft, Men and Operations of the Polish Air Force 1918–1939. Ottringham, UK: Hikoki Publications. ISBN 1-902109-73-2.
- Stroud, John (1966). European Transport Aircraft since 1920. London: Putnam.
- Stroud, John (April 1990). "Wings of Peace". Aeroplane Monthly. Vol. 18, no. 4. pp. 241–247. ISSN 0143-7240.
