= Theodor Kober =

Aircraft builder

Theodor Kober (1865 - 1930) was a twentieth-century German aviation engineer who contributed to the building of the first Zeppelin.

== Life ==
Kober was born 13 February 1865 in Stuttgart, Kingdom of Württemberg.

As an engineer Kober had worked for a balloon manufacturer and in the 1890s Count Ferdinand von Zeppelin enlisted him to produce designs for his airship concept. After several years he and Zeppelin produced the design for the Zeppelin LZ1. In 1912 Kober obtained his pilot's licence in Berlin-Johannisthal and, at the age of 47, was the third oldest German aviator at the time. In the same year he founded his own aircraft construction company, Flugzeugbau Friedrichshafen GmbH with financial support from Count Zeppelin. His company became a massive manufacturing powerhouse, building over 40% of the Kaiserliche Marine (Imperial German Navy) floatplanes during World War I. including the famous Friedrichshafen FF.33

His daughter Ilse Essers was a German engineer who established essential foundations in the field of aeronautical engineering.

Kober died on 20 December 1930 in Friedrichshafen.
