= Friedrichshafen FF.4 =

FF.4

General information
- Type: Reconnaissance floatplane
- National origin: Germany
- Manufacturer: Flugzeugbau Friedrichshafen GmbH
- Number built: 1

The Friedrichshafen FF.4 was a seaplane built in Germany in the early 1910s.

== Specifications (FF.4) ==
Data from

General characteristics

- Crew: 1
- Length: 11.2 m (36 ft 9 in)
- Wingspan: 12 m (39 ft 4 in)
- Gross weight: 1,860 kg (4,101 lb)
- Powerplant: 1 × Argus 4-cylinder water-cooled in-line piston engine, 48 kW (65 hp)

Performance

== Bibliography ==
- Herris, Jack (2016). Friedrichshafen Aircraft of WWI: A Centennial Perspective on Great War Airplanes. Great War Aviation Centennial Series. Vol. 21. Charleston, South Carolina: Aeronaut Books. ISBN 978-1-935881-35-3.
