= Fokker V.27 =

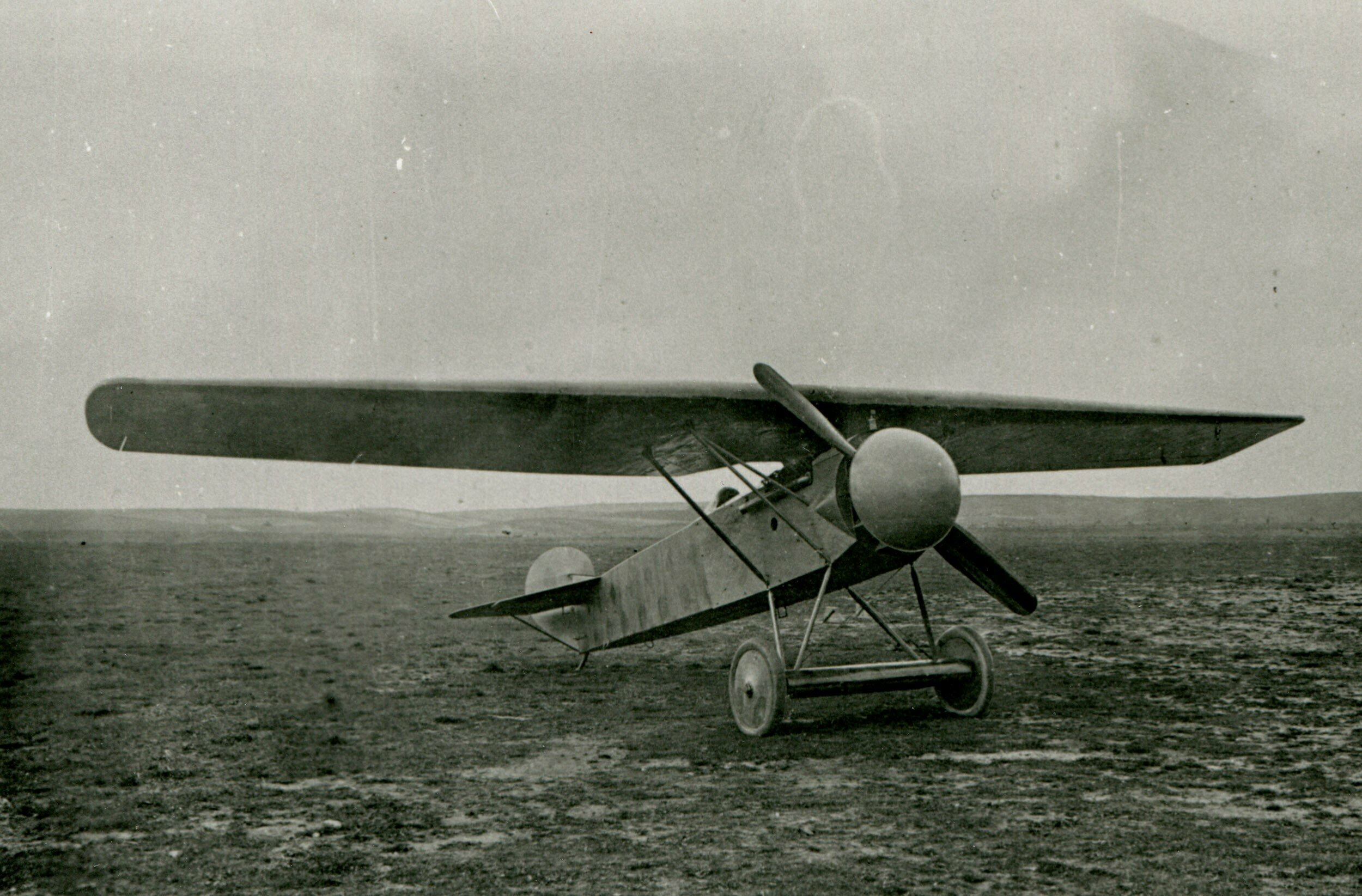
- Fokker V.33 prototype with armour cladding

General information
- Type: Fighter
- Manufacturer: Fokker-Flugzeugwerke
- Designer: Reinhold Platz

The Fokker V.27 was a German parasol-monoplane fighter prototype designed by Reinhold Platz and built by Fokker-Flugzeugwerke.

The V.27 was little more than an enlarged V.26 (prototype for the D.VIII) with a 145 kW (195 hp) Benz Bz.IIIb liquid-cooled inline engine. Once again, Fokker pursued similar aircraft with both rotary and inline engines. Fokker submitted the V.27 at the second fighter competition at Adlershof in May/June 1918.

The V.37 was a ground-attack variant of the V.27. It was fitted with extensive armor plating to protect the pilot and engine. Neither the V.27 nor the V.37 were placed in production.

== Bibliography ==
- Herris, Jack & Leckscheid, Jörn (2023). Fokker Aircraft of WWI: Volume 5: 1918 Designs, Part 1 - Prototypes & D.VI: A Centennial Perspective on Great War Airplanes. Great War Aviation Centennial Series. Vol. 55A. n.p.: Aeronaut Books. ISBN 978-1-953201-09-6.
