= Friedrichshafen FF.43 =

FF.43
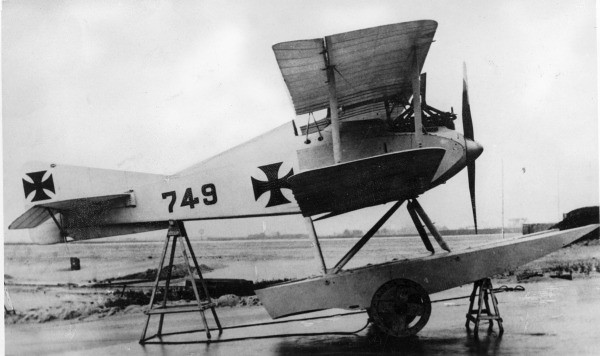

General information
- Type: Floatplane fighter
- Manufacturer: Flugzeugbau Friedrichshafen
- Number built: 1

History
- First flight: 8 September 1916

The Friedrichshafen FF.43 was a German prototype single-seat floatplane fighter developed during World War I by the Friedrichshafen Aircraft Company (Flugzeugbau Friedrichshafen) for the Imperial German Navy's (Kaiserliche Marine) Naval Air Service (Marine-Fliegerabteilung). Only one aircraft in 1916 was ordered; it shot down one British seaplane during operational trials later that year. It was destroyed in January 1917.

== Development and description ==
Designed for defence of the naval air stations, the Naval Air Service ordered a single FF.43 floatplane single-seat fighter from Friedrichshafen in January 1916. Unlike most aircraft designed by the company, the aircraft was of mixed wood and metal construction that was covered in doped fabric. A single-bay biplane, the upper wing was positioned close to the fuselage to improve the pilot's view above him. Its pair of floats were connected to the fuselage with a total of six struts. The FF.43 was powered by a 160-metric-horsepower (160 bhp) Mercedes D.III straight-six piston engine driving a two-bladed propeller with a spinner. The radiator was mounted on the surface of the upper wing and the engine's exhaust pipe extended upwards past the upper wing. The aircraft was armed with a pair of 7.92 mm (0.312 in) LMG 08/15 forward-firing machine guns, one gun mounted on each side of the engine.

The FF.43 made its first flight on 8 September and it was turned over to the Navy's Seaplane Experimental Command (Seeflugzeug-Versuchs-Kommando) about 30 September. Although it was slightly faster and more heavily armed than the competing Albatros W.4, it was not selected for production, possibly because its rate of climb was inferior to its competitor. The prototype was transferred to Naval Air Station Flanders I (Seeflugstation Flandern I) at Zeebrugge in Occupied Belgium on 4 October. On 10 November, its pilot forced one of a pair of Short 184 floatplanes on a patrol between Zeebrugge and Dunkirk, France, to make an emergency landing. The German pilots notified the port master in Ostende, but ships sent to locate the disabled aircraft found nothing. (Note: Schmeelke says that no losses by the Royal Navy Air Service are known for that date, speculating that the aircraft was recovered by the Royal Navy, although Herris gives names. Herris, pp. 176, 178; Schmeelke, pp. 109–110.) The FF.43 was destroyed in a landing accident on 23 January 1917.

== Specifications ==
Data from Flugzeugbau Friedrichshafen GmbH

General characteristics

- Crew: 1
- Length: 8.55 m (28 ft 1 in)
- Upper wingspan: 9.92 m (32 ft 7 in)
- Lower wingspan: 9.4 m (30 ft 10 in)
- Height: 3.35 m (11 ft 0 in)
- Wing area: 31 m^{2} (330 sq ft)
- Empty weight: 798 kg (1,759 lb)
- Gross weight: 1,078 kg (2,377 lb)
- Powerplant: 1 × Mercedes D.III 6-cylinder water-cooled in-line piston engine, 120 kW (160 hp)
- Propellers: 2-bladed fixed pitch propeller

Performance

- Maximum speed: 163 km/h (101 mph, 88 kn)
- Range: 400 km (250 mi, 220 nmi)
- Service ceiling: 3,000 m (9,800 ft)
- Time to altitude:

1,000 m (3,300 ft) in 6 minutes
2,000 m (6,600 ft) in 9 minutes
3,000 m (9,800 ft) in 22 minutes

Armament

- Guns: 2 × fixed, forward-firing 7.92 mm (0.312 in) LMG 08/15 machine guns

== See also ==
Related lists

- List of military aircraft of Germany
- List of flying boats and floatplanes

== Bibliography ==
- Borzutzki, Siegfried (1993). Flugzeugbau Friedrichshafen GmbH: Diplom-Ingenieur Theodor Kober [Friedrichshafen Aircraft Company: Diploma-Engineer Theodore Kober] (in German). Berlin: Burbach. ISBN 3-927513-60-1.
- Gray, Peter & Thetford, Owen (1987) [1970]. German Aircraft of the First World War (2nd ed.). London: Putnam. ISBN 0-85177-809-7.
- Herris, Jack (2016). Friedrichshafen Aircraft of WWI: A Centennial Perspective on Great War Airplanes. Great War Aviation Centennial Series. Vol. 21. Charleston, South Carolina: Aeronaut Books. ISBN 978-1-935881-35-3.
- Nowarra, Heinz J.; Robertson, Bruce & Cooksley, Peter G. (1966). Marine Aircraft of the 1914–1918 War. Letchworth, UK: Harleyford Publications. OCLC 123198808.
- Schmeelke, Michael (2018). Zeebrugge: Naval Air Station Flanders I 1914–1918. n. p.: Aeronaut Books. ISBN 978-1-935881-46-9.
