= Friedrichshafen FF.33 =

1914 German reconnaissance biplane

FF.33
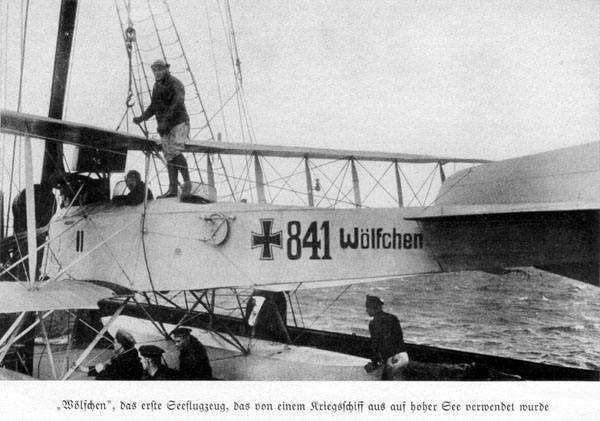
- The "Wölfchen" (Little Wolf) aboard SMS Wolf (1916).

General information
- Type: Fighter
- Manufacturer: Flugzeugbau Friedrichshafen GmbH
- Primary user: Kaiserliche Marine
- Number built: FF.33E: 180; FF.33L: 135

History
- Introduction date: 1914
- First flight: 1914

Friedrichshafen FF.33 was a German single-engined reconnaissance three-bay wing structure biplane, using twin floats, designed by Flugzeugbau Friedrichshafen in 1914 for the Marine-Fliegerabteilung aviation forces of the Kaiserliche Marine.

== Versions ==
FF.33
Initial production version powered by a Mercedes D.II engine, six built
FF.33b
FF.33 with pilot and observers positions reversed, additional observers-operated machine-gun and powered by 119 kW (160 hp) Maybach inline piston engine, five built.
FF.33e
Main production reconnaissance variant powered by a Benz Bz.III inline engine, longer twin floats, under tail central float removed, and radio transmitter instead of armament, about 180 built.
FF.33f
Scout/Fighter version based on FF.33e with reduced span wings and reduced length but fitted with a machine-gun on a pivoted mount, five built.
FF.33h
FF.33f with aerodynamic refinements, and duplication of wing-bay bracing cables as a safeguard if the observer has to fire his machine-gun forward through the wings, about 50 built.
FF.33j
FF.33e with aerodynamic refinements and the provision of a radio transmitter and receiver.
FF.33l
Main production scout/fighter version, with further aerodynamic improvements and a fixed machine gun, about 130 built
FF.33s
dual-control trainer version
FF.39
Refined version of the FF.33e with a 149 kW (200 hp) Benz Bz.IV engine, 14 built.
FF.49c
Further improved FF.39 with strengthened structures, balanced controls, a radio receiver and transmitter, machine-gun for observer, over 200 built.
FF.49b
Bomber variant of the FF.49c, crew positions reversed, deletion of observers machine-gun and provision to carry a light bombload, 15 built.
FF.59a
Development aircraft based on FF.39 with different tail, one built.
FF.59b
Development aircraft based on FF.39 with different tail, one built.
FF.59c
FF.39 with modified tail unit, wing interplane struts moved outwards and inner-bay bracing wires removed.
C.I
A landplane version of the FF.33l with wheeled landing gear, one built.
Grigorov 1
Aircraft built from parts from ostensibly "scrapped" FF.33es operated in Bulgaria.

== Operators ==
Bulgaria
Four FF.33Es and four FF.33Ls stationed since 1916 at the German Naval Air Station Peynerdjik near Varna on the Black Sea were transferred in June 1918 to the Bulgarian Navy. They were scrapped in 1920 in accordance with the clauses of the Peace Treaty.
Finland
Finnish Air Force purchased two FF.33Es from Germany in February 1918. The first one arrived on 20 April 1918 to Vaasa and the other one in the summer of 1918. The aircraft wore the German designation numbers 1999 and 1998, which were changed into the FAF designation numbers F16 and F24 (later S58/18 and S73/18). Another FF.33E was purchased from the Germans in Estonia on 26 November 1918. The type was in FAF service between 1918 and 1923.
German Empire
Kaiserliche Marine
Netherlands
Royal Netherlands Navy
Poland
Polish Navy operated three: FF.33E, FF.33H, FF.33L in 1920–1922
Sweden

- Swedish Navy
- Swedish Air Force

== Specifications (FF.33e) ==
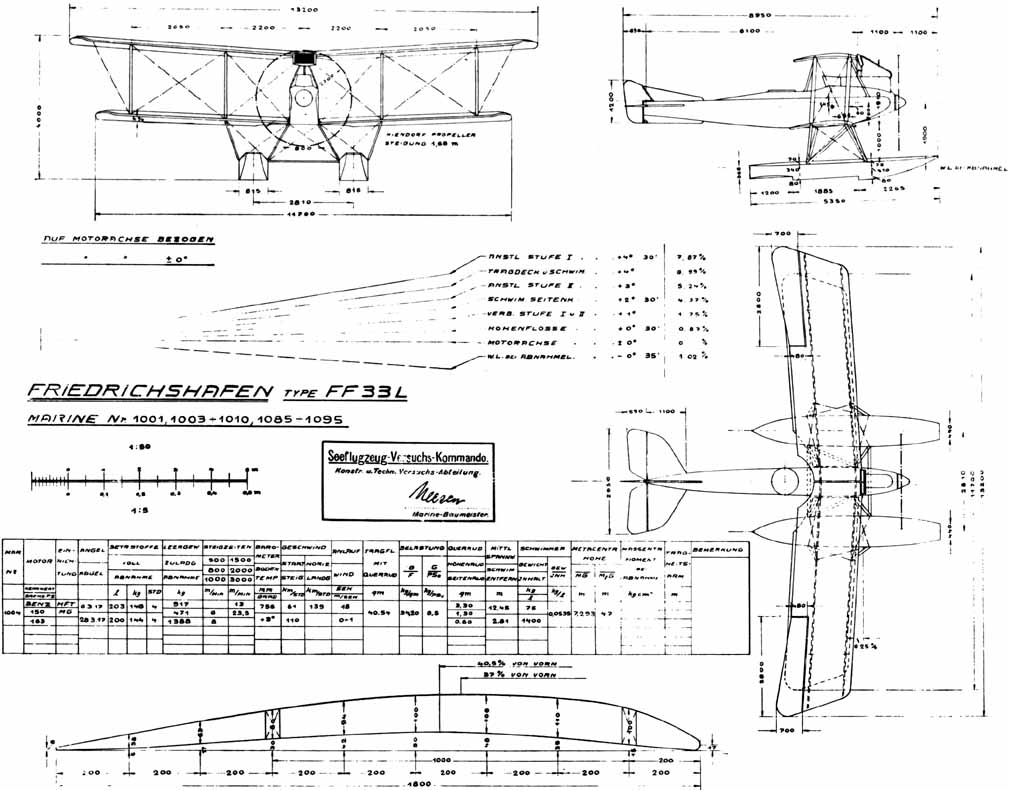
Friedrichshafen FF.33L factory submission Baubeschreibung drawing

Data from Thulinista Hornetiin - 75 vuotta Suomen ilmavoimien lentokoneita, Flugzeugbau Friedrichshafen GmbH : Diplom-Ingenieur Theodor Kober

General characteristics

- Crew: 2
- Length: 10.27 m (33 ft 8 in)
- Upper wingspan: 16.8 m (55 ft 1 in)
- Lower wingspan: 15.15 m (49 ft 8 in)
- Height: 3.73 m (12 ft 3 in)
- Wing area: 52.7 m^{2} (567 sq ft)
- Empty weight: 984 kg (2,169 lb) to 1,010 kg (2,230 lb)
- Gross weight: 1,635 kg (3,605 lb) to 1,675 kg (3,693 lb)
- Powerplant: 1 × Benz Bz.III 6-cylinder water-cooled in-line piston engine, 110 kW (150 hp)

Performance

- Maximum speed: 119–128 km/h (74–80 mph, 64–69 kn)
- Cruise speed: 110 km/h (68 mph, 59 kn)
- Range: 600 km (370 mi, 320 nmi) to 700 km (430 mi)
- Endurance: 4-5 hours
- Time to altitude: 500 m (1,600 ft) in 16 to 28 minutes

Armament

- Guns: 2x 7.92 mm (0.312 in) Parabellum MG14 machine-guns
- Bombs: 8 × 12 kg (26 lb) bombs

== Bibliography ==
- Anderson, Lennart (November–December 2019). "La renaissance de l'aviation militair bulgare dans les années vingt" [The Rebirth of Bulgarian Military Aviation in the Twenties]. Avions (in French) (232): 52–66. ISSN 1243-8650.
- Borzutzki, Siegfried (1993). Flugzeugbau Friedrichshafen GmbH: Diplom-Ingenieur Theodor Kober [Friedrichshafen Aircraft Company: Diploma-Engineer Theodore Kober] (in German). Berlin: Burbach. ISBN 3-927513-60-1.
- Cortet, Pierre (December 2001). "Rétros du Mois" [Retros of the Month]. Avions: Toute l'Aéronautique et son histoire (in French) (105): 7. ISSN 1243-8650.
- Herris, Jack (2016). Friedrichshafen Aircraft of WWI: A Centennial Perspective on Great War Airplanes. Great War Aviation Centennial Series. Vol. 21. Charleston, South Carolina: Aeronaut Books. ISBN 978-1-935881-35-3.
- Herris, Jack (2012). German Seaplane Fighters of WWI: A Centennial Perspective on Great War Seaplanes. Great War Aviation Centennial Series. Vol. 2. Charleston, South Carolina: Aeronaut Books. ISBN 978-1-935881-09-4.
- Klaauw, Bart van der (March–April 1999). "Unexpected Windfalls: Accidentally or Deliberately, More than 100 Aircraft 'arrived' in Dutch Territory During the Great War". Air Enthusiast (80): 54–59. ISSN 0143-5450.
- Nelcarz, Bartolomiej & Peczkowski, Robert (2001). White Eagles: The Aircraft, Men and Operations of the Polish Air Force 1918–1939. Ottringham, UK: Hikoki Publications. ISBN 1-902109-73-2.
