= Fokker D.VI =

1917 German fighter aircraft

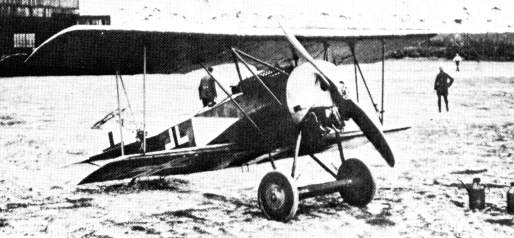

General information
- Type: Fighter
- Manufacturer: Fokker-Flugzeugwerke
- Designer: Reinhold Platz
- Primary user: Luftstreitkräfte
- Number built: 59

The Fokker D.VI was a German fighter aircraft built in limited numbers at the end of World War I. The D.VI served in the German and Austro-Hungarian air services.

== Design and development ==
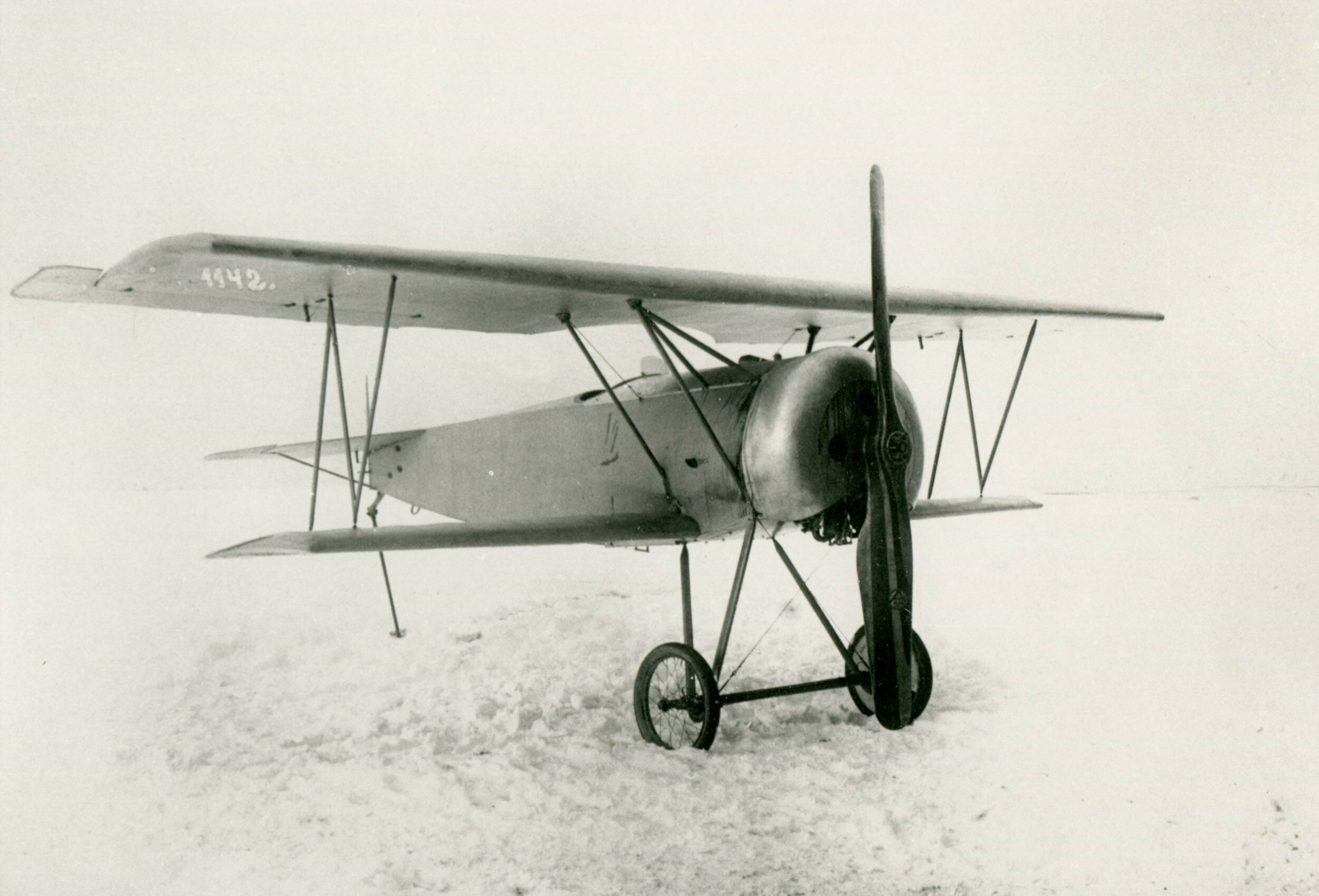
V.13 prototype

In late 1917, Fokker-Flugzeugwerke built two small biplane prototypes designated V.13. These aircraft combined a set of scaled-down D.VII wings with a fuselage and empennage closely mirroring those of the earlier Dr.I. The first prototype utilized an 82 kW (110 hp) Oberursel Ur.II rotary engine, while the second featured a 119 kW (160 hp) Siemens-Halske Sh.III bi-rotary engine.

Fokker submitted both prototypes at the Adlershof fighter trials in late January 1918. At that time, Fokker reengined the first prototype with the 108 kW (145 hp) Oberursel Ur.III. Pilots found the V.13s to be maneuverable and easy to fly. Idflieg issued a production contract after the V.13s were ultimately judged to be the best rotary powered entries of the competition.

== Operational history ==
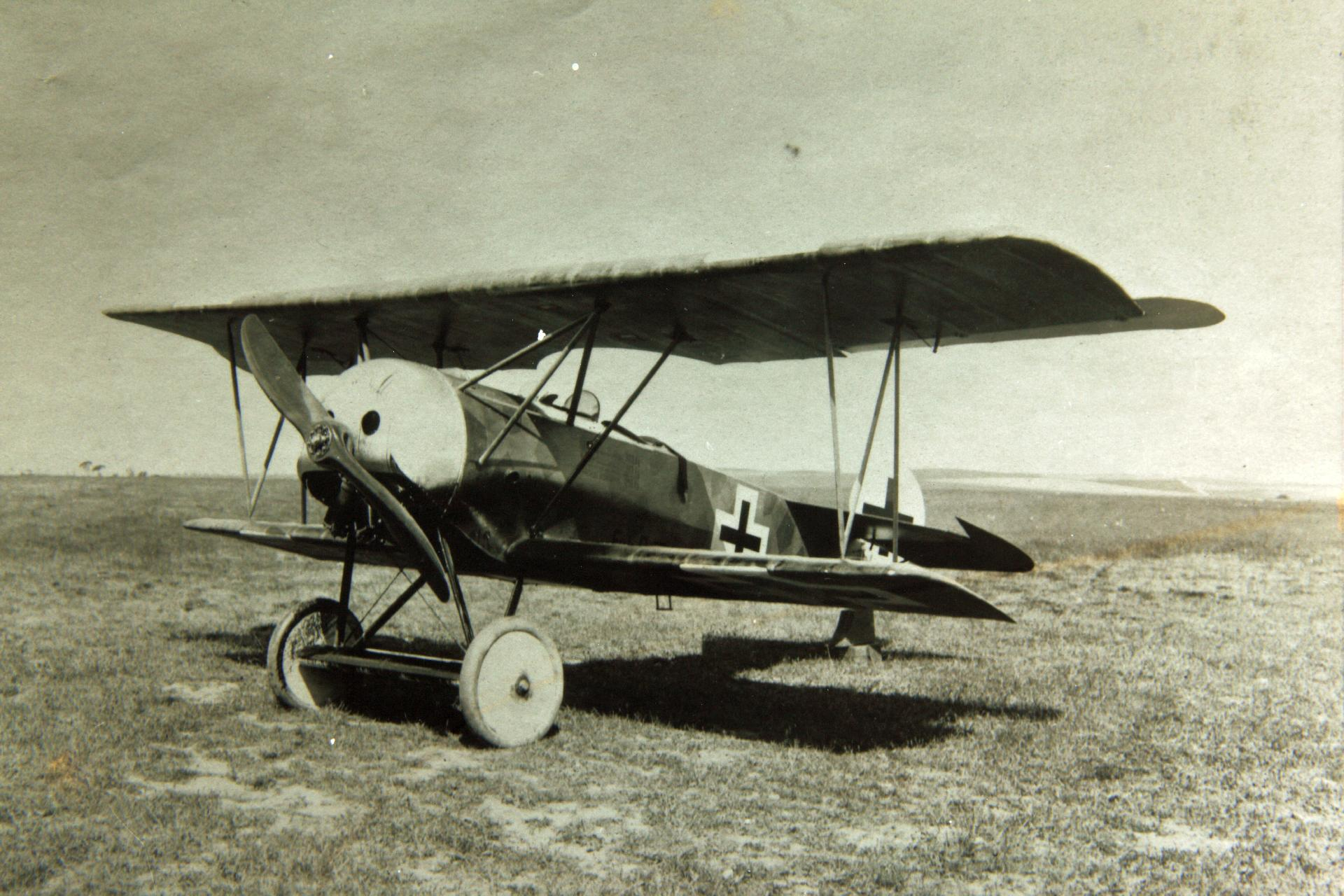
Fokker D.VI

The new aircraft, designated D.VI, passed its Typenprüfung (official type test) on 15 March 1918. The production aircraft utilized the Oberursel Ur.II, which was the only readily available German rotary engine. Idflieg authorized low level production pending availability of the more powerful Goebel Goe.III. Deliveries commenced in April and ceased in August, after only 59 aircraft had been completed. Seven aircraft were delivered to the Austro-Hungarian Air Service (Luftfahrtruppen).

In service, the D.VI was hampered by the low power of the Oberursel Ur.II. Moreover, the lack of castor oil and the poor quality of "Voltol," an ersatz lubricant, severely reduced engine life and reliability. The D.VI remained in frontline service until September 1918, and continued to serve in training and home defense units until the Armistice.

== Variants ==
- V.13/1 : First prototype, powered by a 108 kW (145 hp) Oberursel Ur.III rotary engine
- V.13/2 : Second prototype, powered by a 119 kW (160 hp) Siemens-Halske Sh.III rotary engine

== Operators ==
Austria-Hungary

- Luftfahrtruppen

German Empire

- Luftstreitkräfte

Kingdom of Hungary

- Royal Hungarian Air Force - Postwar.

Romania

- Romanian Air Corps - 6 captured during the war of 1919.

== Specifications ==
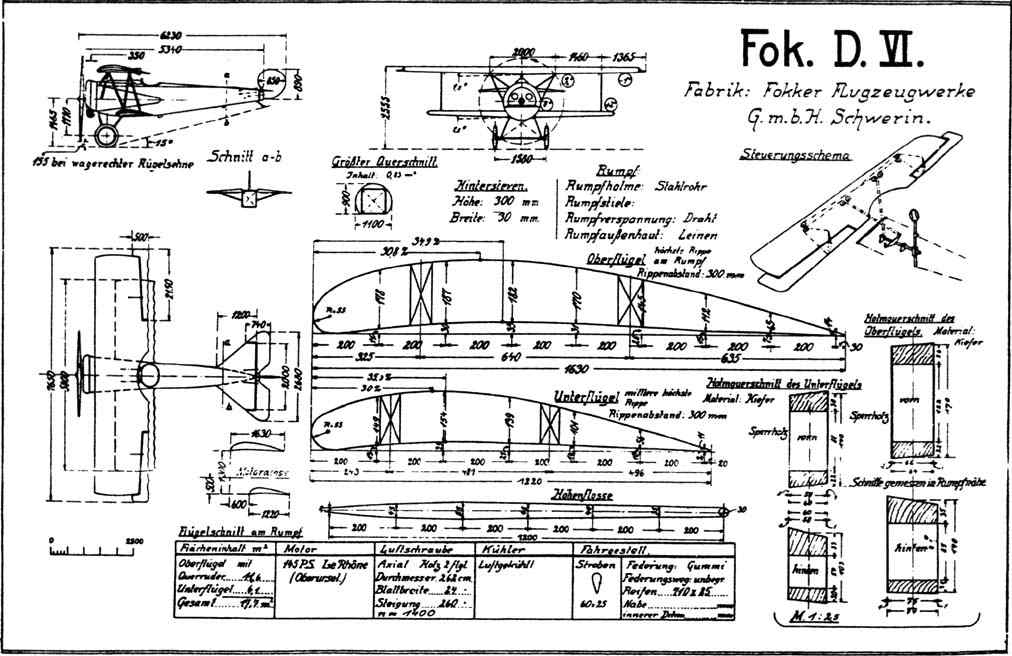
Fokker D.VI Baubeschreibung general arrangement drawing, as submitted to (and required by) IdFlieg

General characteristics

- Crew: one pilot
- Length: 6.25 m (20 ft 6 in)
- Wingspan: 7.66 m (25 ft 1 in)
- Height: 2.55 m (8 ft 4 in)
- Wing area: 17.7 m^{2} (190 sq ft)
- Empty weight: 393 kg (866 lb)
- Gross weight: 585 kg (1,290 lb)
- Powerplant: 1 × Oberursel Ur.II , 82 kW (110 hp)

Performance

- Maximum speed: 197 km/h (123 mph, 107 kn)
- Range: 300 km (186 mi, 162 nmi)
- Endurance: 1 hours 30 minutes
- Service ceiling: 6,000 m (19,680 ft)

Armament

- 2 × 7.92 mm (.312 in) LMG 08/15 "Spandau" machine guns
