= Flugzeugbau Friedrichshafen =

Defunct German aircraft manufacturer

Flugzeugbau Friedrichshafen GmbH
- Type: Gesellschaft mit beschränkter Haftung
- Industry: Aircraft manufacturing
- Founded: June 17, 1912; 114 years ago in Friedrichshafen, Germany
- Founder: Theodor Kober
- Defunct: 1923
- Fate: Acquired by Dornier Flugzeugwerke
- Headquarters: Friedrichshafen, Germany
- Key people: Karl Gehlen
- Products: Seaplanes
- Number of employees: 3,240 (1918)

Flugzeugbau Friedrichshafen GmbH was a German aircraft manufacturing company.

== Overview ==
The company was founded in 1912 in Friedrichshafen, Germany by Theodor Kober who had previously worked for the Zeppelin company. The town, which is located by the Bodensee, was already famous in aviation circles as the place where Zeppelin airships were built. During the First World War, Flugzeugbau Friedrichshafen mainly built seaplanes for the Marine-Fliegerabteilung units of the Imperial German Navy, and a highly successful series of land-based medium bombers for the Imperial Air Service under the aegis of head designer Karl Gehlen.

After the Armistice, the company took over the old Zeppelin shed at Manzell. They would also start production in Weingarten and Warnemünde. When the company failed in 1923, their production facilities were taken over by Dornier Flugzeugwerke.
