= Schlasta =

Schlachtstaffeln
- Active: 1917–1918
- Country: German Empire
- Branch: Luftstreitkräfte
- Type: Fighter-bomber squadrons
- Role: Close air support, ground attack
- Size: 4–6 aircraft per squadron
- Engagements: Battle of Cambrai, Kaiserschlacht (Spring Offensive 1918)

The Schlachtstaffeln (often abbreviated to Schlastas) were specialized ground attack squadrons in the German Luftstreitkräfte during World War I.

== Background ==
The Schlastas had their origins in the Schutzstaffeln (escort squadrons, often abbreviated to "Schusta") initially formed to escort reconnaissance aircraft. However, during 1917 the Schustas were increasingly employed for ground attack missions and deployed with regular reconnaissance aircraft for what the Allies termed "contact-patrols"; reconnaissance missions at low altitude over the front lines. The aircraft involved in such missions were often subjected to very heavy ground fire, and it became clear to the German High command that new, specialised units and more robust aircraft types were needed for these missions.

== Organisation and Tactics ==
Their success in the CAS (close air support) and "contact-patrol" roles led to the Schustas being re-designated as "Schlachtstaffeln" (literally Battle Squadrons) who now specialised in CAS operations while the more reconnaissance intensive "contact-patrols" were taken over by the Flieger Abteilung (Infantrie) squadrons who specialised in very low altitude infantry co-operation, communication and reconnaissance. Schlastas operated a mix of un-armoured but highly manoeuvrable two-seat fighters such as the Halberstadt CL.II and the Hannover CL.II as well as later armored types such as the Albatros J.I and the AEG J.I. The Fl. Abt. (Inf.) units would, however, usually operate only the armoured aircraft types including the very successful Junkers J.I. A Schlasta operated according to a strict set of orders that required it to stick to a pre-determined "sphere of action". The intention of this rule was to prevent the effectiveness of the Schlastas from being diluted by secondary tasks. Schlastas were attached to field armies, corps and even individual divisions to ensure the closest possible co-operation with ground forces. When attacking, Schlastas would try to stay in close contact with ground forces, although this was difficult since aircraft were not universally equipped with radio at the time. Communication was often accomplished by message drops by the aircraft and signals laid out in predescribed symbol form by the ground forces in response. Radio communications were used when such equipment was available. A Schlasta usually consisted of 4-6 aircraft which was the maximum number a formation leader could effectively command without voice radio. The ability of a Schlasta leader to exercise control over his flight was important since a concentrated low altitude mass attack, preferably in formation, by multiple squadrons were at the heart of Schlasta tactics. The "spheres of action" assigned to different Schlasta included enemy infantry formations, airfields, artillery positions, unit headquarters, supply columns and even tanks, attacking with machine-gun fire, small fragmenting mortar bombs and hand grenades.

The Fl. Abt. (Inf.) squadrons, however, concentrated on tracking and communicating with spearhead units during attacks, and with isolated units during defensive operations, thus giving Army commanders up-to-date information on what was happening at the front. Schlasta crews were also required to report any battlefield intelligence acquired during operations without delay.

== History ==
Traditionally some historians have considered the air forces of the First World War to have had relatively little direct effect on events on the ground with their CAS and tactical bombing efforts. It is certainly true that the effect of ground attack units during this period was not as great as it was during the Second World War, where ground attack aircraft could have a devastating effect on ground forces. (For example, during the attacks launched by the air forces of the Second World War Allies on German troops in the Falaise pocket.)

The offensive power of the Schlastas should nevertheless not be underestimated, a mass ground attack operation conducted by several Schlastas could have a significant effect on enemy ground forces. During the battle of Cambrai, one of the first battles where Schlastas (or Schustas as they were still designated at the time of Cambrai) were used in large numbers for ground-attack operations, they played a key role in the success of German counterattacks by constantly harassing the defending British forces. They attacked both British reinforcements on their way to the front and the retreating British forces with machine-gun fire and bombs. The morale of the British soldiers suffered considerably as a result of these attacks . As the First World War dragged on the Schlastas suffered increasing losses, due to the increasing numerical advantage of the opposing Entente Powers fighter forces and as the Entente armies adapted their tactics and equipment to counter the Schlastas threat. After the initial shock following the mass deployment of Schlastas in the battle of Cambrai the Entente armies quickly enhanced low level air defences in rear areas using machine guns and shell firing Autocannon. Increased emphasis was also placed on low altitude fighter cover for ground forces.

The Schlastas nevertheless remained a force to be reckoned with. Their aircraft remained highly agile two-seat fighters fitted with rear firing gun turrets and were no easy target for an Entente fighter pilot. The Junkers J.I in particular acquired a reputation for being almost impossible to shoot down. Schlastas made substantial contributions towards the success of the Kaiserschlacht, the German Spring Offensive of 1918 and fought numerous defensive actions until the end of the war.

The experience gained from the Schlasta operations of the First World War was an important reason why the Second World War German Luftwaffe placed such emphasis on close air support operations.

== Bibliography ==
- Gray, Peter; Owen Thetford (1962). German Aircraft of the first World War. London: Putnam. ISBN 0-85177-809-7.
- Duiven, Rick; Dan-San Abbot (2006). Schlachtflieger!. Atglen PA: Schiffer Military History. ISBN 0-7643-2441-1.
