= Albatros J.II =

J.II
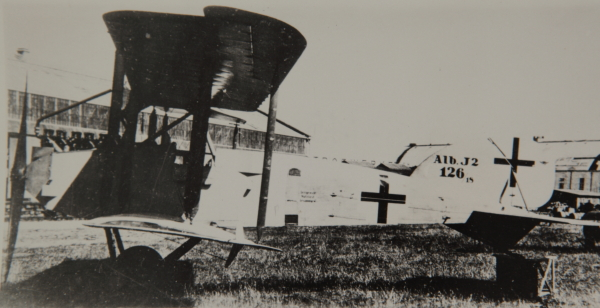

General information
- Type: Ground-attack aircraft
- Manufacturer: Albatros Flugzeugwerke
- Primary user: Luftstreitkräfte

The Albatros J.II was a German single-engine, single-seat, biplane ground-attack aircraft of World War I.

== Design and development ==
Albatros J.II was a development of the Albatros J.I with increased fuselage armour and a more powerful engine. The J.II dispensed with the propeller spinner of the earlier aircraft.

== Operators ==
German Empire

- Luftstreitkräfte

Lithuania

- Lithuanian Air Force - 3 units (production No. 705, 710, 714)

== Specifications (J.II) ==
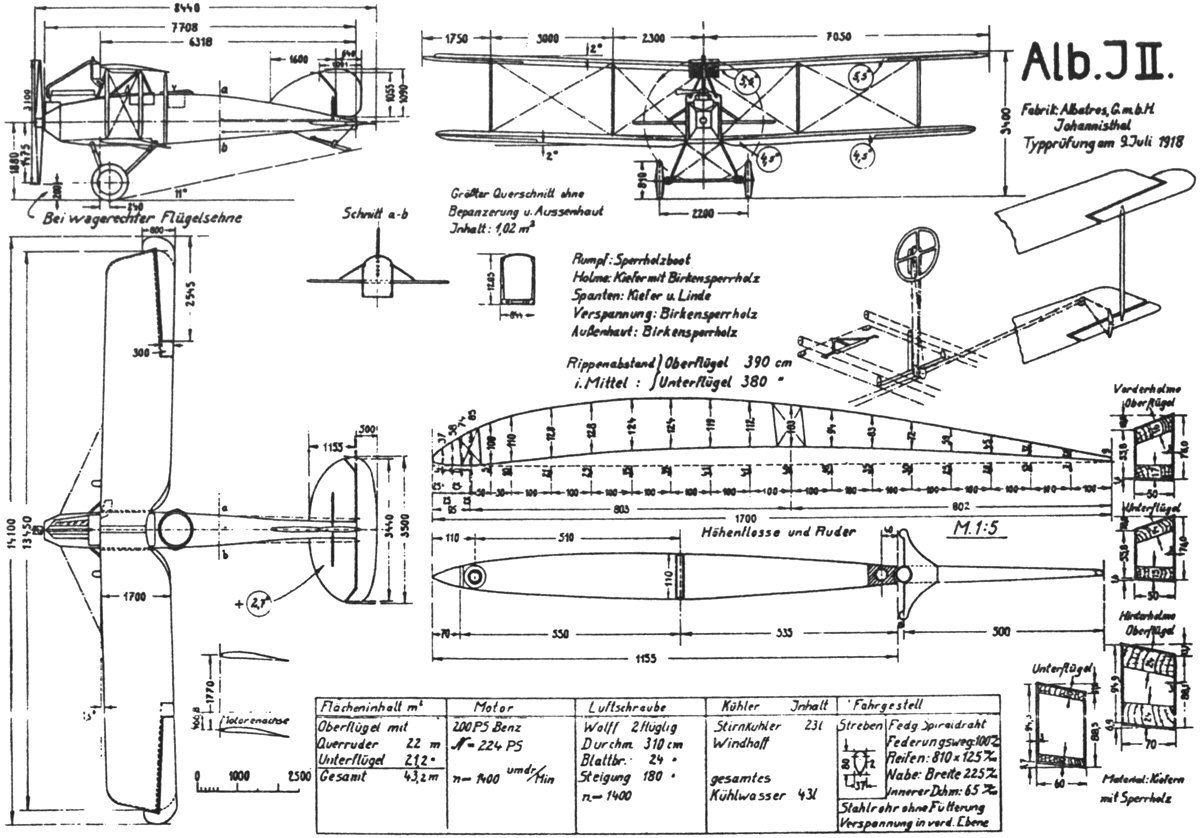
Albatros J.II drawing

General characteristics

- Crew: two, pilot and observer
- Powerplant: 1 × Benz Bz.IVa , 164 kW (220 hp)

== See also ==
Related development

- Albatros C.XII
- Albatros J.I

Aircraft of comparable role, configuration, and era

- AEG J.I
- AEG J.II
- Junkers J.I

== Bibliography ==
- Herris, Jack (2017). Albatros Aircraft of WWI: A Centennial Perspective on Great War Airplanes: Volume 3: Bombers, Seaplanes, J-Types. Great War Aviation Centennial Series. Vol. 26. Charleston, South Carolina: Aeronaut Books. ISBN 978-1-935881-49-0.
- Herris, Jack (2012). German Armored Warplanes of WWI: A Centennial Perspective of Great War Airplanes. Great War Aviation Centennial Series. Vol. 4. Charleston, South Carolina: Aeronaut Books. ISBN 978-1-935881-11-7.
- Taylor, Michael J. H. (1989). Jane's Encyclopedia of Aviation. London: Studio Editions. p. 55.
