= Albatros J.I =

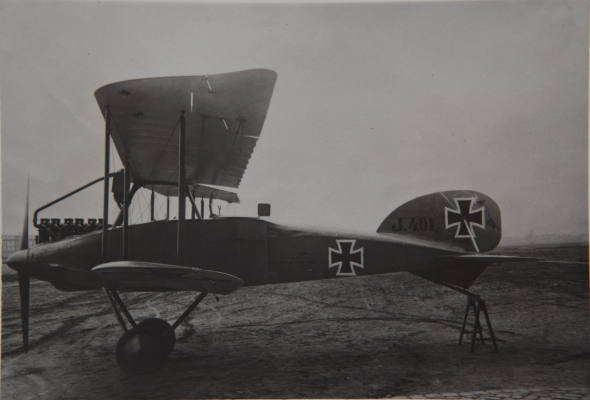

General information
- Type: Ground-attack aircraft
- Manufacturer: Albatros Flugzeugwerke
- Primary users: Luftstreitkräfte Polish Air Force
- Number built: ~240

History
- Introduction date: 1917
- First flight: 1917
- Retired: 1921
- Developed from: Albatros C.XII

The Albatros J.I was an armored ground attack airplane designed and produced by the German aircraft manufacturer Albatros Flugzeugwerke. It saw active combat during the final months of the First World War.

The J.I was a "J-class" derivative of the Albatros C.XII reconnaissance aircraft; it shared both the wings and tail of the C.XII while adopting a new semi-armoured fuselage to protect its occupants from the anticipated ground fire from conducting low-altitude attack and reconnaissance missions over the battlefield. It was armed with three 7.92 mm (.312 in) machine guns, two of which were fixed in a downwards position for strafing ground targets. The heavy armouring around the crew compartment negatively impacted its performance capabilities.

During April 1918, units of the Luftstreitkräfte began receiving the J.I; it was commonly well-received by its crews due to its protection and good visibility. While the newer Albatros J.II began to replace it in frontline use only months later, the aircraft continued to be operated through to the Armistice of 11 November 1918 that ended the conflict. In addition to Germany, the J.I also was operated by Austria-Hungary, Poland, Norway, and Ukraine. Poland, which had captured ten aircraft during the Greater Poland Uprising, deployed them into combat during the Polish–Soviet War; the Ukrainian People's Army also used J.Is against the Soviet Union.

== Design and development ==
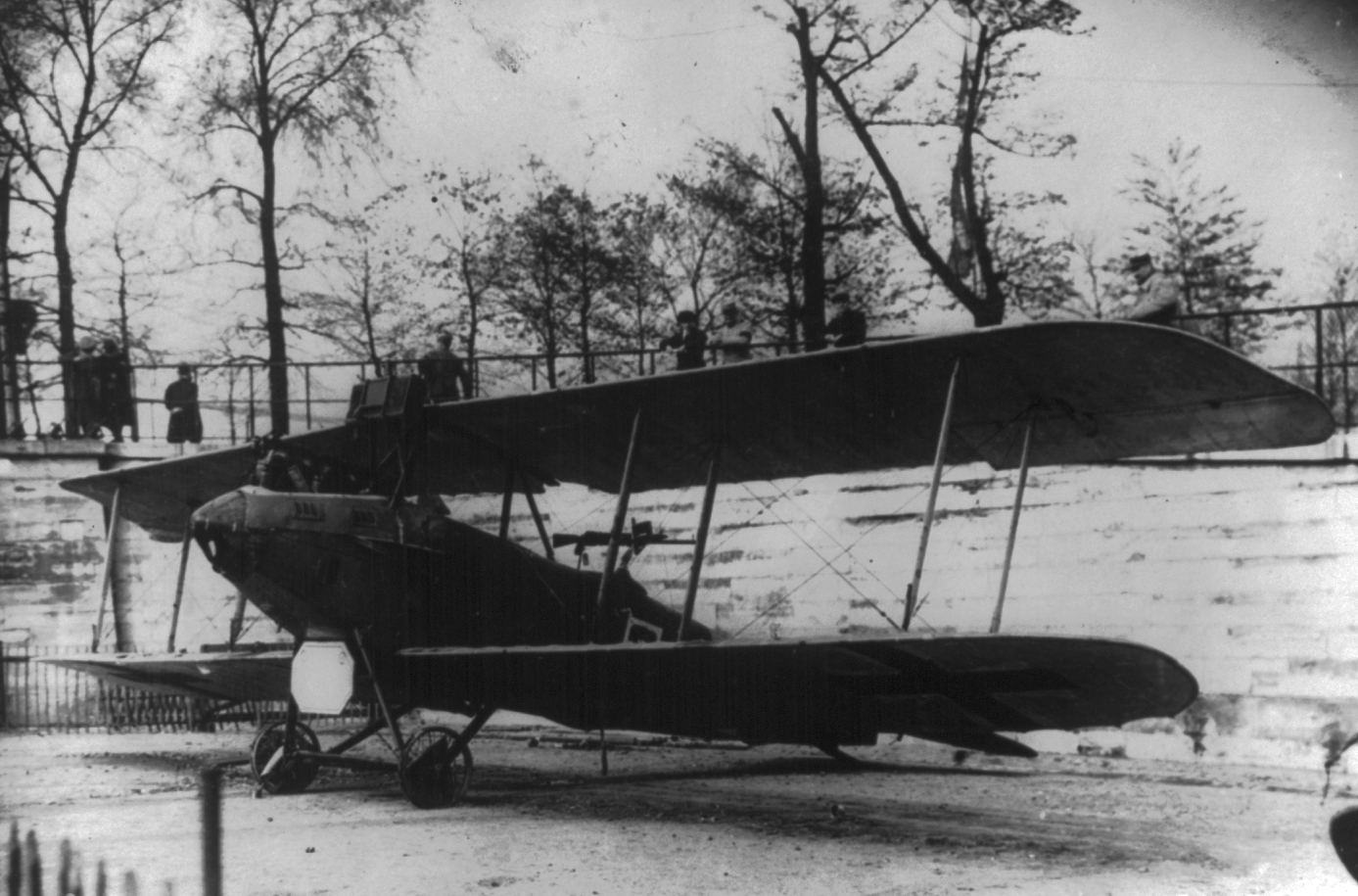
A captured German Albatros J.I on display in the United States, circa 1919

The Albatros J.I was developed specifically as a "J-class" aircraft, which had the purpose of conducting low-altitude battlefield reconnaissance and ground-attack missions with the intended mission altitudes being around 50 meters (150 feet). Albatros' design team opted to develop the J.I as a derivative of the Albatros C.XII reconnaissance aircraft. In terms of its general configuration, the J.I shared both the wings and tail of the C.XII while adopting a new slab-sided fuselage, which was semi-armoured to protect its occupants from ground fire. This steel plate armouring around the crew compartment, which weighed 490 kg (1,080 lb), came at a substantial cost in terms of performance. The poor climb performance was not deemed to be particularly impactful as the J.I was intended to continuously fly at a relatively low altitude throughout its entire mission profile.

The overall design of the fuselage conformed to Albatros' established conventions, comprising multi-ply formers, six primary longerons, and skinned using plywood that was both pinned and glued to the structure. While the bottom of the fuselage was flat, the top decking had an almost semi-circular curvature. Both the sides and bottom of the fuselage were covered by 5 mm thick chrome-nickel steel plate, which was bolted directly onto the wooden frame. Aft of the cockpit, the exterior was covered by plywood instead. To avoid compromising the armour, there was no cutaway on either side of the forward cockpit to facilitate the pilot's entry and egress; instead, an outwards-folding panel was present.

Unlike the C.XII, which was powered by the Mercedes D.IVa engine, capable of up to 190 kW (260 hp), the J.I was instead equipped with the Benz Bz.IV, which could produce up to 150 kW (200 hp); this choice in powerplant in combination with the considerably heavier fuselage was heavily responsible for the J.I's performance capabilities being marginal at best. While partially covered by rounded sheet metal, the nose of the aircraft was unarmoured and thus the engine was left relatively unprotected. As a consequence of the nose's downwards sloping, pilots of the J.I enjoyed relatively favourable forward visibility.

As a ground-attack aircraft, the J.I was armed with a pair of fixed 7.92 mm (.312 in) Spandau LMG 08/15 machine guns that faced downwards for the purpose of strafing ground targets; the observer was also provided with a separate freely-moving 7.92 mm Parabellum MG14 machine gun.

== Operational history ==
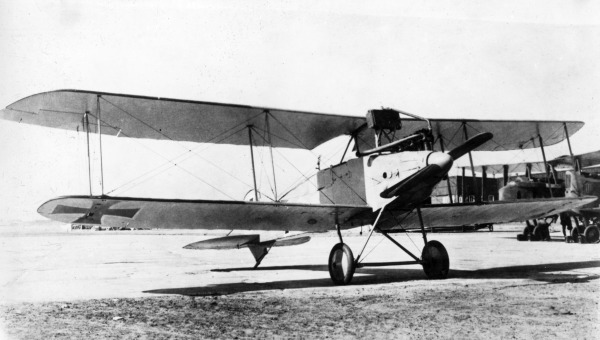
An Albatros J.I

During April 1918, units of the Luftstreitkräfte began receiving the J.I. Shortly thereafter, the type saw its combat debut during the Battle of the Lys. The J.I were typically issued to Flieger Abteilungen in support of the Army Corps or Army Headquarters; operationally, it was typically flown in flights comprising three to six aircraft at a time. The type was relatively popular amongst its crews, often due to the armor protection provided and the good visibility facilitated by its low set engine. It was commonly deemed to be an operational success, although a frequent criticism of the J.I was that its armour was still inadequate.

By June 1918, the new Albatros J.II had started to replace J.I at the front. Nevertheless, the older aircraft nevertheless served until the end of the conflict. Two were bought by Austria-Hungary. After the conflict, J.Is remained in operation for a time with several nations, including Poland, Norway, and Ukraine. Poland was the largest post-war user of the type, operating 10 aircraft, which were captured during the Greater Poland Uprising. These J.Is were used during the Polish–Soviet War. Additionally, between September 1920 and February 1921, four aircraft were lent by the Polish to an allied 1st Zaporizhska Aviation Escadrille of the Ukrainian People's Army.

== Operators ==
German Empire

- Luftstreitkräfte

Poland

- Polish Air Force operated 10 aircraft postwar until 1921

Ukraine

- Ukrainian People's Army operated four aircraft, lent by the Polish

== Specifications (J.I) ==
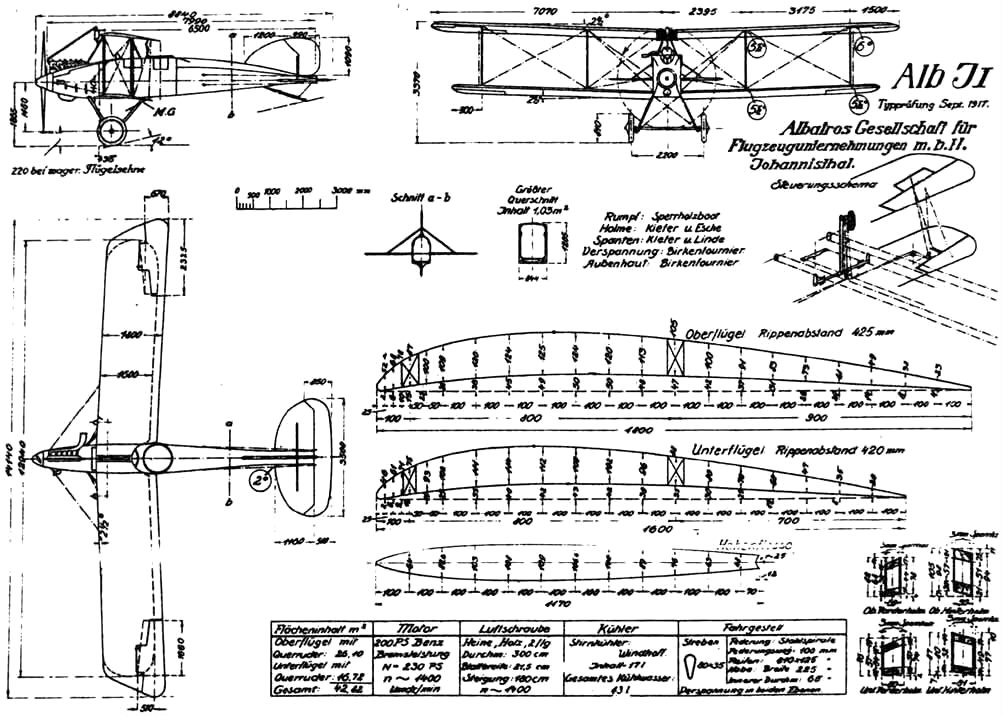
Albatros J.I drawing

Data from German Aircraft of the First World War

General characteristics

- Crew: two (pilot and observer)
- Length: 8.80 m (28 ft 10 in)
- Wingspan: 14.14 m (46 ft 5 in)
- Height: 3.37 m (11 ft 1 in)
- Wing area: 43.0 m^{2} (463 sq ft)
- Empty weight: 1,398 kg (3,082 lb)
- Gross weight: 1,808 kg (3,986 lb)
- Powerplant: 1 × Benz Bz.IV , 150 kW (200 hp)

Performance

- Maximum speed: 140 km/h (90 mph, 78 kn)
- Range: 350 km (220 mi, 190 nmi)
- Service ceiling: 4,500 m (14,800 ft)
- Rate of climb: 2.0 m/s (400 ft/min)

Armament

- 2 × 7.92 mm (.312 in) Spandau LMG 08/15 machine guns, fixed downward
- 1 × 7.92 mm (.312 in) Parabellum MG14 machine gun for observer

== See also ==
Related development

- Albatros C.XII
- Albatros J.II

Aircraft of comparable role, configuration, and era

- AEG J.I
- AEG J.II
- Junkers J.I
