= Deutsche Luft-Reederei =

1919–1926 airline in Germany

IATA	ICAO	Call sign
-	-	-
- Founded: December 1917; 108 years ago
- Commenced operations: 5 February 1919; 107 years ago
- Ceased operations: 6 January 1926; 100 years ago (merged with Junkers Luftverkehr to form Deutsche Luft Hansa)

Deutsche Luft-Reederei (D.L.R.), was a German airline established in December 1917 which started operating in 1919.

== History ==
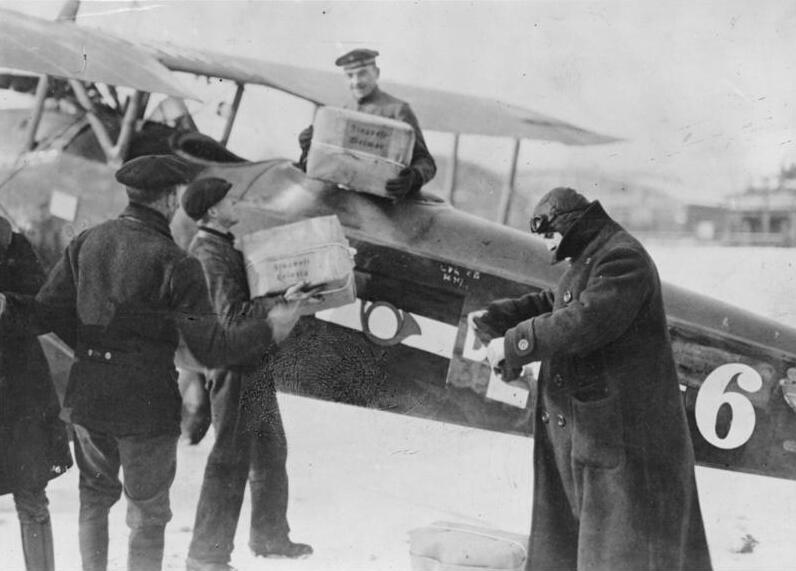
Air transport between Berlin and Weimar February 1919

The name means "German (Deutsche) Air (Luft) Shipping Company (Reederei)". D.L.R. was reorganized as Aero Lloyd AG in 1923. In 1926 the German government forced the airline to merge with Junkers Luftverkehr to form Deutsche Luft Hansa, the flag carrier of the Weimar Republic. The airline's logo was a stylised crane, designed by Professor Otto Firle. This was adopted by Deutsche Luft Hansa in 1926, and again by Lufthansa in 1955.

The AEG company, a large producer of electrical equipment, started building airplanes for the military during World War I. To create continued demand for this new product after the end of the war, the company started a commercial airline, the D.L.R. Walther Rathenau, chairman of the board of AEG, was the driving force behind the airline. In spite of receiving government subsidies the airline was not profitable, so in 1923 AEG reorganized the D.L.R. and transferred its assets and operations to a new airline: Deutscher Aero-Lloyd. This was a joint venture of AEG, the HAPAG, Luftschiffbau Zeppelin, the Deutsche Bank and Dornier Metallbauten.

D.L.R. was the first German airline to use heavier than air aircraft. DELAG was the first German airline and the first airline in the world, but operated lighter than air airships made by the Zeppelin company. Like many other early European airlines, the D.L.R. operated former World War I military machines, e.g. the AEG J.II, LVG C.VI. At first all passengers rode in open cockpits, then some airplanes were modified to seat two or three passengers in an enclosed cabin.

The first D.L.R. flight was on February 5, 1919, carrying mail and newspapers from Berlin to Weimar. The airline began carrying passengers in the following month. More destinations were added, e.g. Hamburg, Hannover. In its first year, 1919, the airline operated regularly scheduled flights on routes with a combined length of 1580 km (nearly 1000 miles). By 1921 the route network was more than 3000 km (1865 miles) long, and included destinations in the Netherlands, Scandinavia and the Baltic Republics.

In 1919, D.L.R. was one of the founding members of International Air Traffic Association, the predecessor to today's IATA.

In 1920 the D.L.R. carried 2665 passengers, in 1921 8341. From 1919 to 1921 there were no serious accidents and no fatalities, only some minor injuries. Since instrument flight had not been developed yet, flying was only possible in good weather. Out of all flights scheduled in 1919 92% were actually flown. In 1921 this rate increased to 96%. However the airline did not operate in the winter months.
