= AEG J.I =

German ground-attack biplane from WW1

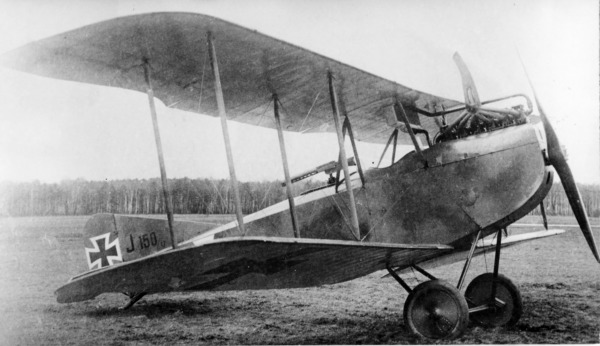

General information
- Type: Armoured ground attack aircraft
- National origin: Germany
- Manufacturer: AEG
- Primary user: Luftstreitkräfte
- Number built: 609

History
- Manufactured: 1917–1918
- Developed from: AEG C.IV

The AEG J.I was a German biplane ground attack aircraft designed and produced by the German aircraft manufacturer Allgemeine Elektricitäts-Gesellschaft. It was a mission-specific derivative of the AEG C.IV reconnaissance aircraft.

The J.I was developed as an interim ground attack aircraft, being redesigned from the C.IV to feature armour plating and the more powerful Benz Bz IV piston engine. For engaging ground targets, a pair of 7.92 mm downward-facing (.312 in) LMG 08/15 machine guns were equipped. The aircraft's design was kept as similar to the C.IV as possible to minimise development and production schedules; however, to offset that aircraft's increased weight, it was necessary to add lower wingtip ailerons as well as to reinforce the shock absorbers. A key visual difference between the C.IV and J.I was the latter's angular nose due to the armouring.

An improved model, the J.II, was produced in 1918 during the closing months of the war; it featured aerodynamic improvements and an extended fuselage. Around 609 aircraft, both J.Is and J.IIs, had been produced by the enactment of the Armistice of 11 November 1918 that ended the conflict. The type saw limited use following the war. Multiple J.IIs served the first sustained daily passenger aeroplane service in the world, between the German cities of Berlin and Weimar, launched by Deutsche Luft-Reederei on 5 February 1919.

== Design and development ==
During 1917, Germany undertook the formation and equipping of several Infanterie-Flieger units; military planners was decided that an interim aircraft would be needed for these units prior to the arrival of adequate numbers of purpose-built aircraft such as the Junkers J.I. The AEG J.I, being a relatively straightforward development of the AEG C.IV reconnaissance aircraft, could be hastily put into production and thus was deemed suitable for fulfilling this role. The principal changes between the C.IV and the J.I were the adoption of the more powerful Benz Bz IV in-line piston engine along with an armoured fuselage, the former helping to offset the additional 860 lb of weight of the latter.

In terms of its basic configuration, the J.I was a twin-seat single-engined tractor biplane. Equipped with a conventional landing gear with a tail skid, it had steel tube structure and was mainly covered with fabric. The armour plating, which extended from the aircraft's nose to just aft of the rear cockpit, was roughly 5.1 mm thick; this armouring was not intended to function as structural elements, being instead fixed to various structural members. The J.I's distinctive angular nose is a result of the armouring, which made little concession to shaping or aerodynamic refinement.

Both the pilot and gunner were seated in an open tandem cockpit that was protected with armour. The gunner was provisioned with three weapons, including a pair of 7.92 mm (.312 in) LMG 08/15 machine guns fitted to the floor of the cockpit for use against ground targets, and a single 7.92 mm (.312 in) Parabellum MG14 machine gun on a rotatable mounting to provide flexible defensive fire. Ammunition was belt-fed from a relatively large supply drum, while aiming was achieved via a rudimentary sight in the form of a circular hole in the forward-righthand side of the cockpit. Typically there was no forward-firing armament as the aircraft was intended to focus on strafing troops on the ground rather than engage in aerial combat; however, various non-standard armaments would often be fitted in the field.

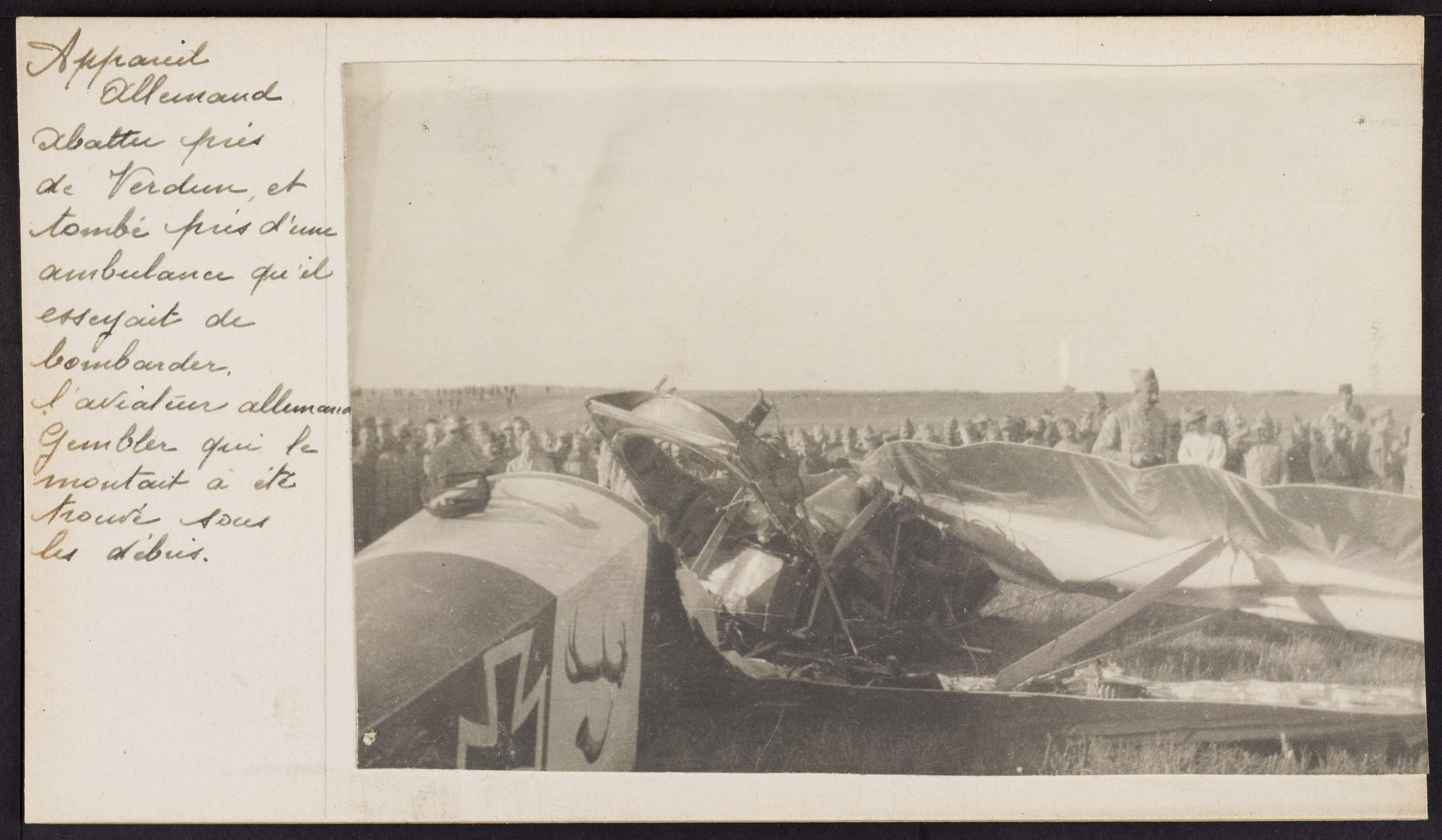
Crashed German AEG J.I aeroplane at Verdun France; 7-10-1917 Albrecht Gembler & Fritz Sagner FA(A) 254 downed near Ville-sur- Cousances by Sgt. (Felix) Gohier (Escadrille N. 85).

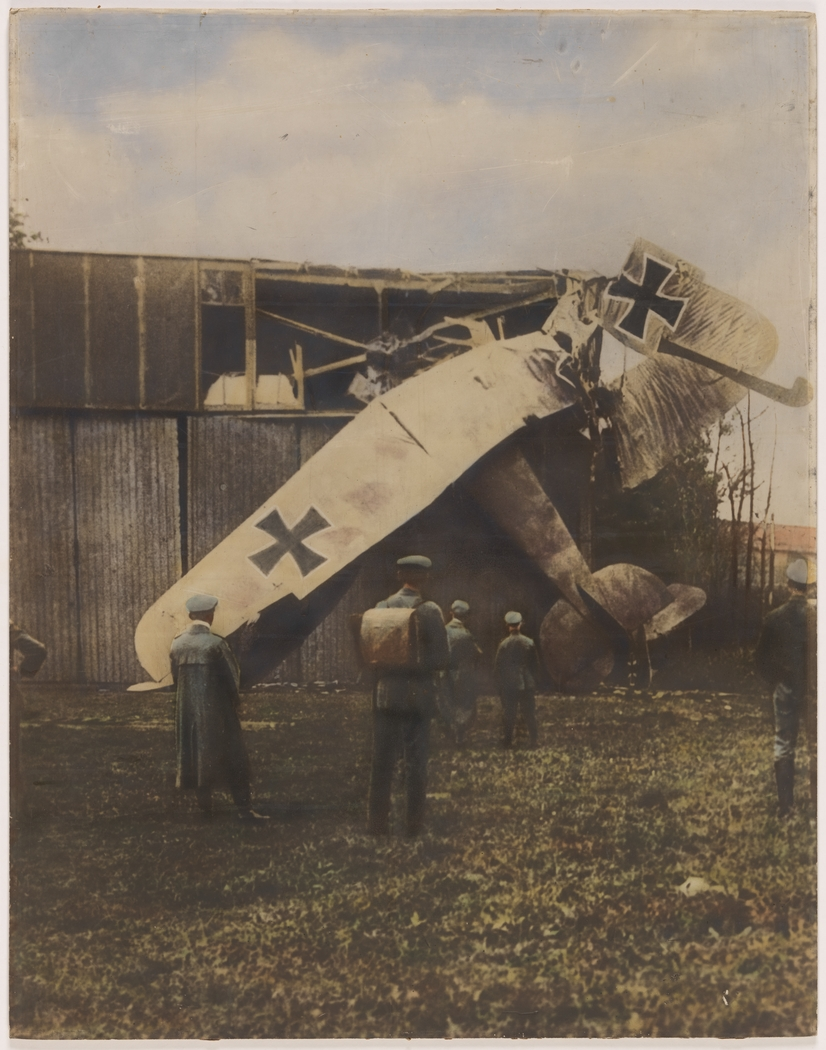
crashed AEG G.IV

While the prototype J.I had been equipped with an identical wing to that of the C.IV, it was determined that the greater weight of the aircraft necessitated greater lateral control; this was resolved with minimal redesign work to the overall wing via the addition of ailerons at the outer parts of the lower wing. Other modifications included the reinforcement of the shock absorbers to appropriately cope with the additional weight. Otherwise, conscious efforts were made to avoid unnecessary design changes from the C.IV.

During 1918, a refined version of the J.I, designated J.II, was developed. While this aircraft differed little in terms of structure from the J.I, it featured considerable changes in terms of its aerodynamics. All of the flight control surfaces, other than the lower ailerons, were redesigned; the incorporation of overhanging horn balances made the two models visually distinct from one another. Another visible change was the extension of the rear fuselage; other changes included the fitting of an enlarged fin to improve directional stability and a repositioned aileron link strut.

By the signing of the Armistice of 11 November 1918, roughly 609 aircraft, both J.Is and J.IIs, had been produced.

The type saw use for several years following the end of the conflict. Multiple J.IIs served the first sustained daily passenger aeroplane service in the world, between the German cities of Berlin and Weimar, flown by Deutsche Luft-Reederei. This route began on 5 February 1919. Early commercial J.IIs retained open cockpits, but modified versions with enclosed cabins for the two passengers were quickly produced and replaced them.

== Variants ==
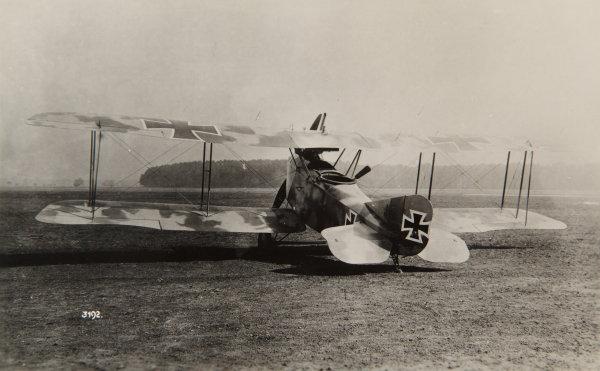
AEG J.I rear

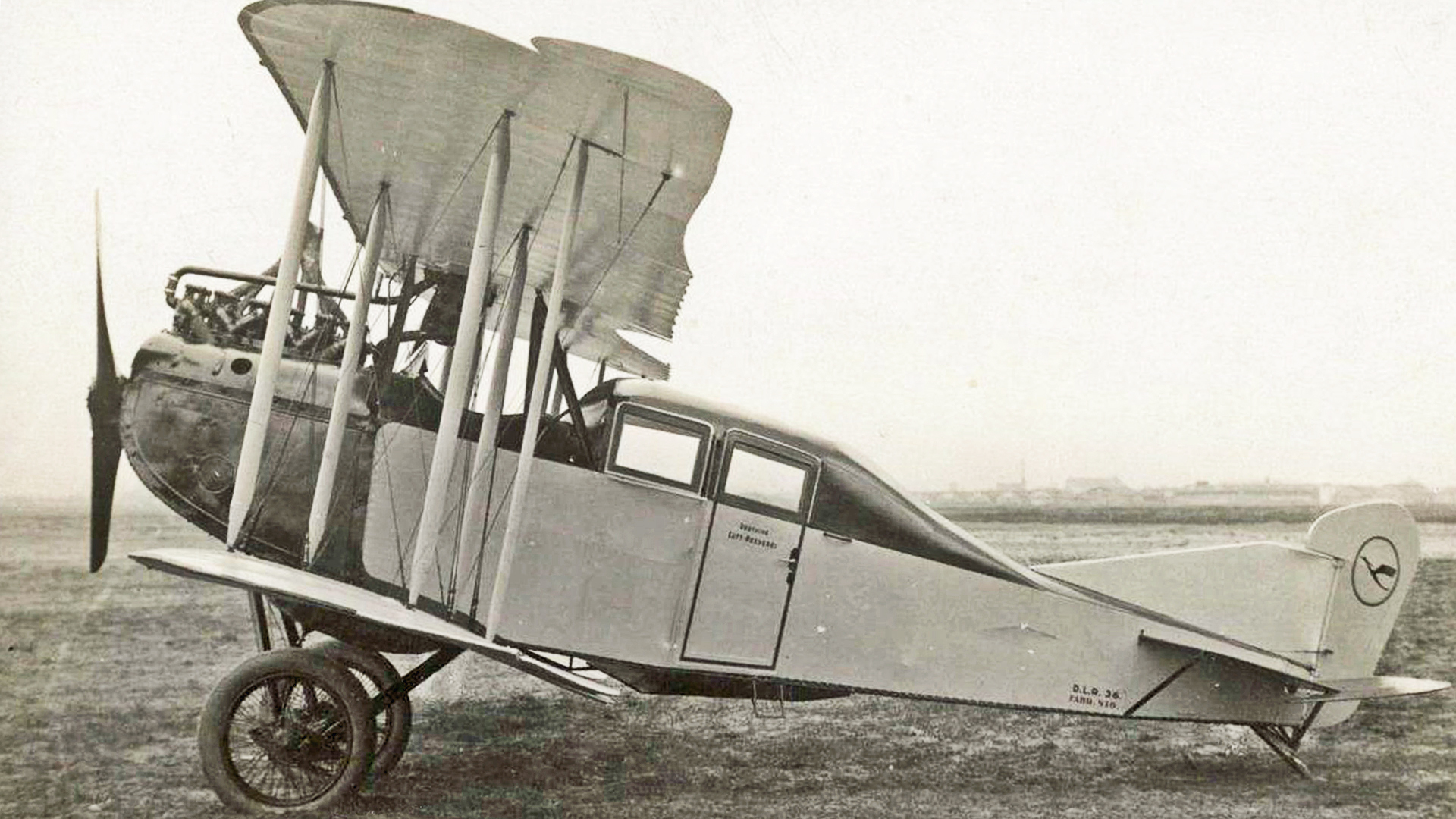
AEG J.II cabin version with the German airline Deutsche Luft-Reederei in 1919

AEG J.I
An armoured version of the AEG C.IV fitted with downward pointing machine guns in the floor of the rear cockpit for ground strafing and a defensive hand-aimed machine-gun in the observers cockpit.
AEG J.Ia
The J.Ia version featured aileron controls on the lower wings, in addition to the upper.
AEG J.II
Structurally similar to the J.I, outfitted with ailerons aerodynamically balanced by large horn extensions at the wing-tips, increased fin area to improve directional stability and a re-located aileron link strut.

== Operators ==
German Empire

- Luftstreitkräfte
- Deutsche Luft-Reederei

== Specifications (AEG J.I) ==
Data from German Aircraft of the First World War

General characteristics

- Crew: 2
- Length: 7.2 m (23 ft 7 in)
- Wingspan: 13.46 m (44 ft 2 in)
- Height: 3.35 m (11 ft 0 in)
- Wing area: 33.18 m^{2} (357.1 sq ft)
- Empty weight: 1,455 kg (3,208 lb)
- Powerplant: 1 × Benz Bz IV six-cylinder water-cooled in-line piston engine, 149 kW (200 hp)

Performance

- Maximum speed: 150 km/h (93 mph, 81 kn)
- Range: 375 km (233 mi, 202 nmi)
- Endurance: 2.5hr
- Service ceiling: 4,500 m (14,800 ft)
- Rate of climb: 2.78 m/s (547 ft/min)
- Time to altitude: 1,000m in six minutes

Armament

- Guns: * up to 6 × 7.92 mm (.312 in) fixed, downwards-firing LMG 08/15 machine guns (standard fit of 2)
- 1 × 7.92 mm (.312 in) Parabellum MG14 in rear cockpit

== See also ==
Related development

- AEG C.IV

Aircraft of comparable role, configuration, and era

- Albatros J.I
- Albatros J.II
- Junkers J.I

Related lists

- List of military aircraft of Germany

== Bibliography ==
- Gray, Peter; Thetford, Owen (1970). German Aircraft of the First World War (2nd ed.). London, UK: Putnam. ISBN 0-370-00103-6.
- Herris, Jack (2012). German Armored Warplanes of WWI: A Centennial Perspective of Great War Airplanes. Great War Aviation Centennial Series. Vol. 4. Charleston, South Carolina, US: Aeronaut Books. ISBN 978-1-935881-11-7.
- Probably Villeselve, France. 19 April 1918. The tangled wreckage of a crashed AEG J I aircraft of a German squadron, probably Bayrische Flieger Abteilung 287 (Bavarian Flying Section 287), in a field. Leutnant Major Vizefeldwebel Benz was killed in this crash.
