= Albatros C.XII =

1917 German reconnaissance aircraft

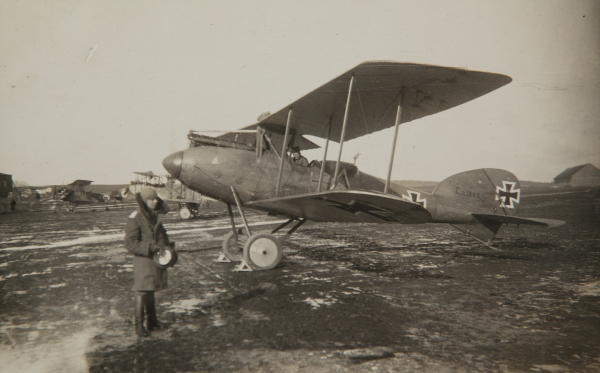

General information
- Type: Reconnaissance aircraft
- Manufacturer: Albatros Flugzeugwerke
- Primary user: Germany

The Albatros C.XII was a military reconnaissance aircraft designed and produced by the German aircraft manufacturer Albatros Flugzeugwerke.

It was developed as a successor to the Albatros C.X. The C.XII differed markedly from previous Albatros C-type aircraft by adopting an elliptical-section fuselage similar to that of the Albatros D.V. The C.XII also featured a tailplane of reduced area, but it retained the wings of the earlier C.X. The C.X entered service with the Luftstreitkräfte during 1918 and saw active combat during the final months of the First World War. Despite the aerodynamic advantages, there was no significant performance increase achieved over the C.X. Examples remained in service until the end of the conflict.

== Development ==
The Albatross C.XII originated in the desire within Albatros to produce an aircraft superior to its C.X. The company's design team opted to incorporate the latest advances from contemporary single-seat fighter aircraft, particularly in the practice of streamlining. As a result of this focus, the C.XII was a relatively elegant aircraft for a twin-seater of the era; however, despite its well-proportioned and aesthetically pleasing appearance, the refined fuselage did not contribute to any meaningful improvement in performance. The fuselage was an all-new aspect of the design, which had a natural flow from the airscrew through to the tail unit, which was met via Albatros' distinctive horizontal knife-edge design. The surface area of the fuselage's keel was intentionally minimised.

The structural elements of the C.XII's fuselage were largely reminiscent of the C.X, comprising longerons and formers, the latter having an elliptical cross-section and being composed of plywood. A combination of pinning and screwing were used to connect the covering with the framework in compact rectangular sections which permitted it to follow the contours of the fuselage. Access to the nose-mounted Mercedes D.IVa engine, another feature carried over from the C.X, was easily achievable via metal access panels. The new fuselage design necessitated the redesigning of the undercarriage, the forward struts being elongated considerably. In spite of this change, the basic structural design of the undercarriage, which comprised V-section steel tubing and elastic shock absorbers, was akin to that of the C.X.

To ensure sufficient directional stability during flight, a small plywood-skinned under-fin was present in the vertical tail surfaces; it also supported the tailskid. The surface area of the fixed tailplane was smaller than that of the C.X to enhance fore and aft sensitivity. This tailplane was braced using steel struts to the vertical fin and had a plywood covering. A fabric covering and steel tube framing was used for both the rudder and the horn-balanced elevator. The wings were largely unchanged from those of the C.X, both in shape and construction method. The aerofoil radiator arrangement was also retained.

== Operational history ==
The Albatros C.XII only became available to the Luftstreitkräfte available in quantity during 1918, and thus was only used in actual combat for under a year prior to the Armistice of 11 November 1918 that ended the conflict.

== Operators ==
German Empire

- Luftstreitkräfte

Poland

- Polish Air Force (postwar)

Free City of Danzig

- Police air squadron (postwar)

== Specifications (C.XII) ==
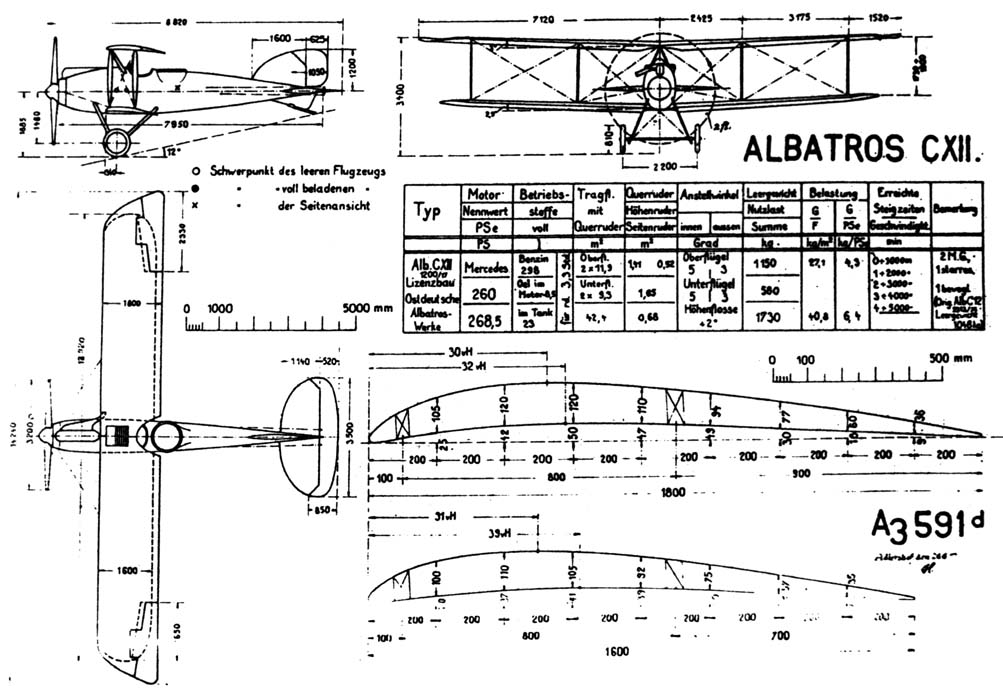
Albatros C.XII Baubeschreibung drawing, as issued to IdFlieg

Data from German Aircraft of the First World War

General characteristics

- Crew: Two (pilot and observer)
- Length: 8.84 m (29 ft 0 in)
- Wingspan: 14.37 m (47 ft 2 in) (OAW = 14.24)
- Height: 3.25 m (10 ft 8 in)
- Wing area: 42.7 m^{2} (459 sq ft)
- Empty weight: 580 kg (1,280 lb)
- Gross weight: 1,061 kg (2,340 lb)
- Powerplant: 1 × Mercedes D.IVa , 190 kW (260 hp)

Performance

- Maximum speed: 178 km/h (110 mph, 96 kn)
- Endurance: Four hours and 20 minutes
- Service ceiling: 5,640 m (18,500 ft)
- Rate of climb: 4.2 m/s (820 ft/min)

Armament

- 1 × forward-firing 7.92 mm (.312 in) Spandau LMG 08/15 machine gun
- 1 × 7.92 mm (.312 in) Parabellum MG14 machine gun for observer
