= Junkers J.I =

1917 attack aircraft by Junkers

J.I
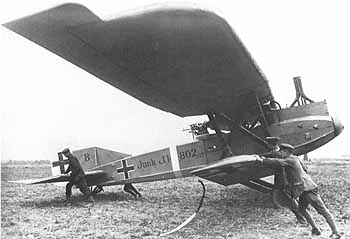

General information
- Type: Observation and liaison aircraft
- Manufacturer: Junkers
- Designer: Otto Mader
- Primary user: Luftstreitkräfte
- Number built: 227

History
- Introduction date: 1917
- First flight: 28 January 1917
- Retired: 1919

The Junkers J.I (manufacturer's name J 4) was a German "J-class" armored sesquiplane of World War I, developed for low-level ground attack, observation and army cooperation. It is especially noteworthy as being the first all-metal aircraft to enter mass production; the aircraft's metal construction and heavy armour was a shield against small arms fire over the battlefield.

== Design ==
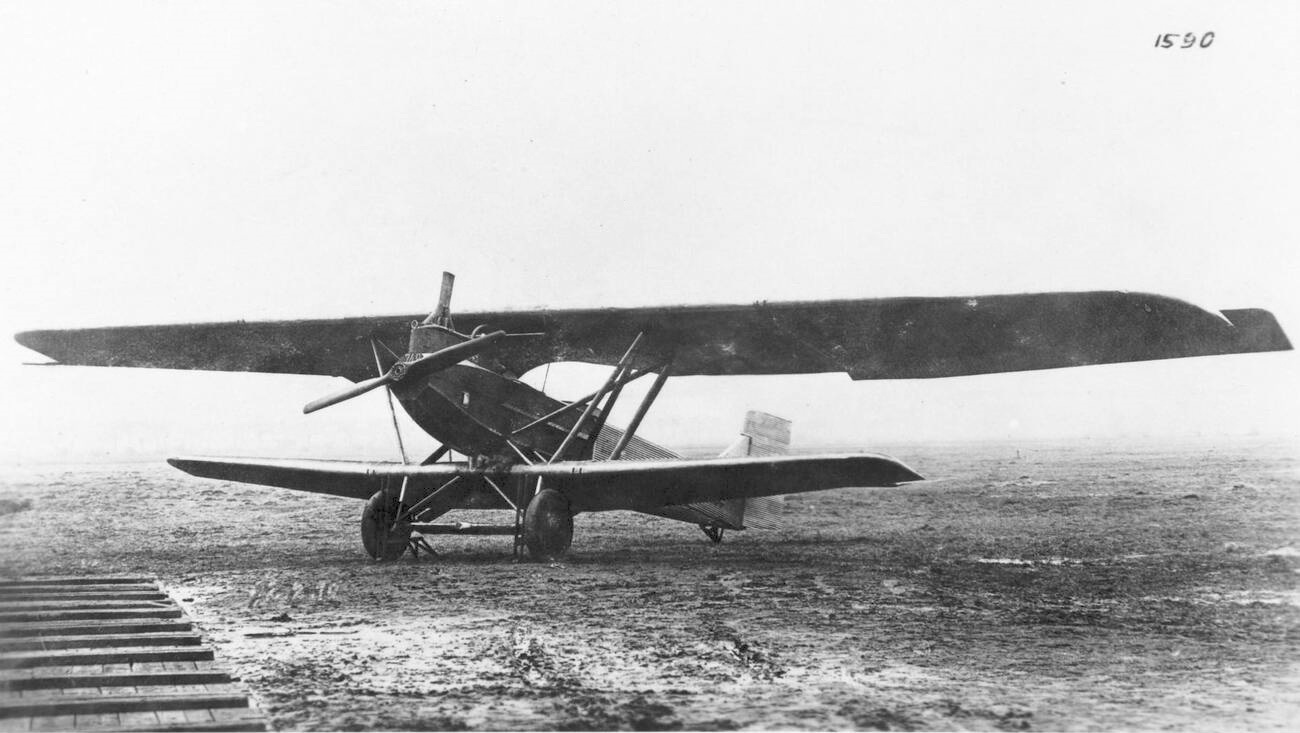
Junkers J.I showing its cantilever sesquiplane configuration

It was an extremely advanced design for the period, with a single-unit steel "bathtub" running from just behind the propeller to the rear crew position acting as armour, the main fuselage structure and engine mounting in one unit. Engine access was provided by armored steel panels, one on either side of the nose. The armour was 5 millimetres (0.20 in) thick and weighed 470 kilograms (1,040 lb) and protected the crew, the engine, the fuel tanks and radio equipment. The flight control surfaces were connected to the aircraft's controls by push-rods and bellcranks – not with the usual steel cable control connections of the era as push-rods were less likely to be severed by ground fire.

There was a significant size difference between the upper and lower wings – the upper wing had an area of 35.89 m^{2} (386.3 sq ft), over double the area of the lower wing – 13.68 m^{2} (147.3 sq ft). This is a form of biplane known as a sesquiplane.

The aircraft had two fuel tanks with a capacity of around 120 litres (32 US gal). The main tank (divided in two for redundancy) was supplemented by a smaller, 30-litre (7.9 US gal) gravity tank. This was intended to supply fuel to the engine by gravity feed in the event of an engine fuel pump failure; it contained enough fuel for thirty minutes on full power. There was a manual fuel pump for use when the gravity tank was empty.

The aircraft could be separated into its main components: wings, fuselage, undercarriage and tail, to make it easier to transport by rail or road. A ground crew of six to eight could reassemble the aircraft and have it ready for flight within four to six hours. The wings were covered with 0.19-millimetre-thick (0.0075 in) aluminium skin which could be easily dented; great care had to be taken when handling the aircraft on the ground.

== Operational history ==
The J.I was well liked by its crews, although its ponderous handling earned it the nickname "furniture van". The aircraft first entered front service in August 1917. They were used on the Western Front during the German spring offensive of 1918.

The aircraft could be fitted with two downward-firing machine guns for ground attack but they were found to be of limited use because of the difficulty of aiming them. The J-Is were mainly used for army co-operation and low-level reconnaissance. They were also used for dropping ammunition and rations on outposts that could not be easily supplied by other means.

The production at Junkers works was quite slow because of poor organization and only 227 J.Is were manufactured before production ceased in January 1919. At least one was lost to ground fire, shot down by a French anti-aircraft machine-gun firing armour-piercing rounds, although this was apparently an isolated event as some sources claim none were lost in combat. Some were lost in landing accidents and other mishaps.

== Operators ==
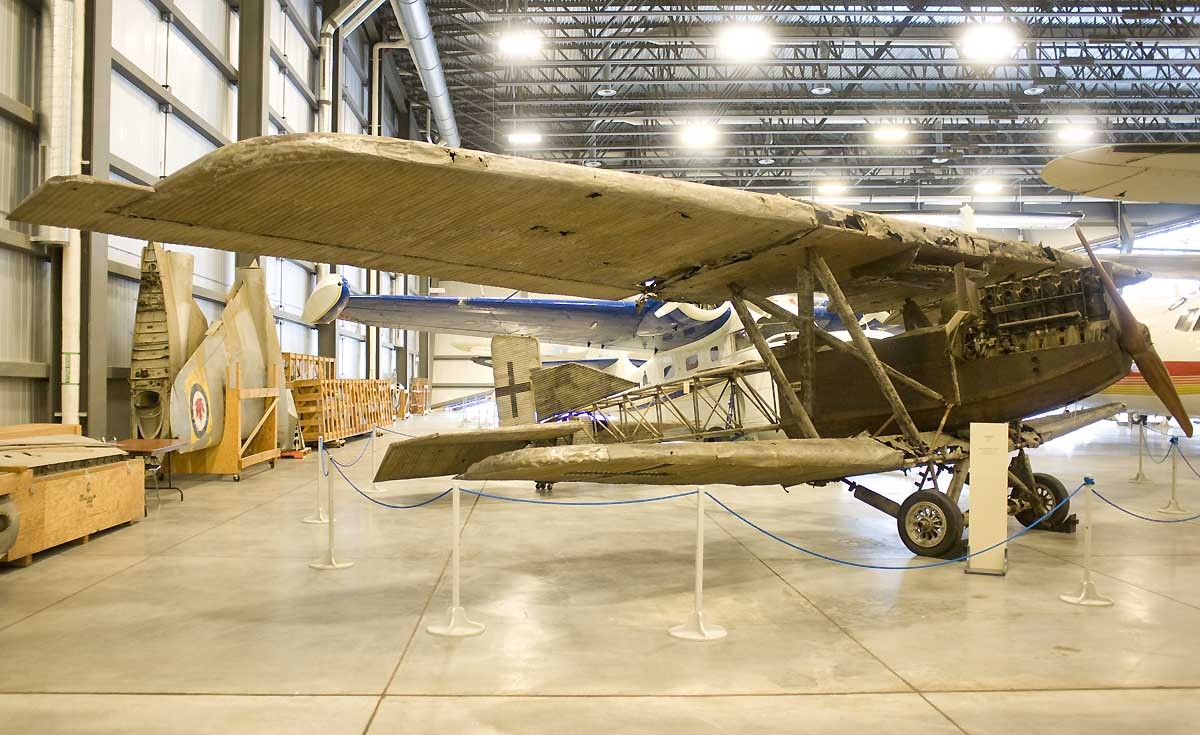
Surviving example in Canada

German Empire

- Luftstreitkräfte

== Surviving aircraft ==
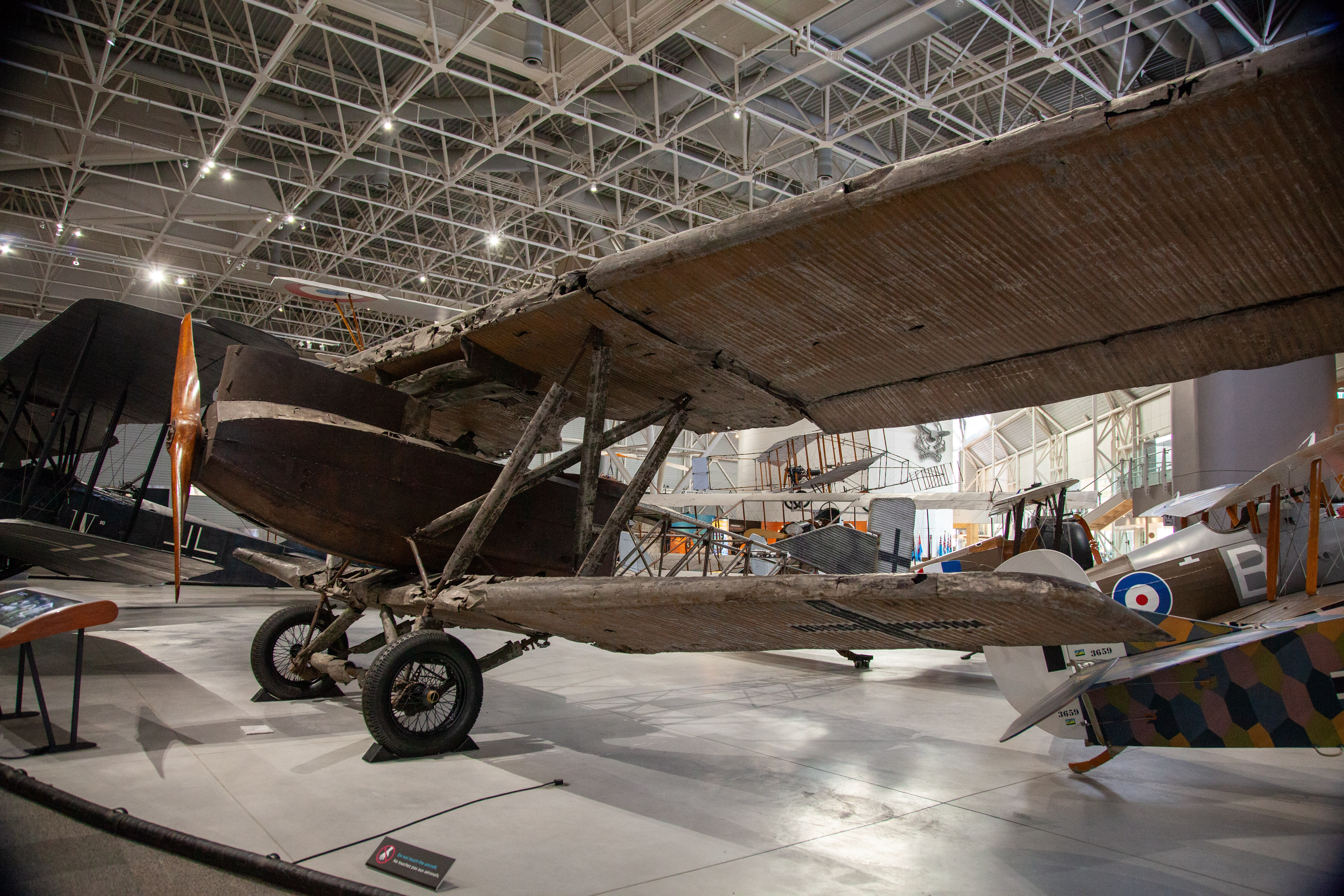
Surviving example in Canada with the engine cowling installed

Only one relatively complete aircraft survived, bearing German military serial number J.I 586/18. It is preserved at the Canada Aviation and Space Museum in Ottawa, Ontario, Canada. This aircraft, construction number 252, was manufactured in 1918 and was a war trophy that was sent to Canada in 1919. It was in the possession of the Canadian War Museum before being transferred to the Canada Aviation and Space Museum in 1969.

A Junkers J.I fuselage exists at the Italian Air Force Museum in Vigna di Valle. This aircraft was previously exhibited at the Leonardo da Vinci Museum at Milano and was restored at the Deutsche Technikmuseum Berlin between 2005 and 2010.

A flyable Junkers J.I replica is under construction in Hungary.

== Specifications ==
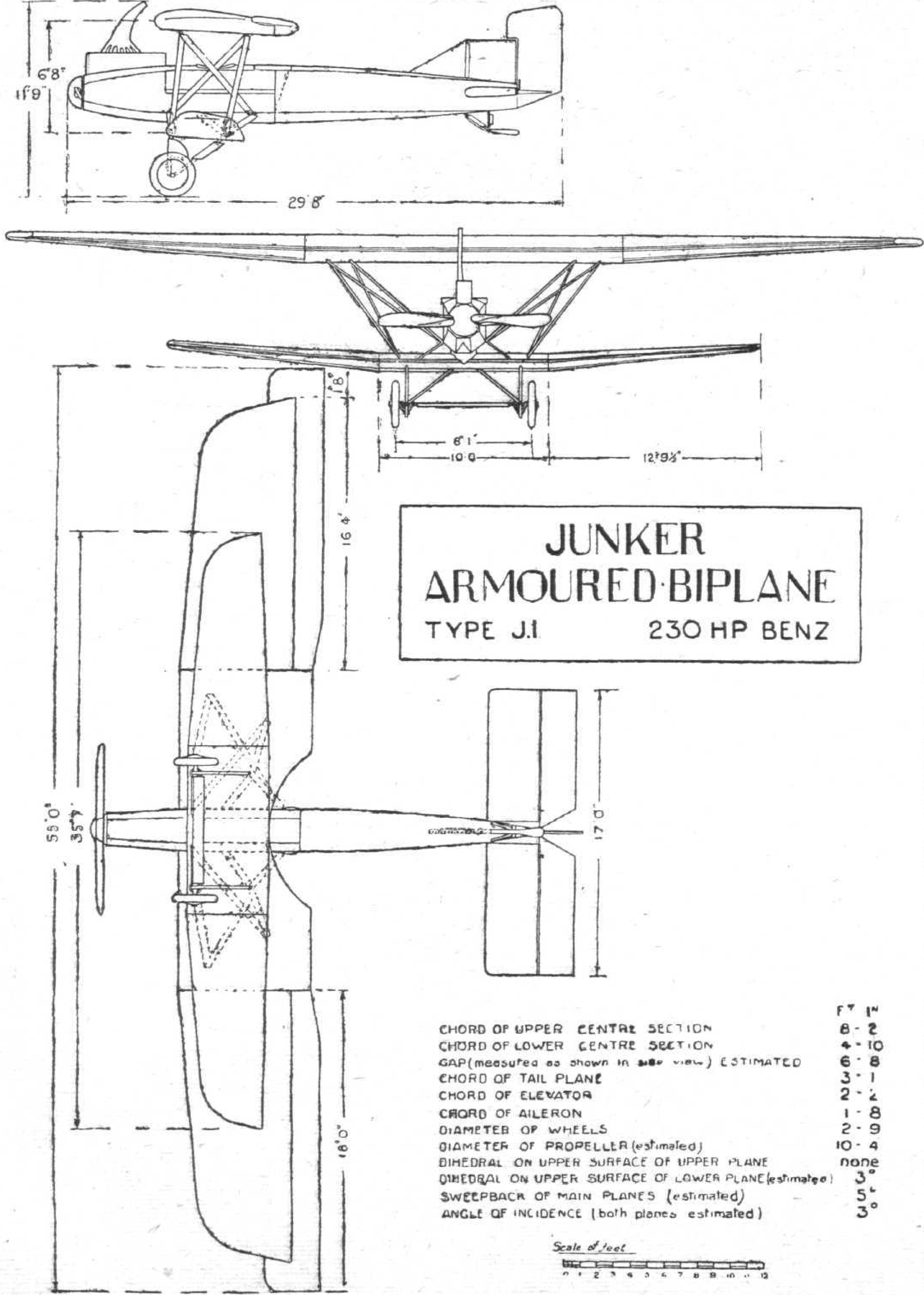
Contemporary three-view drawing of Junkers J.I

General characteristics

- Crew: Two, pilot and observer
- Length: 9.1 m (29 ft 10 in)
- Wingspan: 16.00 m (52 ft 6 in)
- Height: 3.4 m (11 ft 2 in)
- Wing area: 49.4 m^{2} (531 sq ft)
- Empty weight: 1,766 kg (3,893 lb)
- Gross weight: 2,140 kg (4,718 lb)
- Powerplant: 1 × Benz Bz.IV , 149 kW (200 hp)

Performance

- Maximum speed: 155 km/h (97 mph, 84 kn)
- Range: 310 km (193 mi, 168 nmi)
- Service ceiling: 4,000 m (13,000 ft)

Armament

- 1 × flexible 7.92 mm (0.312 in) Parabellum MG14 machine gun

== See also ==
- Junkers

Aircraft of comparable role, configuration, and era

- AEG J.I
- AEG J.II
- Albatros J.I
- Albatros J.II
