= Daimler L21 =

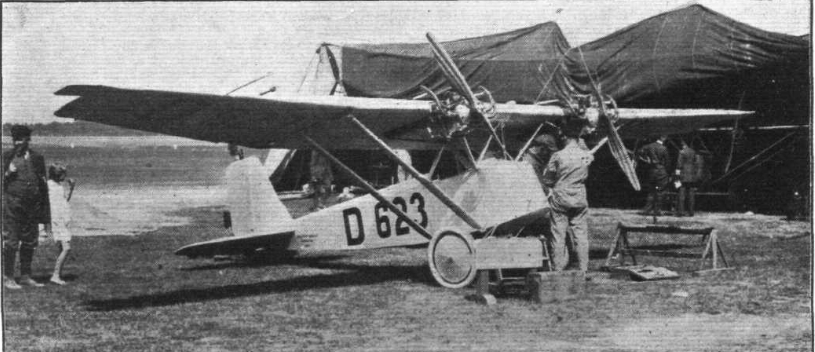
- The Class A 1925 Round Germany Contest winner

General information
- Type: Single seat light aircraft
- National origin: Germany
- Manufacturer: Daimler aircraft
- Designer: Hanns Klemm
- Number built: 2

History
- First flight: 1925

The Daimler L21 or Daimler-Klemm L21 was a light twin engined, single seat, parasol winged sports aircraft built in Germany. It was the winner in the lowest powered class of the Round Germany Flight contest of 1925.

== Design and development ==
The 1925 Round Germany Flight involved five circuits over a total distance of over 5,250 km (3,262 mi). Competing aircraft were classified by total engine power, the lowest powered group having less than 40 hp (30 kW). Three Daimler aircraft were in this group, all designed by Hanns Klemm, two single engined L20s and the L21. They were all powered by the new Mercedes F7502 light aircraft engine which Klemm had championed and Ferdinand Porsche designed. This unit produced 19 hp (14 kW), so the twin engined L21 just qualified within the lowest power group.

The L21 had a parasol wing constructed in three pieces around two wooden spars. The outer panels were tapered, with sweep only on their trailing edges. On its first flight and tests the centre panel was also tapered and the overall span was 8.80 m (28 ft 10 in) but these early flights revealed an instability around the longitudinal axis. This was cured by extending the centre section span, making it just under half the new overall span of 10.80 m (35 ft 5 in) and giving it a rectangular plan. The wing was plywood covered from the forward spar to the leading edge, forming a torsion resisting box, and had internal wire bracing. An unusual feature that the L21 shared with the L20 and the earlier L15 was the supplementation of conventional ailerons with short chord tip flaps, each with an area of 0.13 m^{2} (1.4 sq ft), rotating on axes toward the leading edge of the wing and connected to the ailerons by rods and cranks. Both before and after the wing extension lift struts ran from the lower fuselage longerons to the end of the centre section, taking them well outside the engines on the final version. The L21's engines were wing mounted just outside the cabane struts, each cylinder with a tall, ram's horn exhaust discharging over the wing. They were fed from a tank in the central part of the wing.

The flat sided, short nosed fuselage of the L21 was a wooden structure, partly covered with stress bearing ply and with wire bracing and fabric covering elsewhere. The single seat, open cockpit was accessed through a port side door. The tail surfaces were fabric covered over a wooden structure, apart from the ply reinforced leading edge of the tailplane; they were straight edged and square topped. The tailplane was set at mid-fuselage height and the rudder, hinged at the elevator trailing edge, extended down to the keel.

The L21 originally had a fixed undercarriage with solid plywood wheel without tyres, like those on the L15, mounted on an axle which passed through the fuselage on rubber blocks. To absorb vibrations when the engines were at full power for take-off, these wheels were then fitted with tyres but the final undercarriage arrangement had rubber tyred, spoked wheels on a single, faired, rubber sprung axle held below the fuselage by a pair of very short V struts to the lower longerons on each side.

The L21 first flight was probably in the spring of 1925. Two were built but, despite its success at the Round Germany contest, it was not further developed or produced. One result of the low engine power which limited its appeal was that with one engine out it could not maintain altitude.

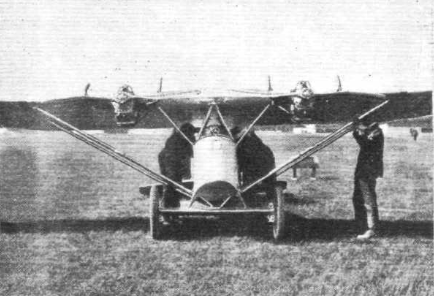
Head-on view of the L21

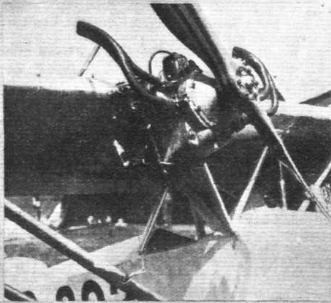
Mercedes engine installation

== Operational history ==
Flown by Bruno Loerzer, the L21 was the Class A winner in the Round Germany contest in June 1925. The low powered aircraft all proved much less reliable than those in the higher power classes but he covered 3,300 km (2,051 mi), about 63% of the total distance, flown between 31 May and 9 June.. Because of engine changes he was accredited with flying only 3,080 km (1,914 mi). The prize was 25,000 Goldmarks (worth £1,250 in 1925). The two L20s came second and third and won another 25,000 Goldmark between them, all three aircraft also contributing to the award of first prize in the contest between German-engined aircraft to Mercedes.

The fuselage of the winner, D-623 hung in Klemm's factory at Böblingen Airport until destroyed by bombing in World War II.

== Specifications (as flown in the Round Germany Flight) ==
Data from Kens (2011)

General characteristics

- Crew: Two
- Length: 5.40 m (17 ft 9 in)
- Wingspan: 10.80 m (35 ft 5 in)
- Wing area: 13.1 m^{2} (141 sq ft)
- Empty weight: 365 kg (805 lb) approximately
- Gross weight: 475 kg (1,047 lb)
- Powerplant: 2 × Mercedes F7502a air cooled flat twin, geared down, 14 kW (19 hp) each
- Propellers: 2-bladed, 1.85 m (6 ft 1 in) diameter wooden

Performance

- Maximum speed: 130 km/h (81 mph, 70 kn)
- Cruise speed: 110 km/h (68 mph, 59 kn)
- Service ceiling: 3,500 m (11,500 ft)
- Time to altitude: 10 minutes to 1,000 m (3,281 ft)
- Landing speed: about 80 km/h (50 mph)
