= L21 =

L21 may refer to:

== Vehicles ==
Aircraft

- Albatros L 21, a German biplane bomber
- Daimler L21, a German sports aircraft
- LZ 61 (L 21), an airship of the Imperial German Navy
- Piper L-21 Super Cub, an American aircraft

Ships

- HMS L21, a submarine of the Royal Navy
- HMS Viceroy (L21), a destroyer of the Royal Navy
- INS Guldar (L21), a landing ship of the Indian Navy
- Soviet submarine L-21
- Spanish ship Castillia (L-21)

== Other uses ==
- 60S ribosomal protein L21
- Kete language
- Ribosomal protein L21 leader
- USA-193, an American satellite
