= Klemm Kl 151 =

German prototype light aircraft

Kl 151

General information
- Type: Personnel transport and liaison
- Manufacturer: Klemm
- Designer: Dr. Hanns Klemm and Carl Bucher
- Status: Cancelled
- Number built: 1

History
- First flight: 10 September 1942
- Developed from: Messerschmitt Bf 108

The Klemm Kl 151 was a German prototype light passenger aircraft designed by Dr. Hanns Klemm and chief engineer Carl Bucher during World War II. Only one model was built.

== Development ==
In 1940 Klemm received a request from the Reich Air Ministry (RLM) chief Ernst Udet to begin work on a version of the Messerschmitt Bf 108 Taifun using wood rather than aluminium for the airframe, since the metal was then in short supply.

One of the conditions was that the design of the Bf 108 would be used for the new aircraft. This created substantial difficulties. To speed up the project both the wings and the fuselage were based on already-built Kl 107 components. Since the fuselage was too short, Bucher extended it at the tail with a welded tubular steel framework covered with sheet metal, which also housed the tail landing gear. The wings were widened at the root and moved forward in order to accommodate additional fuel tanks, which replaced the two rear seats.

== Flight tests ==
The prototype Kl 151 V1, designated with the Stammkennzeichen radio code of TB+QK, made its first flight at Böblingen on 10 September 1942, with Klemm's chief pilot Karl Voy at the controls. The aircraft was powered by a 240 Pferdestärke (PS) (236 horsepower, 176 kW) Argus As 10P inverted V8 engine. The planned model Kl 151-B, fitted with a 355 PS (350 hp, 261 kW) Argus As 410 inverted V12 engine was not built.

On 19 February 1943 the V1 prototype was transferred to the Deutsche Versuchsanstalt für Luftfahrt ("German Experimental Institute for Aviation") at Adlershof for testing, which was successfully completed on 1 March 1943.

The fixed undercarriage was a concern to the Luftwaffe, as the Bf 108 had suffered on the rough landing fields of the eastern front. Therefore, the requirement now demanded a robust as well as a retractable undercarriage. In place of the fixed tricycle undercarriage, now the V1 received one in a Y-configuration, with two steel half-shells welded together for the guidance of the shock absorbers on each side.

Further testing continued. Klemm used the aircraft as a personal transport until July 1944, when it was destroyed in an Allied air raid. The Air Ministry transferred the incomplete V2 prototype, and responsibility for further development and production, over to the Czech company Zlin. The problems caused by the demand for a retractable landing gear were finally solved, but the aircraft was never completed, nor put into full production.

After the war a revival of the project was considered, however Klemm instead decided on the Kl 107A.

== Specifications (Kl 151 V1) ==
Data from

General characteristics

- Crew: 1
- Capacity: 3 passengers
- Length: 9.30 m (30 ft 6 in)
- Wingspan: 12.40 m (40 ft 8 in)
- Height: 2.20 m (7 ft 3 in)
- Wing area: 21.60 m^{2} (232.5 sq ft)
- Empty weight: 800 kg (1,764 lb)
- Gross weight: 1,500 kg (3,307 lb)
- Powerplant: 1 × Argus As 10P V-8 air-cooled, 90° inverted piston engine, 147 kW (197 hp)

Performance

- Maximum speed: 280 km/h (170 mph, 150 kn)
- Range: 1,000 km (620 mi, 540 nmi)

== Notes and references ==
- Nĕmeček, Václav (1996). "Letadla 39–45: Klemm Kl 151". Letectví + Kosmonautika (in Czech). Vol. LXXII, no. 19. p. 1239. ISSN 0024-1156.
- Nowarra, Heinz J. (1993). Die Deutsche Luftruestung 1933–1945 Vol.3 – Flugzeugtypen Henschel-Messerschmitt (in German). Koblenz: Bernard & Graefe Verlag. ISBN 978-3-7637-5467-0.

== See also ==
Related development

- Messerschmitt Bf 108

Related lists

- List of German aircraft projects, 1939–45
- List of military aircraft of Germany
- List of World War II military aircraft of Germany
