= Daimler CL.I =

German WWI fighter aircraft

General information
- Type: Fighter
- National origin: Germany
- Manufacturer: Daimler
- Designer: Hanns Klemm
- Number built: 1

History
- First flight: 1917

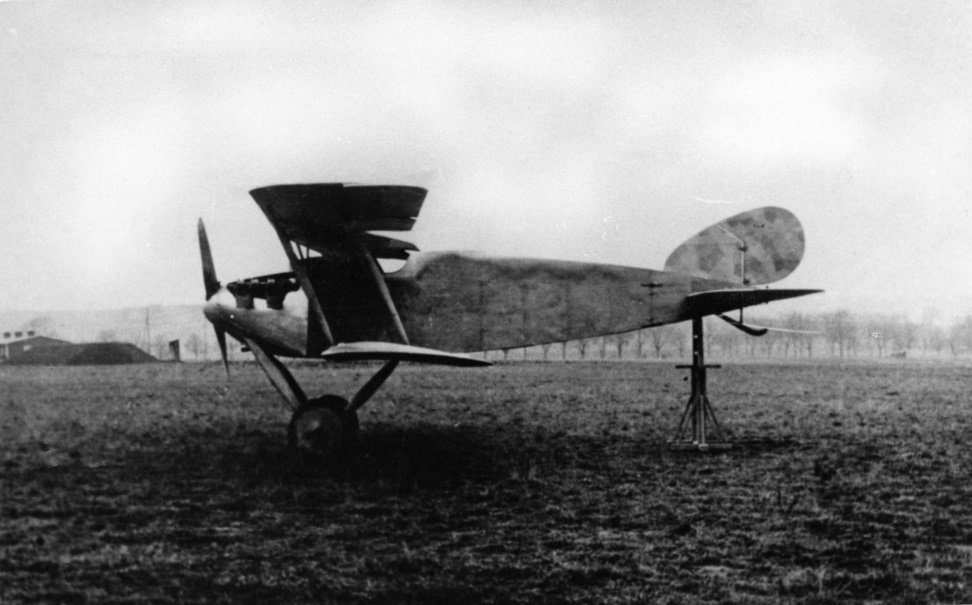
The Daimler L8 photographed in 1918

The Daimler CL.I was a prototype two-seat fighter built in Germany during World War I.

== Design and development ==
The CL.I was built by the Daimler Motorengesellschaft Werke with the internal designation L8. It first flew in 1917 but did not enter production, although in 1919, it was marketed for export to the Chilean Air Force.

== Specifications ==
Data from

General characteristics

- Crew: 2
- Length: 7.45 m (24 ft 5 in)
- Wingspan: 11.82 m (38 ft 9 in)
- Height: 2.95 m (9 ft 8 in)
- Wing area: 31.5 m^{2} (339 sq ft)
- Empty weight: 820 kg (1,808 lb)
- Gross weight: 1,230 kg (2,712 lb)
- Powerplant: 1 × Daimler D.IIIb V-8 water-cooled piston engine, 138 kW (185 hp)
- Propellers: 2-bladed fixed pitch propeller

Performance

- Maximum speed: 150 km/h (93 mph, 81 kn)
- Cruise speed: 135 km/h (84 mph, 73 kn)
- Endurance: 4 hours

Armament

- Guns: 1 x 7.92 mm (0.312 in) LMG 08/15 machine gun, with one7.92 mm (0.312 in) Parabellum MG14 machine gun on a flexible mount in the rear caockpit
