= Bölkow Bo 207 =

Light single engine aircraft developed in West Germany in the 1960s

Bo 207
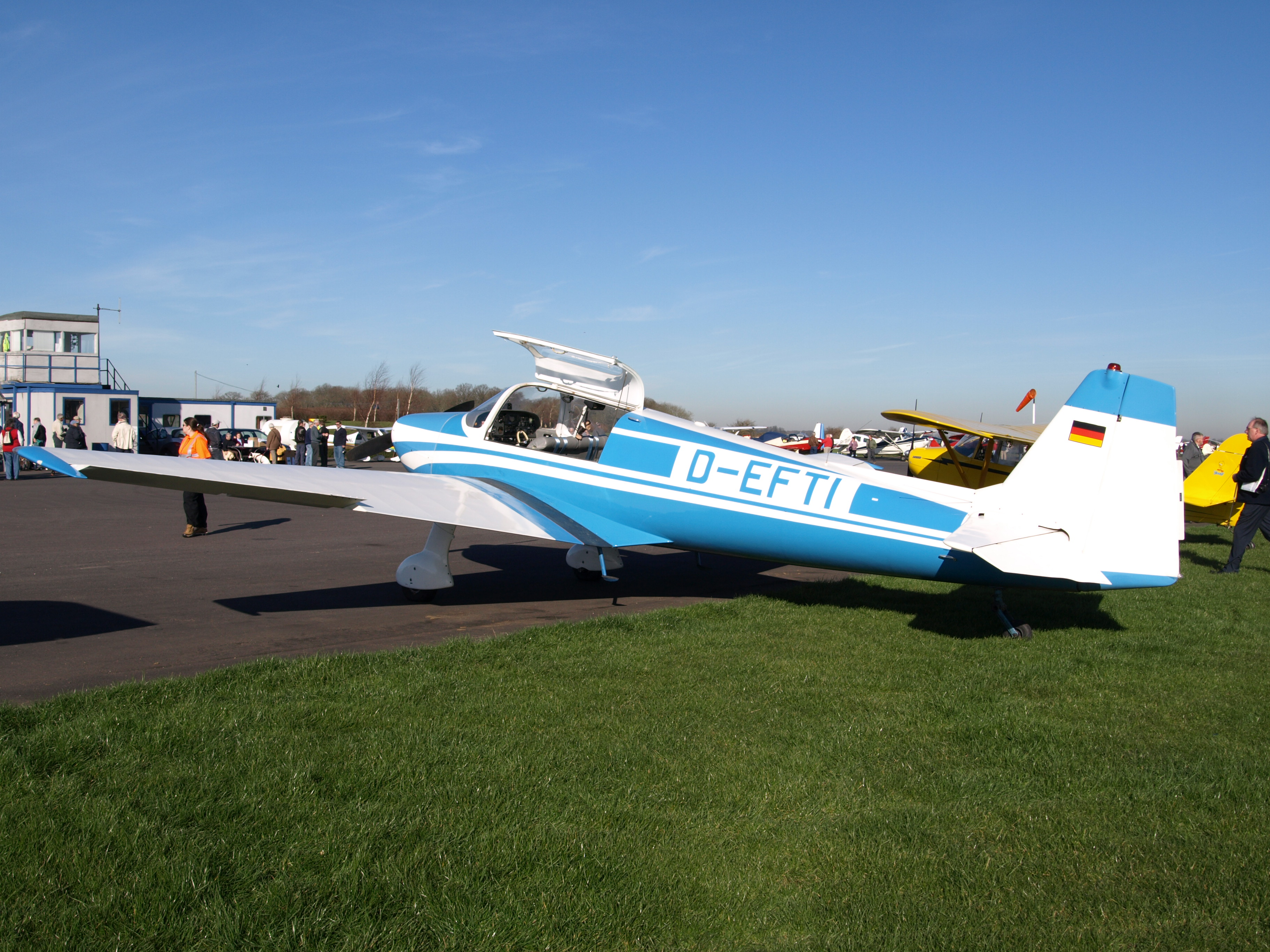

General information
- Type: Civil utility aircraft
- National origin: West Germany
- Manufacturer: Bölkow
- Number built: 92

History
- Manufactured: 1961–1963
- First flight: 10 December 1960

The Bölkow Bo 207 was a four-seat light aircraft built in West Germany in the early 1960s, a development of the Klemm Kl 107 built during World War II.

== Design and development ==
The Bo 207 is a wood construction, single-engined, cantilever low-wing cabin monoplane with a conventional landing gear with a tail wheel. The aircraft is powered by a Lycoming O-360 four-cylinder, direct-drive, horizontally opposed, air-cooled, piston engine.

Bölkow had built the two and three-seat Kl 107 and developed a four-seat variant, at first designated the Kl 107D. The low-wing cabin monoplane had a re-designed cockpit and canopy and a larger tail. The two prototype Kl 107Ds were built at Nabern and the first flew on 10 October 1960. With the change of name of the company to Bolkow and the move to new factory at Laupheim production of the new variant was started at the new factory. In May 1961 the design was re-designated the Bolkow F.207 but by July 1961 it was re-designated again as the Bolkow BO 207.

The first of 90 production aircraft built at Laupheim was flown on 24 May 1961 and production continued until 1963. A number of aircraft remained unsold and the last aircraft although built in 1963 did not fly until 1 April 1966. One aircraft was built with tricycle landing gear, and designated BO 217B or sometimes known as the BO 214 but it was fitted with a conventional landing gear before it was sold.

== Variants ==
Kl 107D
Two prototypes later re-designated F.207 and then BO 207. V-1 prototype modified as the BO 207T.
BO 207
Production aircraft, 90 built.
BO 207B
One 207 temporary modified with a tricycle landing gear, also known as the BO 214.
BO 207T
Prototype V-1 modified as a trainer with reduced weight.

== Specifications (Bo 207) ==
Data from Jane's All The World's Aircraft 1965-66.

General characteristics

- Crew: 1
- Capacity: 3 passengers
- Length: 8.30 m (27 ft 3 in)
- Wingspan: 10.81 m (35 ft 6 in)
- Height: 2.25 m (7 ft 5 in)
- Wing area: 15.40 m^{2} (165.8 sq ft)
- Aspect ratio: 7.6:1
- Airfoil: NACA 23018 at root, NACA 23012 at tip
- Empty weight: 715 kg (1,576 lb)
- Max takeoff weight: 1,200 kg (2,646 lb)
- Fuel capacity: 190 L (50 US gal; 42 imp gal)
- Powerplant: 1 × Lycoming O-360-A1A air-cooled flat-four engine, 130 kW (180 hp)

Performance

- Maximum speed: 255 km/h (158 mph, 138 kn) at sea level
- Cruise speed: 200 km/h (120 mph, 110 kn) (econ cruise)
- Stall speed: 82 km/h (51 mph, 44 kn)
- Never exceed speed: 340 km/h (210 mph, 180 kn)
- Range: 1,250 km (780 mi, 670 nmi)
- Service ceiling: 4,300 m (14,100 ft)
- Rate of climb: 3.6 m/s (700 ft/min)
- Takeoff distance to 15 m (50 ft): 480 m (1,570 ft)
- Landing distance from 15 m (50 ft): 460 m (1,510 ft)

== See also ==
Related development

- Klemm Kl 107
