= Daimler L20 =

Daimler L.20
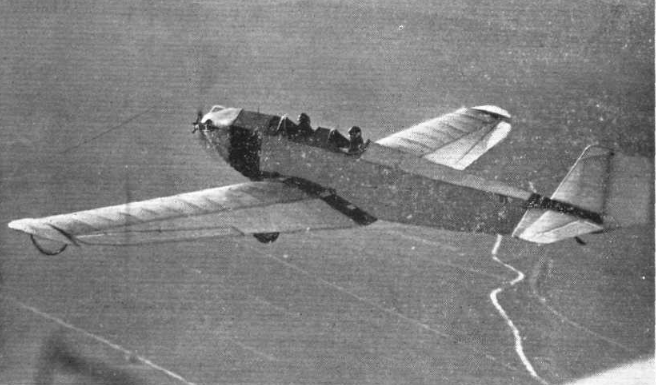

General information
- Type: Two-seat light aircraft
- National origin: Germany
- Manufacturer: Daimler aircraft and Klemm Flugzeugebau
- Designer: Hanns Klemm

History
- First flight: c.1924
- Variant: Klemm L.25

The Daimler L20, later known as the Klemm-Daimler L20, was one of the first light aircraft to be built in significant numbers. A two-seater with an engine of only 20 hp (15 kW), it demonstrated the ability of a small aircraft to cope with flights over the Alps in winter and to make transcontinental journeys of over 36,000 km.

== Design and development ==
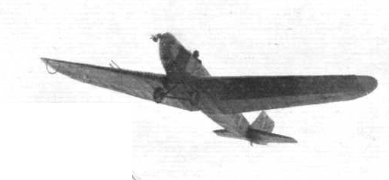

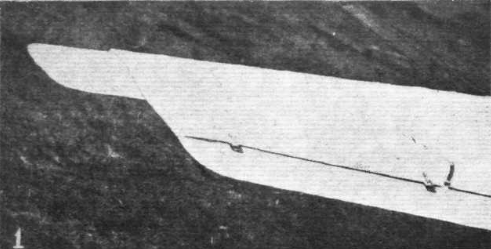
Wingtip, aileron-linked "flap" on early L20

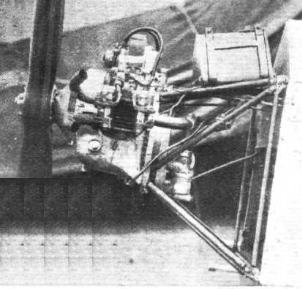
The Mercedes F7502 engine installation

Hans Klemm's first light aircraft was the Daimler L15 and the L20 had much in common with it. Both were cantilever monoplanes with twin open, tandem cockpits and engines of very low power. The L20's low wing distinguished it from its predecessor and had the advantage of providing a low centre of gravity and better view during the landing approach as well as better protection for occupants in case of crash landings. The low-set wing also allowed a shorter undercarriage on the L20, which was otherwise like that of the L15 with the wheels independently mounted on pairs of centrally hinged V-struts and with vertical shock absorbing legs to the wing underside. Wheels were sometimes replaced by floats. Intended from the start for serial production, the L20's structure was simplified, with a pentagonal cross-section fuselage lacking the L15's rounded upper and lower surfaces. The fuselage was wooden framed with canvas covering. The overall strength of the structure, which had a safety factor of 12, was emphasised.

The wing was tapered in planform and was built around two spars, though there were two variants of the internal wing structure. The first three aircraft, type L20 A1, had wings stiffened against torsion by internal wire bracing but later aircraft, type L20 B1, used a torsion box formed by plywood skin ahead of the rear spar. Like the later version of the L15, the L20 used a combination of conventional ailerons and unusual wingtip flaps, rotating about an axis well ahead of mid-chord. The ailerons were directly controlled from the cockpit as normal and the tip flaps were linked to them with external rods and cranks. On early examples these flaps were roughly square, with a side less than a half of the chord at the tip, but at some later time they were reshaped to produce wing curved tips. The wings could be detached at the root in about five minutes, reducing the width of the L20 to 1.7 m (67 in) for road transport on a trailer pulled by a car.

At the beginning of the design and testing period the absence of a suitable, serially produced light aircraft engine was a concern and the wing was therefore mounted so that it could be moved fore and aft to allow for the varying centre of gravity positions resulting from engines of different weight. A glider version was contemplated though not finally used. Instead, the flight programme began with the L20 powered by the 9 kW (12.5 hp) Harley-Davidson motor cycle engine used in the L15. By mid 1925 this had been replaced with a new engine, the 15 kW (20 hp) air-cooled, flat twin Mercedes F7502a, which Klemm had persuaded Daimler's engine group to design and build for the light aircraft market. The cost of flying the L20 was low as its cruise fuel consumption was only 63 mL/km (45 mpg). From 1926 the uprated 15 kW (20 hp) Mercedes F7502b was fitted. The F7502 was central to the success of the L20, though it suffered from repeated rocker arm failures.

Having failed to persuade the Daimler management to undertake series production of the L20 despite its early successes, in 1927 Klemm left to set up his own company, Klemm Light Aircraft in Sindelfingen, later moving to Böblingen. Thereafter the L20 was often known as the Klemm-Daimler L20 or sometimes the Daimler-Klemm L20. After 1926, new designs appeared under Klemm's name alone; for example the Klemm L25, later Kl25, was a revision of the L20 with a 15 kW (20 hp) Salmson radial engine.

== Operational history ==
The 1925 Round Germany Flight involved five circuits over a total distance of 5,262 km (3,270 mi). Two early L20s and the twin-engined L21 competed against many aircraft from other German manufacturers. All three Daimler aircraft were very successful in the under 40 hp (30 kW) class, with the L21 the overall winner, receiving 25,000 Goldmarks (worth £1,250 in 1925) and the two L20's coming second and third and winning another 25,000 Goldmark between them. They also contributed to the award of first prize in the contest between German engined aircraft to Mercedes.

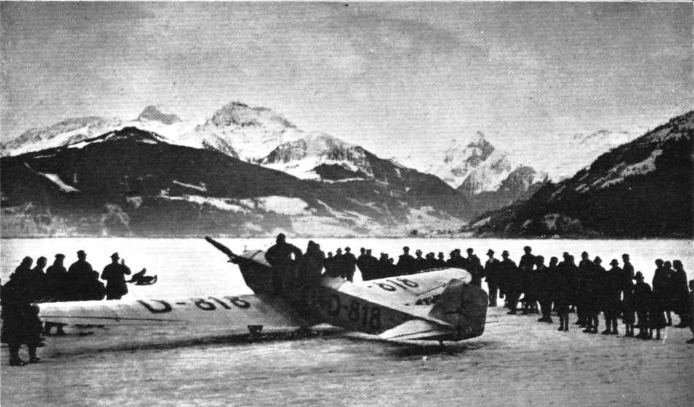
L 20 at Zeller See after crossing the Alps in winter

The best known and most significant flight by the L20 was the wintertime crossing of the Alps in early 1926. Flight Magazine hailed this as the "Vindication of the Light 'Plane", in the sense that it showed small aircraft to be a practical vehicle for travel over difficult terrain and in uncertain weather. The pilot was Guritzer and the navigator/engineer von Lansdorff, both from Daimler. The flight began at Daimler's Sindelfingen base on 16 February. No special preparation such as fuel dumps were made in advance and carefully prepared maps were lost overboard early in the flight. The weather frustrated several attempts to cross the Alps but at last the L20 landed in 300 mm (1 ft) of snow near Zeller See. The return journey reached eastwards, skirting the Alps via Budapest and Vienna and arriving home at Sindelfingen on 16 March.

During 1927 the L20 continued to contest competitions such as the Lilienthal Prize, winning most of the prizes in the lightplane class and making overseas visits such as the one to the UK in July. Private owners also took them on long tours, such as the 1927 North European flights of Anton Riediger but no-one went further with their L20 than Baron Freidrich Carl von König-Warthausen, who set off on 11 August 1928 on a world tour, beginning with a flight to Moscow, then on to Tehran, Calcutta and Singapore. From there he and the L20 crossed to North America by sea but flew across the United States, arriving in New York City on 3 September 1929 after travelling 36,000 km (22,369 mi) from Berlin.

== Variants ==
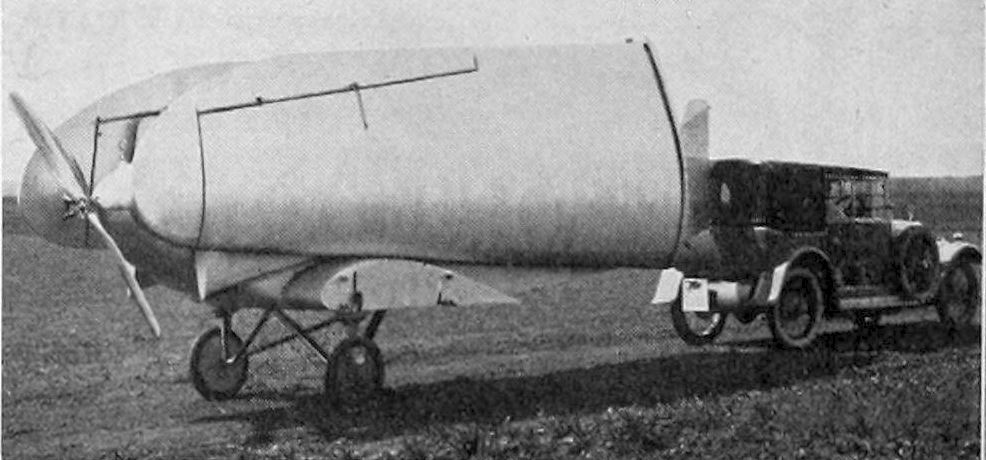
Daimler L 20 photo from Aero Digest January 1927

L20 A1
Internally wire-braced wing. Three built by Daimler aircraft.
L20 B1
Wing with ply-covered torsion box. Prototype built by Daimler but produced by Klemm Flugzeugebau.

== Aircraft on Display ==
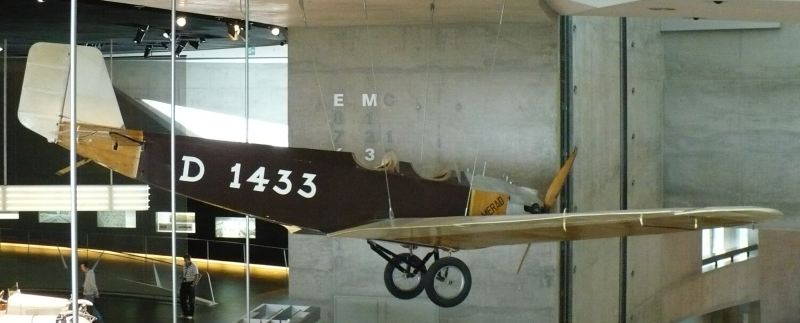
L20 (partial replica) in the Mercedes-Benz Museum in Stuttgart

- Mercedes-Benz Museum, Stuttgart:Daimler L20 B1 partial replica.

== Specifications ==
Data from General - Flight 1927; Performance - Deutsches Museum Archive

General characteristics

- Crew: two
- Wingspan: 13.0 m (42 ft 8 in)
- Wing area: 20.0 m^{2} (215 sq ft)
- Empty weight: 265 kg (584 lb)
- Gross weight: 450 kg (992 lb)
- Wing loading: 22.5 kg/m^{2}(4.60 lb/sqft)
- Powerplant: 1 × Mercedes F7502a 884 cc, bore 75 mm, stroke 100 mm, air-cooled flat twin, 15 kW (20 hp) 20 PS
- Propellers: 2-bladed
- Power loading: 30 kg/kW (50 lb/hp)

Performance

- Maximum speed: 105 km/h (65 mph, 57 kn)
- Range: 480 km (300 mi, 260 nmi)
- Service ceiling: 4,100 m (13,500 ft)
- Time to altitude: 12.6 min to 1,000 m (3,281 ft)
- Landing speed: 42 km/h (26 mph)
