= Daimler D.I =

German fighter biplane

D.I
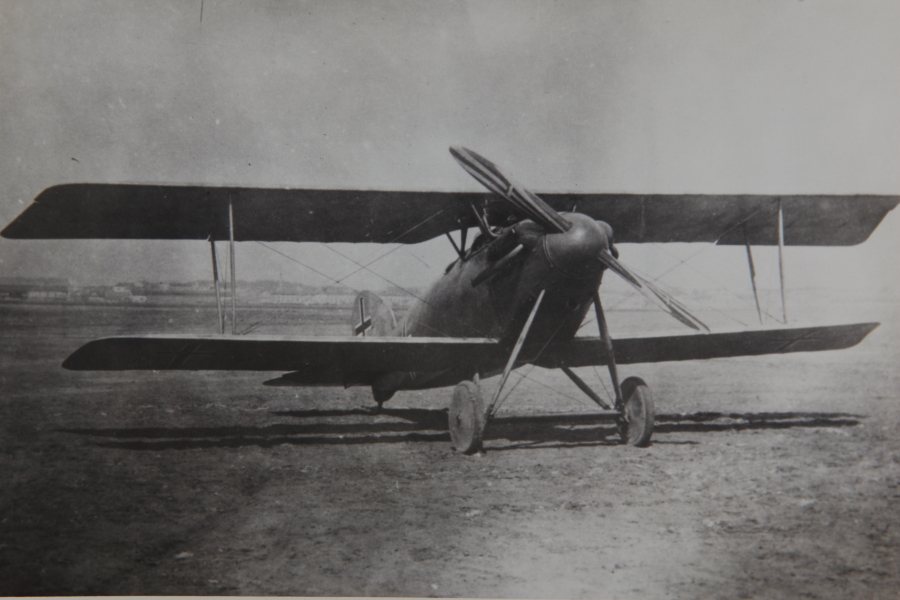

General information
- Type: Fighter
- Manufacturer: Daimler
- Designer: Karl Schopper
- Number built: 6

History
- First flight: 1918

The Daimler D.I (also known by the company designation L6) was a German fighter aircraft of World War I. It was a conventional biplane design with a very small interplane gap - the top wing nearly touched the top of the fuselage. Power was provided by a Daimler D.IIIb water-cooled V-8 engine.

== Design and development ==
The L6 prototype competed in the second Idflieg competition for a new fighter design in 1918. The competition was held at Adlershof from 22 May through 21 June. This resulted in an order for 20 aircraft being placed.

== History ==
Production commenced in 1918. Six examples were built by the time of the Armistice, at which time production was abandoned.

== Specifications (D.I) ==
Data from

General characteristics

- Crew: 1
- Length: 7.3 m (23 ft 11 in)
- Wingspan: 9.9 m (32 ft 6 in)
- Height: 2.76 m (9 ft 1 in)
- Wing area: 22.6 m^{2} (243 sq ft)
- Empty weight: 750 kg (1,653 lb)
- Gross weight: 925 kg (2,039 lb)
- Powerplant: 1 × Daimler D.IIIb V-8 water-cooled piston engine, 138 kW (185 hp)
- Propellers: 2-bladed fixed-pitch propeller

Performance

- Maximum speed: 183 km/h (114 mph, 99 kn)
- Endurance: 2 hours
- Time to altitude: 6,000 m (20,000 ft) in 30 minutes

Armament

- Guns: 2 × 7.92 mm LMG 08/15 machine guns
