= Daimler D.IIIb =

1918 aircraft engine developed in Germany

D.IIIb
- Type: 8-cylinder Vee water-cooled piston engine
- National origin: Germany
- Manufacturer: Daimler Motoren Gesellschaft

The Daimler D.IIIb was a V-8, water-cooled, piston engine developed in Germany by Daimler Motoren Gesellschaft, for use in aircraft in 1918.

== Design and development ==
Little is known of the Daimler D.IIIb, (not related to the Mercedes D.III), other than it was used for a succession of Daimler fighter prototypes in 1918.

== Applications ==
Data from:The Complete Book of Fighters & German Aircraft of the First World War

- Daimler L6
- Daimler L8
- Daimler L9
- Daimler L11
- Daimler L14
- Daimler D.I
- Daimler CL.I

== Specifications (Daimler D.IIIb) ==
Data from

=== General characteristics ===
- Type: 90° V-8 liquid-cooled engine

=== Components ===
- Fuel system: Carburetor
- Cooling system: Liquid-cooled

=== Performance ===
- Power output: maximum 185 hp (138 kW)

== See also ==
Comparable engines

- Hispano-Suiza 8B

Related lists

- List of aircraft engines

== Bibliography ==
- Gray, Peter; Thetford, Owen (1970). German Aircraft of the First World War (2nd ed.). London: Putnam. pp. 314–317. ISBN 0-370-00103-6.
- Green, William; Swanborough, Gordon (1994). The Complete Book of Fighters. Godalming, UK: Salamander Books. p. 339. ISBN 1-85833-777-1.
