= Klemm Kl 26 =

German training aircraft

Kl 26
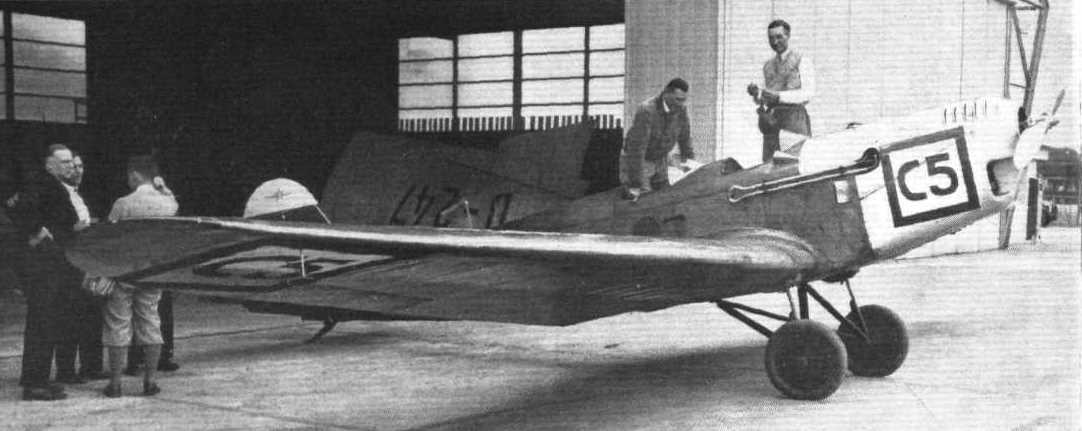

General information
- Type: Training plane
- National origin: Germany
- Manufacturer: Klemm
- Number built: 170 (German-built L 26 only)

History
- First flight: 1928
- Developed from: Klemm Kl 25

The Klemm L 26, later Klemm Kl 26, was a low-wing trainer aircraft built by Klemm.

== Design and development ==
The L 26 was a larger, reinforced development of the Klemm L 25.

Like the L 25, the L 26 was a single engined low-wing monoplane with fixed conventional landing gear. Most variants were two-seaters with tandem open cockpits.

== Operational history ==
The L 26 was first flown in 1928 and entered production the following year and was produced until 1936. The L 26 was also produced in the United States by Aeromarine-Klemm as the AKL-26.

In 1931, Oskar Dinort won the Deutschlandflug in an L 26 Va. Other notable pilots of the L 26 included Ernst Udet and Elly Beinhorn.

== Variants ==
=== Klemm ===
This is an incomplete list.

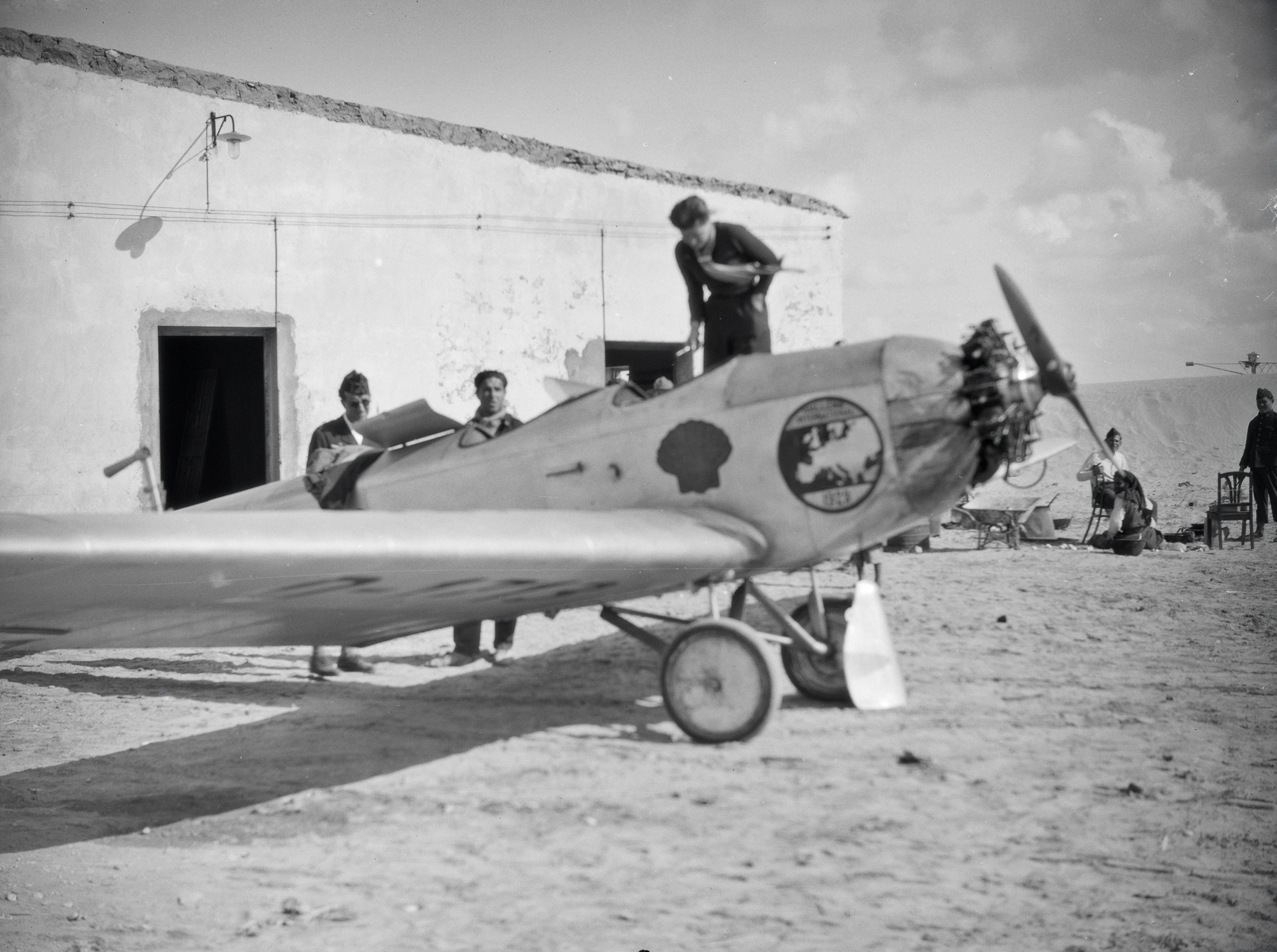
Elly Beinhorn's radial engined L 26

L 26 II
Two-seat trainer, radial engine
- L 26 IIc, cowl ring
L 26 III
Enclosed cockpit
L 26 V
Two-seat trainer
- L 26 Va, 95 hp Argus As 8A-2 engine
- L 26 Vc, 120 hp Argus As 8 engine; most produced variant
- L 26 Ve, 120 hp Argus As 8A-3 engine
VL 26
Three-seat touring aircraft

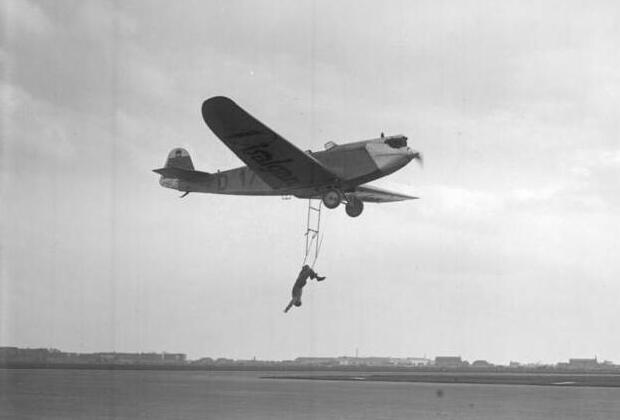
Klemm L 27

L 27
Enlarged front cockpit
L 28
Aerobatics aircraft, 150 hp Siemens-Halske Sh 14A engine
L 30
Homebuilt aircraft based on the L 25/26

=== Aeromarine-Klemm ===
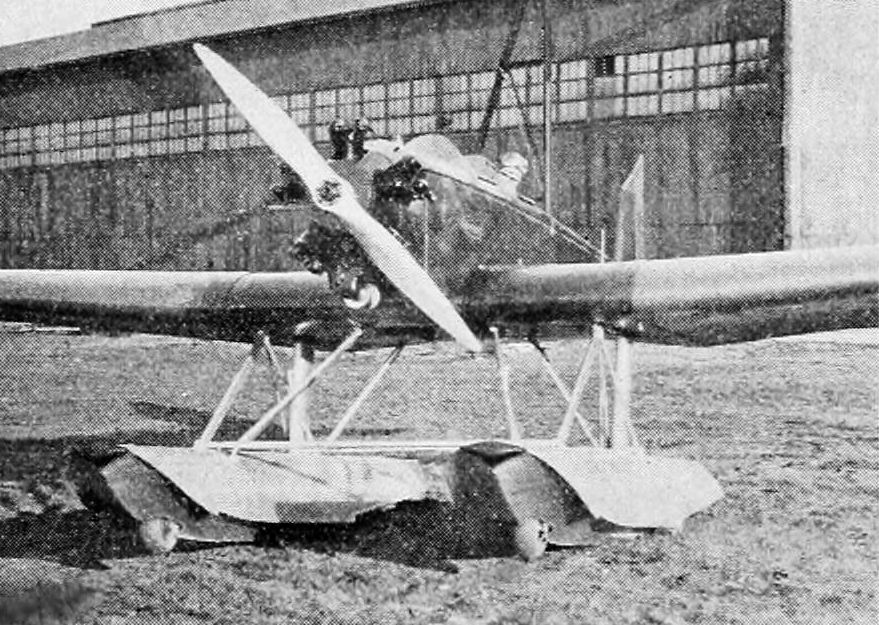
American-built AKL-26 floatplane

AKL-60
Prototypes of the AKL-26, 3 built
AKL-26
70 hp LeBlond engine, 7 built
AKL-26 Special
Floatplane conversion of the AKL-26 with Edo floats and a 65 hp Velie M-5 engine, one converted
AKL-26A
Extra fuel tank, one AKL-26 converted
L-26A
Floatplane version of the AKL-26A, at least 14 built
L-26B
Also AKL-26B or AKL-85, 85 hp LeBlond 85-5DF engine, floats optional
L-26X
65 hp Velie M-5 engine
L-27
Also AKL-27, L-26B with 110 hp LeBlond 110-7DF engine

== Surviving aircraft ==
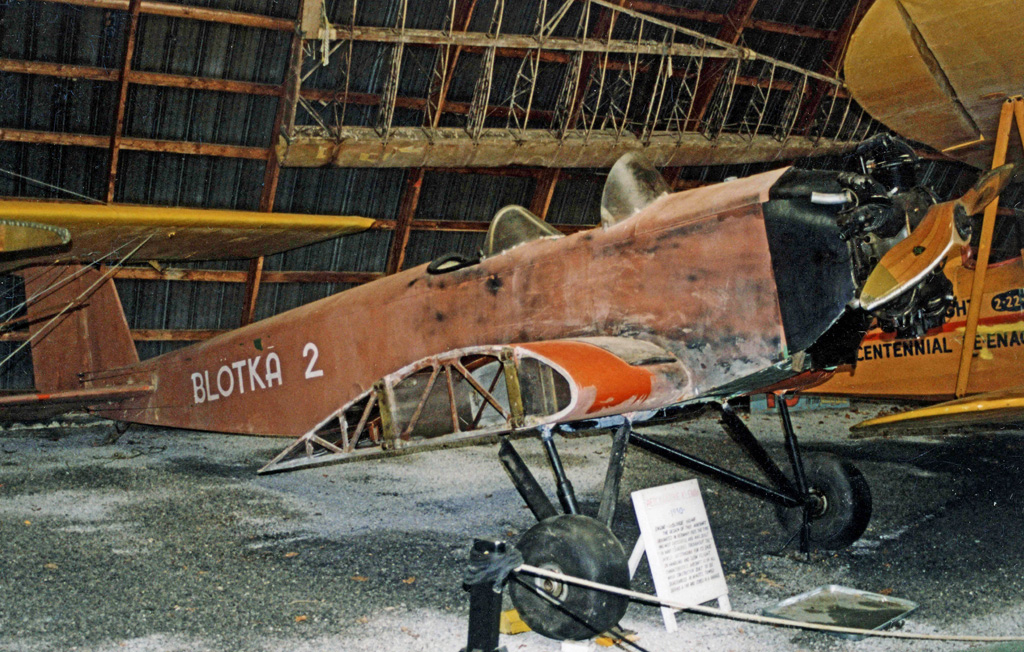
Surviving AKL-26 at Old Rhinebeck Aerodrome

Of the 170 aircraft built in Germany, only one survived World War II, and that aircraft no longer exists. However, an American-built AKL-26 is on display in a dismantled state at Old Rhinebeck Aerodrome in Red Hook, New York.

== Specifications (AKL-26A) ==
Data from

General characteristics

- Crew: 2
- Capacity: 256.5 kg (565 lb)
- Length: 7.16 m (23 ft 6 in)
- Wingspan: 12.48 m (40 ft 2 in)
- Height: 2.13 m (7 ft 0 in)
- Wing area: 18 m^{2} (194.5 sq ft)
- Empty weight: 465.3 kg (1,025 lb)
- Gross weight: 721.8 kg (1,590 lb)
- Powerplant: 1 × LeBlond radial engine, 52 kW (70 hp)
- Propellers: 2-bladed

Performance

- Maximum speed: 148.8 km/h (93 mph, 81 kn)
- Cruise speed: 130 km/h (80 mph, 70 kn)
- Stall speed: 64 km/h (40 mph, 35 kn)
- Range: 768 km (480 mi, 420 nmi)
- Service ceiling: 3,660 m (12,000 ft)
- Rate of climb: 3.05 m/s (600 ft/min)
- Wing loading: 40 kg/m^{2} (8.18 lb/sq ft)
- Power/mass: 10.3 kg/hp (22.7 lbs/hp)

== See also ==
Related development

- Klemm Kl 25

Related lists

- List of military aircraft of Germany
