= Daimler L15 =

German two-seat low-powered light aircraft

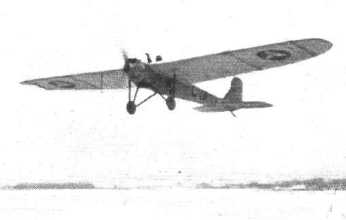

General information
- Type: Light two seatsports aircraft/glider
- National origin: Germany
- Manufacturer: Daimler Aircraft Company
- Designer: Hans Klemm
- Number built: 1

History
- First flight: 1919

The Daimler L15, sometimes later known as the Daimler-Klemm L15 or the Klemm-Daimler L15 was an early two-seat low-powered light aircraft intended to popularise flying. In mid-career it flew as a glider.

== Design and development ==
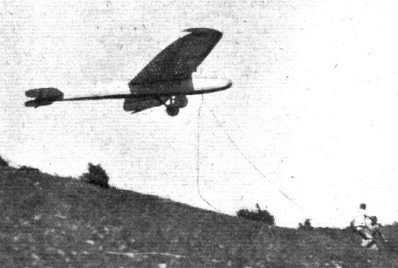
The L15 in glider configuration

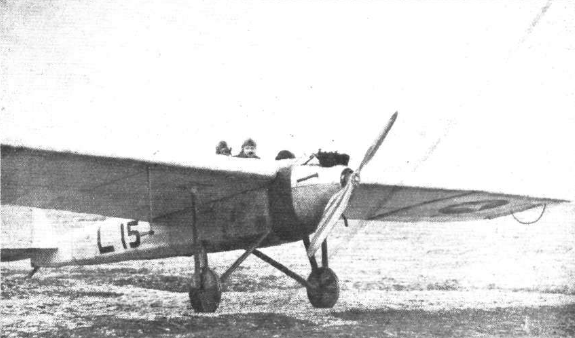
L15 with revised undercarriage

By the end of the First World War, Hanns Klemm had moved from Dornier to the aircraft branch of Daimler Motors and had designed two prototype fighters, the Daimler L11 and L14. With military aviation ended by the terms of the Versailles Treaty, he turned to developing a low-power light aircraft. The 1919 Daimler L15 was a high cantilever wing aircraft with a 6 kW (7.5 hp) Indian motorcycle engine. Rather little detailed information on it seems to have survived; it had unusual rotating wingtips for roll control instead of ailerons and a single axle undercarriage. It suffered serious propeller damage in 1919, early in the testing programme. From then on Daimler and Klemm abandoned aviation; Klemm remained with Daimler, concentrating on streamlined racing cars and locomotives.

During 1920 some German aviation enthusiasts realised that, though Germany was forbidden by the allies to build aeroplanes, gliders were not included in that category, resulting in a series of competitions on the Wasserkuppe that became known as the Rhön contests. Perhaps stimulated by these events, Klemm proposed in 1922 that the L15 should be rebuilt as a glider and obtained approval from the Daimler management. The engine was demounted and replaced with a long, smooth nose, deliberately designed to be easily removable so that the engine could be reinstalled if desired. The pilot sat at the wing leading edge in a cockpit within the removable nose and there was a passenger cockpit between the two wing spars at about one third chord. The fuselage was formed from four longerons, positioned by formers and wire-braced into a rectangular section, but with rounded upper and lower fairings. Its smooth fuselage and cantilever wing, together with an empennage that had no external bracing, made it aerodynamically very clean for its time.

The fabric-covered, tapered wings were built around two box spars. The 1919 machine had a single piece wing but gliders need to be easily transportable and so the wings were rebuilt in three pieces. The rudder and elevators were removable and the outer parts of the tailplane could be hinged upwards, again for ease of transport.

At some point during the reconstruction the fixed axle undercarriage was replaced with a more refined arrangement where the wheels were separately mounted on hinged and faired V-struts from the fuselage underside and with vertical shock absorber struts to the wing underside, allowing much larger wheel deflections on landing than with the less than half wheel-diameter allowed by end-sprung rigid axle mountings. Unusually, the wheels, which had three-ply centres, were ash-tyred because rubber was expensive in postwar Germany.

Given the limitations of its relatively low aspect ratio (about 7.5), the L.15 performed satisfactorily as a glider. In the summer of 1922 it made flights of up to 13 minutes, with an estimated L/D of about 16.

Towards the end of 1923 the L15 received a second-hand, 9 kW (12.5 hp) Harley-Davidson motorcycle engine, mounted with its cylinders exposed for cooling and driving a two-bladed propeller though 3:1 epicyclic reduction gearing. There were again two open cockpits in tandem, but since the nose was now much shorter the pilot occupied the cockpit previously used by the passenger on the glider and the passenger sat close behind him at the wing trailing edge.

During tests, the powered L15 reached an altitude of 2,150 m (7,050 ft) with only the pilot on board and 1,100 m (3,610 ft) with a passenger; a solo flight lasting 185 minutes was made and one passenger-carrying flight lasted 122 minutes. Other flights covered 190 km (118 mi) solo and 190 km (118 mi) with a passenger. In the autumn of 1924 the L15 was fitted with floats and took off from water successfully, at first carrying only the pilot and then with a passenger. Takeoff took 12 seconds in both cases, even with 12.5 hp. Early in these tests a new engine, an uncowled Daimler-Versuchmotor F7506 was flown for the first time. This unusual small, two-stroke, six-cylinder, air-cooled radial engine, fitted with a Roots blower, had been designed specifically for light aircraft and produced 15 kW (20 hp), but could not be developed to produce higher powers and was soon abandoned in favour of the Harley-Davidson.

The final new engine to power the L15 was a much more powerful (30 kW (40 hp)) Salmson. With it in place, the L15 was considerably refined with flaps, slats and pneumatic, rubber-tyred wheels.

The flights with the low-powered Harley-Davidson engine attracted attention and launched Klemm on a path which led him, after designing at least two more Daimler light aircraft, to set up his own light aircraft company in 1926. In 1924 the L15 was finally refitted with its motorcycle engine and was eventually put on display in the Deutsches Museum with the placard "The First Light Aircraft", but was destroyed during World War II.

== Specifications (Harley-Davidson engine) ==
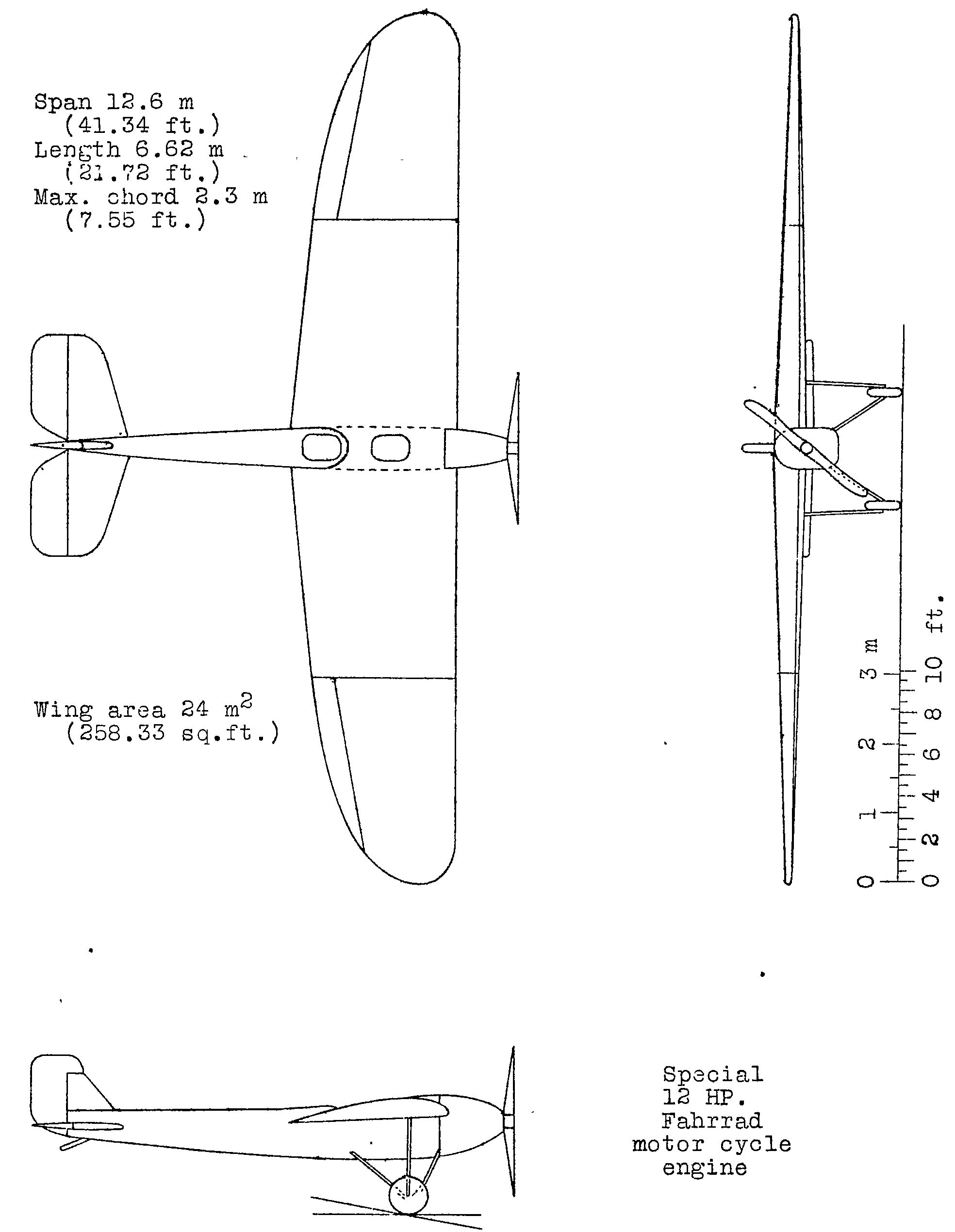
Daimler L 15 3-view drawing from NACA-TM-301

Data from Deutsches Museum Arkiv

General characteristics

- Crew: two
- Wingspan: 12.6 m (41 ft 4 in)
- Wing area: 21 m^{2} (230 sq ft)
- Empty weight: 200 kg (441 lb) (less than)
- Powerplant: 1 × Harley-Davidson two cylinder, geared down 3:1, 9.3 kW (12.5 hp) . Removable for use as glider
- Propellers: 2-bladed

== See also ==
- Volksflugzeug
