= Daimler L14 =

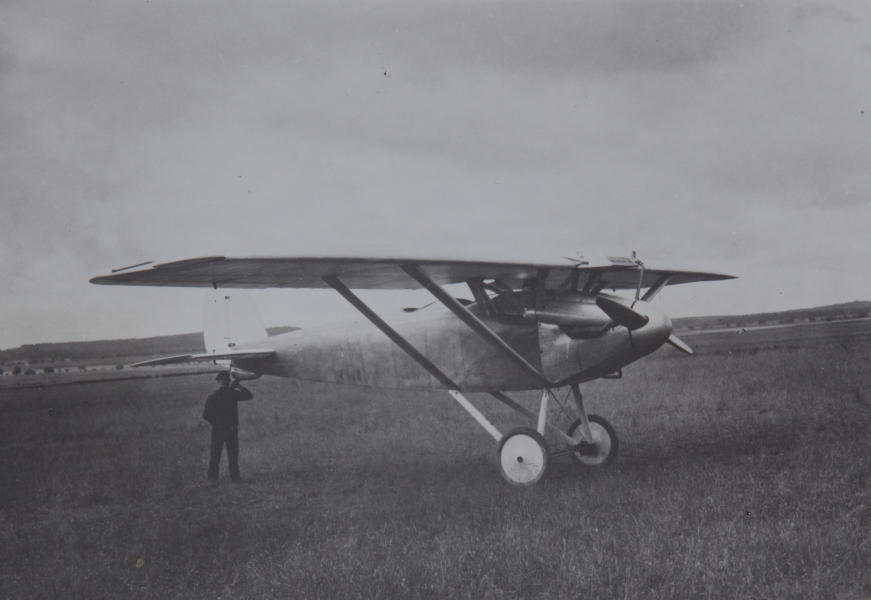

General information
- Type: Fighter
- National origin: Germany
- Manufacturer: Daimler
- Designer: Hans Klemm
- Number built: 1

History
- First flight: 1919
- Developed from: Daimler L11

The Daimler L14 was a two-seat, high-wing, monoplane fighter built in 1919. It was built as a two-person, aerodynamically improved version of the Daimler L11 aircraft. It was powered by the Daimler D.IIIb water-cooled V-8 engine and was armed with two 7.92 mm (0.312 in) machine guns, one forward and one rearward firing. One prototype was built. The L14V, an unbuilt mail carrier variant was offered for sale to Chile but no orders followed.

== Specifications (L14) ==
Data from

General characteristics

- Crew: 2
- Wingspan: 12.3 m (40 ft 4 in)
- Wing area: 30 m^{2} (320 sq ft)
- Empty weight: 870 kg (1,918 lb)
- Gross weight: 1,270 kg (2,800 lb)
- Powerplant: 1 × Daimler D.IIIb water-cooled V-8 engine, 138 kW (185 hp)
- Propellers: 2-bladed fixed-pitch propeller

Performance

- Maximum speed: 206 km/h (128 mph, 111 kn)
- Range: 700 km (430 mi, 380 nmi)
- Rate of climb: 5.37 m/s (1,057 ft/min)

Armament

- Guns: 2 × 7.92 mm (0.312 in) machine guns

== Bibliography ==
- Gray, Peter & Thetford, Owen (1987) [1970]. German Aircraft of the First World War (2nd ed.). London: Putnam. ISBN 0-85177-809-7.
- Green, William & Swanborough, Gordon (2001) [1994]. The Complete Book of Fighters: An Illustrated Encyclopedia of Every Fighter Built and Flown (Revised and Updated ed.). London: Salamander Books. ISBN 1-84065-269-1.
- Herris, Jack (2020). German Aircraft of Minor Manufacturers in WWI: A Centennial Perspective on Great War Airplanes. Gret War Aviation Centennial Series (49). Vol. 1: Alter to Korn. n.p.: Aeronaut Books. ISBN 978-1-935881-85-8.
