= Klemm =

Klemm Leichtflugzeugbau
- Industry: Aircraft manufacture
- Founded: 1926
- Defunct: April 1959
- Fate: Merged
- Successor: Bölkow
- Headquarters: Böblingen, Germany

The Klemm Leichtflugzeugbau GmbH ("Klemm Light Aircraft Company") was a German aircraft manufacturer noteworthy for sports and touring planes of the 1930s.

The company was founded in Böblingen in 1926 by Dr. Hanns Klemm, who had previously worked for both Zeppelin and the Daimler Aircraft Company.

== History ==
While working at Daimler, Klemm had developed his ideas for a light aircraft, to be made of wood for strength and lightness. It should be easy to manufacture, aerodynamically efficient with low mass and wing loading, for which a low-powered engine would be sufficient. Klemm's first design, the Daimler L.15, was a light aircraft with a single 7.5 hp (5.5 kW) Indian motorcycle engine. This aircraft flew in early 1919, although a 12 hp (8.8 kW) Harley-Davidson engine was used instead of the originally-envisioned engine.

Klemm then designed a squared-off version of the cylindrical fuselage of the L.15, which could be more easily built, which he designated the L.20, and he founded his own company to produce it. This aircraft, of which more than 100 were built, was powered by a 20 hp (15 kW) Daimler engine designed by Ferdinand Porsche.

In 1928 Friedrich Karl von Koenig-Warthausen made a solo flight to Moscow in a Klemm L.20, then decided to keep on going, circumnavigating the world and earning himself the Hindenburg Cup, the highest German honour for aeronautical achievement.

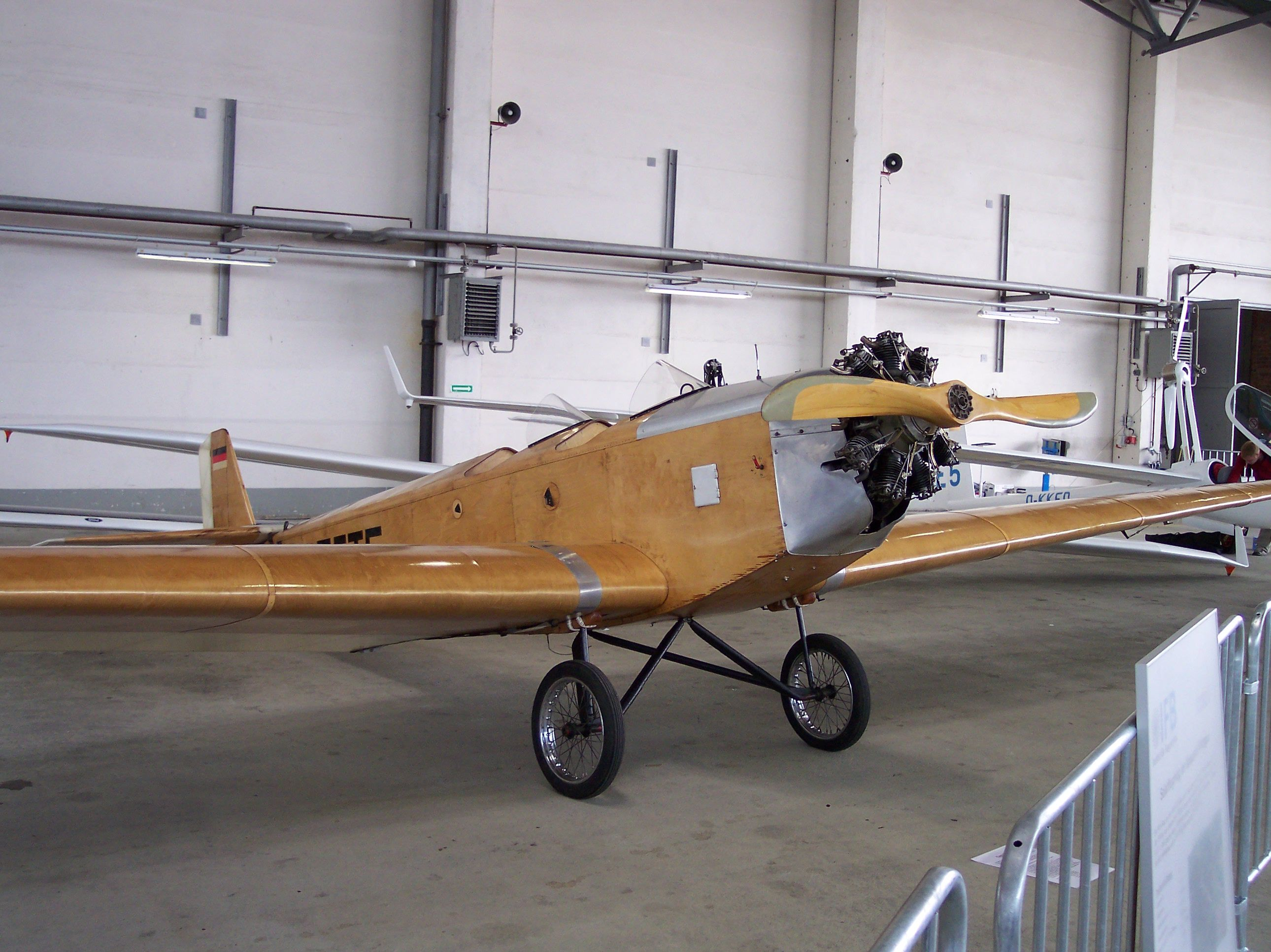
Klemm Kl 25A

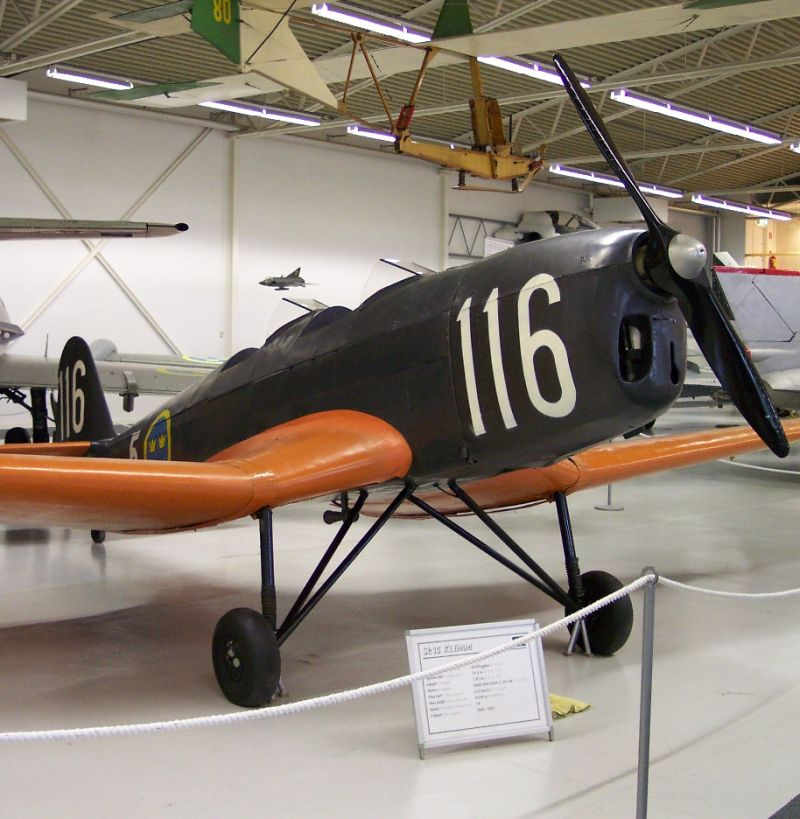
Klemm Kl 35

From the L.20 was developed the Klemm L.25, later redesignated the Kl 25. Capable of being fitted with fourteen different engine types, over 600 were sold, and licenses to manufacture them were issued in Great Britain and the United States.

In January 1930 Mohamed Sidki flew from Berlin to Cairo, Egypt in a Klemm L25a. He landed in Cairo on 26 January, becoming a political hero by defying the British authorities who had denied him permission to land (he became known as The First Egyptian Eagle). Sidki wrote a letter to Klemm, who had helped outfit the plane for the long journey, stating "your beautiful little machine, the L25a has carried me through wind, snow and torrential rain without any damage to myself, the plane and the engine."

In 1931 Elly Beinhorn became the second woman to fly from Europe to Australia flying a Klemm Kl 26 equipped with an Argus engine, and winning the Hindenburg Cup.

Klemm suffered a setback in 1935 when the prototype Kl 35 crashed during testing at Rechlin. This was explained as a material defect, but was more likely due to overstressing of the wings. Klemm revised and brought the Kl 35 up to the required specifications and manufacturing began. Around 2,000 of the aircraft were built, both at Klemm's plant, and by Fieseler, and later by the Czech company Moravan Otrokovice, for the Luftwaffe as a trainer. During World War II Klemm produced and designed a range of aircraft, such as the Klemm Kl 105, Kl 106 and Kl 107, as well as the Klemm Kl 151 and Kl 152.

The Klemm Aircraft Company was refounded in 1952 after the post-war ban on aircraft construction was lifted. Klemm himself by this time was semi-retired, and the company was run by his son Hanns-Jürgen Klemm. This company's first model, Kl 107-A, made its maiden flight in mid-1956. In April 1959, Bölkow took over Klemm, and with the successor of the Kl 107-C named the Bölkow 207, the name of Klemm disappeared from the list of aircraft manufacturers.

== Aircraft ==
Klemm aircraft included:

- Klemm (Daimler) L.20, light leisure and training aircraft, 1924
- Klemm Kl 25, light leisure and training aircraft, 1928
- Klemm Kl 26, light leisure and training aircraft, 1929
- Klemm Kl 31, single-engine transport, 1931
- Klemm Kl 32, single-engine transport, 1931
- Klemm Kl 33, (Klemm L33), single-seat ultra-light sportplane (prototype), 1933
- Klemm Kl 35, sportplane and trainer, 1935
- Klemm Kl 36, single-engine transport, 1934
- Klemm Kl 105, touring plane, development of Kl 35 (prototypes)
- Klemm Kl 106, sportsplane, development of Kl 35 (prototypes)
- Klemm Kl 107, light leisure and training aircraft
- Klemm Kl 151, touring plane (project), 1942
- Klemm Kl 152, fighter (project)

== See also ==
- List of RLM aircraft designations
- Volksflugzeug
