= Daimler L11 =

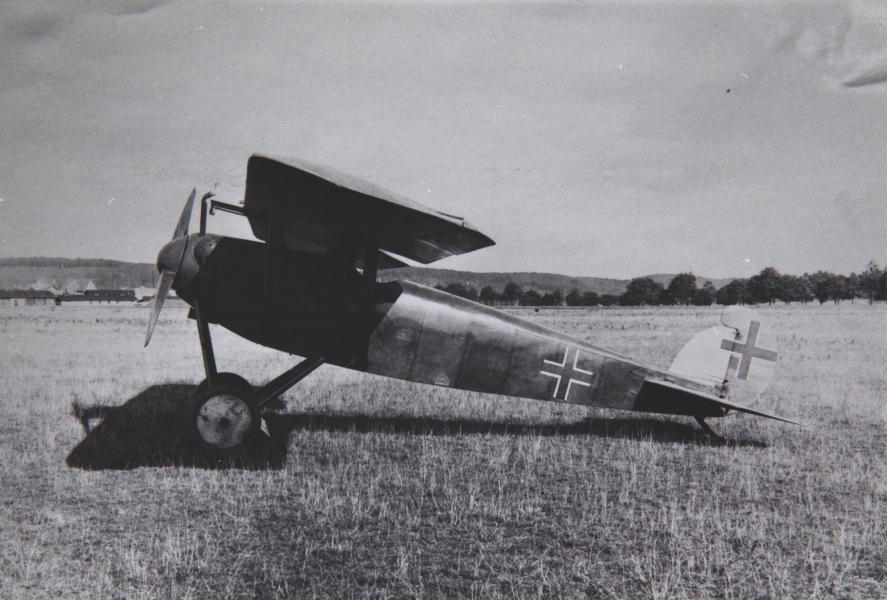

General information
- Type: Fighter
- National origin: Germany
- Manufacturer: Daimler
- Designer: Hans Klemm
- Number built: 1

History
- First flight: 1 October 1918
- Variant: Daimler L14

The Daimler L11 was a German single-seat, parasol-wing, monoplane fighter built during the First World War for the Imperial German Air Service (Luftstreitkräfte). A single prototype was built in 1918, but the war ended before it could be accepted for service. The two-seat Daimler L14 was based on this aircraft.

== Description ==
Hans Klemm's first design for Daimler, the L11 was an exceptionally clean streamlined parasol monoplane that was powered by the company's water-cooled, 185 hp (138 kW) D.IIIb V-8 engine with a two-bladed propeller. A single-seat aircraft, the prototype was unarmed. The sole prototype first flew on 1 October 1918, and continued testing through to February of the following year. The aircraft was initially delivered with unbalanced ailerons, but it was fitted with swivelling wingtips that acted as servo tabs and balanced the ailerons in 1919. Had the war lasted long enough for the Air Service's Inspectorate of Flying Troops (Idflieg) to accept the design, the L11 would have been designated as the Daimler D.III.

== Specifications (L11) ==
Data from

General characteristics

- Crew: 1
- Length: 8.15 m (26 ft 9 in)
- Wingspan: 12 m (39 ft 4 in)
- Wing area: 28.8 m^{2} (310 sq ft)
- Powerplant: 1 × Daimler D.IIIb water-cooled V-8 engine, 138 kW (185 hp)
- Propellers: 2-bladed fixed-pitch propeller

Performance

- Maximum speed: 240 km/h (150 mph, 130 kn)
- Service ceiling: 8,400 m (27,600 ft)
- Time to altitude:
  - 3.2 minutes to 1,000 m (3,300 ft)
  - 13 minutes to 5,000 m (16,000 ft)
  - 17 minutes to 6,000 m (20,000 ft)

== Bibliography ==
- Gray, Peter & Thetford, Owen (1987) [1970]. German Aircraft of the First World War (2nd ed.). London: Putnam. ISBN 0-85177-809-7.
- Green, William & Swanborough, Gordon (2001) [1994]. The Complete Book of Fighters: An Illustrated Encyclopedia of Every Fighter Built and Flown (Revised and Updated ed.). London: Salamander Books. ISBN 1-84065-269-1.
- Herris, Jack (2020). German Aircraft of Minor Manufacturers in WWI: A Centennial Perspective on Great War Airplanes. Gret War Aviation Centennial Series (49). Vol. 1: Alter to Korn. n.p.: Aeronaut Books. ISBN 978-1-935881-85-8.
