= Klemm Kl 107 =

Light single engine aircraft developed in Germany in the 1940s

Kl 107
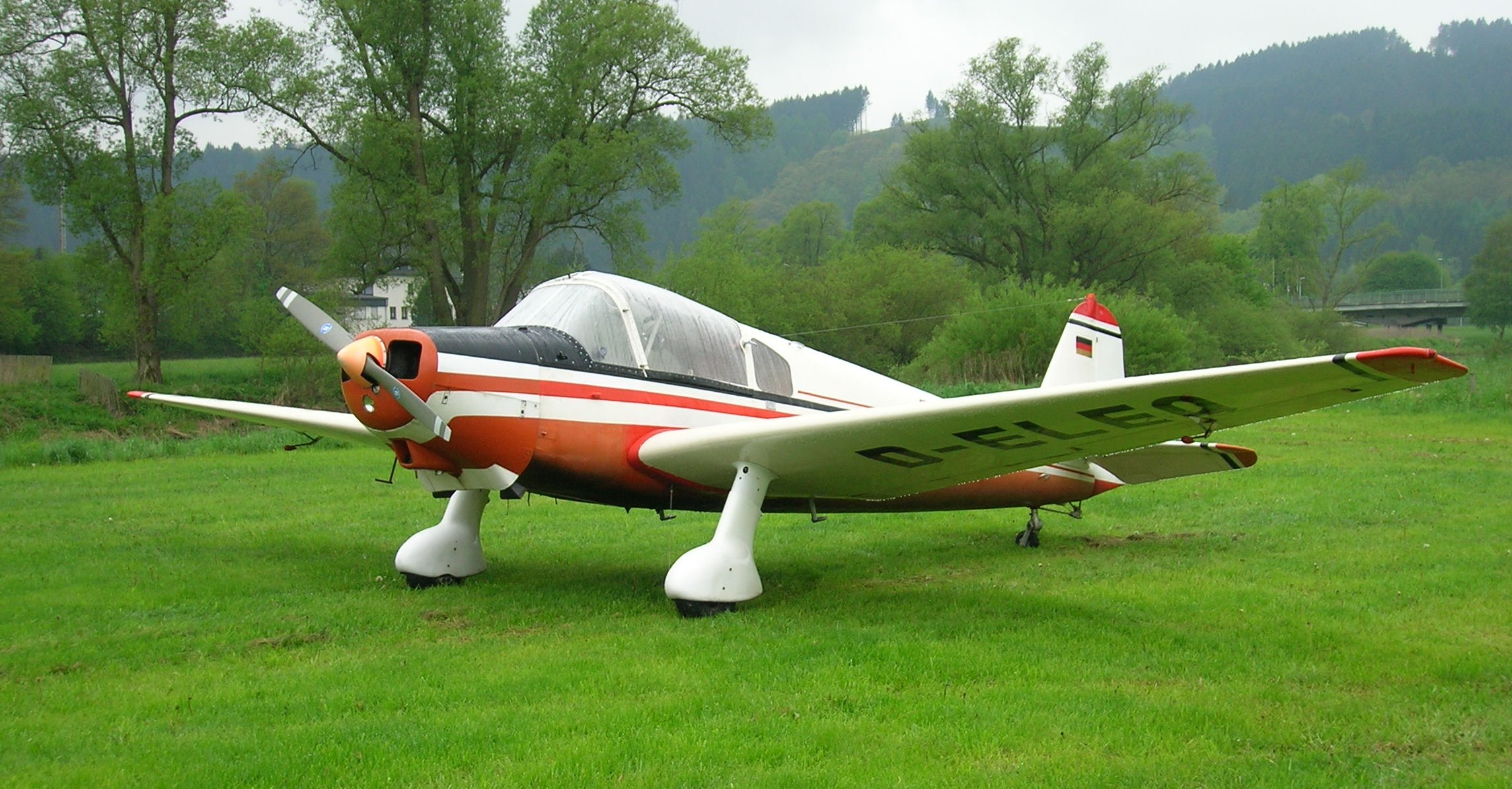
- Klemm Kl 107 C

General information
- Type: Civil utility aircraft
- National origin: Germany
- Manufacturer: Klemm; Bölkow
- Number built: 7 (1940s); 54 (1950s)

History
- First flight: 1940
- Developed into: Bölkow Bo 207

The Klemm Kl 107 was a two-seat light aircraft developed in Germany in 1940. It was a conventional low-wing cantilever monoplane of wooden construction with fixed tailwheel undercarriage. Wartime production totalled only five prototypes and some 20 production machines before the Klemm factory was destroyed by Allied bombing. Following World War II and the lifting of aviation restrictions on Germany, production recommenced in 1955 with a modernised version, the Kl 107B, of which Klemm built a small series before selling all rights to the design to Bölkow. This firm further revised the design and built it as the Kl 107C before using it as the basis for their own Bo 207.

== Development ==
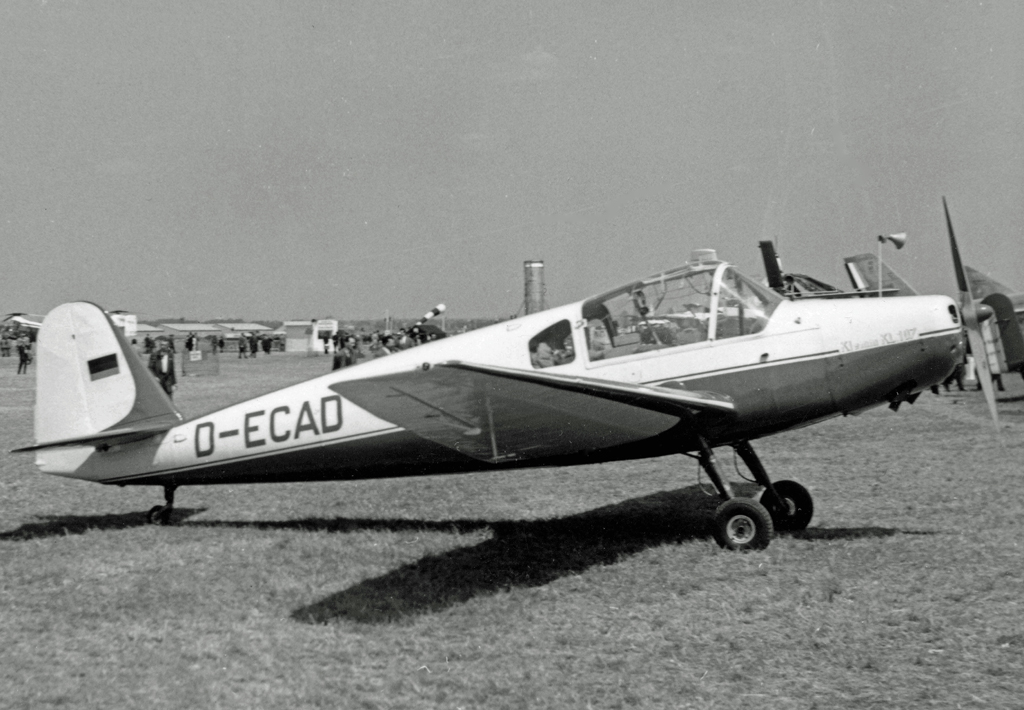
The postwar prototype Klemm Kl 107 in 1957 after modification to Kl 107B standard

The Kl 107 was a development from earlier Klemm designs and was a single-engined two-seat low-wing monoplane with a conventional landing gear. The first prototype registered D-EXKL first flew in early 1940 powered by a 105 hp Hirth HM500A-1 engine. Seven prototypes were built at Boblingen in 1940 and 1941 as a private venture but only six had flown by the time the project was stopped by the war.

After the war Hans Klemm Flugzeugbau joined forces with a small engineering firm Bolkow Entwicklungen as a joint-venture to further develop the Kl 107 design. The new prototype, registered D-ECAD, was built at Nabern and first flew at Stuggart Airport on 4 September 1956. Originally flown as a Kl 107 with a Continental C90-12F engine, it was modified as a Kl 107A and then it was re-engined in 1957 with a Lycoming O-320-A2A engine and redesignated Kl 107B. It was exhibited at the 1957 Paris Air Show.

A production run of 25 aircraft were then built in 1958 and 1959. In 1959 a Kl 107C variant with a modified cabin was flown and production continued of this variant until the last and 54th post-war aircraft was flown on 27 September 1961. A four-seat variant was developed as the BO 207.

== Variants ==
Kl 107
Seven prototypes with Hirth HM500 engines, only six flown.
Kl 107 V-8
New post-war prototype with a Continental C90-12F engine first flown in 1956.
Kl 107A
The V-8 prototype modified, it was later re-engined as the Kl 107B.
Kl 107B
Production variant with a Lycoming O-320-A1A engine, one prototype converted from Kl 107A and 25 production aircraft. One modified as the prototype Kl 107C and the last two completed as Kl 107Cs.
Kl 107C
Variant with modified cabin with three seats, prototype first flown 3 June 1959. One prototype and 29 production aircraft (including two originally to be Kl 107Bs).
Kl 107D
Original designation of a four-seat variant that became the Bolkow Bo 207.

== Specifications (Kl 107B) ==
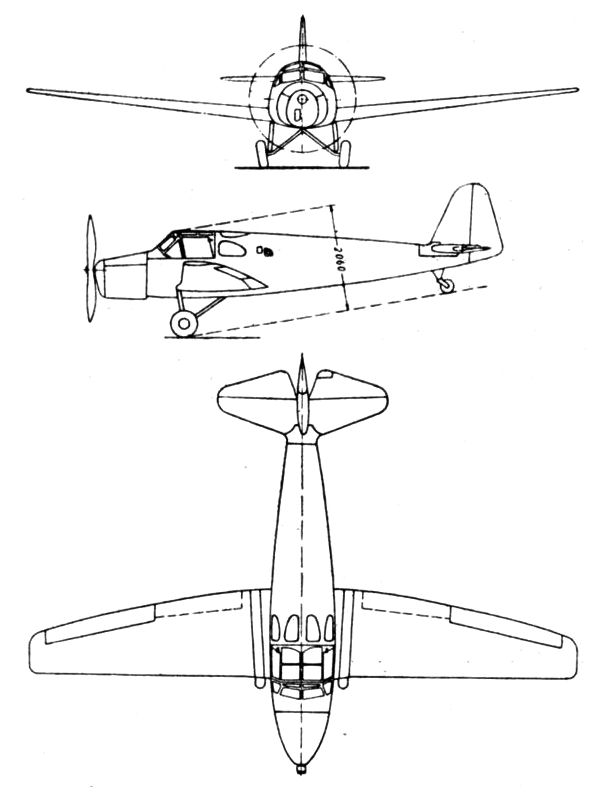
Klemm KL.107 3-view drawing from L'Aerophile February 1942

Data from

General characteristics

- Crew: 1
- Capacity: 2
- Length: 8.30 m (27 ft 3 in)
- Wingspan: 10.88 m (35 ft 8 in)
- Height: 2.15 m (7 ft 1 in)
- Wing area: 14.8 m^{2} (159 sq ft)
- Airfoil: NACA 230 series
- Gross weight: 940 kg (2,072 lb) (3 persons on board)
- Powerplant: 1 × Lycoming O-320-A2A 4-cylinder air-cooled horizontally-opposed piston engine, 110 kW (150 hp)
- Propellers: 2-bladed Hoffmann wooden propeller

Performance

- Maximum speed: 215 km/h (134 mph, 116 kn)
- Landing speed: 80 km/h (50 mph; 43 kn)
- Rate of climb: 4.20 m/s (827 ft/min)

== See also ==
Related development

- Klemm Kl 105
- Bölkow Bo 207
