= List of B1 aircraft =

This is a list of aircraft denominated B1, B-1, B.1 or B.I.

== B-1 ==
- Rockwell B-1 Lancer, a 1974 USAF heavy bomber aircraft
- Bensen B-1, a Bensen aircraft
- Blackburn B-1, a 1938 British twin-engined four-seat touring aircraft
- Boeing B-1, a 1919 seaplane
- Huff-Daland XB-1, a 1927 American biplane bomber
- Boom XB-1, a technology demonstrator aircraft for the Boom SST.

== B.1 ==
- Sopwith B.1, a British Sopwith Aviation Company aircraft

== B.I ==
- AEG B.I, a German reconnaissance aircraft during World War I
- Albatros B.I, a 1913 German military reconnaissance aircraft
- Aviatik B.I, a 1914 German two-seat reconnaissance biplane
- Bavarian B I, an 1896 German steam locomotive model
- DFW B.I, a 1914 German aircraft
- Euler B.I, an Idflieg B-class designation aircraft
- Fokker B.I (1915), an Austro-Hungarian observation aircraft
- Fokker B.I (1922), a German reconnaissance flying boat
- Halberstadt B.I, an Idflieg B-class designation aircraft
- Hansa-Brandenburg B.I, a 1914 unarmed military reconnaissance biplane
- Kondor B.I, an Idflieg B-class designation aircraft
- Lohner B.I, a KuKLFT B-class designation aircraft
- LVG B.I, a 1910s German two-seat reconnaissance biplane
- NFW B.I, an Idflieg B-class designation aircraft
- Otto B.I, an Idflieg B-class designation aircraft
- Rumpler B.I, an Idflieg B-class designation aircraft
- Sablatnig B.I, an Idflieg B-class designation aircraft

== See also ==
- Fokker B.I (disambiguation)
