= B2 =

B2, B02, B.II, B.2 or B-2 may refer to:

== Transportation ==
=== Aircraft ===
- AEG B.II, a German aircraft during World War I
- Albatros B.II, a 1914 unarmed German two-seat reconnaissance biplane
- Aviatik B.II, a 1915 German reconnaissance aircraft
- Blackburn B-2, a British biplane side-by-side trainer aircraft
- Brantly B-2, a helicopter
- Curtiss B-2 Condor, an American biplane bomber built before World War II
- DFW B.II, a 1914 German aircraft
- Euler B.II, a German Idflieg B-class designation aircraft
- Farman B.2, a French Farman aircraft
- Flanders B.2, a 1912 British experimental biplane
- Fokker B.II (1916), two different German unarmed observation aircraft of World War I
- Fokker B.II (1923), a 1923 Dutch reconnaissance flying boat
- Halberstadt B.II, a German Idflieg B-class designation aircraft
- Lohner B.II
- LVG B.II, a 1910s German two-seat reconnaissance biplane
- Northrop B-2 Spirit, an American stealth bomber of the United States Air Force
- Avro Vulcan B2, the Mark 2 version of a Royal Air Force V-Bomber aircraft
- Any Mark 2 bomber aircraft under the British military aircraft designation systems

=== Locomotives ===
- Alsace-Lorraine B 2, an Alsace-Lorraine P 1 class steam locomotive
- Bavarian B II, an 1851 German steam locomotive model
- GS&WR Class B2, a Great Southern and Western Railway Irish steam locomotive
- LB&SCR B2 class, a British LB&SCR locomotive class
- GCR Class 1, classified B2 during ownership, reclassified B19 in 1945
- LNER Thompson Class B2, a British class of 4-6-0 steam locomotives rebuilt from B17s
- NCC Class B2, a Northern Counties Committee Irish steam locomotive

=== Submarines ===
- HMS B2, a B-class submarine of the British Royal Navy
- Spanish submarine B-2, a B-class submarine of the Spanish Navy
- USS B-2 (SS-11), a B-class submarine of the United States Navy

=== Other transport ===
- B2 (New York City bus) serving Brooklyn
- B2-class Melbourne tram
- Belavia Belarusian Airlines (IATA airline designator code B2)
- Ceylon Government Railway B2, a steam locomotive class
- Marussia B2, a high-performance luxury sports coupé built by Russian automaker Marussia Motors
- Guangzhou Metro CSR-Zhuzhou Class B EMU, internal callsign B2 for the first batch

== Computing ==
- b2/cafelog, the precursor to the WordPress blogging software
- B2evolution, a multi-lingual, multi-user, multi-blog publishing system forked from b2/cafelog
- B2, a subclass of security level B as defined by Trusted Computer System Evaluation Criteria (TCSEC) standards
- B2, a cloud-based object storage service provided by Backblaze

== People and characters ==
- B2, the name of a character from the Dutch television series Bassie en Adriaan
- B-2 or B² (B squared), the stage name used by wrestler Barry Buchanan
- B2, one of a pair of bananas featured in the children's television show Bananas in Pyjamas
- Birch Bayh (Birch Evans Bayh II)

== Visas ==
- South Korea B-2 visa, a tourist or transit visa granted by South Korea
- United States B-2 visa, a non-immigrant visa granted by the United States of America

== Biology ==
- ATC code B02 Antihemorrhagics, a subgroup of the Anatomical Therapeutic Chemical Classification System
- Bradykinin receptor B_{2}, a human gene
- Proanthocyanidin B2, a B type proanthocyanidin
- Thromboxane B2, an inactive metabolite/product of thromboxane A2
- Vitamin B_{2}

== Other ==
- B2, a postcode area in central Birmingham
- B2 basketball league (Albania); see Albanian Basketball League
- B2, an international standard paper size defined in ISO 216 measuring 500 mm × 707 mm
- B2, a level in the Common European Framework of Reference for Languages
- B2, a code used by the land use planning system in the UK
- B2 star, a subclass of bluish-white B-class stars
- B02, Alekhine's Defence chess code
- B2 dye, also known as dyesol
- B2 (classification), a Paralympic disability classification
- Bi-2, a Russian rock band
- B2 intermetallic compound with equal numbers of atoms of two metals
- B2, an advanced model of battle droid in the Star Wars franchise
- B2, a brand of Canadian retailer Browns Shoes
- b2, a common nickname or abbreviation of bilibili used on the English Internet.

== See also ==
- 2B (disambiguation)
- BII (disambiguation)
- BTO (disambiguation)
