= B-2 status =

B-2 status can refer to:

- A tourist or transit visa granted by South Korea
- A tourist visa granted by the United States of America

== See also ==
- B2 (disambiguation), for other meanings of B-2
- B-2, for the current stealth bomber status
