= Fokker B.II =

The designation B.II was used for two completely unrelated aircraft produced by Fokker:

- The Fokker M.10s flown by Austria-Hungary during World War I (named B.II by the Austro-Hungarian military)
- A biplane flying boat flown by the Dutch Navy in the 1920s (named B.II by Fokker)
