= BTO =

BTO or bto may refer to:

== Places ==
- Betchworth railway station (station code BTO), Surrey, England
- Bhitaura railway station (station code BTO), Fatehganj Pashchimi, Bareilly, Uttar Pradesh, India
- Botopasi Airstrip (IATA airport code: BTO), Botopasi, Suriname

== Chemicals, drugs, substances ==
- Barium titanate (formally BaTiO), a compound with the formula BaTiO_{3}
- Bismuth titanate (formally BiTiO), a set of compounds with varying formulae [ Bi_{12}TiO_{20} or Bi_{4}Ti_{3}O_{12} or Bi_{2}Ti_{2}O_{7} ]

== Groups, organizations, companies ==
- Bachman–Turner Overdrive, a Canadian rock band
- Boston Typewriter Orchestra, a musical comedic performing group
- British Trust for Ornithology
- Brussels Treaty Organisation, an organisation established to implement the 1948 Treaty of Brussels
- Biological Technologies Office (DARPA), one of the seven technical specialty offices under the US Defense Advanced Research Projects Agency

== Other uses ==
- BRENDA tissue ontology, an encyclopedia of enzyme sources
- Build to order, an order-fulfillment strategy
- Build to order (HDB), a purchasing arrangement for new Singapore Housing Development Board apartments
- Rinconada Bikol language (ISO 639-3 language code: bto)
- Bachman-Turner Overdrive (1973 album), the debut studio album by the band of the same name
  - Bachman-Turner Overdrive (1984 album), their ninth studio album

== See also ==
- B2 (disambiguation)
