= IIB =

IIB or IIb may refer to:

- IIb, a diamond type
- IIb, a type of type II supernova
- Intergranular and Interphase Boundaries (IIB) in Materials, a series of triennial international conferences which started in Paris (France) in 1989
- International Investment Bank, a multilateral development bank
- "Ice Ice Baby", a hip hop song written by American rapper Vanilla Ice
- International Patent Institute (Institut International des Brevets), an intellectual property organisation established on June 6, 1947, now defunct
- Islamic International Brigade, an international unit of Islamist mujahideen founded in 1998
- KBC Bank Ireland, (established in 1973 as Irish Intercontinental Bank), one of the leading non-retail banks in Ireland
- Type II string theory (type IIB), described by type IIB supergravity in ten dimensions
- IBM Integration Bus, an enterprise service bus software product by IBM
- A rating in the Hong Kong motion picture rating system

== See also ==
- 2B (disambiguation), including a list of topics named II-B, etc.
