= 2B (disambiguation) =

2B is a character and one of the protagonists of the 2017 video game Nier: Automata.

2B or 2-B may also refer to:

== Science ==
- IARC group 2B
- Type IIB string theory, a physical theory about the basic substance of the universe
- II-b or IIb, a subtype of Type II supernova
- Transcription factor II B, a type of protein structure
- Type IIb diamond, a classification of natural diamonds
- Alpha-2B adrenergic receptor, a type of protein structure

== Sports and entertainment ==
- 2B (band), a Portuguese band
- 2B (film), a 2009 science fiction film
- 2b Theatre Company, a theatre company in Halifax, Nova Scotia
- Second baseman, a fielding position in baseball
- Double (baseball), a type of base hit

== Other uses ==
- 2B lead, a grading of pencil hardness
- Aerocondor, IATA airline code 2B
- Haute-Corse, French department 2B (northern Corsica)
- Stalag II-B, a prisoner of war camp in Germany

== See also ==
- B2 (disambiguation)
- IIB (disambiguation)
- To Be (disambiguation)
