= To Be =

To be is a copula, a word used to link the subject of a sentence with a predicate (a subject complement).

To Be may also refer to:

- To Be (album), a 1997 album by Karen Mok
- To Be (film), a 1990 short animation film by John Weldon
- "To Be" (song), a 1999 song by Ayumi Hamasaki
- "To Be", a song by Blue October from their 2013 album Sway

== See also ==
- 2B (disambiguation)
- Being (disambiguation)
- "To be, or not to be", a quotation from Hamlet
