= Fatehganj Pashchimi =

Fatehganj Pashchimi (West)
- Town
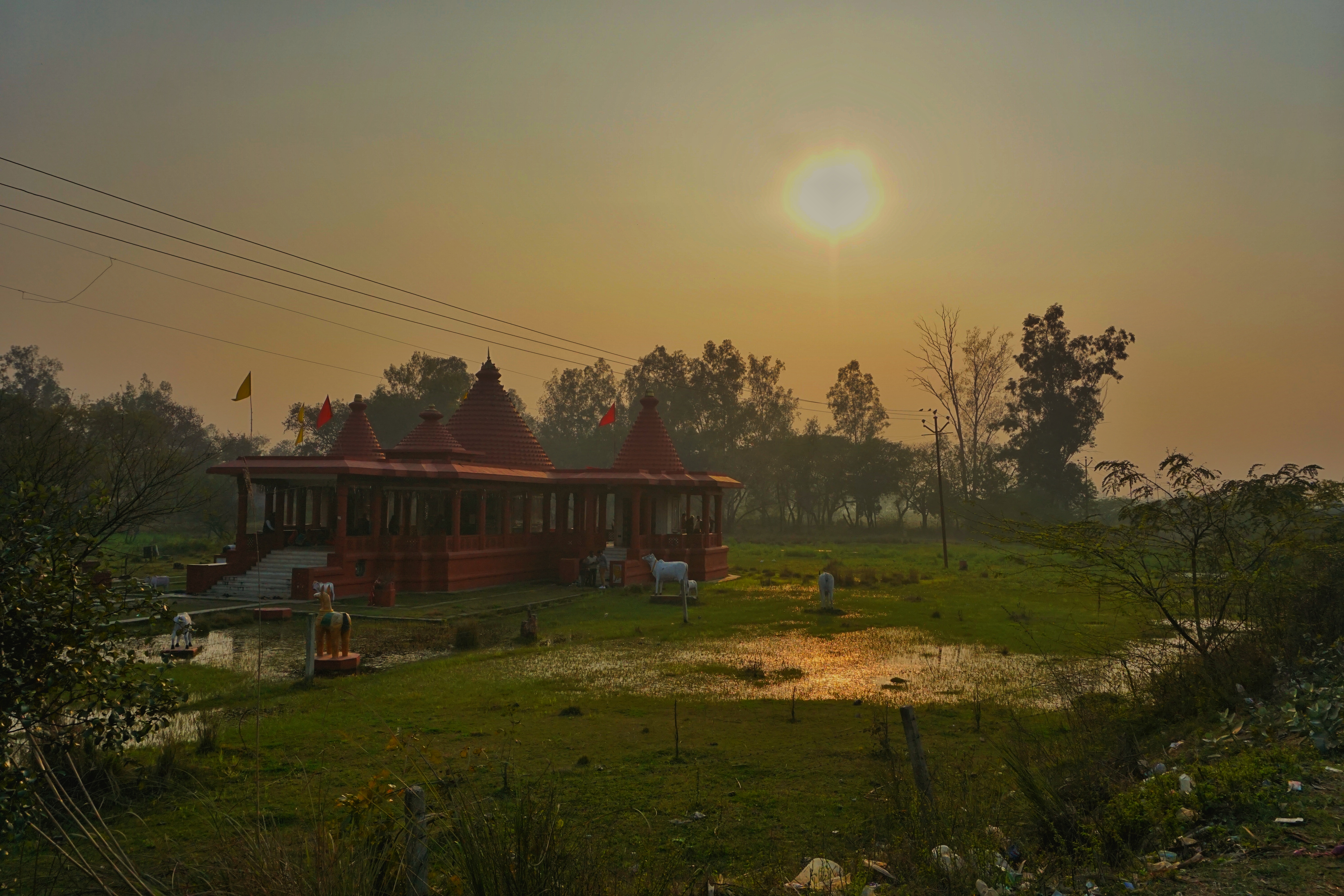
- Radha Krishna temple on NH 24

- Location in Uttar Pradesh, India Fatehganj Pashchimi (West) (India)
- Coordinates: 28.463°N 79.306°E
- Country: India
- State: Uttar Pradesh
- District: Bareilly
- Elevation: 260 m (850 ft)

Population (2001)
  - Total: 20,811

Languages
  - Official: Hindi
- Time zone: UTC+5:30 (IST)
- PIN: 243501
- Telephone code: 244041
- Vehicle registration: UP 25
- Website: up.gov.in

Fatehganj Pashchimi (or Fatehganj West) is a town and a nagar panchayat in Bareilly district in the state of Uttar Pradesh, India.

== History ==
The town was given the name Fatehganj following the British-Oudh victory over the Rohilla insurgents of Rampur in the Batlle of Bhitaura and subsequently the Second Rohilla War (1794). Prior to the war, two separate villages existed in the area - Bhitaura and Naugaon - both were merged and fatehganj town was founded. An obelisk of chunar sandstone was erected in the town by the British Indian government in honour of the fourteen officers and other soldiers, who fell in the battle. Tombs of Rohilla Chiefs Najib Khan and Buland Khan, who lost their lives in the same battle, were also built in the town.

== Demographics ==
As of 2001 India census, Fatehganj Pashchimi had a population of 20,811. Males constitute 53% of the population and females 47%. Fatehganj Pashchimi has an average literacy rate of 67%, higher than the national average of 64%: male literacy is 74%, and female literacy is 59%. In Fatehganj Pashchimi, 10% of the population is under 6 years of age.

== Location ==
Fatehganj Pashchimi is located on the NH 530, about 24 kilometres (15 mi) northwest of Bareilly city.

== Industries ==
The area nearby produces mentha, sugar and rice. There are many agro-based industries located there. The town is served by the Bhitaura railway station.
