= National Highway 530 (India) =

National highway in India

National Highway 530
- Map of National Highway 530 in red

Route information
- Auxiliary route of NH 30
- Length: 140 km (87 mi)

Major junctions
- From: NH 9 in Rampur, Uttarakhand
- To: NH 21 / NH 30 in Bareilly, Uttarakhand

Location
- Country: India
- States: Uttar Pradesh

Highway system
- Roads in India; Expressways; National; State; Asian
← NH 109	→ NH 9

National Highway 530 (NH 530) is a National Highway in India. It runs from Pantnagar in Uttarakhand with Rampur covering 140 kilometres (87 mi) distance.

== Route ==
NH530 connects Rampur to Pantnagar in Uttarakhand via Milak, Mirganj and Fatehganj, Bareilly Bypass, Bhojipura Junction, Baheri, Kichha. As of 2023–24, Uttar Pradesh State Highway 37 also known as Nainital Road is included in NH530.

Before renumbering, the whole route constituted a part of NH24.

== Image Gallery ==
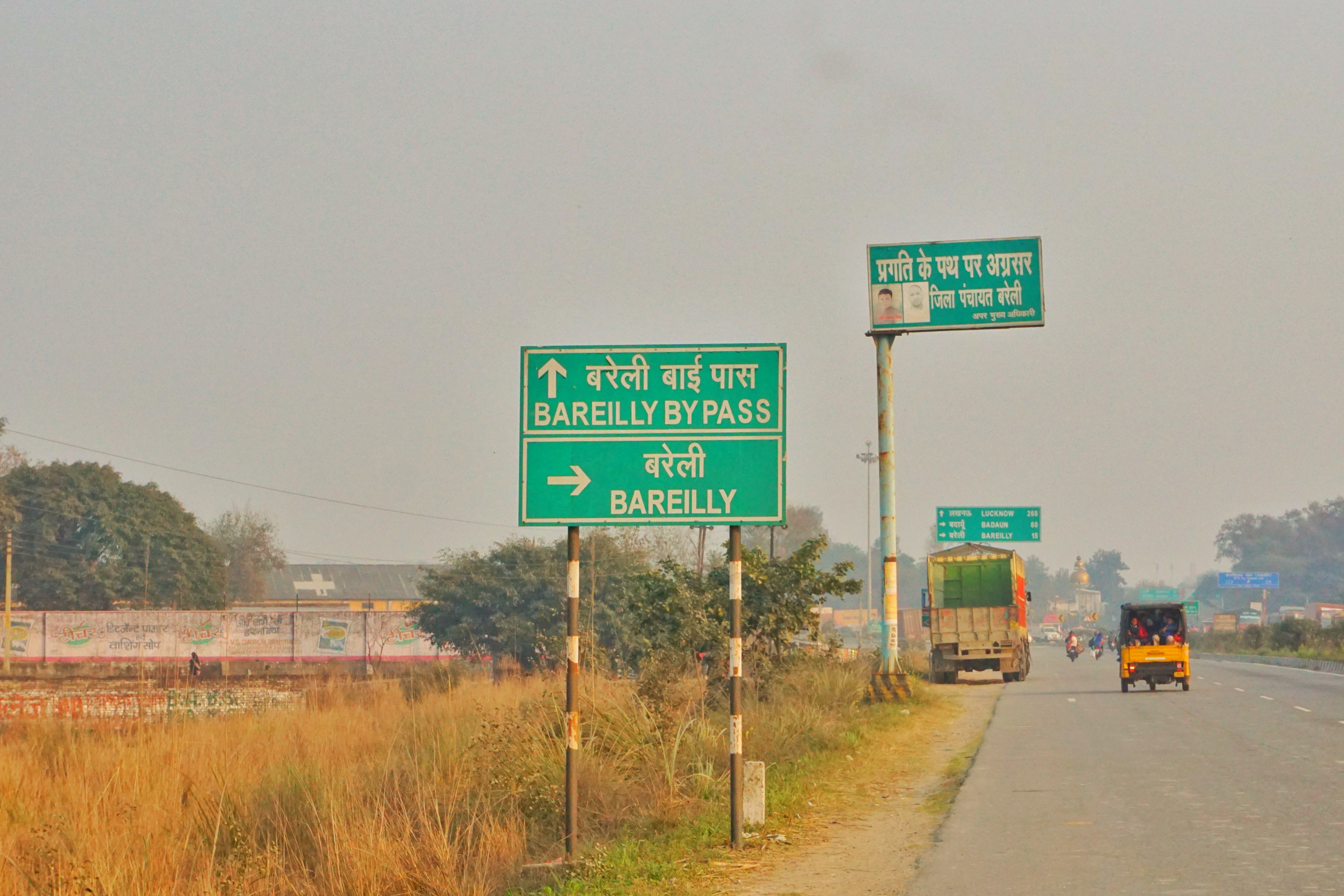
NH 530 at Bareilly

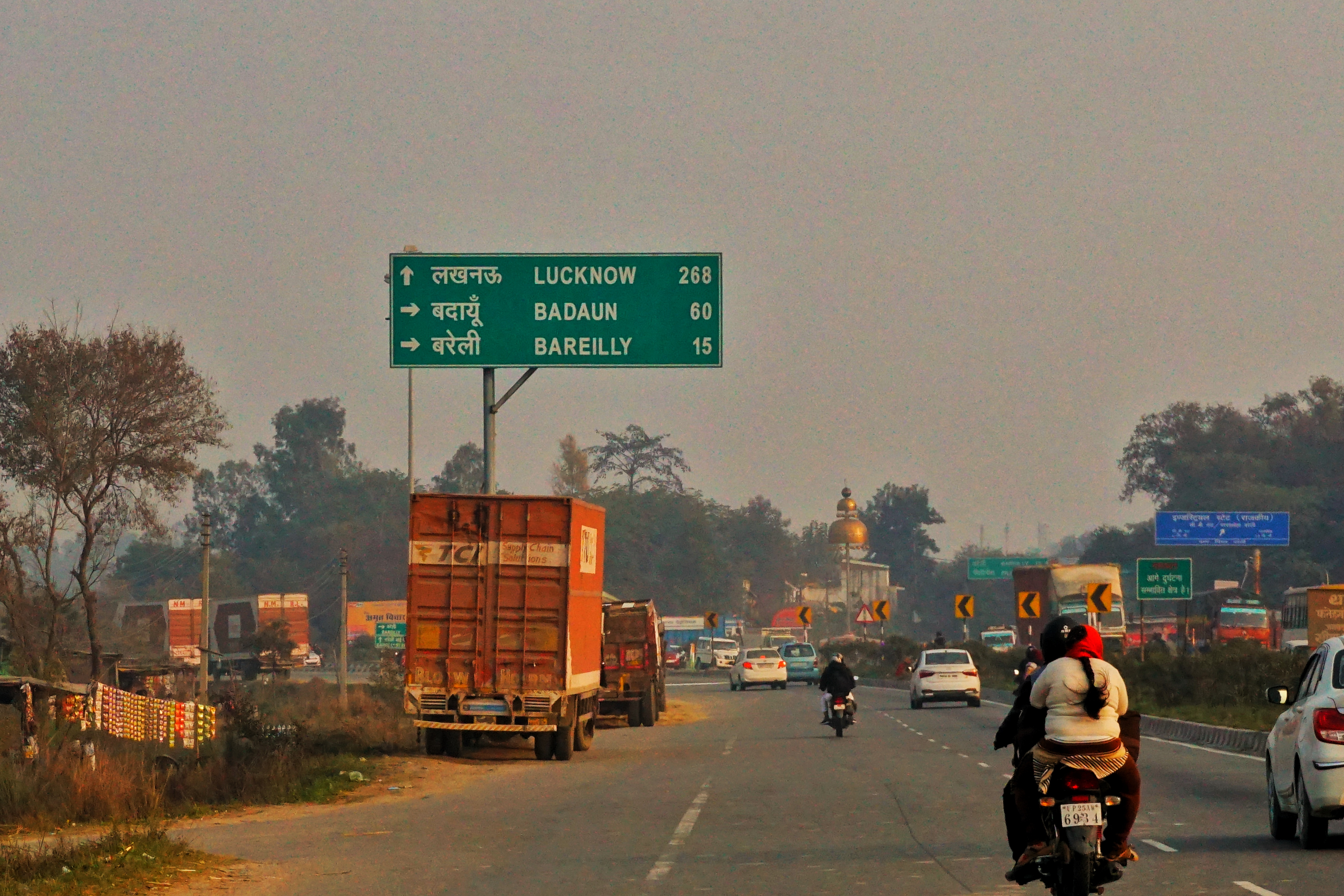
NH 530 at Bareilly
