= Fokker B.I =

The designation B.I was used for two completely unrelated aircraft produced by Fokker:

- The Fokker M.7s flown by Austria-Hungary during World War I (named B.I by the Austro-Hungarian military)
- A biplane flying boat flown by the Dutch East Indies Naval Air Force in the 1920s (named B.I by Fokker)
