= Bhitaura railway station =

Railway station in Uttar Pradesh

- Indian Railways logo

General information
- Location: Fatehganj Pashchimi, Bareilly, Uttar Pradesh; India
- Coordinates: 28.4702°N 79.3064°E
- Elevation: 173 metres (568 ft)
- System: Indian Railways station
- Owner: Indian Railways
- Operator: Northern Railway
- Line: Lucknow–Moradabad line
- Platforms: 2
- Tracks: 4
- Connections: Auto stand

Construction
- Structure type: Standard (on-ground station)
- Parking: No
- Cycle facilities: No

Other information
- Station code: BTO
- Zone(s): Northern Railway
- Division(s): Moradabad
Location
- Location within Uttar Pradesh Location within India

Bhitaura railway station (station code: BTO) is a railway station on the Lucknow–Moradabad line located in the town of Fatehganj Pashchimi in Bareilly, Uttar Pradesh, India. It is under the administrative control of the Moradabad Division of the Northern Railway zone of the Indian Railways.

The station consists of two platforms, and is located at a distance of 18 kilometres (11 mi) from Bareilly Junction. Three trains (Two Passenger / One Express) stop at the station.
