= Fokker M.7 =

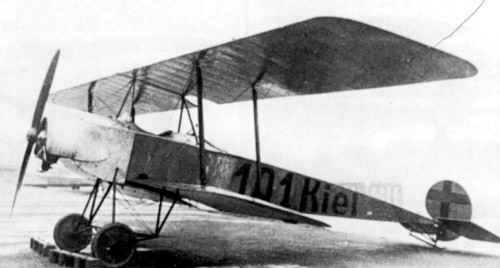

General information
- Type: Observation aircraft
- National origin: Germany
- Manufacturer: Fokker-Flugzeugwerke
- Primary users: Kaiserliche Marine Imperial and Royal Aviation Troops
- Number built: 36

History
- Manufactured: 1915–1916
- Retired: 1918
- Developed from: Fokker M.6
- Variants: Fokker M.10

The Fokker M.7 was an unarmed German biplane observation aircraft developed during the First World War by the Fokker-Flugzeugwerke (Fokker Aircraft Company) for the Imperial German Navy's (Kaiserliche Marine) Naval Air Service (Marine-Fliegerabteilung) during the First World War. First flown in 1915, it was used by the armed forces of Germany and Austro-Hungary. As the M.7 became obsolete, it was relegated to training duties.

== Background and description ==
The Naval Air Service and the Imperial German Army's (Deutsches Heer) Imperial German Air Service (Fliegertruppen des deutschen Kaiserreiches) wanted improved, but differing, versions of the M.6. Fokker only had the resources to design and build one type at a time and the much larger orders by the Imperial German Air Service for what became the M.8 gave them priority. The Naval Air Service initially placed an order for seven aircraft, but tripled this while awaiting for production of the M.7 to begin. The Austro-Hungarian Aviation Troops (Kaiserliche und Königliche Luftfahrtruppen) placed an order for 12 aircraft on 20 September 1914 and followed it up with an order for four repaired M.7s without engines on 6 May 1915.

To meet the Navy's requirements for coastal defense duties, Anthony Fokker widened the M.7's fuselage to give the crew more room and converted the aircraft into a one-bay sesquiplane of conventional configuration, with slightly staggered wings using wing warping for roll control and tandem open cockpits with the pilot in front. He retained the M.7's 80-metric-horsepower (59 kW) Oberursel U.0 rotary engine. The aircraft used welded-steel tubes for the fuselage and tail structures and wood for the wings, all of which were covered by doped fabric.

The prototype was completed in January 1915 and flight testing revealed that the upper wing and wire bracing needed to be reinforced. The additional weight of the modifications reduced the performance of the production models. The Imperial Air Service ordered three aircraft, almost certainly using them for training. The Austro-Hungarians began to receive their aircraft in January–February and the last one was received in January 1916. They were used on all fronts as reconnaissance aircraft. The surviving aircraft were relegated to training duties in early 1916; seven of these were still in service on 31 August 1918.

The W.4 was a floatplane version of the M.7. Fokker reused the floats from his unsuccessful W.2 and W.3 on one of the Navy's M.7s and replaced its wings with larger two-bay ones. Despite the additional lift, the aircraft could not take off and it was returned to its original configuration and used as a training aircraft.

== Variants ==
- M.7 : Two-seat reconnaissance aircraft version.
- W.4 : Two-seat reconnaissance floatplane version.

== Operators ==
- Austria-Hungary
  - Imperial and Royal Aviation Troops
- German Empire
  - Naval Air Service
  - Imperial German Air Service

== Specifications (M.7) ==
Data from Fokker Aircraft of WWI: A Centennial Perspective on Great War Airplanes: Volume 1: Spinne – M.10 & Watercraft

General characteristics

- Crew: two, pilot and observer
- Length: 8 m (26 ft 3 in)
- Upper wingspan: 11.7 m (38 ft 5 in)
- Lower wingspan: 7.2 m (23 ft 7 in)
- Height: 2.95 m (9 ft 8 in)
- Wing area: 26 m^{2} (280 sq ft)
- Empty weight: 380 kg (838 lb)
- Gross weight: 679 kg (1,497 lb)
- Powerplant: 1 × Oberursel U.0 , 60 kW (80 hp)
- Propellers: 2-bladed

Performance

- Maximum speed: 130 km/h (81 mph, 70 kn)
- Time to altitude: 8 minutes to 1,000 m (3,300 ft)
- 15.5 minutes to 2,000 m (6,600 ft)

== Bibliography ==
- Gray, Peter & Thetford, Owen (1987) [1970]. German Aircraft of the First World War (2nd ed.). London: Putnam. ISBN 0-85177-809-7.
- Grosz, Peter Michael; Haddow, George & Schiemer, Peter (1993). Austro-Hungarian Army Aircraft of World War One. Mountain View, California: Flying Machines Press. ISBN 0-9637110-0-8.
- Herris, Jack (2020). Fokker Aircraft of WWI: Spinne–M.10 & Watercraft: A Centennial Perspective on Great War Airplanes. Great War Aviation Centennial Series No.51. Vol. I. n.p.: Aeronaut Books. ISBN 978-1-953201-05-8.
- Leaman, Paul (2001). Fokker Aircraft of World War One. Marlborough, UK: Crowood Press. ISBN 1-86126-353-8.
