= Fokker M.6 =

M.6
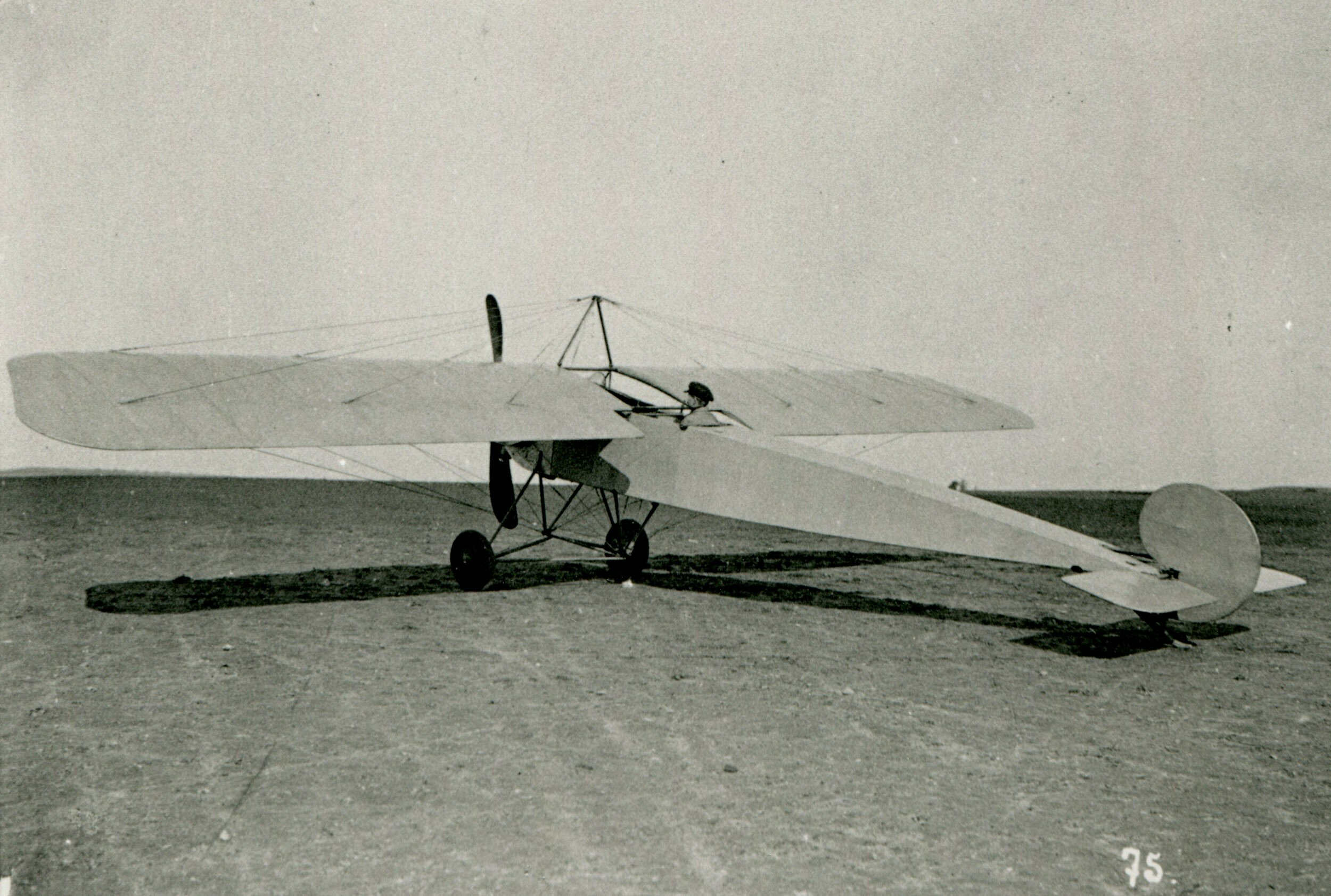
- Rear oblique view of the M.6 showing the gap between the fuselage and wing

General information
- Type: Experimental aircraft
- Manufacturer: Fokker
- Designer: Anthony Fokker
- Number built: 1

History
- First flight: June 1914

The Fokker M.6 was a German two-seat experimental monoplane derived from the M.5 that was built for the Imperial German Army's (Deutsches Heer) Imperial German Air Service (Fliegertruppen des deutschen Kaiserreiches) by the Fokker Aircraft Company (Fokker-Flugzeugwerke) in 1914, shortly before the beginning of the First World War. It fatally crashed after a few test flights. Only one aircraft had been built and development was not continued.

== Background and description ==
The Imperial German Air Service had realized that single-seat reconnaissance aircraft were severely hampered by the pilot's need to fly the aircraft and to observe the ground, making notes about what he saw. Its Inspectorate of Flying Troops (Inspektion der Fliegertruppen (Idflieg) suggested that aircraft manufacturers should develop aircraft with a permanent seat for an observer to allow the pilot to concentrate on flying the aircraft while the observer studied the ground. Anthony Fokker slightly lengthened his single-seat M.5 to accommodate an observer in the rear seat, although the elongated cockpit was cramped and uncomfortable for both men with the rear wing spar passing through the cockpit, between the two seats. He also deleted the fabric covering the wing root and raised the leading edge of the wing 40 centimeters (16 in) to improve downwards visibility. The M.6 retained the same 80-metric-horsepower (59 kW) Oberursel U.0 rotary engine as the M.5.

The M.6 first flew in June 1914 and proved to be underpowered. The modifications to the wing also did not improve visibility as much as had been anticipated. The aircraft was evaluated by the Imperial German Air Service that month but it crashed after those tests when the pilot mistakenly turned off the fuel valve on 23 June. The pilot was killed and his observer fractured his femur. The crash terminated any further development of the M.6.

== Bibliography ==
- Herris, Jack (2020). Fokker Aircraft of WWI: Volume I: Spinne–M.10 & Watercraft: A Centennial Perspective on Great War Airplanes. Great War Aviation Centennial Series. Vol. 51. n.p.: Aeronaut Books. ISBN 978-1-953201-05-8.
- Leaman, Paul (2001). Fokker Aircraft of World War One. Marlborough, UK: Crowood Press. ISBN 1-86126-353-8.
