= Browns Shoes =

Canadian footwear retailer

Browns Shoes Inc.

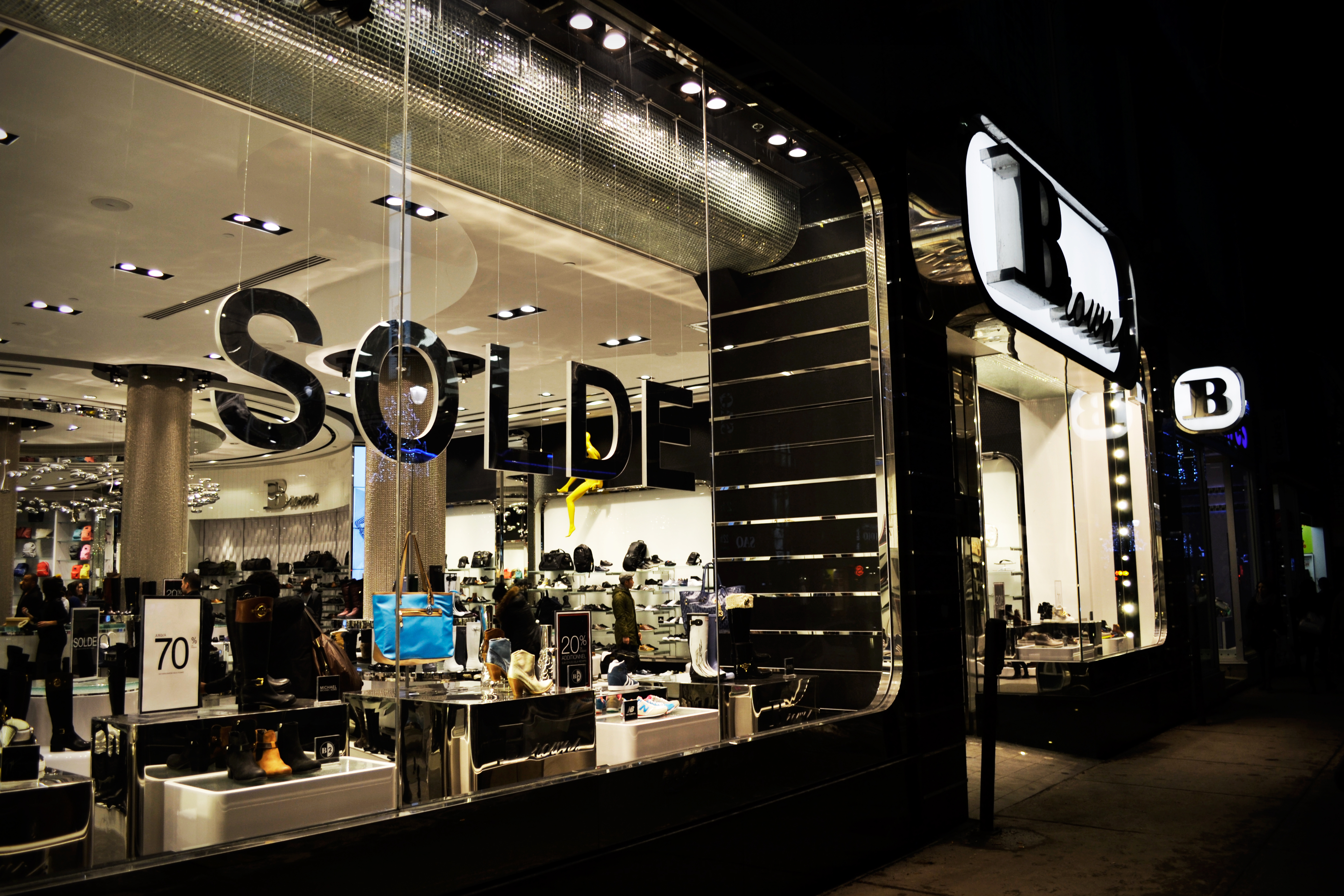
- Browns shoes location in Montreal
- Type: Private
- Industry: Retail Manufacturing Shoes
- Founded: 1940 in Montreal, Quebec
- Founder: Benjamin Brownstein
- Headquarters: 2255, rue Cohen; Montreal, Quebec; H4R 2N7
- Number of locations: 72
- Number of employees: 500-1000
- Website: brownsshoes.com

Browns Shoes Inc. is a Canadian fashion footwear retailer that owns and operates 72 stores across Canada under a variety of footwear brands. The company's headquarters is based in Quebec, in the Montreal borough of Saint-Laurent.

== History ==
Browns Shoes was founded in Montreal in 1940 by Benjamin Brownstein, who immigrated to Montreal at the age of 15 from Romania. The original Browns Shoes location, on Saint Catherine Street in downtown Montreal, burned down in 1954. After the fire, Benjamin's son, Morton Brownstein, took over the family business. Morton Brownstein was born on January 12, 1928, to Benjamin and Minnie Brownstein. Upon graduating from high school, Morton worked at his father's department store on Montreal's St. Lawrence Boulevard. Morton married Bernice Greenfield, whom he met at the age of 13 at the Strathcona Academy in Outremont. Together, they had three children –Michael, Janis and Cheryl. After taking over the family business in 1954, Morton decided to take Browns into a different direction toward exclusive designer and fashion footwear. In 1959, he became the first North American retailer to bring Italian-made shoes to Canada. Today, Browns Shoes is a nationwide shoe retailer, with 72 stores across Canada. Morton Brownstein remained the company's president until 1999, when he ceded the presidency of the company to his son, Michael. On May 23, 2013, Morton Brownstein died at the age of 86 at his home in Westmount, Quebec.

== Business operation ==
Browns Shoes is a fashion retailer that operates 72 stores across Canada under the Browns, B2 and Browns OUTLET banners. The company was founded in Montreal in 1940 by Benjamin Brownstein. Today, a third generation leads the business which employs close to 1000 employees nationwide. Browns' shoes have been seen on prominent Canadian celebrities and personalities such as model Coco Rocha, Montreal Canadien Mike Cammalleri, as well as Ben Mulroney and Tanya Kim from E-TALK Canada, for which Browns is the official footwear supplier. The latest Fall / Winter 2013 Campaign featured Canadian model Coco Rocha, Czech model Petra Nemcova, and Brazilian model Marlon Teixeira.

== Community role ==
Morton Brownstein was especially known for his philanthropy, his generosity and his charity work, receiving several honors such as Entrepreneur of the Year in 1995 and the Queen's Diamond Jubilee Award in 2002. And also, in July 2004, Morton Brownstein was appointed to the Order of Canada. In 1984, Morton Brownstein raised $20 million for the Montreal Jewish General Hospital's emergency department, which was eventually named after him and his wife, Bernice. In 2003, he raised his largest contribution of $200 million. In 2009, he received the hospital's Lifetime Achievement Award and, in 2012, was named director emeritus. Today, Browns Shoes carries on the charitable work of its past president, Morton Brownstein. The company continues to donate 10% of its pretax profits to various Montreal charities, such as the Club des Petits Déjeuners in Montreal, an organization that provides breakfast for students at schools in underprivileged areas of the city.

== Products and brands ==
Browns specializes in footwear for women, men and children. In addition to carrying a large selection of brands such as Michael Kors, Stuart Weitzman and Giuseppe Zanotti, Browns also carries a range of exclusive collections, which are trademarks registered to Browns, and, thus, manufactured by Browns under assumed brand names: Mimosa, Browns Couture, The Wishbone Collection, Luca Del Forte, Intensi, Artica and B2. These shoes are made mostly in China, wherein some of these brands are manufactured in countries classified by the Walk Free Global Slavery Index as having a higher prevalence of forced or child labour.
