= Kondor B.I =

WWI German training aircraft

B.I
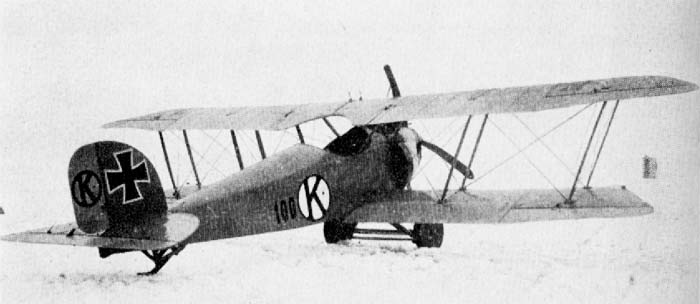

General information
- Type: Trainer aircraft
- National origin: Germany
- Manufacturer: Kondor Flugzeugwerke, Essen
- Designer: Walter Rethel

History
- First flight: January 1918

The Kondor B.I was a German two seat, biplane training aircraft designed and built close to the end of World War I.

== Design and development ==
The Kondor B.I was built as a trainer aircraft of all-wood construction at the end of 1917. It was revolutionary in terms of reducing the number of parts necessary for the assembly of the aircraft to a minimum.

The first flight of the aircraft took place in January 1918. After successful test flights, a small batch of B.Is was ordered.

== Specifications ==
Data from

General characteristics

- Crew: One
- Length: 6.85 m (22 ft 6 in)
- Wingspan: 9.50 m (31 ft 2 in)
- Empty weight: 806 kg (1,777 lb)
- Gross weight: 1,150 kg (2,535 lb)
- Powerplant: 1 × Mercedes D.II 6-cylinder, liquid-cooled inline engine, 89 kW (120 hp)
- Propellers: 2-bladed wooden fixed-pitch propeller
