= List of South Korean visas =

This is a list of visas issued by South Korea. The government of South Korea, through the Ministry of Justice's "Korea Immigration Service," issues one of these visas to all non-citizens entering the country. In 2005, 5,179,848 visas were issued, not including military and landing-permit visas, a slight increase over the previous year. More than half of these were layover/B-2 visas. In 2017, 12,573,021 visas were issued.

== A visas ==
| Category | Name | Number of visas issued | | | |
| Category | Name | 2005 | 2010 | 2013 | 2017 |
|---|---|---|---|---|---|
| A-1 | Diplomat (외교) | 7,070 | 8,001 | 11,067 | 15,011 |
| A-2 | Government official (공무) | 11,854 | 13,753 | 17,819 | 30,759 |
| A-3 | Agreement (협정) | 27,946 | 92,450 | N/A | N/A |

A-3 visa is issued to United States Forces Korea non-military personnels with Status of Forces Agreement status. This includes family members, civilians, and newborns associated with the United States Forces Korea. Active duty military of the United States Forces Korea use their common access card and orders to enter South Korea.

== B visas ==
| Category | Name | Number of visas issued | | | |
| Category | Name | 2005 | 2010 | 2013 | 2017 |
|---|---|---|---|---|---|
| B-1 | Visa exemption (사증면제) | 496,356 | 803,617 | 1,090,907 | 1,634,095 |
| B-2 | Tourist/transit (관광통과) | 3,404,923 | 4,601,828 | 5,040,354 | 5,269,825 |

- B-2-1: Tourist/Transit (General)
- B-2-2: Tourist/Transit (Jeju); visiting Jeju Island within 30 days

The B-2 status allows travelers who are passport holders of various jurisdictions, including the Mainland China, to stay in South Korea for a maximum period of 30 days, provided that they are using Incheon International Airport as a transit stopover. It applies to ordinary PRC passport bearers when they are travelling between the mainland China and Canada, the United States, Australia, New Zealand, Japan or 30 European countries. The B-2 status is encoded in Article 7 of the South Korean immigration law.

== C visas ==
| Category | Name | Number of visas issued | | | |
| Category | Name | 2005 | 2010 | 2013 | 2017 |
|---|---|---|---|---|---|
| C-1 | Temporary news coverage (일시취재) | 2,217 | 2,212 | 1,323 | 1,130 |
| C-2 | Short-term business (단기상용) | 214,621 | 224,574 | N/A | N/A |
| C-3 | Short-term visit (단기방문) | 444,822 | 959,374 | 2,728,573 | 3,319,579 |
| C-4 | Short-term employee (단기취업) | 11,944 | 12,888 | 10,736 | 20,617 |

- C-3-1: Short-term General
- C-3-2: Group Tourist
- C-3-3: Medical Tourist; enter Korea for medical treatment
- C-3-4: Business Visitor (General)
- C-3-5: Business Visitor (Agreement); short-term business in accordance with an agreement with ROK
- C-3-6: Business Visitor (Sponsored); invited by a company or an organization designated by the Minister of Justice of ROK
- C-3-8: Short-term Visitor for overseas Koreans
- C-3-9: Ordinary Tourist
- C-3-10: Airside Direct Transit

== D visas ==
| Category | Name | Number of visas issued | | | |
| Category | Name | 2005 | 2010 | 2013 | 2017 |
|---|---|---|---|---|---|
| D-1 | Artist (문화예술) | 241 | 277 | 196 | 292 |
| D-2 | Students (유학) | 25,635 | 106,961 | 114,818 | 212,295 |
| D-3 | Industrial trainee (산업연수) | 41,365 | 2,274 | 1,806 | 2,705 |
| D-4 | General trainee (일반연수) | 10,257 | 30,938 | 37,282 | 90,357 |
| D-5 | Journalism (취재) | 379 | 315 | 398 | 497 |
| D-6 | Religion (종교) | 2,086 | 2,346 | 2,362 | 2,428 |
| D-7 | Intra-Company Transfer (주재) | 8,369 | 7,930 | 9,234 | 8,548 |
| D-8 | Corporate investor (기업투자) | 35,712 | 37,966 | 39,859 | 41,984 |
| D-9 | International trade (무역경영) | 5,917 | 16,848 | 32,326 | 18,288 |
| D-10 | Job Seeking (구직) | N/A | 11 | 5,482 | 12,024 |

- D-2-1: Associate Degree
- D-2-2: Bachelor's Degree
- D-2-3: Master's Degree
- D-2-4: Doctoral Degree
- D-2-5: Research Study
- D-2-6: Exchange Student
- D-2-7: Student Invited by the Korean Government
- D-2-8: Short Term Study
- D-3-11: Industrial Trainee
- D-3-12: Industrial Trainee (Technology); who plans to receive a training at a technology-exporting entity which the need of the training at the entity acknowledged by the Minister of Justice of ROK
- D-3-13: Industrial Trainee (Plant)
- D-3-14: Industrial Trainee (Others)
- D-4-1: Korean Language Trainee; A person with at least high school diploma or the equivalent, or a current student of high school or below, who plans to study Korean language at an academic institution affiliated with a foreign academic institution in ROK
- D-4-2: General Trainee (Others)
- D-4-3: Elementary/Middle/High School Student
- D-4-5: Trainee Chef (Korean Cuisine)
- D-4-6: General Trainee (Private Institute); who plans to receive training at a private academic institute with an outstanding performance
- D-4-7: Foreign Language Trainee
- D-8-1: Establishing a Local Business
- D-8-2: Venture Capital
- D-8-3: Unincorporated Enterprise
- D-8-4: Technology and Business Start-up
- D-10-1: Job Seeker; A person who plans to engage in a training or find a job in a field qualified for a visa of Professor (E-1), Foreign Language Instructor (E-2), Research (E-3), Technical Instructor/Technician (E-4), Professional (E-5), Artist/Athlete (E-6), and Foreign National of Special Ability (E-7); The activities not only include a job seeking or on-the-job training (including short-term paid internship) at an organization or company in ROK; The activities related to Artist/Athlete (E-6) status only includes pure art or sports, and excludes adult entertainment businesses.
- D-10-2: Business Startup

== E visas ==
| Category | Name | Number of visas issued | | | |
| Category | Name | 2005 | 2010 | 2013 | 2017 |
|---|---|---|---|---|---|
| E-1 | Professor (교수) | 3,204 | 7,454 | 8,186 | 7,491 |
| E-2 | Foreign language instructor (회화지도) | 12,439 | 47,405 | 38,572 | 30,922 |
| E-3 | Research (연구) | 5,406 | 7,829 | 9,223 | 9,618 |
| E-4 | Technology transfer (기술지도) | 819 | 1,252 | 1,122 | 1,345 |
| E-5 | Professional employment (전문직업) | 581 | 1,406 | 1,978 | 2,206 |
| E-6 | Culture and Entertainment (문화, 엔터테인먼트) | 4,759 | 4,183 | 4,368 | 3,765 |
| E-7 | Designated activities (특정활동) | 13,514 | 24,525 | 36,904 | 47,528 |
| E-8 | Training employment (연수취업) | N/A | 5 | N/A | N/A |
| E-9 | Non-professional employment (비전문취업) | 38,244 | 82,099 | 105,738 | 140,072 |
| E-10 | Crew employee (선원취업) | N/A | 7,084 | 8,281 | 10,720 |

- E-2-1: Foreign Language Instructor (General); plans to teach "conversational language" at a foreign language institute, affiliated- language research institute or educational institute of higher than elementary school, or language training institute affiliated with an enterprise or broadcasting company, or other equivalent organization.
- E-2-2: Teaching Assistant; signed an employment contract with the Minister of Education (or superintendent of a school district) to teach foreign language at an elementary, middle, or high school as an assistant teacher
- E-2-91: Foreign Language Instructor (by FTA); who meets the qualifications of the Agreement between the parties involved, and plans to teach conversational language at a foreign language institute, affiliated- language research institute or educational institute of higher than elementary school, or language training institute affiliated with an enterprise or broadcasting company, or other equivalent organization.
- E-6-1: Artist; plans to engage in profitable activities such as music, fine arts, and literature, or professional acting, or professional entertainment activities in accordance with the Public Performance Act
- E-6-2: Hotel and Adult Entertainment; engage in performance or entertainment activities at hotel business facilities and adult entertainment facilities in accordance with Tourism Promotion Acts. (Any form of activities such as music, fine arts, and literature, professional acting, or professional entertainment in accordance with the Public Performance Act are not included.)
- E-6-3: Athlete
- E-7-1: Foreign National of Special Ability
- E-8: Seasonal Worker
- E-9-1: Manufacturing
- E-9-2: Construction
- E-9-3: Agriculture
- E-9-4: Fishery
- E-9-5: Service

== F visas ==
| Category | Name | Number of visas issued | | | |
| Category | Name | 2005 | 2010 | 2013 | 2017 |
|---|---|---|---|---|---|
| F-1 | Visiting or joining family (방문동거) | 74,479 | 34,595 | 41,740 | 82,857 |
| F-2 | Resident (거주) | 88,391 | 122,063 | 24,948 | 48,924 |
| F-3 | Accompanying spouse / child (동반) | 20,741 | 26,459 | 36,544 | 40,048 |
| F-4 | Overseas Korean (재외동포) | N/A | 129,142 | 280,130 | 515,587 |
| F-5 | Permanent resident (영주) | 11,239 | 41,561 | 87,497 | 151,115 |
| F-6 | Marriage to Korean Citizen (결혼이민) | N/A | N/A | 98,965 | 130,834 |

- F-2-1: Awarded to the spouse of a Korean. (Abolished—Changed to F-6 from 15 Dec 2011.)
- F-2-2: A single-entry visa valid for 90 days or less issued to an underage foreign child of Korean national.
- F-2-3: Single-entry resident visa valid for one year or less issued to the spouse of a resident visa holder (F-5).
- F-2-4: Recognized refugee
- F-2-7: Awarded on a points-based system. It seems difficult to find details of this system on Korean government agency websites. More up-to-date information on the points system is available on various sites around the web.
- F-2-99: May be awarded upon fulfilment of additional requirements after 5 years on an E-2 visa.
- F-4-11: Overseas Korean
- F-4-12: Descendent of Overseas Korean
- F-4-13: Former D or E visa holder
- F-4-14: University Graduates
- F-4-15: Permanent resident of OECD country
- F-4-16: Corporate Executive
- F-4-17: Entrepreneur of $100,000
- F-4-18: Multinational Company
- F-4-19: Representative of overseas Koreans organization
- F-4-20: Government Employee; Overseas Korean with a foreign nationality of a country, who is currently a member of National Assembly, or has worked for 5 years or more at government office/enterprise
- F-4-21: Teacher; Overseas Korean with a foreign nationality of a country notified by the Minister of Justice of ROK, who is a university professor (including associate professor and lecturer), or a teacher at an elementary/middle/high school
- F-5-11: Special Talent; recognized by the Minister of Justice for his/her excellence in a specific field including science, management, education, cultural arts, and athletics
- F-6-1: Spouse of a Korean National
- F-6-2: Child Raising; Father or mother of minor child born after a marriage with Korean (including de facto marriage), but not qualified for F-6-1 (spouse of Korean citizen), who is raising or is planning to raise the child in ROK

== G visas ==
| Category | Name | Number of visas issued | | | |
| Category | Name | 2005 | 2010 | 2013 | 2017 |
|---|---|---|---|---|---|
| G-1 | Miscellaneous (기타) | 1,247 | 1,390 | 1,014 | 6,047 |

Some of the G-1 visa sub-types:

- G-1-1: Medical treatment due to industrial accidents and the family member.
- G-1-2: Undergoing medical treatments as a result of diseases or accidents (or are a guardian of such a person).
- G-1-3: Involved in a lawsuit.
- G-1-4: Involved in a labor arbitration case (authorized through the Ministry of Employment and Labor)
- G-1-5: Refugee applicants (Asylum seekers).
- G-1-6: Humanitarian Status.
- G-1-10: Treatment and recuperation.
- G-1-11: Fallen victim to prostitution, sexual assault/harassment, human trafficking, etc.

== H visas ==
| Category | Name | Number of visas issued | | | |
| Category | Name | 2005 | 2010 | 2013 | 2017 |
|---|---|---|---|---|---|
| H-1 | Working holiday (관광취업) | 1,113 | 1,400 | 4,121 | 6,422 |
| H-2 | Working visit (방문취업제) | N/A | 310,230 | 230,739 | 251,674 |

- H-2-1: Work and Visit (Family Connection)
- H-2-2: Work and Visit (Parents/Spouse of D-2 Student)
- H-2-5: Work and Visit (By lottery)
- H-2-7: Work and Visit (Expired Visa); Overseas Korean aged 25 or older with foreign nationality in accordance with the Act on Immigration and Legal Status of Overseas Koreans who is 60 years or younger at the time of complete departure from ROK after the expiration of the (H-2)

== M visas ==
| Category | Name | Number of visas issued | |
| Category | Name | 2005 | 2017 |
|---|---|---|---|
| M-1 | Military (군인) | 73,014 | N/A |

== T visas ==
| Category | Name | Number of visas issued | |
| Category | Name | 2013 | 2017 |
|---|---|---|---|
| T-1 | Tourist landing (관광상륙) | 428,481 | 291,106 |

== See also ==
- Visa (document)
- Immigration in South Korea
- South Korean law
- Visa policy of South Korea
