= Fokker M 10 =

M 10
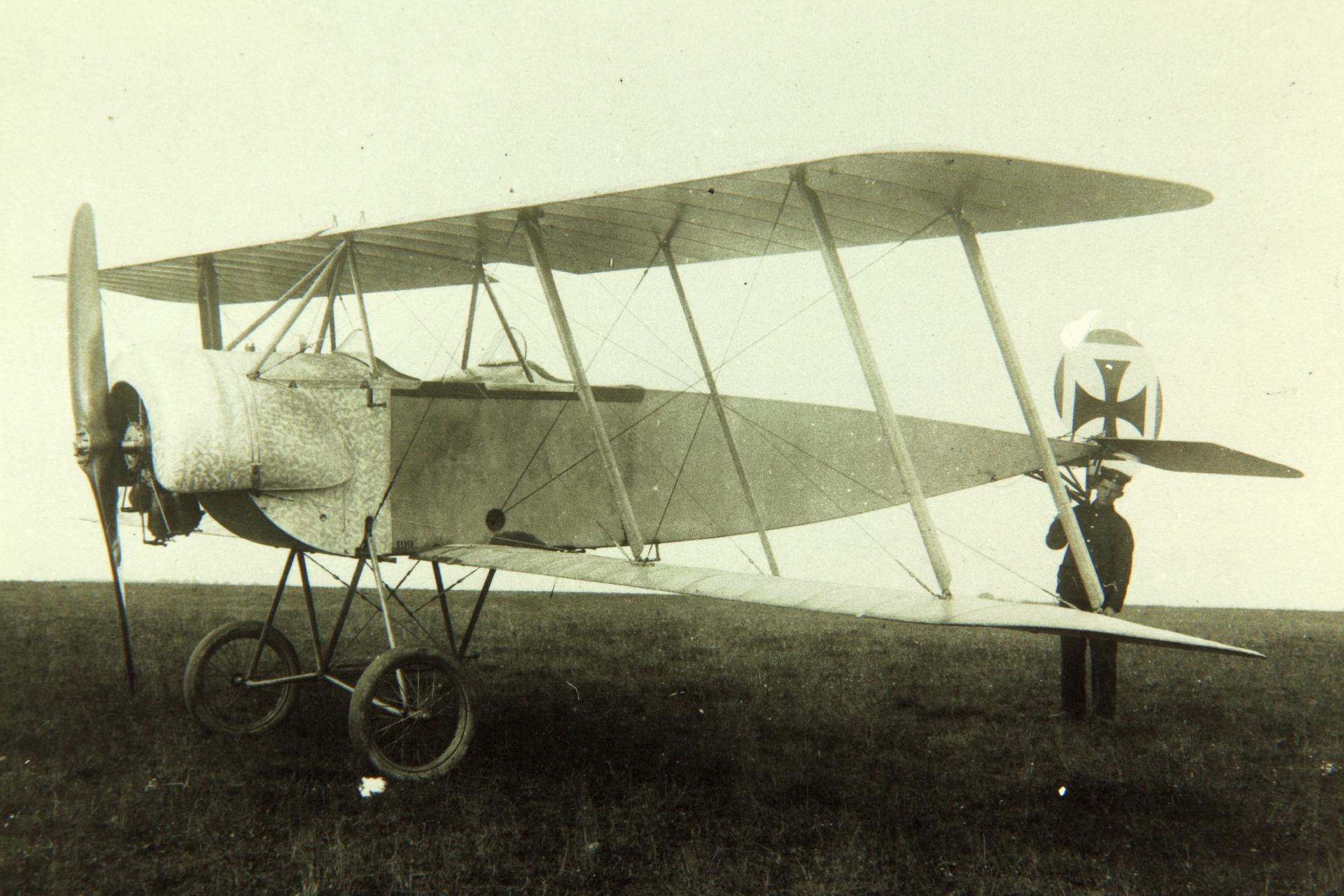
- M.10Z

General information
- Type: Reconnaissance aircraft
- Manufacturer: Fokker
- Designer: Martin Kreutzer
- Primary user: Imperial and Royal Aviation Troops (Kaiserliche und Königliche Luftfahrtruppen or K.u.K. Luftfahrtruppen)
- Number built: Small numbers of M 10E (B.I) and 23 M10Z (B.II)

History
- Developed from: Fokker M.7

The Fokker M 10 was a two-seater reconnaissance / trainer biplane with single-bay wings equipped with wing-warping controls for roll, powered by a 7-cylinder 80 hp Oberursel U.0 engine. Several M 10 aircraft were purchased by the Imperial and Royal Aviation Troops of Austro Hungary.

During the First World War the Imperial and Royal Aviation Troops (colloquially known as the Austro-Hungarian Air Service or K.u.K. Luftfahrtruppen) lacked aircraft production capacity, purchasing aircraft from its German ally. In 1916 the Fokker M 10 was acquired in two versions, with single-bay wings as the Fokker M 10E (E for Einstielig), known to the Luftfahrtruppen as the Fokker B.I), and the Fokker M 10Z (Z for Zweistielig), with two-bay wings (known by the Luftfahrtruppen as the Fokker B.II).

The single-bay winged M 10E (B.I) was powered by an 60 kW (80 hp) Oberursel U.0 7-cyl. rotary engine and was derived directly from the earlier Fokker M 7, which had been operated by the Naval air service of the Kaiserliche Marine from 1915. The aircraft were almost identical with the exception of revised and strengthened undercarriage and centre section cabane struts.

The first 12 machines, 03.13-03.24, were delivered in January-February 1915. The last 12, 03.29-03.40 were all delivered without engines by January 1916. Aircraft served in Flik 6 on the Balkan Front; Fliks 14, 25, 27 on the Isonzo Front and Fliks 16 and 17 in Karnten and the Tyrol until early 1916. As they became replaced by better, more powerful machines they were relegated to secondary training activities, serving with Fleks 3, 4, 6, 8 and 9 until the end of the war.

== Operators ==
Austria-Hungary

- KuKLFT

Germany

- Luftstreitkrafte
- Kaiserliche Marine

== Specifications (M.10Z) ==
General characteristics

- Crew: 2
- Length: 6.20 m (20 ft 4 in)
- Wingspan: 7.20 m (23 ft 7 in)
- Height: 2.71 m (8 ft 11 in)
- Empty weight: 274 kg (604 lb)
- Gross weight: 481 kg (1,060 lb)
- Powerplant: 1 × Oberursel U.0 7-cyl. air-cooled rotary piston engine, 60 kW (80 hp)

Performance

- Maximum speed: 130 km/h (81 mph, 70 kn)

== Bibliography ==
- Gray, Peter; Owen Thetford (1970). German Aircraft of the First World War (2nd ed.). London: Putnam & Company Ltd. p. 339. ISBN 0-370-00103-6.
- Grosz, Peter Michael; Haddow, George & Schiemer, Peter (1993). Austro-Hungarian Army Aircraft of World War One. Mountain View, California: Flying Machines Press. ISBN 0-9637110-0-8.
- Herris, Jack (2020). Fokker Aircraft of WWI: Volume 1: Spinne–M.10 & Watercraft: A Centennial Perspective on Great War Airplanes. Great War Aviation Centennial Series. Vol. 51. n.p.: Aeronaut Books. ISBN 978-1-953201-05-8.
- Leaman, Paul (2001). Fokker Aircraft of World War One. Marlborough, UK: Crowood Press. ISBN 1-86126-353-8.
