= Fokker B.II (1923) =

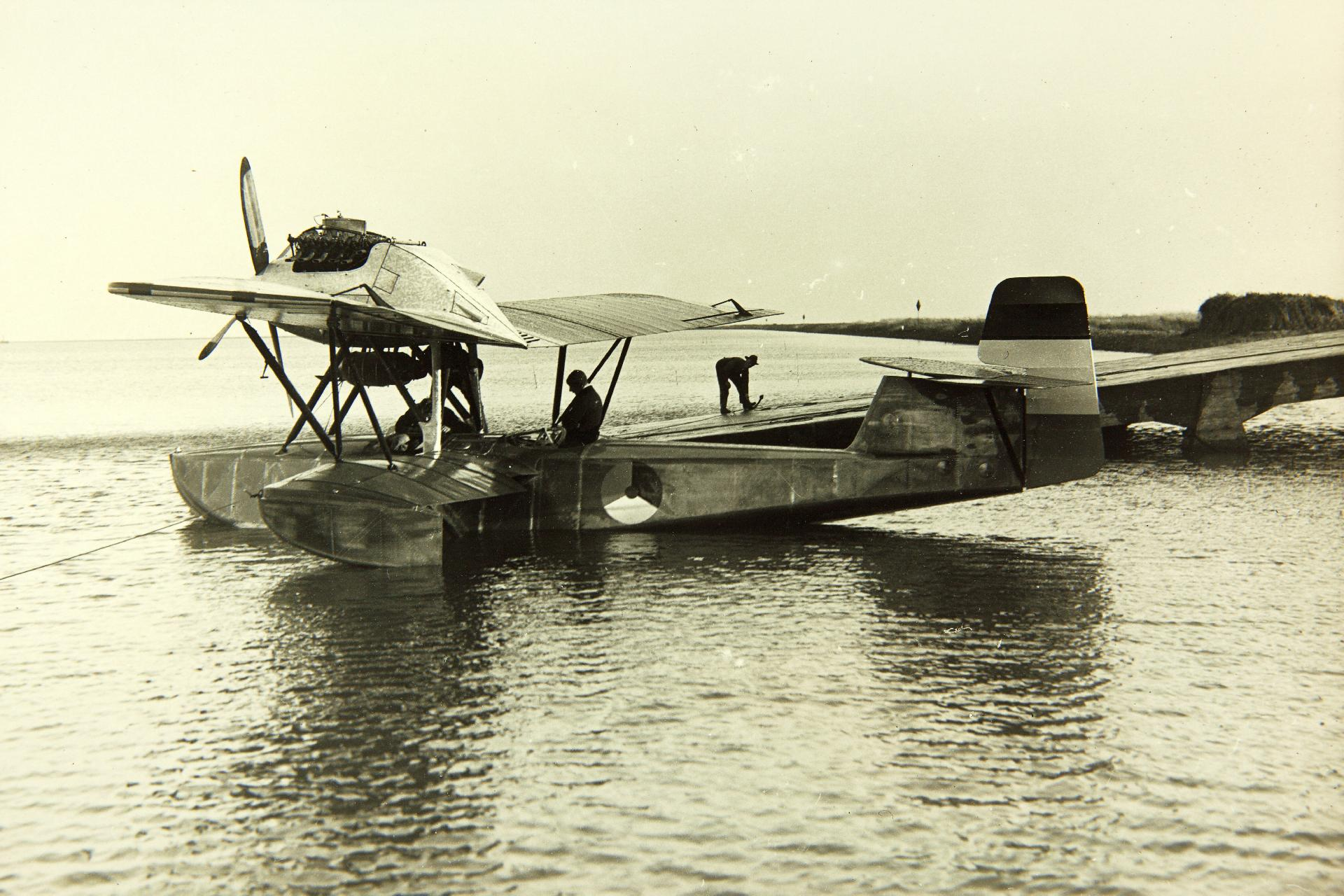

General information
- Type: Reconnaissance flying boat
- Manufacturer: Fokker
- Number built: 1

History
- First flight: 15 December 1923

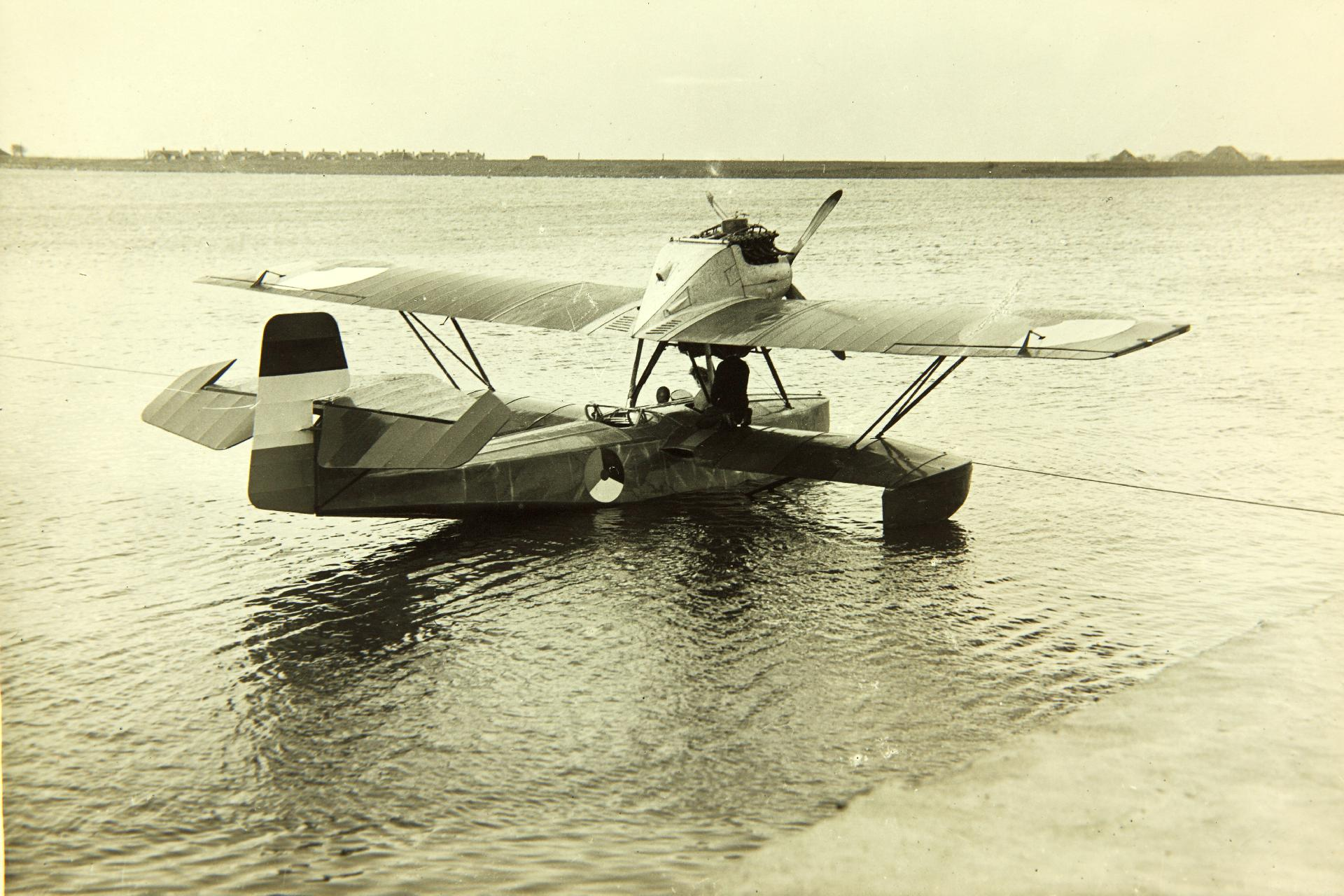
Fokker B.II flying boat

The Fokker B.II was a prototype sesquiplane shipboard reconnaissance flying boat built in the Netherlands in 1923.

== Development ==
It was a conventional flying boat with a duralumin hull and sesquiplane wings braced with N-struts. The tractor configuration engine was mounted on the leading edge of the upper wing driving a four-bladed propeller. Open cockpits were provided for the crew under the upper wing and in a dorsal position amidships.

The Royal Dutch Navy tested the prototype, but no production orders followed.

== Specifications ==
Data from Les Ailes, December 1923

General characteristics

- Crew: Three
- Length: 9.85 m (32 ft 4 in)
- Upper wingspan: 14.60 m (47 ft 11 in)
- Height: 3.80 m (12 ft 6 in)
- Wing area: 40 m^{2} (430 sq ft)
- Empty weight: 1,300 kg (2,866 lb)
- Gross weight: 2,100 kg (4,630 lb)
- Fuel capacity: 470 L (100 imp gal; 120 US gal)
- Powerplant: 1 × Rolls-Royce Eagle XII water-cooled V-12, 270 kW (360 hp)
- Propellers: 4-bladed

Performance

- Maximum speed: 195 km/h (121 mph, 105 kn)
- Endurance: 4 hr
- Service ceiling: 4,000 m (13,000 ft)
- Time to altitude: 60 min to 1,000 m (3,300 ft)
