= Albatros C.XIII =

C.XIII
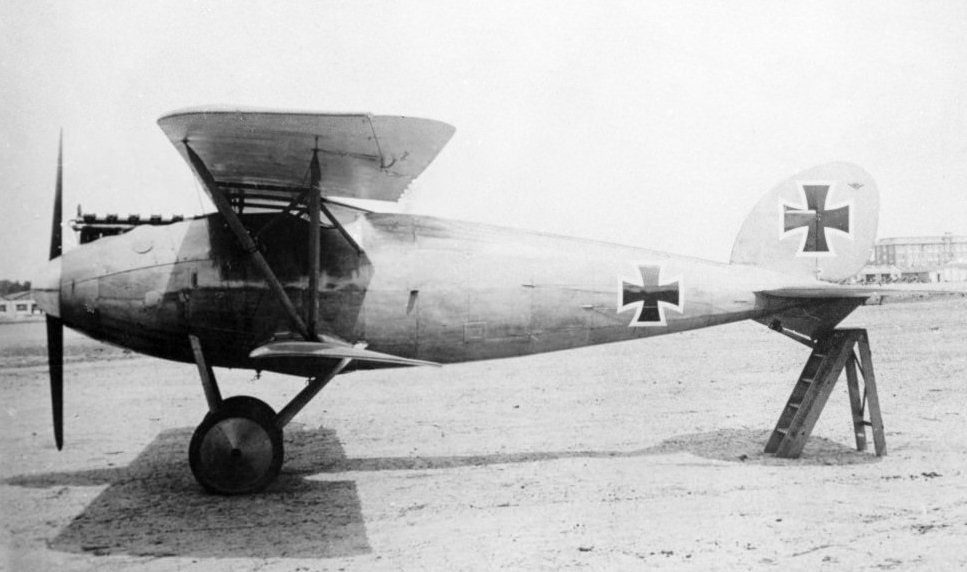

General information
- Type: 2 seat fighter aircraft
- National origin: Germany
- Manufacturer: Albatros Flugzeugwerke
- Number built: 1

History
- First flight: 1917

The Albatros C.XIII was a German two-seat, single-engine, biplane light fighter aircraft built in 1917. Only one was constructed.

== Design and development ==
The C.XIII was built along the lines of the single seat Albatros D.Va but was a two-seater, larger by about 10% in span and by 6% in length. It was intended to fall into the newer Idflieg two seat CL-class, reserved for lighter two-seat fighters.

The round cross section, plywood-covered fuselage was, apart from the second, tandem open cockpit similar in appearance to that of the D.Va, smoothly tapering to the nose with lines that merged into those of the spinner. As with the single-seater, the inline Mercedes D.III engine was largely enclosed but had its six upper cylinders exposed. The C.XIII was fitted with an early 160 hp (119 kW) unit, less powerful than the D.Va's. The empennage was noticeably different, with a narrower, taller vertical tail. Its straight, constant-chord wings had single bays and were mounted without stagger. The undercarriage was of the fixed type, with mainwheels on V-struts and a faired-in tailskid.

First flown in 1917, only one C.XIII was built and the type did not enter production; instead Albatros built the flat-sided, two-bay, more powerful C.XIV the following year for the light two-seat category, developing it into the production C.XV.

== Specifications ==
Data from German Aircraft of World War I.

General characteristics

- Crew: Two
- Length: 7.8 m (25 ft 7 in)
- Wingspan: 10.0 m (32 ft 10 in)
- Height: 2.71 m (8 ft 11 in)
- Empty weight: 700 kg (1,543 lb)
- Gross weight: 1,060 kg (2,337 lb)
- Powerplant: 1 × Mercedes D.III 6-cylinder water-cooled inline, 120 kW (160 hp)
- Propellers: 2-bladed

Performance

- Maximum speed: 165 km/h (103 mph, 89 kn)
- Endurance: 2.5 hr
- Time to altitude: 47 min to 5,000 m (16,400 ft)

Armament

- Guns: 1 × Spandau machine gun and 1 × Parabellum MG14 machine gun

== See also ==
Related development

- Albatros D.V
