= Albatros D.IV =

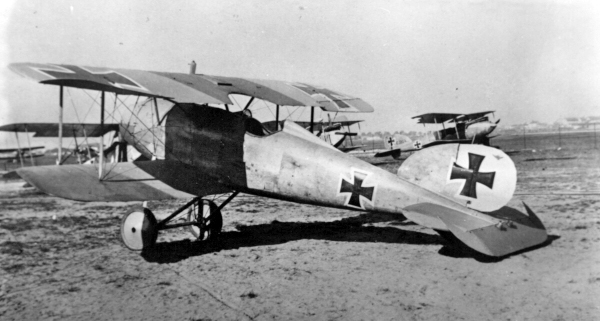

General information
- Type: Fighter
- Manufacturer: Albatros Flugzeugwerke
- Primary user: Luftstreitkräfte
- Number built: 3

The Albatros D.IV was an experimental German fighter aircraft built and tested during World War I.

== Design and development ==
The D.IV was designed to test a geared version of the 120 kW (160 hp) Mercedes D.III engine. Unlike the ungeared version, the geared engine was completely enclosed within the fuselage. The airframe basically combined the D.II wing cellule with the D.Va fuselage.

Three examples were ordered in November 1916, but only one was flown. It was tested with several types of propeller, but excessive vibration problems and limited performance increase precluded further development.

== Specifications ==
Data from German Aircraft of the First World War and The Complete Book of Fighters.

General characteristics

- Crew: 1
- Length: 7.33 m (24 ft 1 in)
- Wingspan: 9.05 m (29 ft 8 in)
- Height: 2.59 m (8 ft 6 in)
- Wing area: 20.50 m^{2} (220.7 sq ft)
- Powerplant: 1 × Mercedes D.III geared water-cooled in-line piston engine, 120 kW (160 hp)
- Propellers: 2-bladed wooden propeller

Performance

- Maximum speed: 165 km/h (103 mph, 89 kn)
- Range: 350 km (220 mi, 190 nmi)
- Endurance: 2 hours 12 minutes
- Rate of climb: 2.6 m/s (510 ft/min)
- Time to altitude: 5,000 m (16,404 ft) in 32 minutes

== See also ==
Aircraft of comparable role, configuration, and era

- Nieuport 17

Related lists

- List of aircraft (0-A)
- List of military aircraft of Germany
