= Albatros Dr.I =

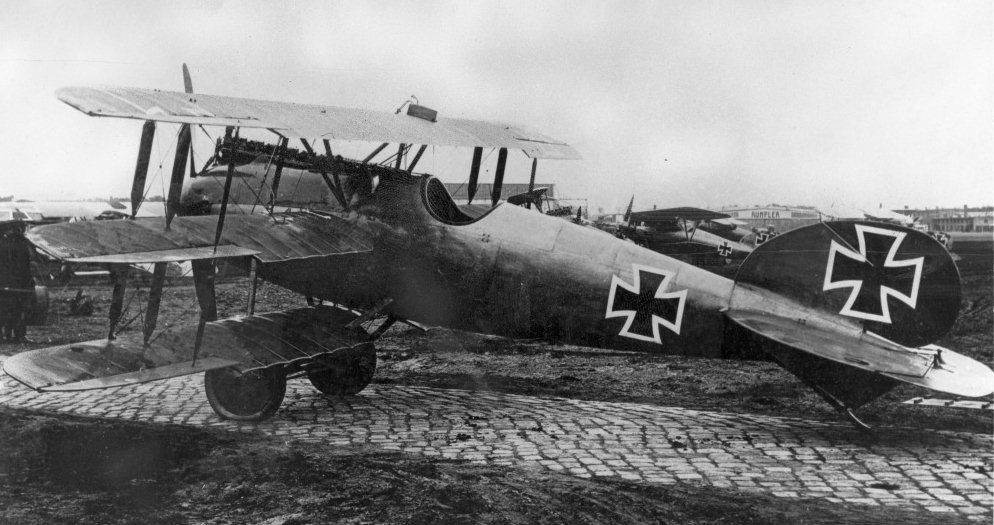

General information
- Type: Fighter
- Manufacturer: Albatros Flugzeugwerke
- Primary user: Luftstreitkräfte
- Number built: 1

History
- Developed from: Albatros D.V

The Albatros Dr. I was a German fighter triplane derivative of the D.V fitted with three pairs of wings instead of two. Identical in most other respects to the D.V, in the summer of 1917 it was flown side by side with the existing biplane in comparison trials. There was no discernible performance advantage and development was halted at the prototype stage.

== Specifications ==
Data from Gray and Thetford 1962, p.266

General characteristics

- Crew: 1
- Length: 7.3 m (23 ft 11 in)
- Wingspan: 8.7 m (28 ft 7 in)
- Height: 2.42 m (7 ft 11 in)
- Powerplant: 1 × Mercedes D.III 6-cylinderinline water-cooled, 120 kW (160 hp)
- Propellers: 2-bladed

Armament
2 x lMG 08 machine guns
