= Albatros Flugzeugwerke =

German aircraft manufacturer (1909–1931)

- Industry: Aircraft manufacturer
- Founded: 1909; 117 years ago in Johannisthal, Prussia, Germany
- Defunct: 1931
- Fate: Merged
- Successor: Focke-Wulf
- Headquarters: Johannisthal, Germany
- Key people: Dr. phil. Enno Walther Huth; Ernst Heinkel; Rudolf Schubert; Prof. Dipl.-Ing. Walter Blume; Lothar Wieland
- Products: Aircraft

Albatros Flugzeugwerke GmbH was a German aircraft manufacturer best known for supplying the German Luftstreitkräfte during World War I.

The company was based in Johannisthal, Berlin, where it was founded by Walter Huth and Otto Wiener on 20 December 1909. The company (and its subsidiary, Ostdeutsche Albatros Werke (OAW)) produced many capable fighter aircraft, notably the Albatros D.III and Albatros D.V, both designed by Robert Thelen. Albatros merged into Focke-Wulf in 1931.

== History ==
The company was founded in Berlin-Johannisthal in late 1909 by Enno Walther Huth as the Albatros Werke AG. The first aircraft the company produced was a French Antoinette monoplane, which they built under licence.

They then produced several versions of the Etrich Taube monoplane, as well the Doppeltaube biplane which used the same basic planform. A variety of other biplanes, with more conventional wing planforms were also built and flown.

In 1912, five Albatros F-2 were built. This was a development of the French Farman III biplane (hence the letter F) with a gondola for the crew and an Argus in-line engine instead of the original Gnome Omega rotary engine. Four were sold to Bulgaria where they took an active part in the 1912–1913 Balkan Wars.

On 16 October 1912, one of these carried out the first combat mission over Europe.

During World War I, Albatros Flugzeugwerke produced about 10,300 aircraft, including fighters, bombers and reconnaissance aircraft. After the war, production of various civilian types was carried out.

== Aircraft ==
| Company Designations | Idflieg/RLM Designations | First flight | Number built | Type | Image |
|---|---|---|---|---|---|
| Taube | n/a | | | Reconnaissance | |
| Doppeltaube | n/a | 1910 | | Reconnaissance | |
| L.1 | B.I | 1913 | | Reconnaissance | |
| L.2 | B.II | 1914 | | Reconnaissance | |
| L.3/GDD | n/a | 1914 | 6 | Single-seat reconnaissance | |
| L.4 | G.I | 1916 | 1 | Bomber | |
| L.5/LDD | B.III | 1917 | | Reconnaissance | |
| L.6 | C.I | 1915 | 629 ca. | Reconnaissance | |
| L.7 | C.I | 1915 | qv L.6 | Reconnaissance | |
| L.8 | C.II | 1916 | | Reconnaissance | |
| L.9/ME | n/a | | | Single-seat reconnaissance | |
| L.10 | C.III | 1915 | 2271 ca. | Reconnaissance | |
| L.11 | G.II | 1916 | 1 | Bomber | |
| L.12 | C.IV | 1916 | 1 | Reconnaissance | |
| L.13 | C.I | 1915 | | Reconnaissance | |
| L.14 | C.V | 1916 | 400 ca. | Reconnaissance | |
| L.15 | D.I | 1916 | 50 | Fighter | |
| L.16 | C.III | 1915 | qv L.10 | Reconnaissance | |
| L.17 | D.II | 1916 | 291 | Fighter | |
| L.18 | C.VII | 1916 | 600+ | Reconnaissance | |
| L.19 | C.VIII N | 1917 | 1 | Night bomber | |
| L.20 | D.III | 1916 | 1,866 | Fighter | |
| L.21 | G.III | 1916 | 9+ | Bomber | |
| L.22 | D.IV | 1917 | 3 | Fighter | |
| L.23 | C.IX | 1917 | | Reconnaissance | |
| L.24 | D.V & D.Va | 1917 | 2500 ca. | Fighter | |
| L.25 | C.X | 1917 | 300+ | Reconnaissance | |
| L.26 | C.XI | n/a | 0 | Reconnaissance project | |
| L.27 | C.XII | 1917 | | Reconnaissance | |
| L.28 | D.VI | 1917 | 1 | Fighter | |
| L.29 | C.XIII | 1917 | 1 | Two-seat fighter | |
| L.30 | B.II | 1914 | | Trainer | |
| L.31 | C.XIV | 1918 | 1 | Reconnaissance | |
| L.32 | C.Ia | 1915 | | Trainer | |
| L.33 | C.Ib | 1915 | | Trainer | |
| L.34 | D.VII | 1917 | 1 | Fighter | |
| L.35 | D.VIII | n/a | 0 | Fighter | |
| L.36 | Dr.I | 1917 | 1 | Triplane fighter | |
| L.37 | D.IX | 1917 | 1 | Fighter | |
| L.38 | D.X | 1918 | 1 | Fighter | |
| L.39 | Dr.II | 1918 | 1 | Triplane fighter | |
| L.40 | J.I | 1917 | 240 ca. | Ground attack | |
| L.41 | D.XI | 1918 | 2 | Fighter | |
| L.42 | J.II | 1918 | 4+ | Ground attack | |
| L.43 | D.XII | 1918 | 2 | Fighter | |
| L.44 | D.XIII | n/a | 0 | Fighter project | |
| L.45 | D.XIIIa | n/a | 0 | Fighter project | |
| L.46 | D.XIV | 1918 | 1 | Two-seat fighter | |
| L.47 | C.XV | 1918 | 50 ca. | Two-seat fighter | |
| L.48 | J.III | n/a | 0 | ground attack project | |
| L.49/DA 1 | n/a | n/a | 0 | unknown project | |
| L.50 | G.IV | n/a | 0 | Bomber project | |
| L.51 | C.If | | | Trainer | |
| L.52 | C.I | | | Trainer | |
| L.53 | CLS.I | | | Ground attack | |
| L.54 | F.I | n/a | 0 | Reconnaissance project | |
| L.55 | D.XV | n/a | 0 | Fighter | |
| L.56 | n/a | n/a | 0 | Airliner project | |
| L.57 | n/a | n/a | 0 | Airliner project | |
| L.58 | n/a | 1923 | 7 | Airliner | |
| L.59 | n/a | 1923 | 1 | Sportsplane | |
| L.60 | n/a | 1923 | 3 | Sportsplane | |
| L.65 | n/a | 1925 | 2 | Reconnaissance | |
| L.66 | n/a | 1924 | 10 | Sportsplane | |
| L.67 | n/a | 1924 | 2 | Sportsplane | |
| L.68 | n/a | 1926 | 18 | Trainer | |
| L.69 | n/a | 1925 | 4 | Trainer | |
| L.70 | n/a | 1925 | | Reconnaissance | |
| L.71 | n/a | 1925 | 2 | Sportplane | |
| L.72 & L 72A | n/a | 1925 | 5 | Newspaper distribution aircraft | |
| L.73 | n/a | 1926 | 4 | Airliner | |
| L.74 | n/a | 1928 | 2 | Trainer | |
| L.75 Ass | n/a | 1928 | 43 | Trainer | |
| L.76 Aeolus | n/a | 1927 | 6 | Trainer | |
| L.77v | n/a | 1928 | 4 | Fighter/reconnaissance | |
| L.78 | n/a | 1928 | 13 | Reconnaissance | |
| L.79 Kobold | n/a | 1929 | 2 | Aerobatics | |
| L.80 | n/a | n/a | 0 | Night bomber project | |
| L.81 Elektra | n/a | 1932 | 1 | Experimental aircraft | |
| L.82 | n/a | 1929 | 72 | Trainer | |
| L.83 Adler | n/a | 1931 | 2 | Airliner/transport | |
| L.84 | n/a | 1935 | 5 | Fighter | |
L.85-99 skipped
| L.100 | n/a | 1930 | 1 | Air racing | |
| L.101 | Al 101 | 1930 | 71 | Trainer | |
| L.102 | Al 102 | 1932 | 10 | Trainer | |
| L.103 | Al 103 | 1933 | 1 | Experimental | |
| H.1 | n/a | n/a | 1 | altitude record (not flown) | |
| W.1/WDD | B.II-W | 1913 | | Patrol floatplane | |
| W.2 | n/a | 1916 | 1 | Patrol floatplane | |
| W.3 | Marine 527 | 1916 | 1 | Floatplane torpedo bomber | |
| W.4 | n/a | 1916 | 118 | Floatplane fighter | |
| W.5 | Marine 845-849 | 1917 | 5 | Floatplane torpedo bomber | |
| W.6 | n/a | | 1 | Floatplane fighter | |
| W.7 | n/a | | 1 | Floatplane fighter | |
| W.8 | Marine 5001-5003 | 1918 | 3 | Two-seat floatplane fighter | |
| W.10 | n/a | n/a | 0 | Flying boat project of 1922 | |
