= Albatros D.XII =

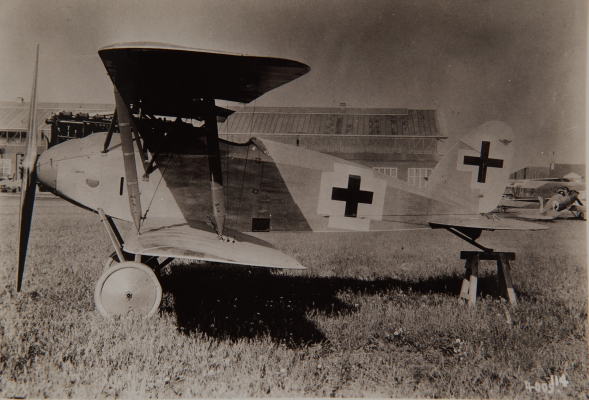

General information
- Type: Fighter
- Manufacturer: Albatros Flugzeugwerke
- Status: retired
- Primary user: Germany
- Number built: 2

History
- First flight: March 1918

The Albatros D.XII was a German single-seat fighter biplane first flown in March 1918. It was the last of the Albatros fighters completed and flown before the end of World War I and had the same slab-sided fuselage seen on the Albatros D.X.

== Design and development ==
The first example of the D.XII used a 134 kW (180 hp) Mercedes D.IIIa engine and had balanced, parallel-chord ailerons. The second, built in April 1918, featured unbalanced, inversely tapered ailerons and Bohme undercarriage with pneumatic shock absorbers. Although it was initially fitted with the Mercedes engine, it was later re-engined with a BMW IIIa producing 138 kW (185 hp). In this form, the D.XII competed in the third Adlershof D-Type Contest in October 1918. No further aircraft were built.

== Specifications (D.XII) ==
Data from German Aircraft of the First World War.

General characteristics

- Crew: 1
- Length: 5.785 m (19 ft 0 in)
- Wingspan: 8.2 m (26 ft 11 in)
- Height: 2.8 m (9 ft 2 in)
- Wing area: 19.84 m^{2} (213.6 sq ft)
- Empty weight: 580 kg (1,279 lb)
- Gross weight: 760 kg (1,676 lb)
- Powerplant: 1 × Mercedes D.III 6-cyl. water-cooled in-line piston engine, 120 kW (160 hp) (first prototype)
  - second prototype - 1x BMW IIIa 6-cyl.water-cooled in-line piston engine developing 138 kW (185hp)

Performance

- Maximum speed: 180 km/h (110 mph, 97 kn)
- Endurance: 1 hour
- Rate of climb: 2.47 m/s (486 ft/min)
- Time to altitude: 8,000 m (26,247 ft) in 54 minutes

Armament

- Guns: 2 × 7.92 mm (0.312 in) LMG 08/15 machine guns
