= Albatros C.VIII N =

German bomber biplane

C.VIII N

General information
- Type: Night bomber aircraft
- National origin: Germany
- Manufacturer: Albatros Flugzeugwerke
- Number built: 1

History
- First flight: 1917

The Albatros C.VIII N was a German large, single engine biplane bomber, intended for night time operations, It was seriously underpowered and could only carry a small bomb load.

== Design and development ==
The C.III N was a large but underpowered three bay night bomber, as denoted by the N, its engine only just powerful enough to meet the Idflieg two seat C-class minimum requirement. It had straight edged, constant chord wings of about equal span and with parallel pairs of interplane struts. There were ailerons on both upper and lower planes.

A 119 kW (160 hp) inline Mercedes D.III mounted in the nose with its upper cylinders exposed drove a two blade propeller, with two tandem, open cockpits aft. The externally braced tailplane was at mid-fuselage height; the fin, broad and almost quadrant-edged, carried a balanced rudder which ended above the elevators. The C.VIII N landed on a fixed conventional undercarriage with a pair of mainwheels on a rigid axle and a tailskid.

The C.VIII N first flew in 1917 and it seems likely only one was built.

== Specifications ==
Data from German aircraft of the first World War p.257

General characteristics

- Crew: 2
- Length: 7.34 m (24 ft 1 in)
- Wingspan: 16.34 m (53 ft 7 in)
- Powerplant: 1 × Mercedes D.III 6-cylinder water cooled inline, 120 kW (160 hp)
- Propellers: 2-bladed

Performance

- Maximum speed: 135 km/h (84 mph, 73 kn)
- Time to altitude: 5 min to 1,000 m (3,280 ft)

Armament

- Guns: 1×Spandau machine gun and 1×Parabellum machine gun
- Bombs: light load under wing
