= Albatros C.IX =

1917 German military reconnaissance biplane

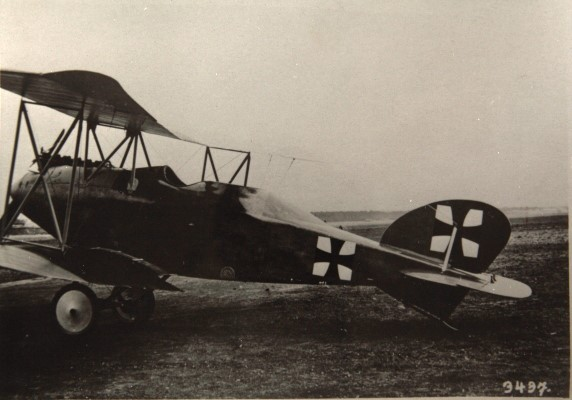

General information
- Type: Reconnaissance aircraft
- National origin: Germany
- Manufacturer: Albatros
- Number built: 3

History
- First flight: 1917

The Albatros C.IX was a two-seated German military reconnaissance biplane from 1917. It was built by Albatros Flugzeugwerke. It did not have a central strut between the upper wing and the fuselage, which was uncommon during the time. Also unusual was that the top wing was swept, while the lower wing was straight. Only three of these aircraft were built.

Manfred von Richthofen used one for personal transport, including going to meet Kaiser Wilhelm II in May 1917.

== Specifications ==
General characteristics

- Crew: 2
- Length: 8.22 m (27 ft 0 in)
- Wingspan: 10.4 m (34 ft 1 in)
- Height: 2.74 m (9 ft 0 in)
- Empty weight: 790 kg (1,742 lb)
- Powerplant: 1 × Mercedes D.III Inline piston engine, 118 kW (158 hp)

Performance

- Maximum speed: 155 km/h (96 mph, 84 kn)
- Range: 385 km (239 mi, 208 nmi)

Armament

- Guns: 2 × 7.9mm machine guns
