= Schütte-Lanz G.I =

G.I
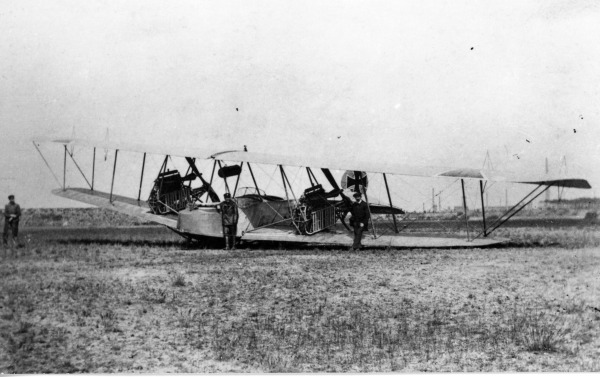
- The Schutte-Lanz G.I after coming to grief on landing.

General information
- Type: Experimental aircraft
- National origin: Germany
- Manufacturer: Schütte-Lanz, Luftschiffbau
- Number built: 1

History
- First flight: c.1915

The Schütte-Lanz G.I was a large, twin engine, pusher configuration, experimental biplane built in Germany early in World War I. Only one was completed.

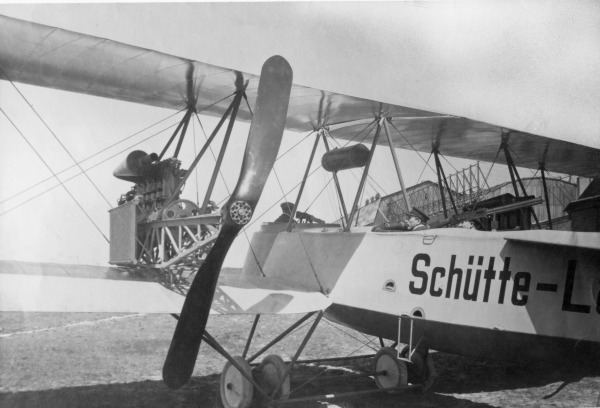

== Design and development ==
Schütte-Lanz were best known for their airships, but they also designed and built aeroplanes though none went into production. The Idflieg G designation letter applied to twin engine aircraft, though this machine, Schütte-Lanz's first twin, originally fell into the early K class reserved for heavy military aeroplanes. The German engineer Wilhelm Hillmann designed the G.I around 1914 in Mannheim-Rheinau. It crashed on the landing field of the Luftschiffbau Schütte-Lanz by sticking into a rabbit hole during the landing.

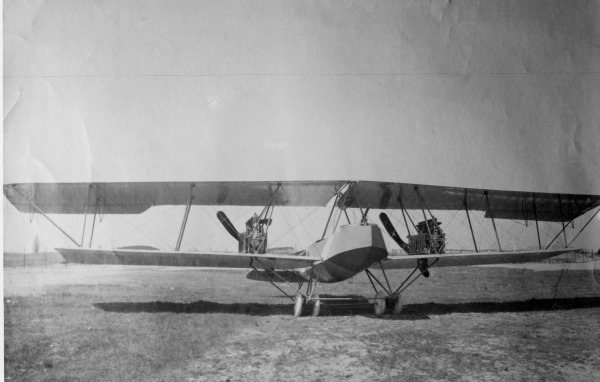

The G.I was a two bay triplane, the bays separated by parallel pairs of interplane struts. The wings were unswept and had constant chord and blunt tips. The upper span was significantly greater than that of the lower wing, so its tips were supported by extra, outward leaning parallel pairs of struts; there was little stagger. Only the upper wing carried ailerons, which had trailing edges projecting behind that of the wing. The ailerons were operated by wires from the ends of long levers, each projecting above and below the wing. The 119 kW (160 hp) Mercedes D.III six cylinder inline engines were mounted on the lower wing's upper surface in the inner bay and largely uncowled. These drove pusher configuration propellers beyond the trailing edge via long shafts.

The fuselage of the G.I had a five sided cross-section, with a flat top, converging sides and a shallow V-shaped underside. There was an open gunner's position in the blunt extreme nose, which was rounded in plan. The upper wing, well above the open pilot's cockpit, had a narrow central slot in it to improve his upwards vision. The tailplane was extremely broad chord, reaching forward almost to mid-fuselage, but there was no fixed fin, only a small, comma shaped, balanced rudder. It had a conventional, fixed undercarriage with double mainwheels on a single axle, mounted on multiple V-struts and with a braced tailskid.

== Specifications ==
Data from German Aircraft of the First World War p.550

General characteristics

- Crew: 2
- Length: 12 m (39 ft 4 in)
- Wingspan: 22 m (72 ft 2 in)
- Height: 4.2 m (13 ft 9 in)
- Wing area: 100 m^{2} (1,100 sq ft)
- Empty weight: 1,850 kg (4,079 lb)
- Gross weight: 3,100 kg (6,834 lb)
- Powerplant: 2 × Mercedes D.III 6 cylinder water cooled inline, 120 kW (160 hp) each
- Propellers: 2-bladed pusher

Performance

- Maximum speed: 125 km/h (78 mph, 67 kn)
- Endurance: 6 hr

Armament

- Guns: Single Parabellum MG14 machine gun in nose
