= Albatros L.71 =

L.71
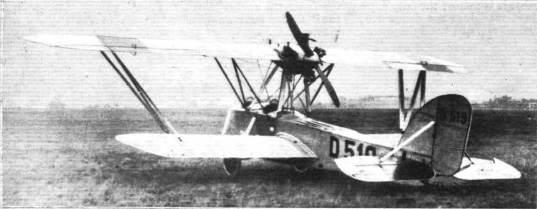

General information
- Type: Two seat light biplane
- National origin: Germany
- Manufacturer: Albatros Flugzeugwerke
- Number built: 2

History
- First flight: 1925

The Albatros L.71 was a two-seat, single pusher engined biplane built in Germany in the 1920s.

== Design and development ==
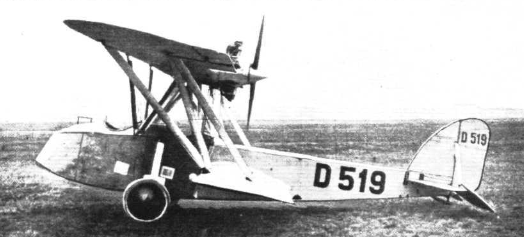

Flight described the L.71 (Note: Throughout this article Flight refers to this aircraft as the L.72, whereas most sources, including registers, call it the L71. Later in 1926 Flight had an article about a totally different Albatros L.72A, so the earlier assignment seems to have been an error.) as a flying boat on wheels because, in the 1920s, such aircraft were almost the only modern pusher biplanes. Visually, the most unusual feature was the extreme stagger, introduced to optimise the view for each of the occupants of its tandem cockpits. Both wings had spruce spars, continuous from tip to tip, and spruce ribs. The larger upper wing had no dihedral but carried the ailerons; the lower wing had 1.5° of dihedral. Outward leaning, aluminium tube N-form interplane struts braced the wings but there was none of the usual flying wire bracing in the single bay; the wings were aerodynamically quite thick, allowing them to be internally braced cantilevers. The upper wing centre section was supported by a shorter pair of outward leaning N struts from the upper fuselage. Though the lower plane was set at mid-fuselage the interplane gap was large, to provide clearance for the two blade propeller.

The pusher configuration 55 hp (41 kW) Siemens-Halske Sh 10 five cylinder radial was aerodynamically faired into the upper wing trailing edge but was not structurally connected to it; instead, four tubes from the fuselage formed the engine mounting. The fuel tank was within the forward section of the upper wing, feeding the engine by gravity with some pressure assistance. The fuselage was of mixed construction. From the nose to the lower wing leading edge, a region which included the two cockpits, it was a flat sided wooden structure, covered in plywood; aft, it was built from wire braced, welded steel tubes and fabric covering. This section included the lower wing mounting. The tail surfaces were fabric covered, over mixed steel and duraluminum frames. The incidence of the tailplane could be adjusted for pitch trimming. The L.71 had a simple, fixed conventional undercarriage with short axles hinged to the lower fuselage longerons and forward braced with short horizontal struts. Sprung, telescopic legs with rubber shock absorbers were attached to the outer end of the axles and to the upper fuselage longerons.

The L.71 was flight testing by late January 1926. Two were built.

== Specifications ==
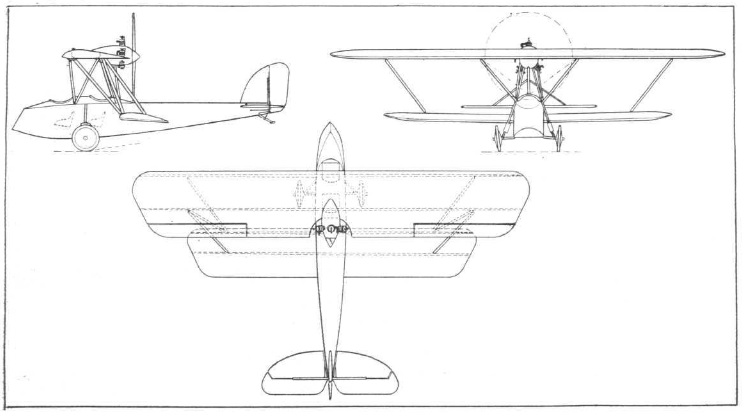

Data from Flight, 28 January 1926

General characteristics

- Capacity: Two
- Length: 7.20 m (23 ft 7 in)
- Upper wingspan: 10.30 m (33 ft 10 in)
- Lower wingspan: 7.49 m (24 ft 7 in)
- Wing area: 25 m^{2} (270 sq ft)
- Empty weight: 450 kg (992 lb)
- Gross weight: 660 kg (1,455 lb)
- Fuel capacity: 50 L (11 Imp gal, 13.2 US gal)
- Powerplant: 1 × Siemens-Halske Sh 10 5-cylinder radial, in pusher configuration, 41 kW (55 hp) (engine type number from)
- Propellers: 2-bladed

Performance

- Maximum speed: 125 km/h (78 mph, 67 kn) at sea level
- Time to altitude: 12 min to 1,000 m (3,280 ft)
- Wing loading: 26.3 kg/m^{2} (5.38 lb/sq ft)
- Power/mass: 0.038 hp/lb (62 W/kg)
