= Albatros L 84 =

1931 German fighter aircraft

L 84

General information
- Type: Fighter
- Manufacturer: Albatros Flugzeugwerke/Focke-Wulf
- Number built: 5

History
- First flight: 1931

The Albatros L 84 was a German tandem two-seat, single-bay fighter sesquiplane first flown in 1931. Four of the five examples produced were built by Focke-Wulf Flugzeugbau, into which Albatros Flugzeugwerke was amalgamated in that year.

Powered by a water-cooled 490 kW (660 hp) BMW VIu 7.3Z V12 engine, the L 84 had a fabric-covered fuselage constructed of welded steel tubes, and wooden wings skinned with plywood. Its armament comprised three 7.92 mm (.312 in) machine guns, two in fixed forward-firing positions and the third ring-mounted in the aft cockpit. Only the first prototype was completed before Albatros became part of Focke-Wulf, and this was destroyed during flight testing. A second example was flown in February 1933 by Focke-Wulf under the designation L 84C, using a modified cooling system.

The Reichswehr initially ordered twelve L 84s but cancelled the order after only three had been completed. Of these, one was designated L 84E and was tested with the Rolls-Royce Kestrel IIIS engine; another, L 84F, was fitted with a fuel-injected version of the BMW VIu. At least one L 84 was delivered to China.

== Variants ==
- L 84
- L 84C - Focke-Wulf produced version with revised cooling system
- L 84E - example with Rolls-Royce Kestrel engine
- L 84F - example with fuel-injection

== Specifications (L 84) ==
General characteristics

- Crew: two, pilot and observer
- Powerplant: 1 × BMW VI , 450 kW (600 hp)

Performance Armament

- 2 × fixed, forward-firing 7.92 mm (.312 in) machine guns
- 1 × flexible 7.92 mm (.312 in) machine gun for observer
