= Albatros C.XIV =

C.XIV
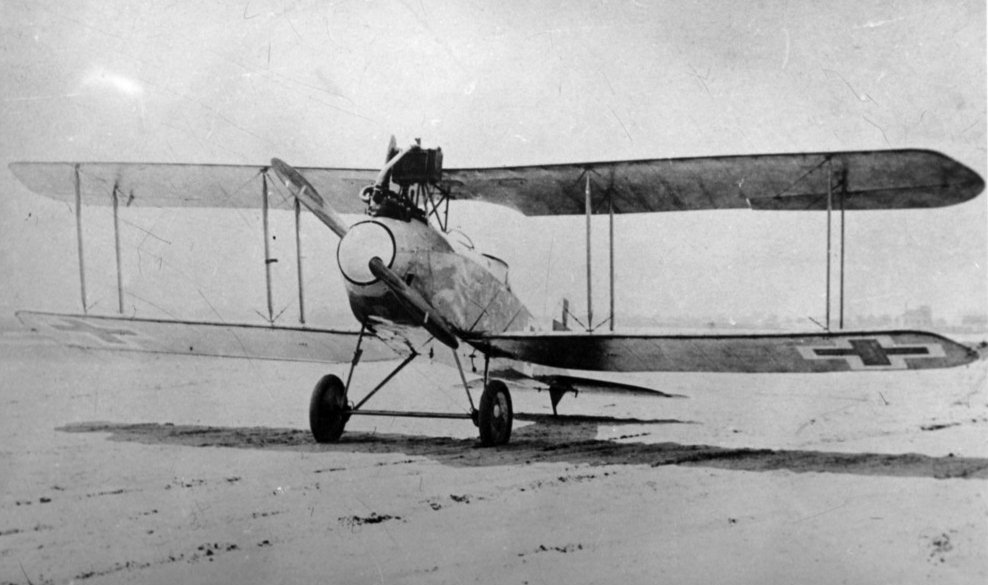

General information
- Type: 2 seat fighter aircraft
- National origin: Germany
- Manufacturer: Albatros Flugzeugwerke
- Number built: 1

History
- First flight: Spring 1918
- Developed into: Albatros C.XV

The Albatros C.XIV was a German two seat, single engine, biplane fighter aircraft built in 1918. Only one was constructed.

== Design and development ==
After experimenting in 1917 with Idflieg two seat CL-class aircraft based on their single seat D.V, Albatros returned to the two bay biplane layout and flat-sided fuselage of their earlier C types with the C.XIV.

The wings of the C.XIV were straight edged and of constant chord, with the two bays formed by parallel pairs of interplane struts. The C.XIV was the first Albatros C type to include stagger. The upper wing, held well above the fuselage on a cabane, had a semicircular cut-out to improve the pilot's vision from the forward of two tandem, open cockpits. Ailerons, which increased in chord outwards behind the inner line of the trailing edge, were fitted to this wing.

The C.XIV was powered by a 220 hp (164 kW) Benz Bz.IVa, mounted with the upper parts of its six inline cylinders partly exposed. It had a tall exhaust which reached over the wing leading edge-mounted radiator. The tailplane was mounted at the bottom of the fuselage. The undercarriage was of the fixed type, with mainwheels on V-struts and a faired-in tailskid.

It first flew in early 1918 but did not go into production. Instead, it was modified into the larger but lighter C.XV, which entered a production run ended by the Armistice with Germany.

== Specifications ==
Data from German Aircraft of World War I

General characteristics

- Crew: Two
- Length: 6.9 m (22 ft 8 in)
- Wingspan: 10.4 m (34 ft 1 in)
- Empty weight: 950 kg (2,094 lb)
- Gross weight: 1,385 kg (3,053 lb)
- Powerplant: 1 × Benz Bz.IVa 6-cylinder water-cooled inline, 160 kW (220 hp)
- Propellers: 2-bladed

Performance

- Endurance: 3.5 hr

Armament

- Guns: 1 × MG08 Spandau + 1 × Parabellum MG14 machine guns

== See also ==
Related development

- Albatros C.XV
