= Albatros L 57 =

Early monoplane

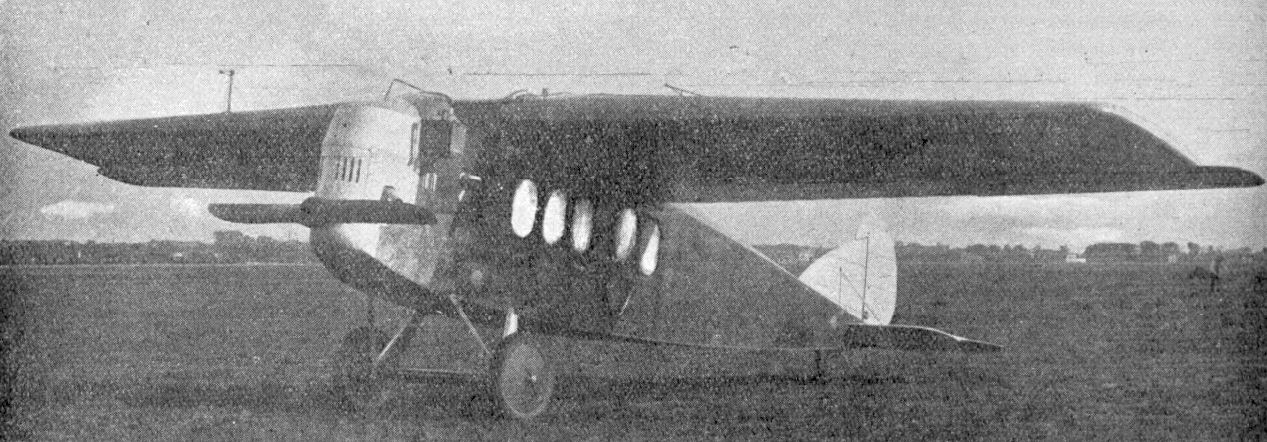
Albatros L 57

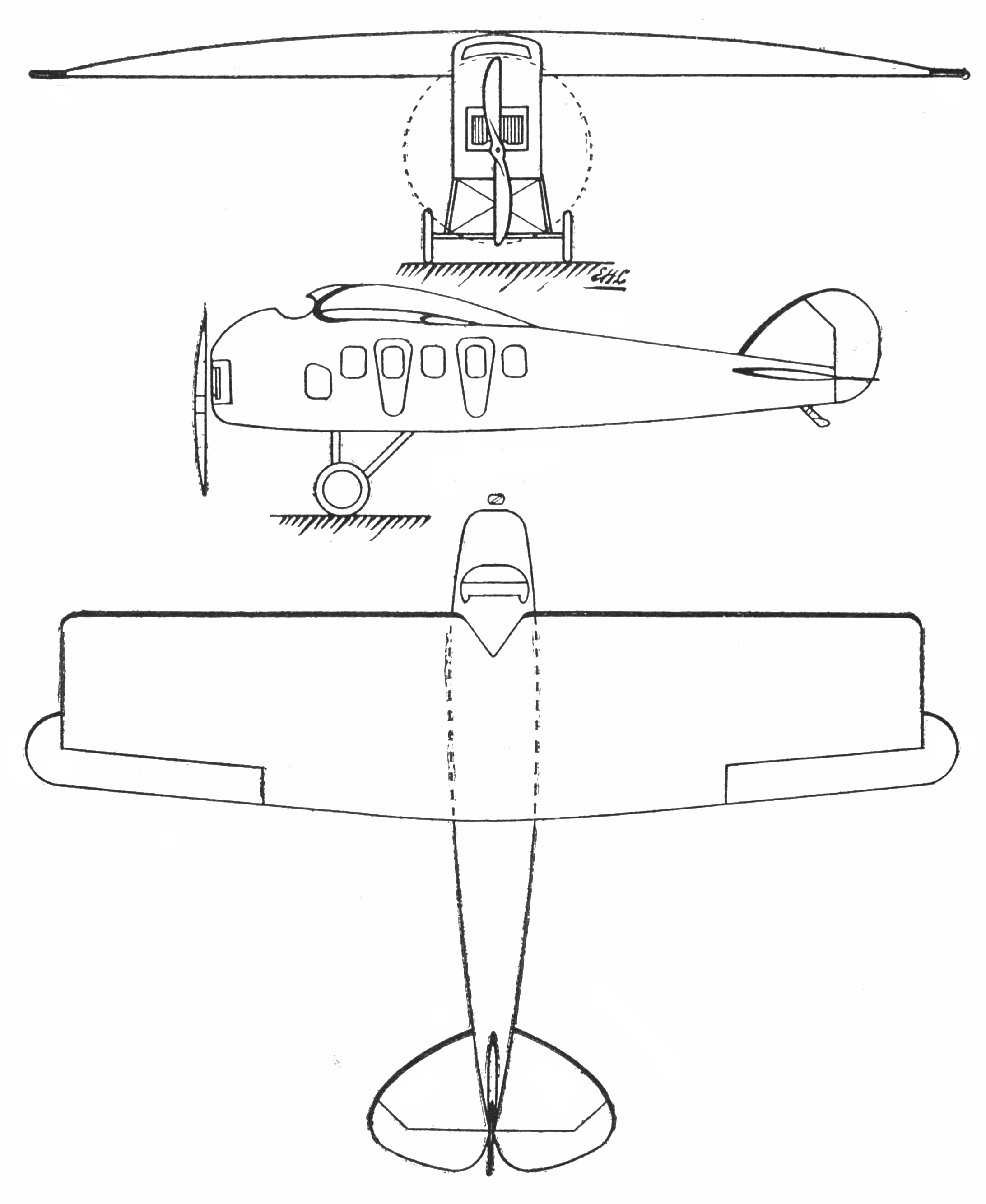
Schematic of the Albatros

The Albatros L 57 was an early monoplane. It was a project for an airliner but was never completed, and as such never entered production. The top covering of the fuselage is swept up higher as compared to other similar planes of the era. The plane was designed to have up to six passengers.

== Specifications ==
- Engine: Mercedes D.IIIa
- Length: 10.42 m
- Height: 3.55 m
- Span: 14.20 m
- Wing area: 34.50 m^{2}
- Weights: empty: 1036 kg; flying weight: 1850 kg
- Max. speed at sea level: 149 km/h
- Cruising speed at sea level: 120 km/h
- Ceiling: 3450 m
- Range on full tank: 540 km
