= Albatros D.II =

German fighter aircraft

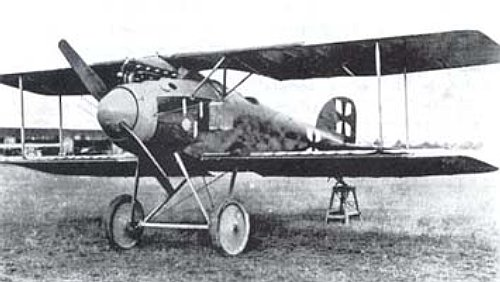

General information
- Type: Fighter
- Manufacturer: Albatros Flugzeugwerke
- Designer: Robert Thelen
- Primary users: Luftstreitkräfte Luftfahrtruppen
- Number built: 291

History
- Introduction date: 1916
- Developed from: Albatros D.I
- Developed into: Albatros D.III

The Albatros D.II was a German fighter aircraft used during World War I. After a successful combat career in the early Jagdstaffeln, it was gradually superseded by the Albatros D.III.

== Design and development ==
Albatros designers Robert Thelen, Schubert and Gnädig produced the D.II in response to pilot complaints about poor upward vision in the Albatros D.I. The solution was to reposition the upper wing 36 cm (14 in) closer to the fuselage and stagger it forward slightly. Rearrangement of the cabane struts also improved the forward view. The D.II otherwise retained the same fuselage, engine installation and armament as the D.I. Basic performance was unchanged. The Idflieg (Inspektion der Fliegertruppen - Inspectorate of Flying Troops), ordered an initial batch of 100 D.II aircraft in August 1916.

In November 1916, Idflieg banned Windhoff "ear" radiators in operational aircraft because they were at a lower level than the crankcase of the engine they were cooling, and a shot into either radiator was likely to drain the cooling system. Late production D.IIs switched to using a Teves und Braun "airfoil shape" radiator in the centre section of the upper wing. This also proved to be problematic as a leaking or battle-damaged radiator could scald the pilot's face. On later Albatros fighters (late models of the D.III, and the D.V) the radiator was moved to the right of the centre section to alleviate this problem.

Oeffag (Oesterreichische Flugzeugfabrik AG) also built the D.II under license, as the Albatros D.II (Oef) / Oeffag Va.53 / Oeffag series 53, for the Luftfahrtruppen. The 16 Austro-Hungarian machines used a 138 kW (185 hp) Austro-Daimler engine, and were fitted with a Teves und Braun-style wing mounted radiator.

== Operational history ==
D.IIs formed part of the early equipment of Jagdstaffel (Jasta) 2, the first specialized fighter squadron in the German air service. Famous pilots included Hauptmann Oswald Boelcke (Jasta 2's first commander) and Manfred von Richthofen. With its high speed and heavy armament, the D.II won back air superiority from Allied fighter types such as the Airco DH.2 and Nieuport 17.

Albatros built 200 D.II aircraft. LVG (Luft-Verkehrs-Gesellschaft) produced another 75 under license. Service numbers peaked in January 1917, when 214 machines were in service. The D.II operated well into 1917. As late as 30 June 1917, 72 aircraft were in the frontline inventory, and even in November, 11 D.IIs and 9 D.Is were still in service, alongside the far more numerous D.IIIs and D.Vs.

Manfred von Richthofen was flying an Albatros D.II on 23 November 1916 when he was engaged in a prolonged dogfight with the RFC's Lanoe Hawker, VC. Hawker's DH.2 pusher engined fighter had a better turning circle but the Albatros D.II had twin guns, was faster, and could maintain height in a turn better. After firing some 900 rounds, von Richthofen shot Hawker in the head and killed him for his 11th victory. Hawker's machine crashed and von Richthofen claimed Hawker's Lewis gun for his growing collection of trophies.

== Operators ==
Austria-Hungary

- Austro-Hungarian Imperial and Royal Aviation Troops

German Empire

- Luftstreitkräfte

Poland

- Polish Air Force operated this type postwar.

Turkey

- Ottoman Air Force

== Specifications (D.II (Oef) series 53) ==
Data from Austro-Hungarian Army Aircraft of World War One

General characteristics

- Crew: 1
- Length: 7.35 m (24 ft 1 in)
- Upper wingspan: 8.5 m (27 ft 11 in)
- Lower wingspan: 8 m (26 ft 3 in)
- Height: 2.71 m (8 ft 11 in)
- Wing area: 24 m^{2} (260 sq ft)
- Gross weight: 898 kg (1,980 lb)
- Powerplant: 1 × Austro-Daimler 185hp 6-cylinder water-cooled in-line piston engine, 138 kW (185 hp)
- Propellers: 2-bladed fixed-pitch wooden propeller

Performance

- Maximum speed: 170 km/h (110 mph, 92 kn)
- Time to altitude:

- 1,000 m (3,300 ft) in 4 minutes 30 seconds
- 2,000 m (6,600 ft) in 7 minutes
- 3,000 m (9,800 ft) in 12 minutes 30 seconds

- Wing loading: 37.5 kg/m^{2} (7.7 lb/sq ft)
- Power/mass: 0.20 hp/kg

Armament

- Guns: 2 × 8 mm (0.315 in) Schwarzlose machine guns

== See also ==
Related development

- Albatros D.I
- Albatros D.III
- Albatros D.IV
- Albatros D.V

Aircraft of comparable role, configuration, and era

- Halberstadt D.II
- Nieuport 16
- Nieuport 17

Related lists

- List of military aircraft of Germany
- List of fighter aircraft
