= Albatros C.I =

1910s German aircraft

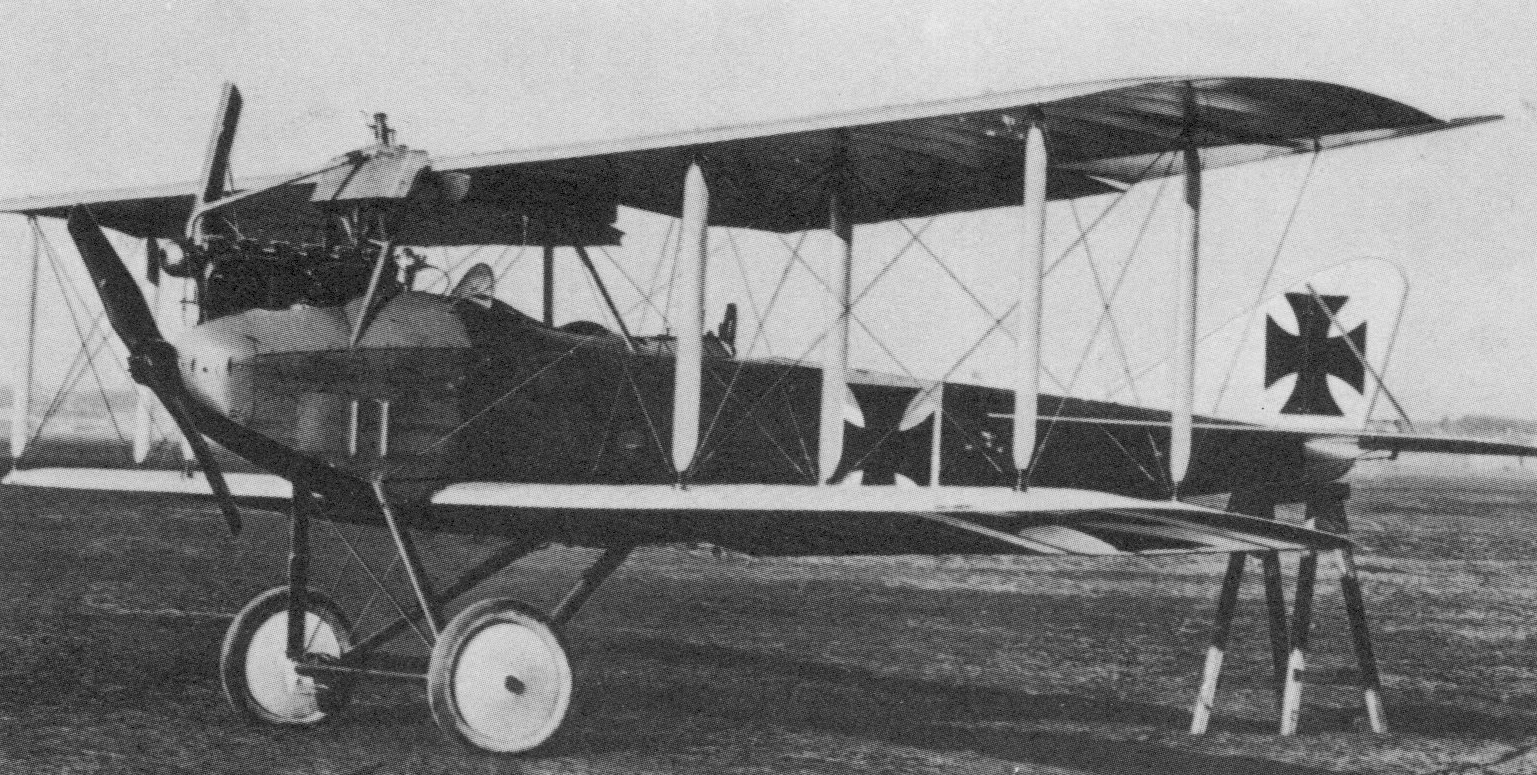

General information
- Type: Reconnaissance aircraft
- Manufacturer: Albatros Flugzeugwerke
- Primary users: Luftstreitkräfte Polish Air Force; Lithuanian Air Force

History
- Introduction date: 1915
- Retired: 1917
- Developed from: Albatros B.II
- Variant: Albatros C.III

The Albatros C.I, (post-war company designations L.6 & L.7), was a twin-seat general-purpose biplanes designed and produced by the German aircraft manufacturer Albatros Flugzeugwerke. It was the first of the successful C-series aircraft operated by the Luftstreitkräfte.

During the opening year of the First World War, unarmed aircraft such as the Albatros B.II became increasingly vulnerable to the increasing numbers of armed military aircraft fielded by the Allies. In response to a requirement formulated in late 1914, Albatros designed the C.I; based on the B.II, the C.I reversed the pilot and observer seating so that the observer occupied the rear cockpit which was provisioned with a machine gun, typically a ring-mounted 7.92 mm (0.312 in) Parabellum MG14. The aircraft was also furnished with a more powerful powerplant, such as the 150 hp (110 kW) Benz Bz.III or a 160 hp (120 kW) Mercedes D.III engine, and had relatively favourable flying characteristics.

During late April 1915, the type entered frontline service with the Luftstreitkräfte; it quickly proved itself to be a success and 228 aircraft were operational by the end of the year, comprising 42% of the total strength of C-type aircraft. Amongst its various roles, it became used as a fighter aircraft, noted pilots such as Oswald Boelcke and Manfred von Richthofen flew in the type. It performed various mission roles, including aerial reconnaissance, artillery spotting, and even bombing. Improvements to the C.I ultimately resulted in the Albatros C.III, which led to the aircraft being withdrawn from active combat on the Western Front during 1916. It continued to be used in the secondary trainer role, being outfitted with dual controls for training new pilots as well as observers. The C.I remained operational in German service through to the Armistice of 11 November 1918 that ended the conflict. The C.I saw further use in the hands of other operators, including the Lithuanian Air Force, Polish Air Force, and the Swedish Air Force.

== Design and development ==
In late 1914, the German Luftstreitkräfte, the air service of the Imperial German Army, developed a requirement for two-seat aircraft, the C-type, powered by engines of at least 150 hp (110 kW) and armed with at least one machine gun. The Albatros Flugzeugwerke's design team, headed by the aeronautical engineer Robert Thelen, opted to produce an aircraft to fulfil this requirement; this aircraft, the C.I, was a development of Albatros' unarmed B.II biplane. This new design was visibly larger than the preceding aircraft. Other key differences between the C.I and the B.II included its use of a more powerful engine, while the pilot was moved to the front cockpit, the observer being instead seated in the rear cockpit and provided with a flexibly mounted machine gun, which was usually a Parabellum MG 14, but sometimes the less satisfactory Bergmann MG 15 was also used.

The fuselage of the C.I was, much like the B.II, was primarily composed of plywood. The primary structural members comprised four longerons of mixed construction, comprising ash forward of the cockpit and spruce to the aft, to which numerous plywood slab panels lining the aircraft were attached. The design of the fuselage, which eliminated the need for internal bracing, was commonplace amongst the company's twin-seat aircraft. Again similar to the B.II, the aircraft's wing structure had the rearward of its two spars positioned roughly in the middle of the wing, which made the trailing edge atypically flexible and thus gave the aircraft a level of inherent stability. None of the flight control surfaces were balanced.

The C.I was powered by a 150 hp (110 kW) Benz Bz.III or a 160 hp (120 kW) Mercedes D.III engine, which were both water-cooled six-cylinder inline engines, depending on availability. Aircraft flown by the Imperial German Navy were equipped with the 150 hp (110 kW) Rapp Rp III engine, as the service had been denied access to the preferred Benz or Mercedes engines. Despite attention paid by the design team to streamlining the aircraft in general, this was somewhat negated by the radiators. The majority of early aircraft had their radiators attached to the side of the fuselage, but this arrangement was substituted for on later-built C.Is, which instead used a radiator that was fitted to the centre-section of the upper wing's leading edge.

During 1915, roughly 485 C.Is were ordered from Albatros while a further 88 C.Is were ordered from Luft-Fahrzeug-Gesellschaft (which used the trade name Roland for its aircraft). Furthermore, 56 C.Is were ordered from Albatros' Austro-Hungarian subsidiary Ostdeutsche Albatros Werke (OAW) for the Austro-Hungarian Aviation Troops.

In 1917, in response to a growing demands for training its aircrew, the Luftstreitkräfte placed a series of very large orders for trainer aircraft, which included the C.I. The Bayerische Flugzeug-Werke (BFW) built the C.Ia, designed to be powered by the 180 hp (130 kW) Argus As III, while the C.Ib, powered by a Mercedes D.III, was built by Mercur Flugzeugbau. During August 1918, Albatros and Mercur received orders for a new trainer version, the C.If, with pneumatic springs replacing the rubber shock cords used in the aircraft's undercarriage owing to shortages of raw materials, although it unclear how many, if any, C.Ifs were completed. Improvements to the C.I resulted in the Albatros C.III which became the most prolific of the Albatros C-types.

== Operational history ==
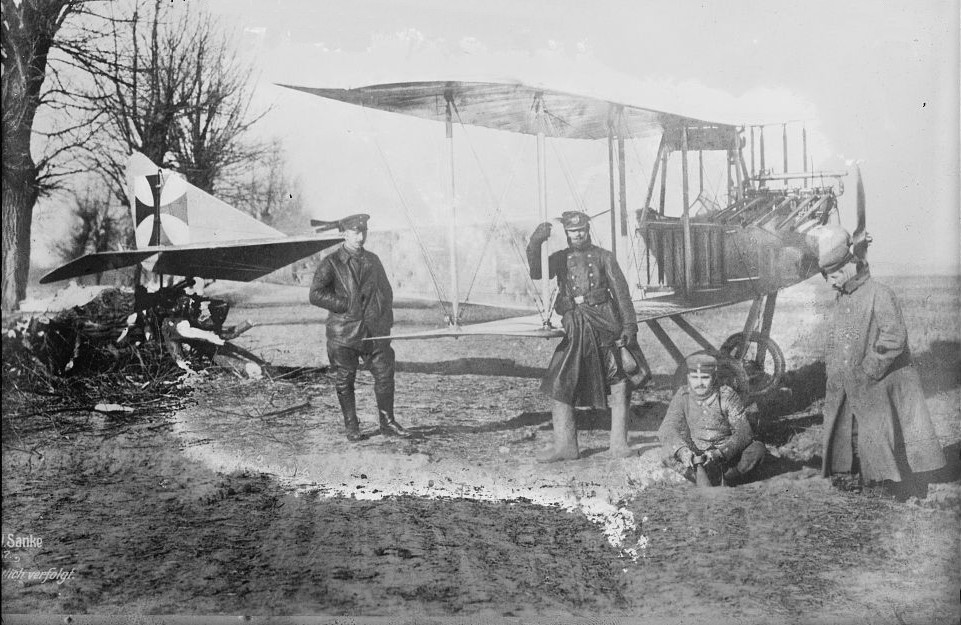
A German C.I on the Eastern Front, circa 1915

During late April 1915, the C.I began to reach frontline units of the Luftstreitkräfte; it served in aerial reconnaissance, artillery spotting, bombing, and photography roles. The type proved to be successful, demonstrating its favourable performance, easy handling, and robust construction, qualities that made the aircraft popular with its crews.

Its effective armament also resulted in the C.I being used as a fighter aircraft; Oswald Boelcke claimed his first victory while flying a C.I with Lt. von Wühlisch as the gunner. When flown in the fighter role, pilots often flew relatively aggressively, intentionally positioning their aircraft into favourable positions for the observer to open fire upon enemies. Boelcke's success quickly inspired other crews; Germany's most famous aviator of the First World War, Manfred von Richthofen, also began his career as an observer in the C.I on the Eastern Front. Typically, those pilots who demonstrated their effectiveness in the fighter role with the C.I would be transferred to dedicated fighter aircraft.

Throughout the rest of 1915, increasing numbers of C.Is were delivered and introduced; by the end of that year, it had become one of the most numerous C-type aircraft of the front, comprising 228 aircraft or 42% of the total strength of C-type aircraft in service. Despite these numbers, the type had a relatively short frontline service life, being phased out of use on the Western Front during 1916 after units were replaced by the more capable Albatros C.III. The C.I continued to see frontline action on the Eastern Front against the Russians well into 1917.

The C.I's viceless handling heavily lent the type to its future use in the training role. It was operated for both the training of the crews of observation aircraft and, when outfitted with dual controls, as a pilot trainer. In this capacity, the aircraft remained in use by the Luftstreitkräfte through to the end of the conflict.

== Variants ==
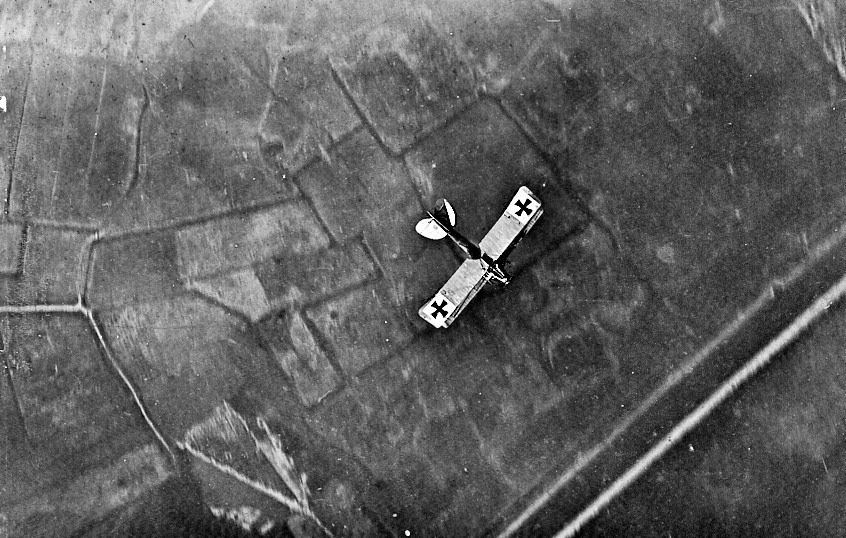
Above view of a C.I, circa 1916

C.I
Two-seat reconnaissance aircraft. First production version.
C.Ia
Improved version powered by more powerful Argus As III engine, built by BFW and by LFG
C.Ib
Dual-control training version built by Mercur Flugzeugbau.
C.If
C.Ifd
C.I-V
Experimental aircraft. One built.

== Operators ==
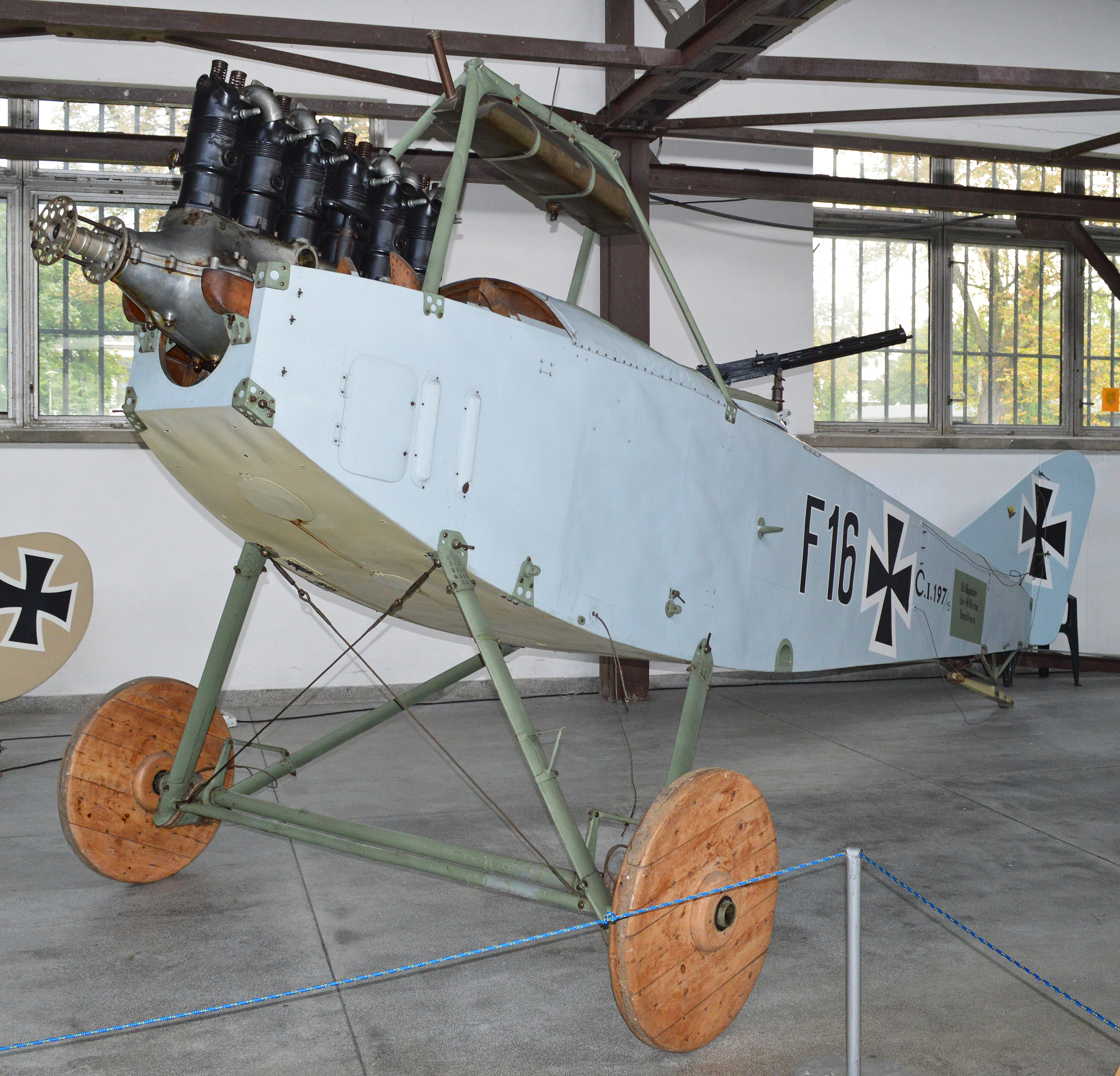
A preserved C.I on static display

Bulgaria

- Bulgarian Air Force

German Empire

- Luftstreitkräfte

Lithuania

- Lithuanian Air Force operated this type postwar.

Poland

- Polish Air Force operated 49 aircraft postwar.

Sweden

- Swedish Air Force (Postwar)

Turkey

- Ottoman Air Force

== Specifications (C.I) ==
Data from German Aircraft of the First World War

General characteristics

- Crew: 2
- Length: 7.85 m (25 ft 9 in)
- Wingspan: 12.9 m (42 ft 4 in)
- Height: 3.14 m (10 ft 4 in)
- Wing area: 40.4 m^{2} (435 sq ft)
- Empty weight: 875 kg (1,929 lb)
- Gross weight: 1,190 kg (2,624 lb)
- Powerplant: 1 × Mercedes D.III six-cylinder water-cooled in-line piston engine, 120 kW (160 hp)
- Propellers: 2-bladed wooden fixed-pitch propeller

Performance

- Maximum speed: 132 km/h (82 mph, 71 kn)
- Endurance: 2½ hours
- Service ceiling: 3,000 m (9,800 ft)
- Rate of climb: 1.7 m/s (330 ft/min)

Armament

- Guns: 1 × 7.92 mm (0.312 in) Parabellum MG14 machine gun in observer's cockpit

== See also ==
Related development

- Albatros B.II
- Albatros C.III

Aircraft of comparable role, configuration, and era

- Royal Aircraft Factory B.E.2
- LVG C.II
- Rumpler C.I

Related lists

- List of military aircraft of Germany
