= Albatros W.4 =

1916 fighter floatplane by Albatros

W.4
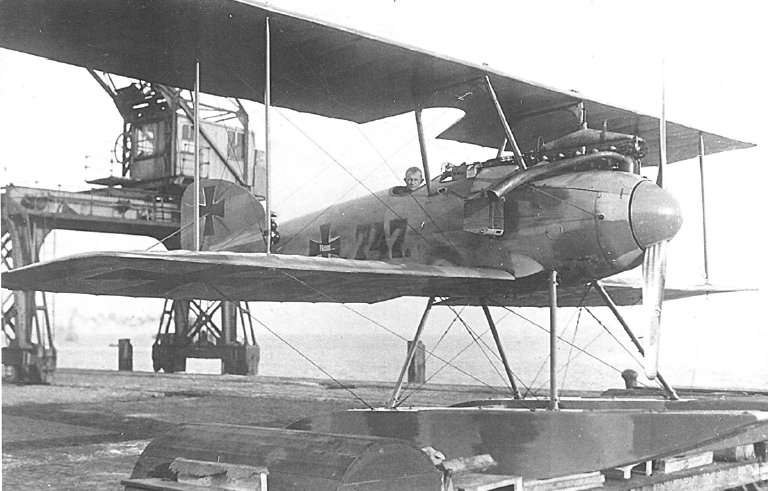
- First prototype of Albatros W.IV, No.747

General information
- Type: Fighter
- Manufacturer: Albatros Flugzeugwerke
- Primary user: Luftstreitkräfte
- Number built: 118

History
- Manufactured: 1916–1917
- First flight: 1916
- Retired: 1918
- Developed from: Albatros D.I

The Albatros W.4 was a military floatplane designed and produced by the German aircraft manufacturer Albatros Flugzeugwerke.

The W.4 was a derivative of the Albatros D.I land-based fighter aircraft, furnished with a new wing and tail section of greater span than the D.I. It was powered by the same 120 kW (160 hp) Mercedes D.III engine as fitted to the D.I while its fuselage was also based upon its predecessor. The first production series W.4s were armed with one lMG08 7.92 mm (.312 in) machine gun, while later built aircraft carried two guns. While early production aircraft were equipped with ailerons only on the upper wings, those built later on had ailerons on all four wings instead.

Performing its maiden flight during 1916, a total of three prototypes were produced. The W.4 was first used in combat in September 1916; it would be operated in both the North Sea and the Baltic Sea. The final aircraft was delivered in December 1917. It was displaced from frontline duties by newer twin-seat floatplanes.

== Development ==
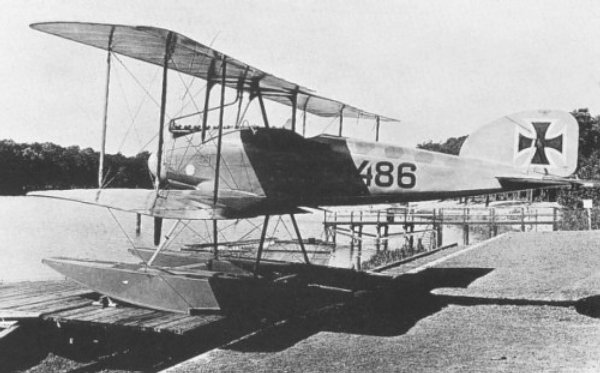
An Albatros W.4, circa 1917

The origins of the Albatros W.4 can be traced to the Imperial German Navy who, in 1916, sought a new single-seat floatplane with which to counter the growing use of both flying boats and floatplanes by the Allies powers, particularly Britain. The adaption of land-based aircraft to fulfil this requirement was encouraged in order to expedite its arrival. Multiple companies opted to respond to this need, including the Hansa-Brandenburg KDW, Rumpler 6B, and the Albatros W.4.

Albatros developed the W.4 as a derivative from their existing land-based fighter aircraft, the Albatros D.I. It was considerably larger than its land-based predecessor, the design having been reworked substantially in some areas, such as the tail section, which was enlarged considerably and lacked an under-fin. The fuselage of the D.I was used as a basis and the two aircraft shared the same basic structural elements of longerons and formers covered by plywood. Steel was used extensively in the structure of the tail unit, such as bracing struts and the framework of both the elevator and rudder. The wing structure was considerably different from that of the D.I, using elongated and strengthened centre-section steel struts to accommodate the greater span of the wing.

Early aircraft were equipped with inversely tapered ailerons on the upper wings only, but this configuration gave the W.4 relatively slow lateral control, thus a revised arrangement using ailerons on all four wings, interlinked using a steel strut, was promptly implemented to improve this performance. While investigating the aircraft's optimum takeoff performance, the W.4 was outfitted with a variety of different floats, which included single-step, double-step, flat top, and curved top designs. Regardless of the design of the floats used, a steel chassis was used to support the floats along with wire bracing. Two separate fuel tanks, holding 73 litres each, gave the W.4 considerable endurance for its size.

== Operational history ==
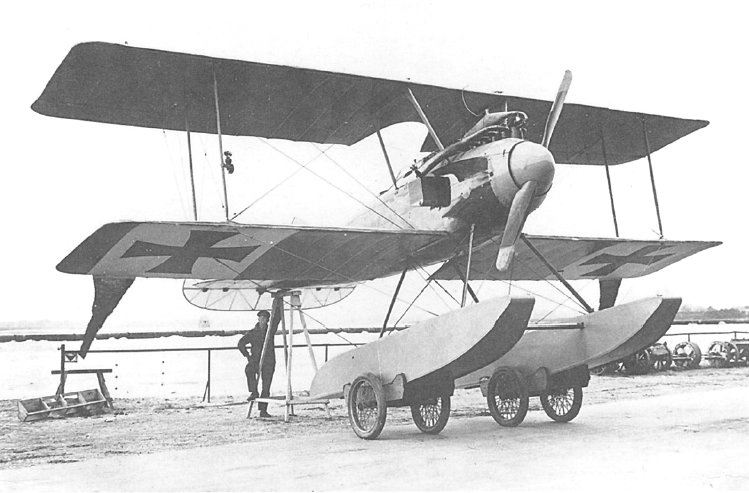
The first prototype of the Albatros W.4

During September 1916, the W.4 commenced combat operations. A total of 118 aircraft, including three prototypes, were built between June 1916 and December 1917.

It was operated both in the North Sea and the Baltic Sea; it proved to be both relatively fast and agile for a floatplane. The W.4 typically had the upper hand over most enemy seaplanes encountered, particularly in terms of armament, unless the aircraft came up against the heavier flying boats operated by the Royal Navy. It was ultimately eclipsed by the arrival of faster twin-seat floatplanes produced by rival German aircraft manufacturer Hansa-Brandenburg. The final use of the W.4 was in the trainer role.

== Operators ==
- German Empire
  - Luftstreitkräfte – 118 aircraft
- Austria-Hungary
  - KuKLFT – 8 aircraft delivered in July 1918

== Specifications (W.4) ==
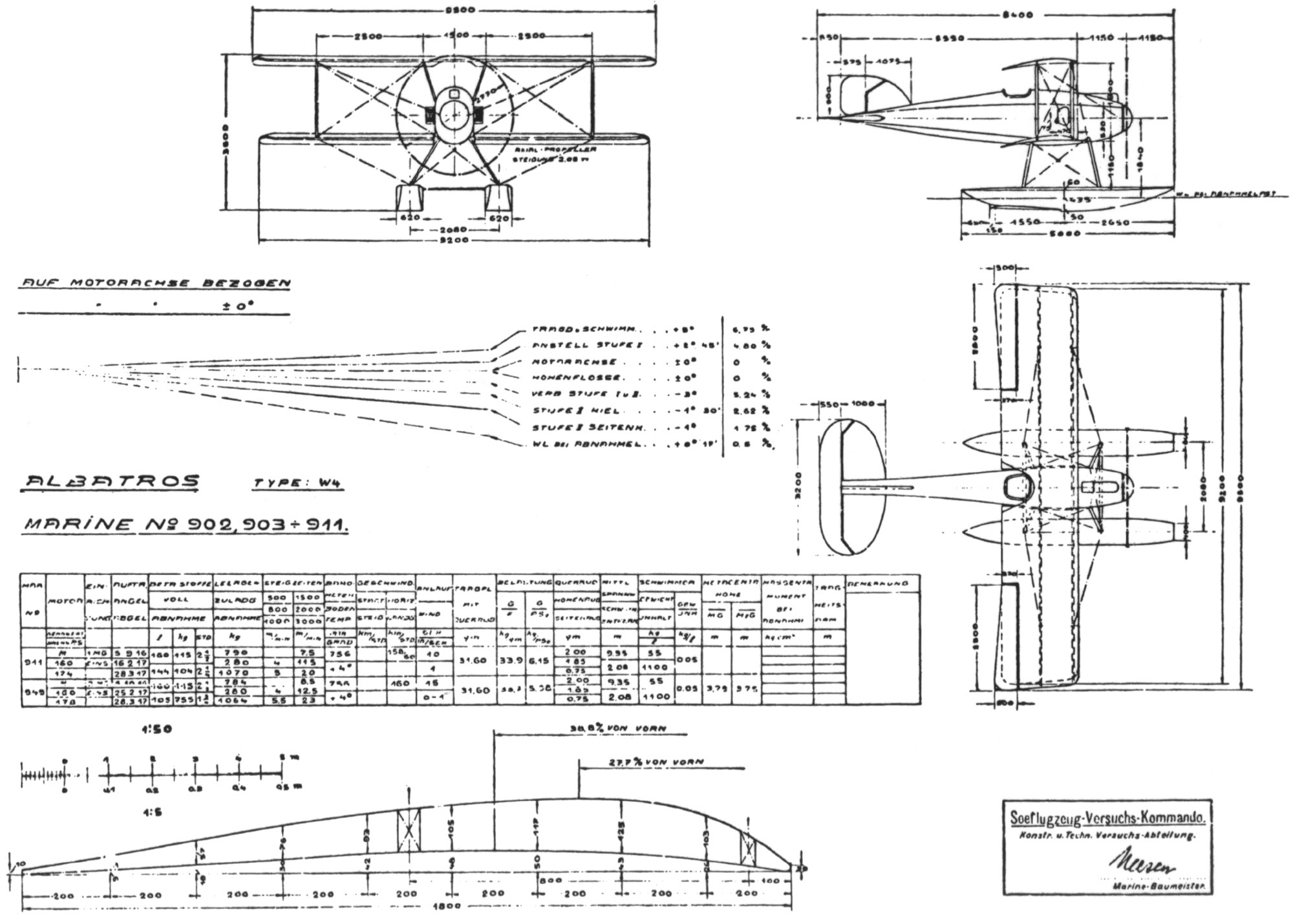
Albatros W.4 drawing

Data from German Aircraft of the First World War

General characteristics

- Crew: 1
- Length: 8.5 m (27 ft 11 in)
- Wingspan: 9.5 m (31 ft 2 in)
- Height: 3.65 m (12 ft 0 in)
- Wing area: 31.6 m^{2} (340 sq ft)
- Empty weight: 790 kg (1,742 lb)
- Powerplant: 1 × Mercedes D.III six-cylinder water-cooled in-line piston engine, 120 kW (160 hp)
- Propellers: 2-bladed fixed-pitch wooden propeller

Performance

- Maximum speed: 158–160 km/h (98–99 mph, 85–86 kn)
- Endurance: 3 hours
- Service ceiling: 2,890 m (9,480 ft)
- Time to altitude: 1,000 m (3,300 ft) in five minutes

Armament

- Guns: 1 or 2 × forward-firing 7.92 mm (.312 in) lMG 08 machine guns
