= Enno Walther Huth =

German industrialist (1875–1964)

- Born: 8 October 1875; Altenburg, German Empire
- Died: 31 May 1964; Frankfurt am Main, West Germany
- Occupation: entrepreneur
- Era: 1900
- Known for: pioneer of the Luftstreitkräfte

Enno Walther Huth (Altenburg, 8 October 1875 - Frankfurt am Main, 31 May 1964) was a German industrialist, pioneer of the Luftstreitkräfte.

== Biography ==
Huth was the son of Major Johann Ernst (1832-1897) and his wife Emilie (1838-1921) family with military traditions. In 1905 he married Elsa Bachstein (1878-1968), daughter of the railroad entrepreneur Hermann Bachstein. Left after 13 years as an officer in the military and from 1908 to 1912 he studied biology. He finished his studies and graduated in 1909, met in Berlin the French aviator Hubert Latham. Huth showed the desire to produce aircraft in Germany. Founded as the Albatros Flugzeugwerke in Johannisthal. Later aircraft produced under license by a French manufacturer. Later he worked with designers such as Ernst Heinkel or Hirth. The Albatros-Werke provided the first aircraft for the Luftstreitkräfte. During World War I many aircraft and components were manufactured by Albatros. Huth was an intelligence officer.

== Awards ==
Huth was president of the National Federation of the German Aerospace.

== Bibliography ==
- P., Supf (1956). Das Buch der deutschen Fluggeschichte. f.
- Behrsing, Gert (1974). Huth, Enno Walther. Deutsche Biographie 10.

== Related items ==
- Albatros Flugzeugwerke
