= Albatros L.66 =

L.66
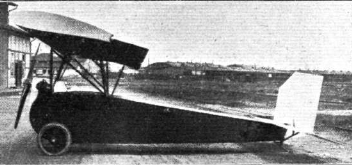

General information
- Type: Light aircraft
- National origin: Germany
- Manufacturer: Albatros Flugzeugwerke
- Number built: 10

History
- First flight: 1924

The Albatros L.66 was a simple, low powered, two seat sports and training parasol wing monoplane, built in Germany in the mid-1920s.

== Design and development ==
The L.66 was intended to be a low cost, easy maintenance two-seater. Thus a low power engine was required and the prototype was fitted with a 30 hp (22 kW) Haacke HFM-2 flat twin, though other engines could be used. It was a cantilever parasol monoplane with an aerodynamically thick airfoil section wing, which had a simple, rectangular plan and significant dihedral. The wing was a wooden structure with two spars, the ailerons mounted directly to a rounded groove in the rear spar. It was linked to the upper fuselage by a rather complicated set of struts.

Traditionally, Albatros had constructed fuselages with wood frames, but the L.66 marked a departure, with a welded steel tube longeron and strut framework covered with fabric. The sides were flat and almost airfoil-shaped, with a blunt, rounded nose and taper aft. The nose-mounted engine, driving a two-blade propeller, was raised above the fuselage with a fairing behind it, enclosing the oil tank and with the instrument panel attached to its rear. The fuel tank was in the wing centre section, feeding the engine by gravity. Further aft, pilot and passenger sat side by side in the 1.2 m (3 ft 11 in) wide fuselage; tandem controls could be fitted if required. The empennage was simple in shape and action as there were no fixed surfaces, only an all-moving rudder and elevator. Both control surfaces were balanced. The conventional undercarriage was also very simple, with the mainwheels attached to a single axle which passed through the fuselage, sitting the L.66 close to the ground. The tailskid was linked to the rudder for steering on the ground

== Operational history ==
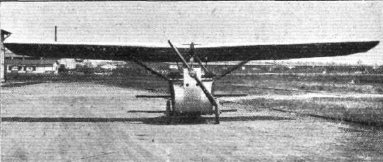
Prototype with Haake engine

The first L.66 was flying in mid-1924 with the Haacke engine. In all ten were built.

== Variants ==
L.66
Haacke engine.
L.66a
Slightly larger and heavier, with Stahlwerk Mark St.M3 or Anzani engine.
L.66c
L.67
Lighter version, Bristol Cherub or Anzani engine. Two built.

== Specifications (Haacke engine) ==
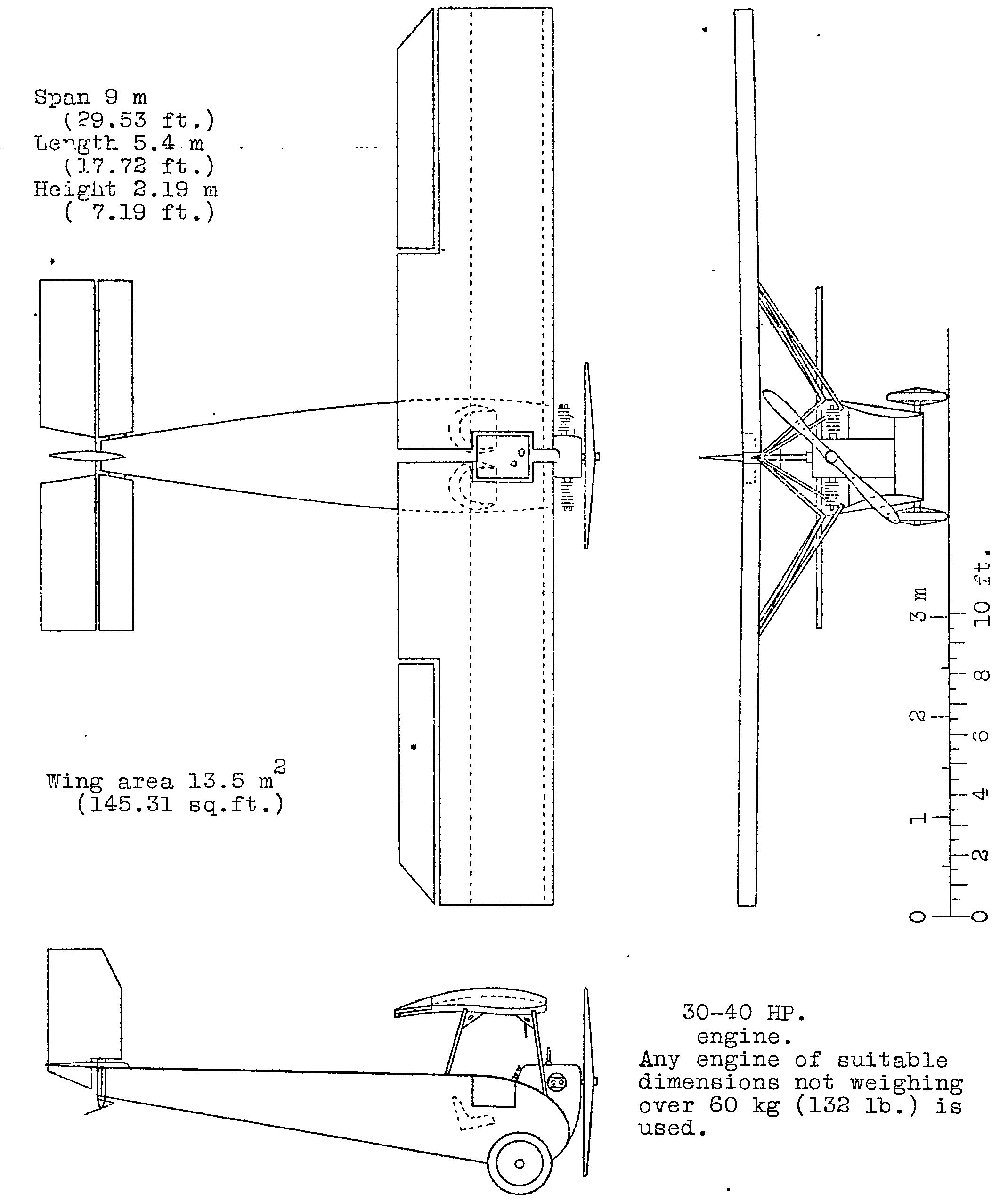
Albatros L 66 3-view drawing from NACA-TM-301

Data from Flight, 6 June 1924, pp.385

General characteristics

- Capacity: Two
- Length: 5.40 m (17 ft 9 in)
- Wingspan: 9.00 m (29 ft 6 in)
- Wing area: 13.5 m^{2} (145 sq ft)
- Empty weight: 220 kg (485 lb)
- Gross weight: 395 kg (871 lb)
- Fuel capacity: 33 L
- Powerplant: 1 × Haacke HFM-2 air-cooled, horizontally opposed two cylinder, 22 kW (30 hp)
- Propellers: 2-bladed

Performance

- Maximum speed: 100 km/h (62 mph, 54 kn)
- Endurance: 3 hr at full power
- Time to altitude: about 15 min to 1,000 m (3,280 ft)
