= Albatros D.I =

Type of aircraft

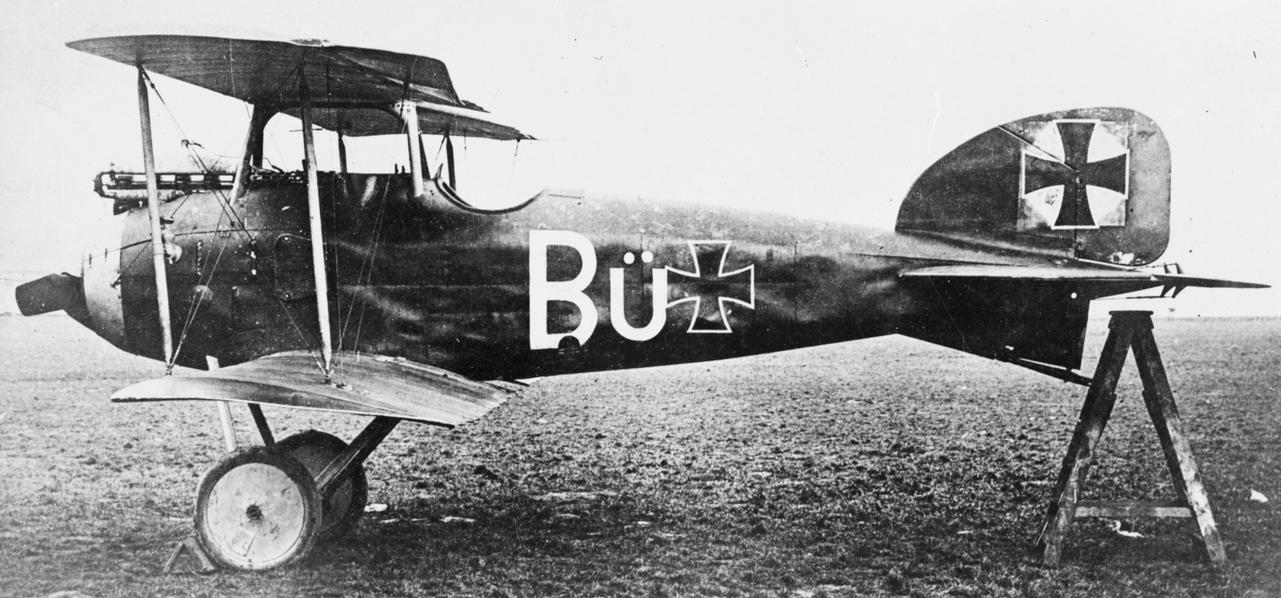

General information
- Type: Fighter
- Manufacturer: Albatros Flugzeugwerke
- Designer: Robert Thelen
- Primary user: Luftstreitkräfte
- Number built: 50

History
- Introduction date: August 1916
- Developed into: Albatros D.II; Albatros W.4

The Albatros D.I was an early fighter aircraft designed and produced by the German aircraft manufacturer Albatros Flugzeugwerke. It was the first of the Albatros D types which equipped the majority of the German and Austrian fighter squadrons (Jagdstaffeln) for the last two years of the First World War. Despite this, the D.I had a relatively brief operational career, having been rapidly eclipsed by rapid advances in fighter aircraft.

The D.I was designed by Robert Thelen, R. Schubert and Gnädig, as an answer to the latest Allied fighters, such as the Nieuport 11 Bébé and the Airco D.H.2, which had proved superior to the Fokker Eindecker and other early German fighters, and established a general Allied air superiority. It featured a then-radical semi-monocoque fuselage design that was paired with a relatively powerful six-cylinder water cooled inline engine. Unlike the majority of preceding aircraft, the D.I could be armed with twin fixed Spandau machine-guns without incurring a meaningful performance loss.

The D.I was ordered into production during June 1916 and introduced into service with the Luftstreitkräfte only two months later. While not being a particularly maneuverable aircraft even at the time of its introduction, the aircraft proved to be effective in combat, largely due to its superior speed and firepower over most contemporary military aircraft. Despite its success, no more than 50 D.Is were ever produced, having been rapidly eclipsed by the Albatros D.II, which was broadly identical in terms of its design save for the repositioning of the upper wing to be less of a hindrance to pilot visibility.

== Design and development ==
The origins of the D.I can be traced back to the early developments of the fighter aircraft during the First World War; in particular, the Fokker Scourge from July 1915 to early 1916 in which the Central Powers held aerial supremacy over the Allied Powers. German military officials came to recognise that advances were being made by the Allies, such as the Airco DH.2 and Nieuport 11 Bébé, which could best the Fokker Eindecker and thus threatened to gradually tip the balance of power back in their favour. In response, efforts were undertaken to secure Germany's aerial position via the development and introduction of new and more capable fighter aircraft.

The aircraft manufacturer Albatros Flugzeugwerke was amongst those companies approached to produce such a fighter; its design team on the project was headed by Robert Thelen, R. Schubert and Gnädig. The resulting aircraft had an unorthodox appearance for the era, the fuselage being streamlined and relatively sleek. Its construction was a considerable shift for the company, having discarded its established features of fabric coverings and a braced box-girder fusalage in favour of a semi-monocoque one that was composed of plywood, consisting of a single-layered outer shell supported by a minimal internal structure. This was lighter and stronger than the fabric-skinned box-type fuselage then in common use, as well being easier to give an aerodynamically clean shape. At the same time, its panelled-plywood skinning, done with mostly four-sided panels of thin plywood over the entire minimal fuselage structure, was less labour-intensive (and therefore less costly to manufacture) than a "true" monocoque structure.

In spite of the radical design of its fuselage, the wing of D.I adhered to established construction approaches of the era. The wing structure was composed of wood and comprised a rectangular twin-boxspar arrangement; the ribs featured lightening holes and were narrowly flanged with spruce. The top wing was built as a single piece and attached to the fuselage via adjustable eye bolts. It was furnished with mildly tapered ailerons, which had a welded steel tube construction and were actuated via a crank arm. The flight control surfaces of the tail unit were of a similar welded steel tubing with a fabric covering; both the one-piece elevator and rudder had small triangular balance sections. The D.I had a relatively high wing loading for its time, and was not particularly maneuverable. Despite this, the aircraft proved quite effective in combat, as its mundane agility was compensated for by possessing superior speed and firepower to many contemporary military aircraft.

The aircraft was powered by either a 110 kW (150 hp) Benz Bz.III or a 120 kW (160 hp) Mercedes D.III six-cylinder water cooled inline engine. At the time of its introduction, the Mercedes-powered D.I was the most powerful fighter aircraft in German service. The additional power of the Mercedes (Daimler) engine was such that it enabled the fitting of twin fixed Spandau machine-guns without incurring any meaningful loss in performance. Box-shaped Windhoff radiators, mounted on either side of the fuselage between the wings, were used to cool the engine.

Having suitably impressed German officials, an initial order for the D.I was placed in June 1916.

== Operational history ==
During August 1916, the D.I was introduced into squadron service by the Luftstreitkräfte. Upon the type's arrival at the front lines, it was first allocated to senior pilots in place of their older aircraft; as such, it displaced the early Fokker and Halberstadt D types. By November 1916, a total of 50 pre-series and series D.Is were in service. The D.I has been credited with giving real "teeth" to the newly-formed Jagdstaffeln (fighter squadrons) of the Luftstreitkräfte.

According to aviation authors Peter Grey and Owen Thetford, the D.I was the best all-round fighter available at the time of its introduction to service. Despite this, further production of D.Is was not undertaken. Instead, Albatros opted to alter the design of the D.I, chiefly via a reduction in the gap between the upper and lower wing in order to improve the pilot's forward and upward vision, which resulted in the otherwise identical Albatros D.II, which became the company's first major production fighter. The placement of the upper wing on the D.I had been a particular point of criticism as it obscured the pilot's visibility, a factor which proved to be detrimental in aerial combat.

== Operators ==
German Empire

- Luftstreitkräfte

== Specifications (D.I with Benz engine) ==
Data from German Combat Planes: A Comprehensive Survey and History of the Development of German Military Aircraft from 1914 to 1945

General characteristics

- Crew: 1
- Length: 7.4 m (24 ft 3 in)
- Wingspan: 8.5 m (27 ft 11 in)
- Height: 2.95 m (9 ft 8 in)
- Wing area: 22.9 m^{2} (246 sq ft)
- Empty weight: 647 kg (1,426 lb)
- Gross weight: 898 kg (1,980 lb)
- Powerplant: 1 × Benz Bz.III six-cylinder water-cooled in-line piston engine, 110 kW (150 hp)
- Propellers: 2-bladed wooden fixed pitch propeller

Performance

- Maximum speed: 175 km/h (109 mph, 94 kn)
- Endurance: 1.5
- Service ceiling: 5,000 m (16,000 ft)
- Rate of climb: 2.8 m/s (550 ft/min)
- Wing loading: 39.2 kg/m^{2} (8.0 lb/sq ft)

Armament

- Guns: 1 × forward-firing synchronized 7.92 mm (0.312 in) lMG 08 machine gun

== See also ==
Related development

- Albatros D.II

Aircraft of comparable role, configuration, and era

- Nieuport 11
