= Albatros L 45 =

Within military aviation in Germany, the Albatros L.45 was given the Idflieg designation Albatros D.XIIIa.
