= Albatros D.V =

1917 fighter aircraft by Albatros

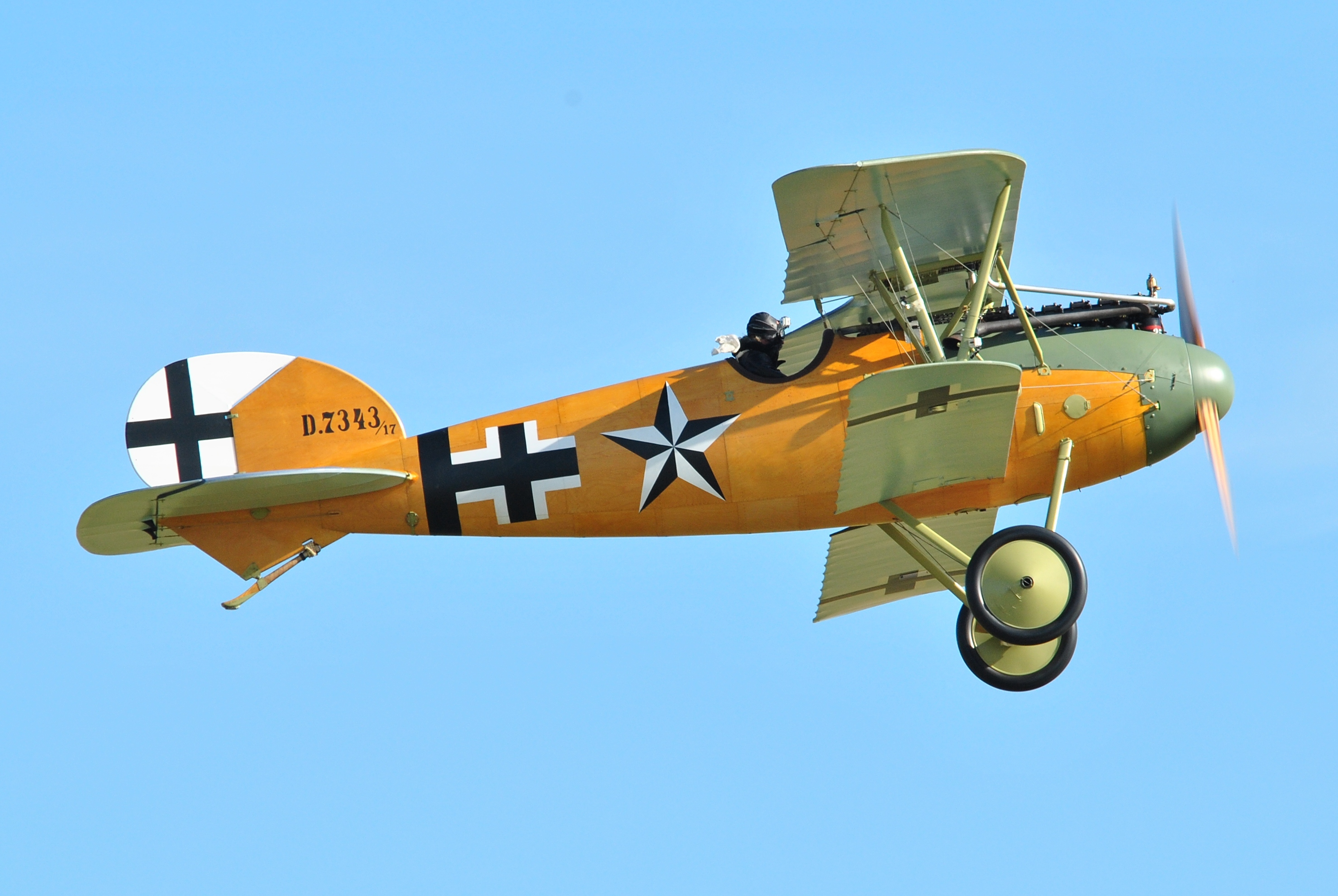
- Albatros D.Va reproduction at Duxford Air Show, 2012

General information
- Type: Fighter
- Manufacturer: Albatros Flugzeugwerke
- Designer: Robert Thelen
- Primary users: Luftstreitkräfte: Kaiserliche Marine; Polish Air Force; Ottoman Air Force
- Number built: c. 2,500

History
- First flight: April 1917
- Developed from: Albatros D.III

The Albatros D.V is a fighter aircraft of the German aircraft manufacturer Albatros Flugzeugwerke. It was the final development of the Albatros D.I family and the last Albatros fighter to see operational service with the Luftstreitkräfte (Imperial German Air Service) during the First World War.

The D.V was developed from the D.III during early 1917. Sharing many similarities to its predecessor, the most visible change was its new elliptical cross-section fuselage. The D.V was brought into service in May 1917 but early operations were plagued by structural failures of the lower wing. With its limited performance improvements this resulted in pilots expressing their preference for the older D.III. Albatros produced the improved D.Va with modifications for greater structural strength, although some structural concerns remained.

Despite its well-known shortcomings and general obsolescence, approximately 900 D.V and 1,612 D.Va aircraft were produced at the Johannisthal and Schneidemühl factories before production was terminated in April 1918. The D.Va continued to fly in German hands until the end of fighting with the Armistice of 11 November 1918. The Polish Air Force and Ottoman Air Force also operated the type. A pair of original D.Va's have been preserved and some airworthy reproductions have been built.

== Design and development ==
In April 1917, Albatros received an order from Inspektion der Fliegertruppen (Idflieg) for an improved version of the D.III. The design process was headed by the aeronautical engineer Robert Thelen, the company's chief designer at Johannisthal. Development proceeded at a rapid pace, the resulting D.V prototype performed its maiden flight late in April 1917. This prototype retained the standard rudder of the Johannisthal-built D.III; subsequent production aircraft used the enlarged rudder featured on D.IIIs built by the Ostdeutsche Albatroswerke (OAW), in what was known as the independent city of Schneidemühl. The D.V had a larger spinner and ventral fin and closely resembled the D.III with the same 127 kW (170 hp) Mercedes D.IIIa engine. The most notable difference was a new, elliptical cross-section fuselage which was 32 kg (71 lb) lighter than the partially flat-sided fuselage of the earlier D.I to D.III designs. The new elliptical cross-section required an additional longeron on each side of the fuselage and the fin, rudder and tailplane initially remained unchanged from the D.III.

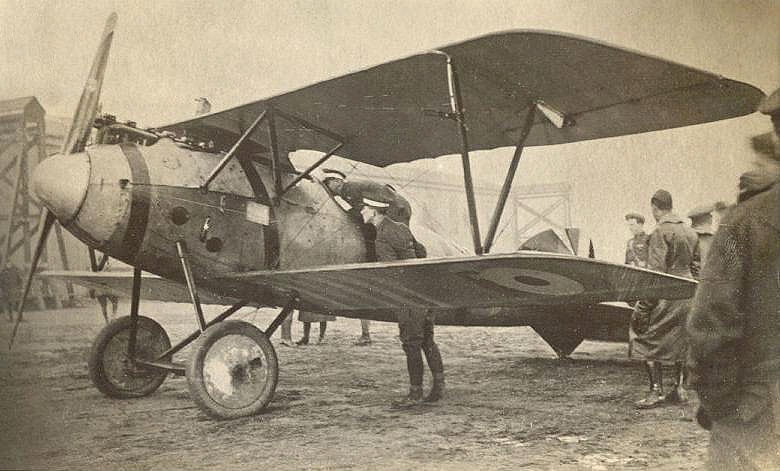
Captured Albatros D.V (serial D.1162/17) with British roundels

Compared to the D.III, the upper wing of the D.V was 121 mm (4.75 in) closer to the fuselage, while the lower wings attached to the fuselage without a fairing. The D.V wings were almost identical to those of the standard D.III, which had adopted a sesquiplane wing arrangement broadly similar to the French Nieuport 11. The only significant difference between wings of the D.III and D.V was a revised routing of the aileron cables that placed them entirely within the upper wing. Idflieg conducted structural tests on the fuselage but not the wings of the D.V.

Early examples of the D.V featured a large headrest but it was usually removed in service as it interfered with the pilot's field of view. The headrest was deleted from the second production batch. Aircraft deployed in Palestine had a pair of wing radiators, better to cope with the warmer climate. Idflieg issued production contracts for 200 D.V aircraft in April 1917, followed by additional orders of 400 in May and 300 in July. Initial production of the D.V was undertaken by the Johannisthal factory, while the Schneidemühl factory produced the D.III for the rest of 1917.

== Operational history ==
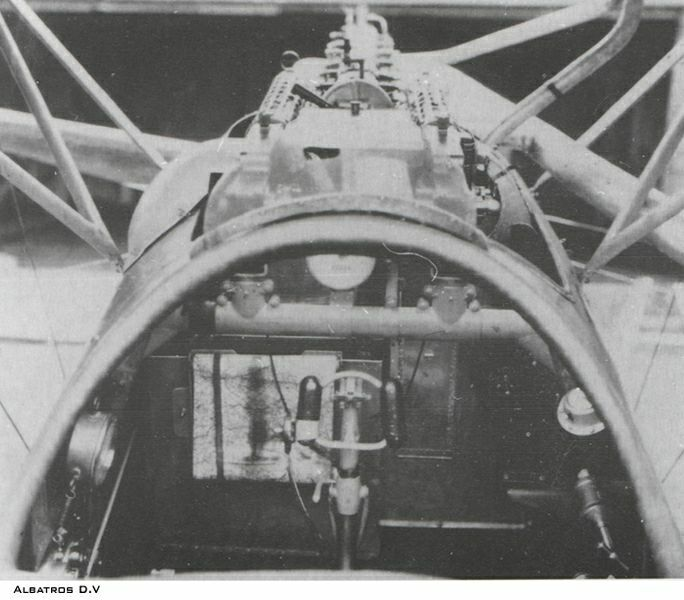
A pilot's-eye-view from the cockpit of an Albatros D.V

The D.V entered service with the German Air Force in May 1917 but losses attributed to structural failures of the lower wing occurred. The aviation historian Jon Guttman said "Within the month Idflieg was doing belated stress testing and concluding, to its dismay, that the D.V's sesquiplane wing layout was even more vulnerable than that of its predecessor". The outboard sections of the D.V upper wing also suffered failures, requiring additional wire bracing and the fuselage sometimes cracked during rough landings. Against these problems, the D.V offered very little improvement in performance. Front line pilots were considerably dismayed and many preferred the older D.III. Manfred von Richthofen was critical of the new aircraft in a July 1917 letter, where he described the D.V as "so obsolete and so ridiculously inferior to the English that one can't do anything with this aircraft". British tests of a captured D.V revealed that the aircraft was slow to manoeuvre, heavy on the controls and tiring to fly.

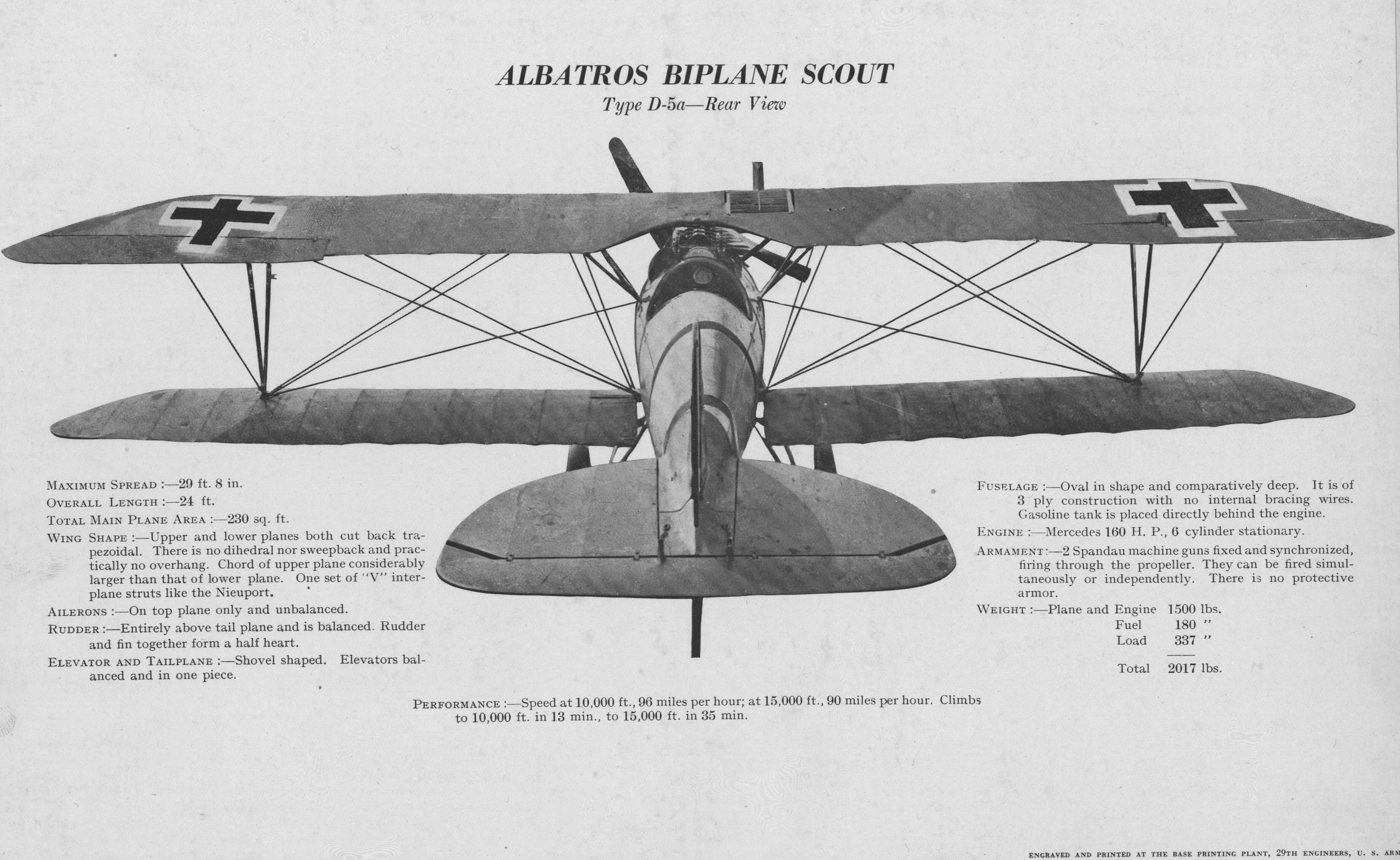
German type D-5a Albatros biplane scout

Albatros responded with the D.Va, which featured stronger wing spars, heavier wing ribs and a reinforced fuselage. The modified D.Va was 23 kg (51 lb) heavier than the D.III but the structural problems were not entirely cured. Use of the high-compression 130 kW (170 hp) Mercedes D.IIIaü engine offset the increased weight of the D.Va. The D.Va also reverted to the D.III aileron cable linkage, running outwards through the lower wing, then upwards to the ailerons, much the same as the earlier Albatros B.I unarmed two-seater had used before 1914, providing a more positive control response. The wings of the D.III and D.Va were interchangeable. To further strengthen the wing, the D.Va added a small diagonal brace connecting the forward interplane strut to the leading edge of the lower wing; the brace was also retrofitted to some D.Vs.

During August 1917, Idflieg placed orders for 262 D.Va aircraft; follow-on orders for another 250 aircraft were received in September and as 550 during the following month. Ostdeutsche Albatros Werke, which had been engaged in production of the D.III, received orders for 600 D.Va aircraft in October. Deliveries of the D.Va commenced in October 1917. The structural problems of the Fokker Dr.I and the mediocre performance of the Pfalz D.III left the Luftstreitkräfte with no alternative to the D.Va until the Fokker D.VII entered service in mid-1918. Production of the D.Va ceased in April 1918. In May 1918, 131 D.V and 928 D.Va aircraft were in service on the Western Front; the numbers declined as the Fokker D.VII and other types replaced the Albatros in the final months of the war. By 31 August, fewer than 400 Albatros fighters of all types remained at the front but they continued in service until the Armistice of 11 November 1918 that ended the conflict.

== Surviving aircraft and reproductions ==
Two D.Va aircraft survive in museums.

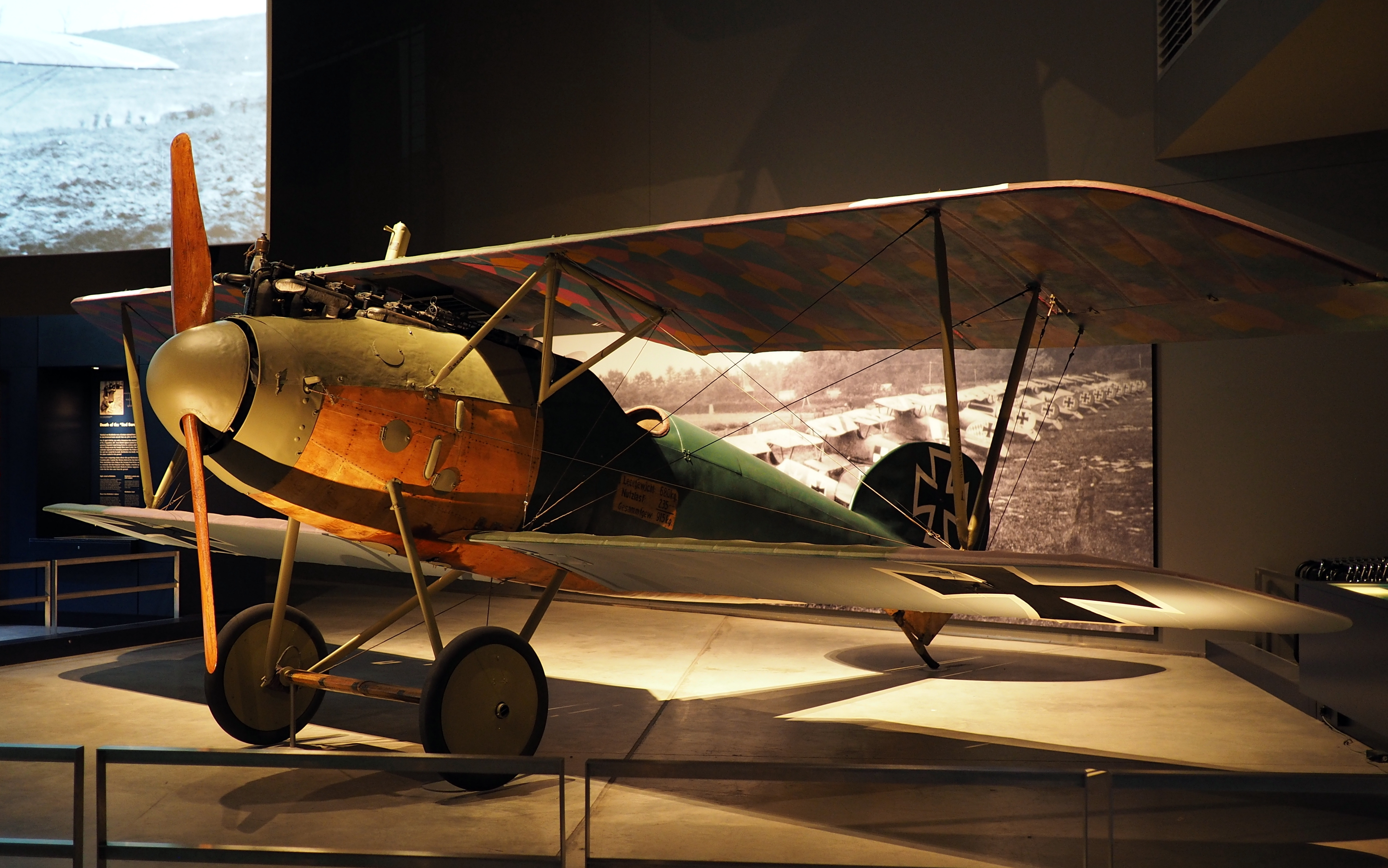
D.Va (serial D.5390/17) on display at the Australian War Memorial in Canberra

- It is believed serial D.7161/17 served with Jasta 46 before being captured sometime in April or May 1918. In 1919, the aircraft was presented to the De Young Museum in San Francisco, California. The National Air and Space Museum acquired the aircraft in 1949. It was placed in storage until restoration began in 1977. Since 1979, D.7161/17 has been on display at the Air and Space Museum, in Washington D.C. This aircraft carries the distinctive personal marking of "Stropp" on the fuselage sides.
- Serial D.5390/17 was shot down during a fight with an Australian Flying Corps R.E.8 on 17 December 1917. It landed intact behind the lines of the 21st Infantry Battalion of the Second Australian Division, AIF. The unit recovered the aircraft and took the pilot, Leutnant Rudolf Clausz of Jasta 29, prisoner. In February 1918, the War Office ceded D.5390/17 to the AFC as a war trophy. It was eventually put on display at the Australian War Memorial. The aircraft was removed from display in 2001 and underwent extensive restoration at the Treloar Technology Centre. In 2008, D.5390/17 returned to public display at the AWM's ANZAC Hall in Canberra.

Cole Palen built a flying replica for his Old Rhinebeck Aerodrome (in Bavarian ace Hans Böhning's colour scheme for its rear fuselage.) (Note: In 2013 the Albatros entered the shop for restoration, where the decision was made to change the livery for the first time. The aircraft was repainted in the brilliant colours of the D.V/D.Va flown by Lt. Hans Böhning of Jagdstaffel 36/Jagdstaffel 76 and returned to the air in May 2014.) A Ranger-powered replica, built in Canada, now flies with the New Zealand Warbirds Association at Ardmore, Auckland. A number of authentically constructed airworthy Albatros D.Va reproductions have been built in New Zealand with original and new-build engines. One example is on display at the Royal Air Force Museum in Colindale, London, another is owned by Kermit Weeks in Florida, USA, while two others remain flying with TVAL in NZ. A reproduction Albatros D.Va is on display at the San Diego Air and Space Museum. It has a rare 212 hp (158 kW) Hall-Scott L-6 engine of 1917, which was based on the original 160–180 hp (120–130 kW) Mercedes.

== Operators ==
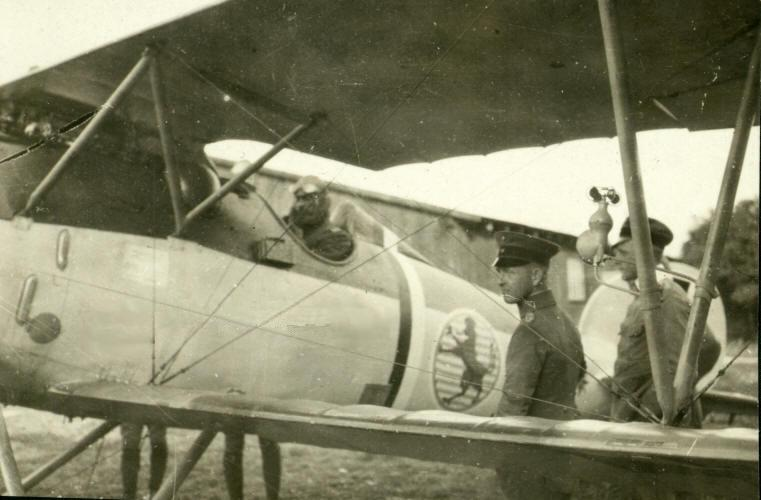
Eduard Ritter von Schleich in his D.V (serial D.2034/17)

German Empire

- Luftstreitkräfte
- Kaiserliche Marine

Poland

- Polish Air Force (postwar)

Ottoman Empire

- Ottoman Air Force

== Specifications (D.V) ==
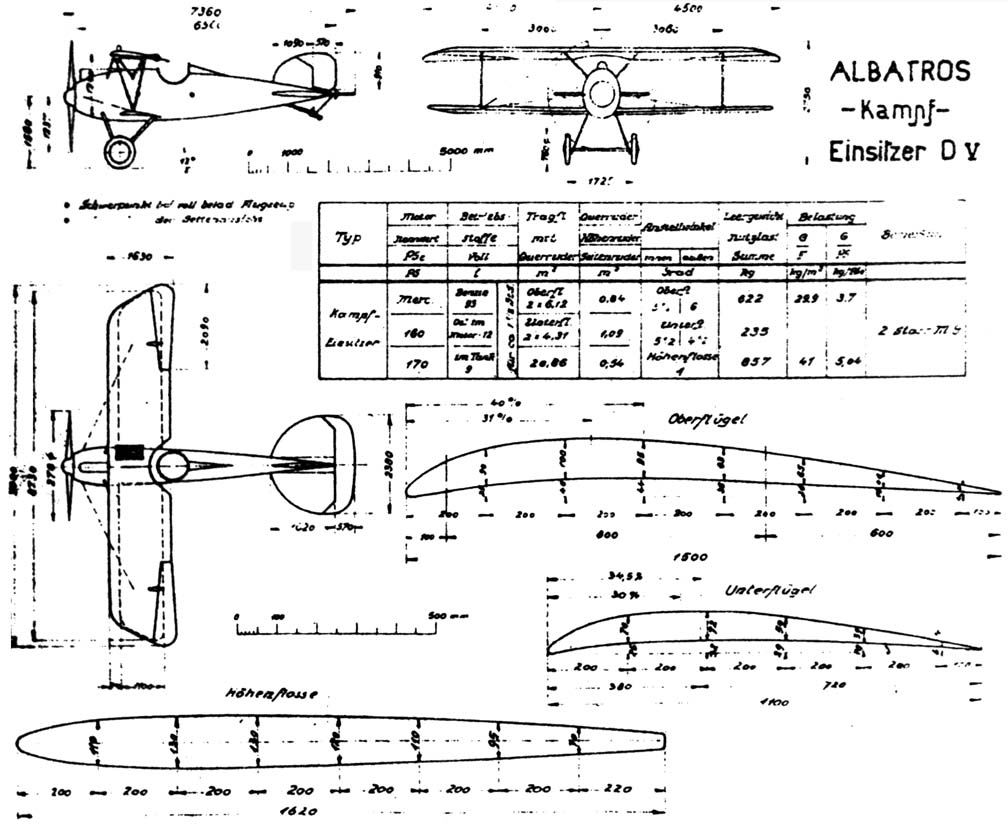
Official Albatros D.V Baubeschreibung drawing, submitted to IdFlieg

Data from German Aircraft of the First World War

General characteristics

- Crew: 1
- Length: 7.33 m (24 ft 1 in)
- Wingspan: 9.05 m (29 ft 8 in)
- Height: 2.7 m (8 ft 10 in)
- Wing area: 21.2 m^{2} (228 sq ft)
- Empty weight: 687 kg (1,515 lb)
- Gross weight: 937 kg (2,066 lb)
- Powerplant: 1 × Mercedes D.IIIaü piston engine, 150 kW (200 hp)
- Propellers: 2-bladed wooden propeller

Performance

- Maximum speed: 186 km/h (116 mph, 100 kn)
- Endurance: 350 km
- Service ceiling: 5,700 m (18,700 ft)
- Rate of climb: 4.17 m/s (800 ft/min)
- Time to altitude: 1,000 m (3,300 ft) in four minutes

Armament

- Guns: 2 × 7.92 mm (0.312 in) LMG 08/15 machine guns

== See also ==
Related lists

- List of military aircraft of Germany
- List of fighter aircraft
