= Mercedes D.III =

1914 aircraft engine by Daimler

D.III
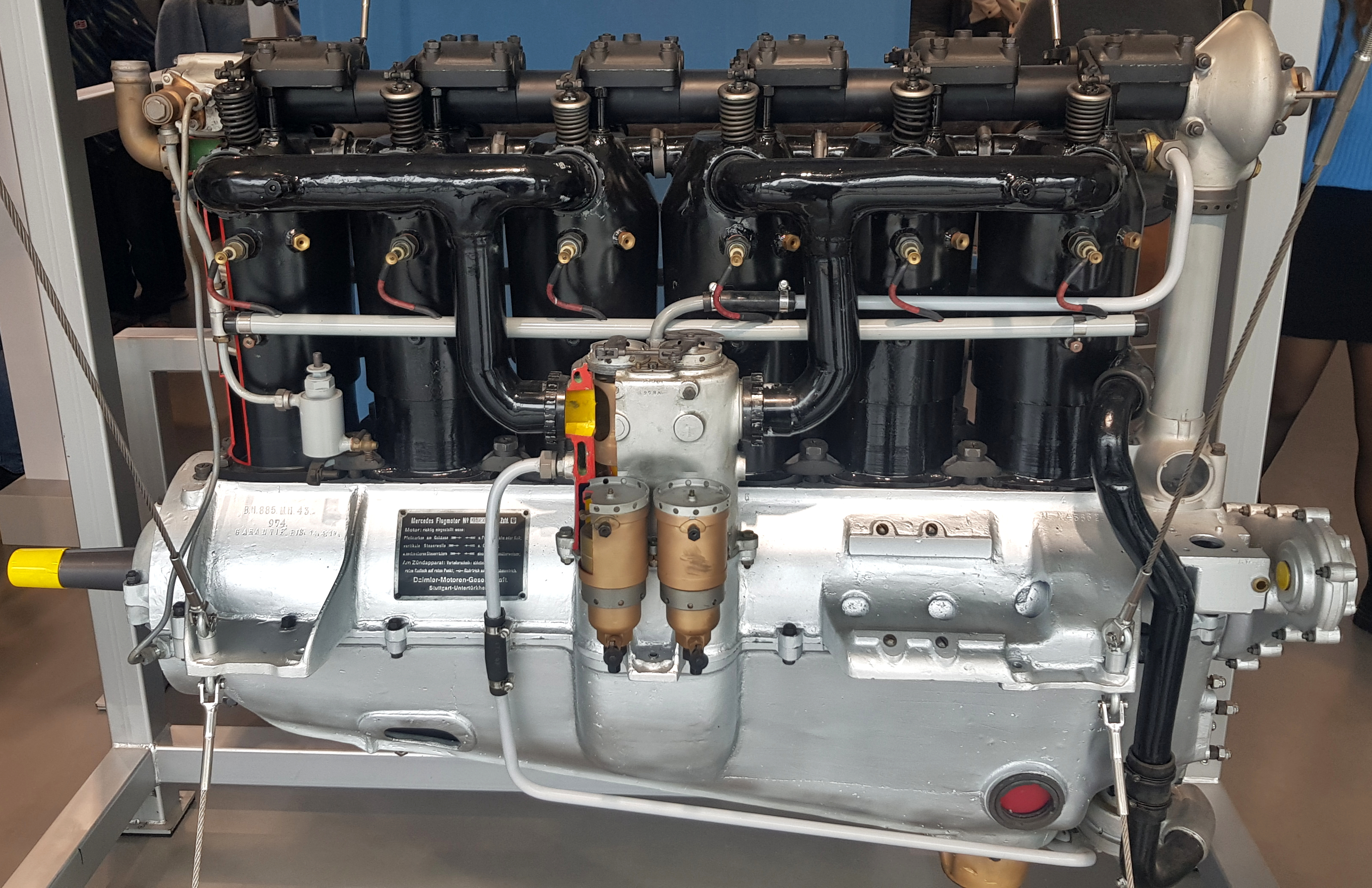
- DIIIa engine on display at the MTU Aero Engines museum, Munich
- Type: Inline piston engine
- National origin: Germany
- Manufacturer: Mercedes
- First run: 1914
- Developed from: Mercedes D.II
- Developed into: Mercedes D.IV Mercedes D.VI

The Mercedes D.III, or F1466 as it was known internally, was a six-cylinder SOHC valvetrain liquid-cooled inline aircraft engine built by Daimler and used on a wide variety of German aircraft during World War I. The initial versions were introduced in 1914 at 160 PS (118 kW), but a series of changes improved this to 170 PS (125 kW) in 1917, and 180 PS (132 kW) by mid-1918. These later models were used on almost all late-war German fighters, and its only real competition, the BMW III, was available only in very limited numbers. Compared to the Allied engines it faced, the D.III was generally outdated.

== Design and development ==
The D.III was based on the same pattern as the earlier Mercedes D.II, suitably scaled up for higher power settings. Like most inlines of the era, it used a large aluminium crankcase as the main structural component, with separate cylinders made from steel bolted onto it. The technology for screwing a threaded cylinder of steel into an aluminium crankcase did not exist at that time. Jackets for cooling water covered the top 2/3 of the cylinder, feeding a radiator via connections at the back of the engine. The only obvious design change from the earlier D.II was to use separate cooling jackets for each cylinder, whereas the D.II used one jacket each for a trio of adjacent pairs of cylinders.

The D.III featured a rather prominent overhead cam operating the single intake and exhaust valves, powered by a shaft running up from the crankshaft at the rear of the engine. Ignition was provided by two sets of spark plugs, one located on either side of the cylinders, each powered by a separate magneto for redundancy. The ignition cables were protected in tubes running down either side of the cylinders. Fuel was fed into the cylinders via pipes on the left side of the engine, supplied from a twin-barrel carburetor located just above the crankcase. Both the fuel and oil reservoirs were pressurized by an air compressor run off the crank.

Daimler also used the pistons of the D.III to produce the reduction geared, eight-cylinder 220 PS (162 kW) Mercedes D.IV during this period, but it did not see widespread use. The lengthened crankshaft of the D.IV proved prone to breaking.

== Production variants ==
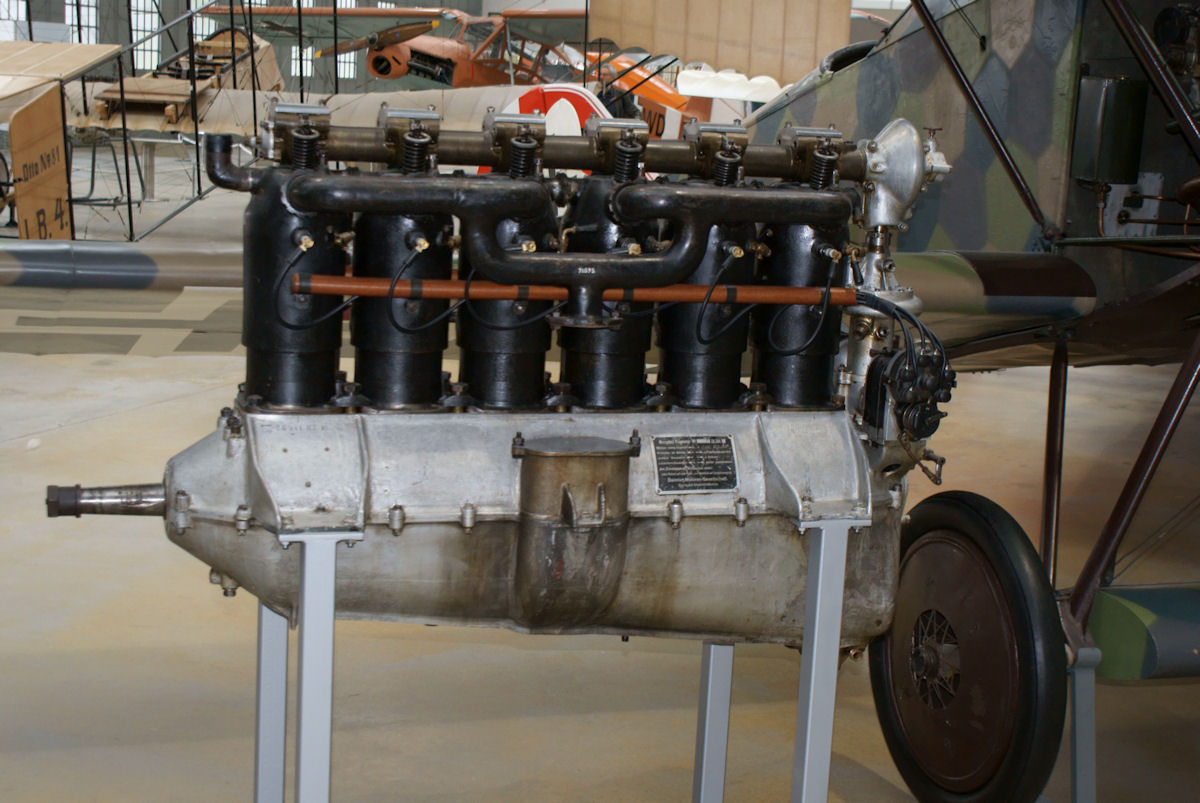
Original 160 PS (118 kW) Mercedes D.III, with "side-slot" rocker-arm design SOHC valvetrain atop the cylinders.

The original D.III was introduced in 1914. While it saw widespread use in early examples of the C-series of two-seat general-purpose biplanes, the D.III was too large for contemporary fighter designs and did not see use in that role. At the time, fighters were generally powered by lighter rotary engines of power output from 60 kW (80 hp) to about 82 kW (110 hp), or by water-cooled inline engines in the 75 kW (100 hp) to 89 kW (120 hp) range like the earlier Mercedes D.II. By 1916 new designs had grown in size and performance and the D.III became popular on new designs. By 1917 the D.III was being widely used in fighters, most notably on the famous Albatros D.I. Production of this version was essentially wound down by May 1917, with only a handful continuing to be delivered until October. British HP ratings being slightly different (with 746 watts = 1 hp) to the German PS or Pferdestärke standard of roughly 735 watts per PS horsepower, it is probable that this engine would have had a slightly lower rating under British HP numbers. Fuel consumption was 53.4 L; 14.11 US gal (11.75 imp gal) per hour. Its compression ratio was 4.5:1.

Development of the basic design led to the slightly modified 170 PS (125 kW) D.IIIa, which took over on the production lines in June 1917. The main change was to change the piston profile to have a flat head instead of the former concave one, thereby slightly increasing maximum compression to 4.64:1. Other changes were mainly in design details, notably a redesigned crankcase and new carburetor. Many of the accessories were also redesigned or moved around on the engine. This model was produced only briefly, for use on the Albatros D.III but there are indications that possibly some early Albatros (Alb.) made Fokker D.VII's were also equipped but probably had the engines upgraded or replaced as quickly as possible. This engine has been referred to in postwar British analysis as generating 180 hp (134 kW; 182 PS).

A more "radical" upgrade was the 180–200 PS (132–147 kW) D.IIIaü, introduced in late 1917, the D.IIIaü was a standardized refinement of the D.III and D.IIIa design and the ü designation was never official. This engine changed the pistons again, this time to a domed profile that further increased the maximum compression – the ü was for "über", meaning "overcompressed". Additionally, a new altitude-compensating carburetor was added, which improved performance at higher altitudes. To support operations at these altitudes, water from the radiator was used to heat the air intake and prevent icing in the carburetor. The aü model, which included upgraded D.III and D.IIIa engine blocks, was the most prolific German fighter engine of 1918 and designed into most fighter designs from late 1917 on. This included most of the entries in the First Fighter Competition at Adlershof in January 1918, notably the famed Fokker D.VII. In British post war evaluation the D.IIIaü demonstrated 200 hp (149 kW; 203 PS) according to the British standards.

A final version attempting to keep the D.III block competitive was the 200 PS (147 kW) D.IIIav (or avü), introduced mid-October 1918. The av used slightly longer pistons made of aluminium (possibly a first for a production engine), increasing the compression yet again, while at the same time allowing them to move faster due to the reduced weight. The maximum allowable engine speed increased from 1,400 in the earlier models to 1,600 in the av, accounting for most of the power gain. It is unclear if any av's saw service use. The increased use of Benzol in German aviation fuel may have helped this final upgrade of power, its higher octane rating being better suited to the higher compression ratio.

=== External differences between models ===
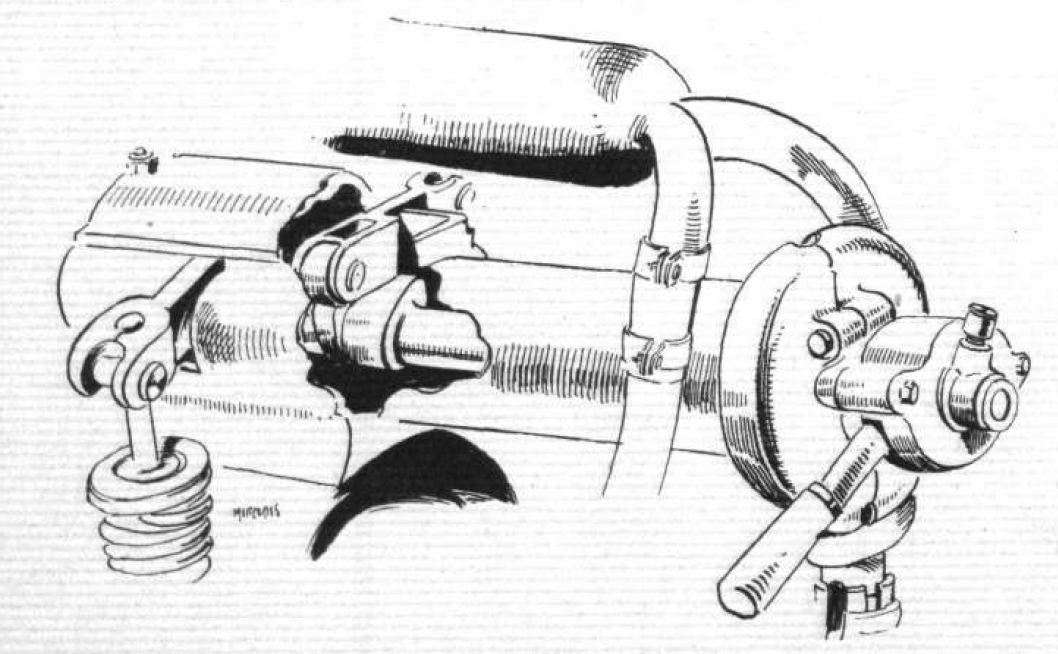
Aft-end details of the original SOHC valvetrain for the D.III - the rocker arm emerges from the "rocker box" through a slot in the box's side.

All of the D.III series were generally very similar to other models, with the exception of the piston profile, carburetor details and valvetrain details. It appears that upgrades were available for many of the engines, certainly for the III to IIIa, and IIIa to IIIaü. It would seem unlikely that early III's would ever make it to the IIIaü standard, as they would almost certainly have been worn out in service before then.

The valvetrain changes concerned the layout of the rocker arms that operated the valves. Early models had square rocker boxes positioned directly over the cylinders with the rocker arms exiting through vertical slots, one cut into each of the opposing sides of the boxes, as shown at left. The earlier "side-slot" rocker arm design had also been used for the Mercedes D.I and D.II engines' valvetrains. In later versions of the D.III engines, the boxes were relocated rearward on the tubular camshaft housing, and the now easily sealable cylindrical rocker arm shafts protruded forwards through the front surfaces of the boxes, operating the now fully exposed rocker arms with the exposed shaft ends, as shown at right.

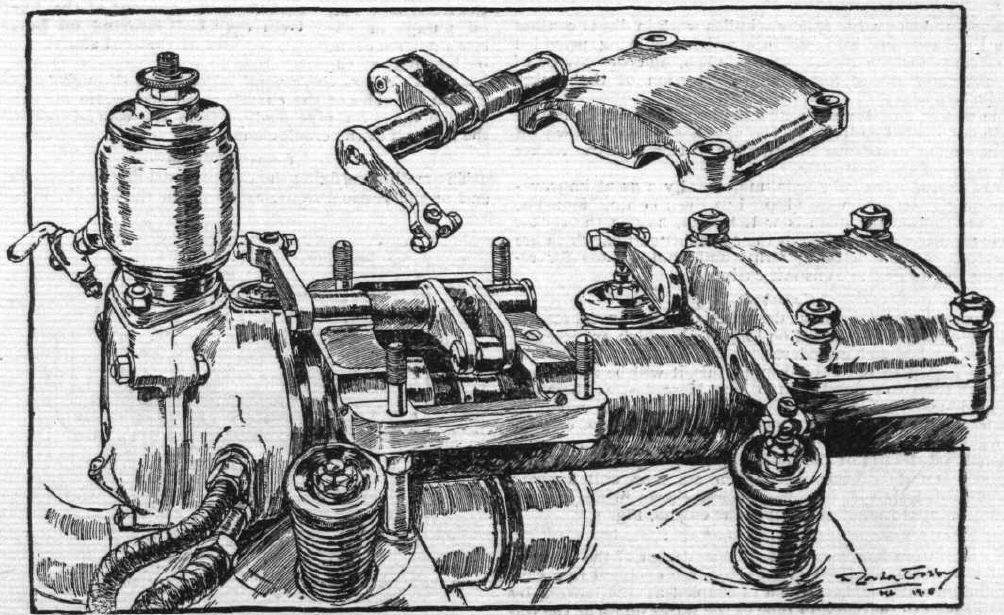
Later pattern SOHC D.III valvetrain, using the relocated rocker box design, with rotary shafts to operate the fully exposed roller rocker arms.

The newer arrangement was stated as being interchangeable as a set with the complete camshaft, rocker boxes, rocker arms and valve springs, with the D.III's earlier "side-slot" cam drive system design - the later system seems to have influenced both Packard's and Hall-Scott's engine designers to adopt a nearly identical "slotless" rocker-box overhead cam valvetrain design feature for the Liberty L-12 Allied V-12 aviation engine.

Confusingly, the "ü" was not an official part of the name. This leads to a number of problems in various references, which often confuse the IIIa with the IIIaü, listing the former as a 130 kW (180 hp) engine. There are two D.IV engines — from the IdFlieg aircraft powerplant class designations based on power output — one the straight-eight based on the 140 mm bore D.III pistons; and the later, six-cylinder Mercedes D.IVa with 160 mm bore cylinders, which was essentially unrelated.

The D.III line of engines would find themselves eclipsed in performance by the BMW IIIa of 185 PS (136 kW) and then 200 PS (147 kW) (British rated it at 230 hp (172 kW; 233 PS)) in 1918, however, the small number of BMW's produced ensured that the Mercedes D.III series would be the primary German fighter engine up to the last month or two of the war and it would still be seen in very large numbers even at the end. At the end of the war the D.IIIaü would still be the numerically predominant German fighter engine. As a result, the Fokker D.VII's (those not equipped with BMW IIIa's) and the Pfalz D.XII's would be engine-limited in performance (as opposed to "airframe-limited") and yet would still be formidable adversaries to their Allied counterparts. The D.IIIaü was considered the optimum engine for the Roland D.VI, Pfalz D.IIIa, and Albatros D.Va fighters, whose airframes were of an earlier, "all-wood" generation in design.

== Variants ==
Mercedes F1466
Company designation for the D.III
D.III
The original production version directly developed from the Mercedes D.II developing 150–160 PS (110–118 kW)
D.IIIa
An up-graded D.III introduced in 1917 rated at 170 PS (125 kW)
D.IIIaü
An unofficial designation, (ü for über), for D.IIIa engines with domed pistons, operating "over-compressed", (at a higher compression ratio). These engines were not able to operate at full throttle at sea level, utilising a self compensating carburettor. 180–200 PS (132–147 kW)
D.IIIav
D.IIIa engines with the domed pistons made from Aluminium alloy giving the higher compression ratio as well as a higher operating rpm and thus more power. 200 PS (147 kW).
D.IIIavü
alternative unofficial designation for the D.IIIav

== Applications ==
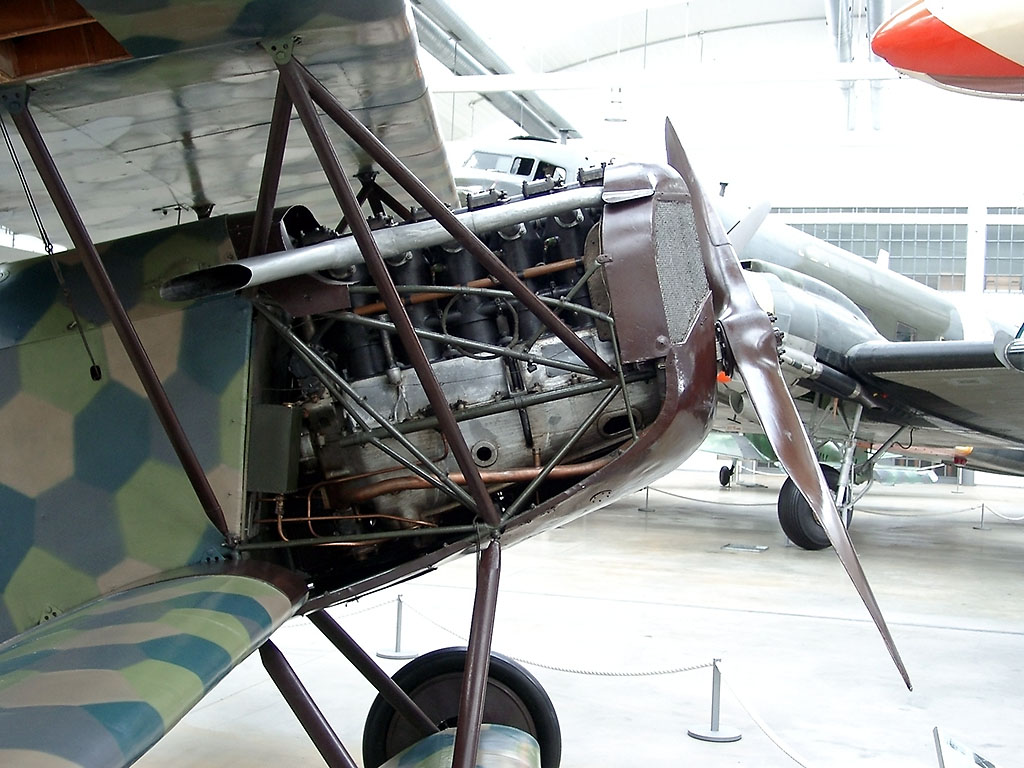
Mercedes D.IIIa mounted in a Fokker D.VII

- AEG C.IV
- AGO C.I
- Albatros C.I
- Albatros C.III
- Albatros C.XIII N
- Albatros D.II
- Albatros D.III
- Albatros D.V/D.Va
- Albatros L 57
- Albatros W.4
- Aviatik C.I
- Aviatik C.III
- Daimler L11
- Daimler L14
- Fokker D.IV
- Fokker D.VII
- Gotha G.I
- Halberstadt CL.II
- Halberstadt CL.IV
- Hannover CL.III
- Hansa-Brandenburg C.I Series 63
- Hansa-Brandenburg W.12
- Junkers CL.I
- Junkers D.I
- LFG Roland C.II
- LFG Roland D.II
- LFG Roland D.VI
- LFG Roland D.XV
- Rumpler C.I
- Rumpler 6B
- Pfalz D.III
- Pfalz D.XII
- Schütte-Lanz G.I
- Zeppelin-Staaken VGO.III
- Zeppelin-Staaken R.IV
- Germany's giant aircraft of World War I the Riesenflugzeug

== Specifications (D.IIIaü) ==
Data from Jane's All the World's Aircraft 1919.

=== General characteristics ===
- Type: 6-cyl. water-cooled in-line piston engine
- Bore: 140 mm (5.51 in)
- Stroke: 160 mm (6.30 in)
- Displacement: 14.78 L (901.93 cu in)
- Length: 1,650 mm (64.96 in)
- Width: 490 mm (19.29 in)
- Height: 1,072 mm (42.20 in)
- Dry weight: 310 kg (683 lb)

=== Components ===
- Valvetrain: SOHC rocker operated single inlet and exhaust valves.
- Fuel system: Dual Mercedes twin-jet carburettors
- Fuel type: Gasoline
- Oil system: Pressure system; multiple plunger pump
- Cooling system: Water-cooled

=== Performance ===
- Power output: 130 kW (174 hp) at 1,400 rpm (rated power at sea level), 152 kW (204 hp) at 1,600 rpm (maximum power at altitude)
- Specific power: (10.281 kW/L (0.2259 hp/cu in)
- Compression ratio: 4.64:1
- Specific fuel consumption: 412 mL/kWh (0.541 pt/hp/hour)
- Oil consumption: 27 mL/kW/hour (0.0355pt/hp/hour)
- Power-to-weight ratio: 0.492 kW/kg (0.299 hp/lb)
- BMEP: 752 kPa (109.1 psi)

== See also ==
Comparable engines

- Austro-Daimler 6
- BMW IIIa
- Hiero 6
- Liberty L-6
- SPA 6A

Related lists

- List of aircraft engines
