= LFG Roland D.XVI =

1910s German fighter aircraft

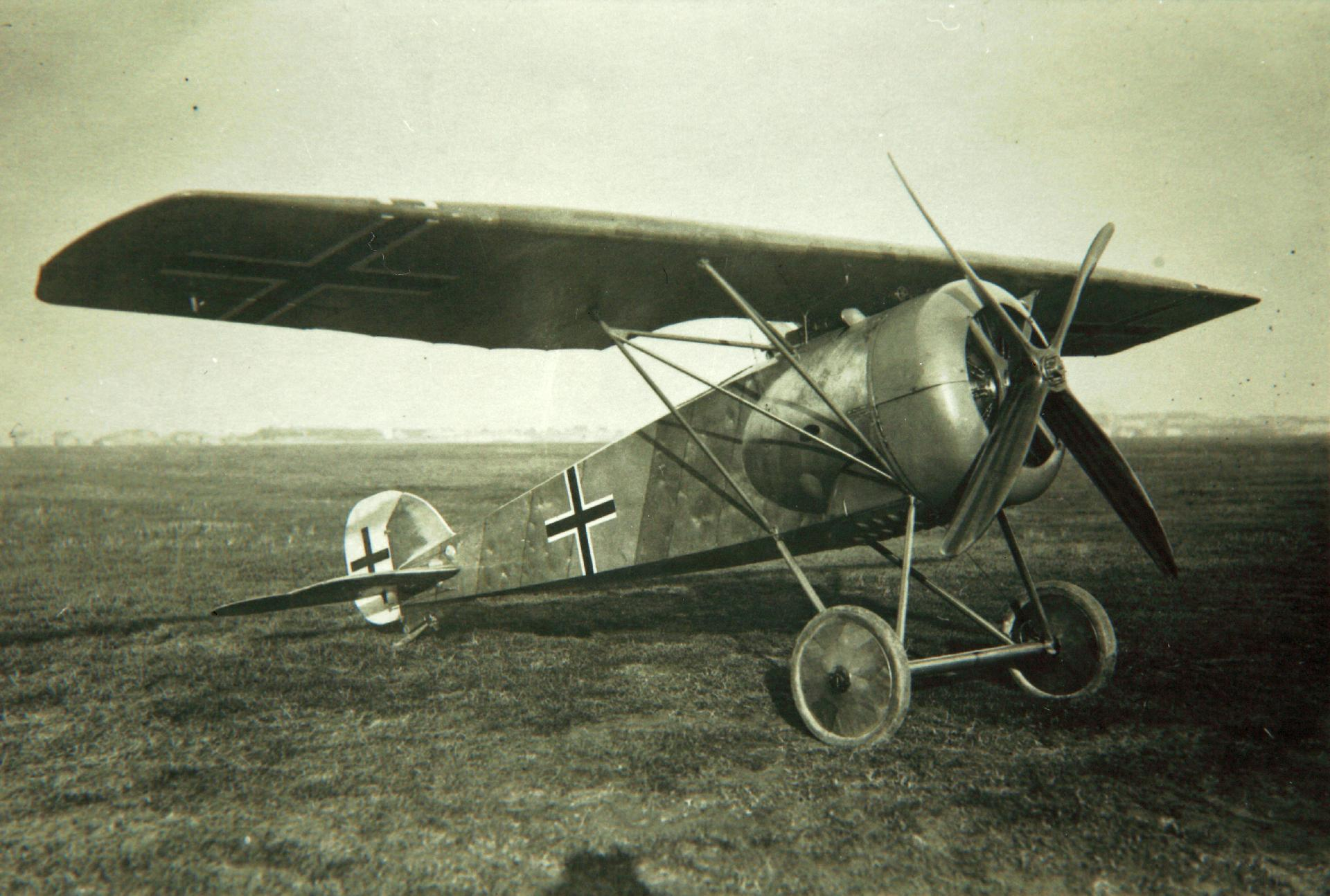
- LFG Roland D.XVI first prototype

General information
- Type: Single seat fighter aircraft
- National origin: Germany
- Manufacturer: LFG Roland (Luft-Fahrzeug-Gesellschaft)
- Number built: 2

History
- First flight: September–October 1918

The LFG Roland D.XVI, initially designated the LFG Roland E.I, was a single-seat, single-engine, parasol wing German fighter aircraft flown close to the end of World War I. Only two were built.

== Design and development ==
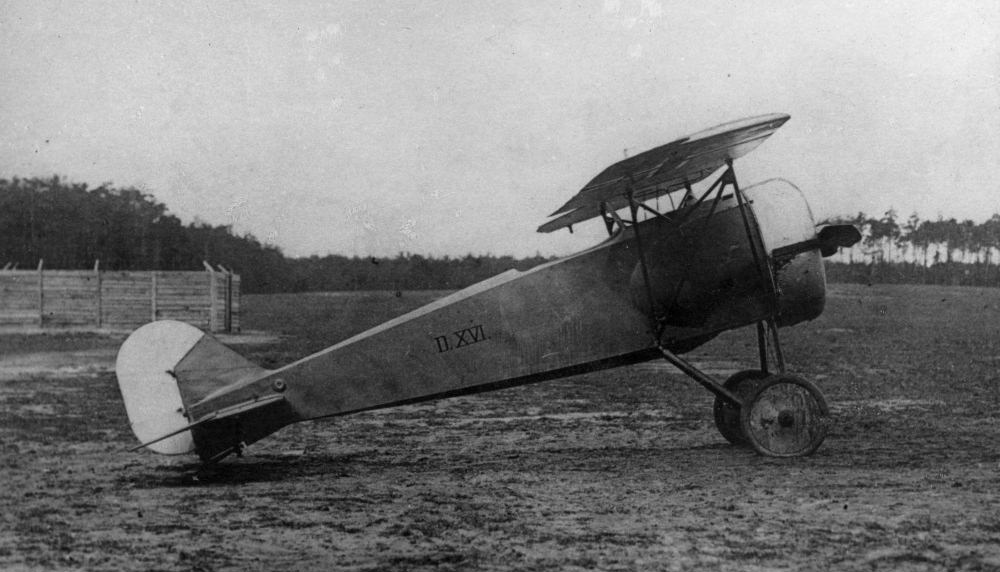
LFG Roland D.XVI second prototype

The D.XVI had a fully cantilevered fabric covered parasol wing mounted above the fuselage on a pair of N-form struts from the lower fuselage. These struts were laterally stabilized with a near horizontal strut on each side, joining the upper fuselage and the upper end of the rear member of the N. In plan the wing was straight tapered with blunt tips and included a trailing edge cut-out to improve upward vision from the cockpit. The wing was quite thick and the ailerons short.

Its fuselage was flat-sided and rectangular in cross-section, with plywood covering. The prototypes differed in the way this covering was applied; on one the grain ran diagonally, on the other longitudinally. They also differed in their vertical tails, one broader and lower than the other. Both had deep horn balanced rudders which extended to the keel. The horizontal tail was mounted at mid-fuselage, with a straight-edged, unswept tailplane bearing overhung, balanced elevators with outward increasing chord. Both prototypes had conventional undercarriages with a rigid axle mounted to the lower fuselage by V-form struts. (Note: Green and Swanborough and Gray and Thetford disagree about the order of the prototypes, the latter placing the Siemens engined version first.)

The main difference between the two prototypes was in the engines, both fully cowled rotaries. One had a 9-cylinder, 160 hp (119 kW) Goebel Goe.III, the other an 11-cylinder Siemens-Halske Sh.III of about the same power. Both two and four blade propellers were used.

The Idflieg allowed the Sh.III engined version to take part in the third D-type competition for fighters even though that engine was not on its approved list. It was faster than either the Fokker D.VII or the Siemens-Schuckert D.IV below 4,000 m (13,123 ft) but slower at higher altitude.

== Specifications (Siemens-Halske engine) ==
Data from Green & Swanborough p.339-40

General characteristics

- Crew: One
- Length: 5.90 m (19 ft 4 in)
- Wingspan: 9.46 m (31 ft 0 in)
- Powerplant: 1 × Siemens-Halske Sh.III geared rotary, 120 kW (160 hp)
- Propellers: 4-bladed

Armament

- Guns: 2 × synchronised 7.9 mm (0.31 in) LMG 08/15 (Spandau) machine guns

== See also ==
- LFG Roland D.XVII
- Fokker D.VIII
- Kondor E 3
- Siemens-Schuckert D.VI
- Rumpler D.I
- Zeppelin-Lindau D.I
