= LFG Roland D.XV =

1910s German fighter aircraft

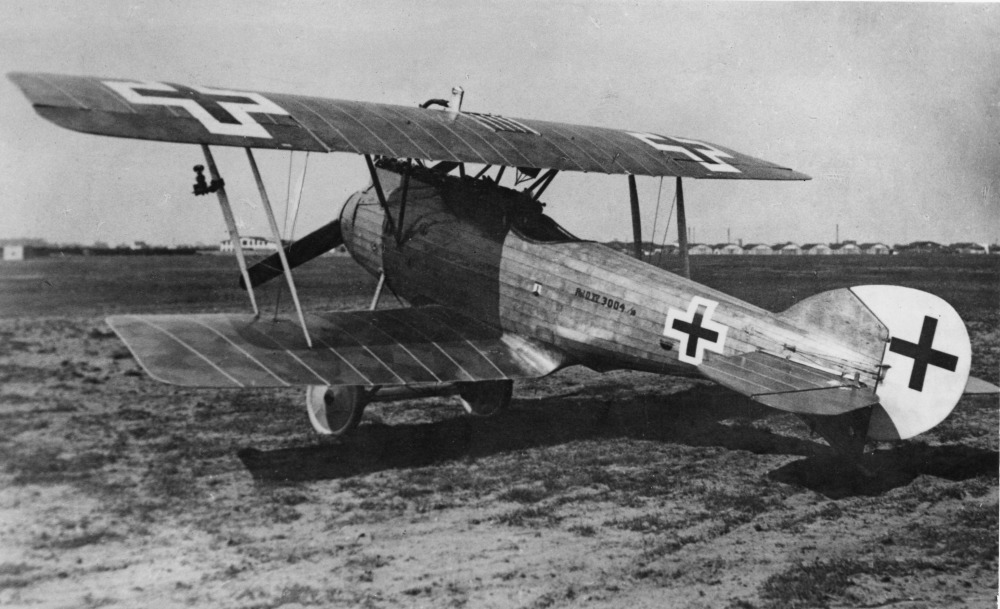
- LFG Roland D.XV prototype

General information
- Type: Single seat fighter aircraft
- National origin: Germany
- Manufacturer: LFG Roland (Luft-Fahrzeug-Gesellschaft)
- Number built: 4 (2 of each different types of this designation)

History
- First flight: April–May 1918

The LFG Roland D.XV was a World War I German single-seat fighter aircraft ordered as a test bed for engine comparisons. It was distinguished from earlier Roland biplane designs by the elimination of flying wires. Two later aircraft, also called LFG Roland D.XV, were completely different designs with slab-sided fuselages.

== Design and development ==
=== The first D.XV version ===
The D.XV was the last LFG design to use the Klinkerrumpfe (clinker built fuselage) structure, which produced a round cross-section fuselage with thin, overlapping, longitudinal spruce strips supported by a light wooden frame, used on a succession of fighter types beginning with the D.IV. Its wings had constant chord and blunt tips, mounted with more stagger than on their earlier designs. The D.XV was a cantilevered single bay biplane with a lower wing of shorter span than the upper, so the interplane struts leaned outwards. There were no bracing wires. The second prototype differed in having a broader chord, slightly greater span upper wing, and narrower chord lower planes. The larger upper wing had a trailing edge cut-out to enhance vision from the cockpit, a feature absent from the first aircraft. A single I interplane strut on each side, broadly faired into the wings at the top and bottom, replaced the earlier pairs. Only the upper wings carried ailerons. Both had a flush-mounted radiator similar to those used in the Albatros D.V fighters mounted within the upper wing ahead of the pilot.

Initially, both prototypes of the D.XV were powered by 160 hp (119 kW) Mercedes D.IIIa six-cylinder in-line engines, mounted with the tops of the cylinders just exposed. This unit was later exchanged on the second prototype for a 185 hp (138 kW) BMW IIIa on the same type, mounted within a more circular cross-section, slender nose but with more of the cylinders visible. At the rear, the tailplane was mounted at mid-fuselage. The vertical tail was ovoid, with a broad, balanced rudder that extended down to a sizeable ventral fin, which also carried a tailskid. The main fixed, conventional undercarriage had wheels on a single axle, mounted to the fuselage by V-struts.

The prototype flew before the end of April 1918 but returned to the factory for modifications the following month. The second flew that June. In September, the Idflieg, initially requesting three D.XVs, called for further alterations in response to their flight testing. The company responded with two examples of a completely different design, which retained the D.XV designation. (Note: Some authors, e.g. Green and Swanborough p.339 refer to D.XV (I) and D.XV (II) or D.XV/I and D.XV/II but Gray and Thetford p.viii warn that "Such 'designations' are in danger of being accepted, quite mistakenly, as being official.")

=== The redesigned D.XV ===
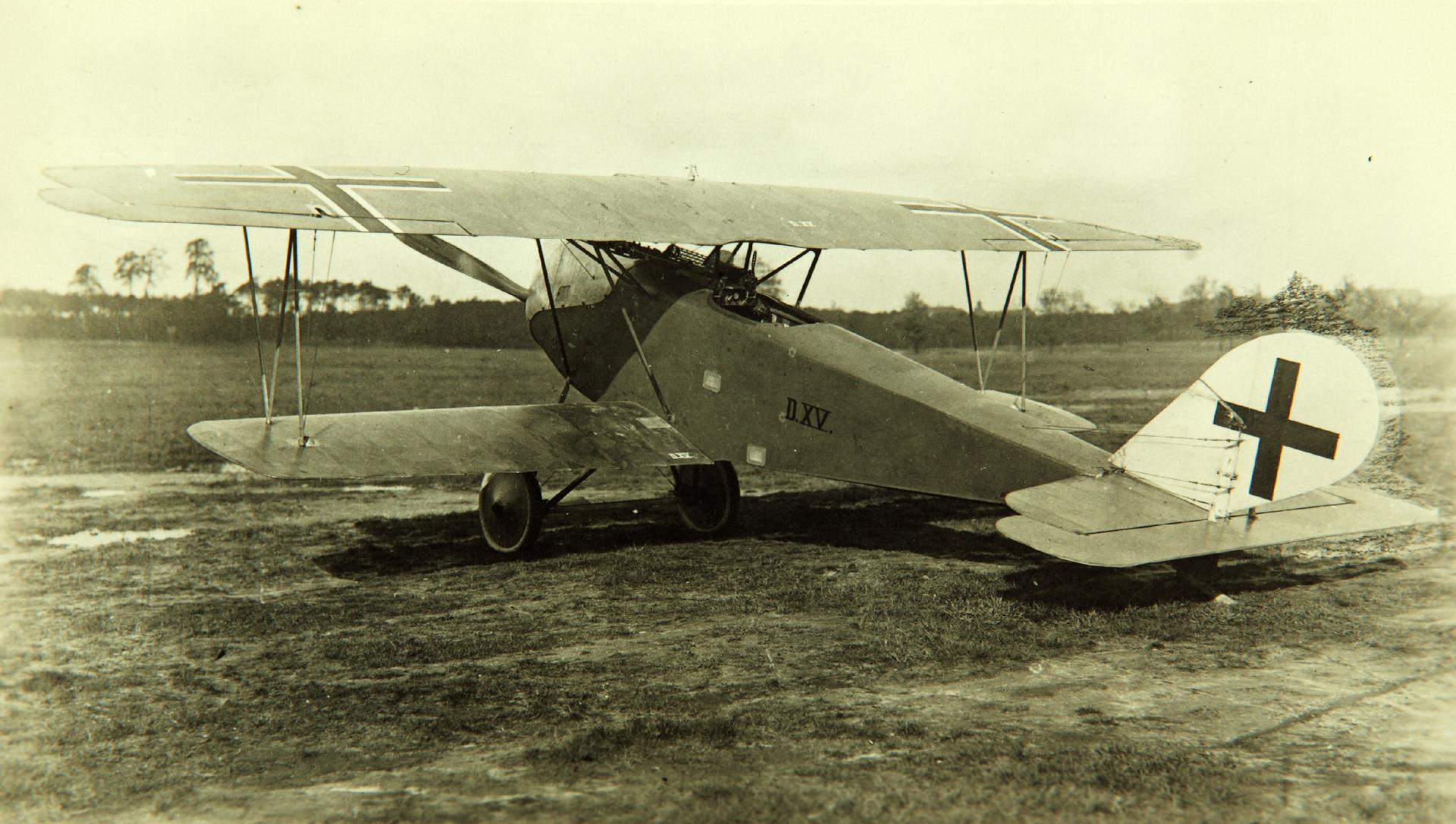
LFG Roland D.XV third prototype

The third prototype of the D.XV had a completely different fuselage and empennage, which dispensed with the molded wooden shell of previous Roland aircraft and used a more conventional fabric over-frame construction typical of the period. However, it tapered to a horizontal knife edge that doubled as the hinge for the single-piece overhung elevator. It was an unequal span, single-bay biplane with constant chord unswept wings separated by N-form interplane struts. The wing cellule was also redesigned compared to the earlier D.XVs. A radiator extended out from the leading edge of the top wing. The cabane structure was built of four tubular steel vees, angling out from the fuselage to connect upper and lower longerons to the upper wing spars. Overhung ailerons were used on the upper wing only. The fin carried a rounded, balanced rudder smoothly profiled with it, which bottomed well above the elevator. The undercarriage was similar to that of the first D.XVs.

The third D.XV first flew in late October 1918 powered by a 185 hp (138 kW) BMW IIIa and the similarly designed fourth flew slightly later with a 200 hp (149 kW) version of that engine. Apart from the engines, the two aircraft differed only in the sheet metal shape around the cowling. The development of these aircraft ended with the Armistice in November 1918.

== Specifications (first prototype) ==
Data from Green & Swanborough p.339

General characteristics

- Crew: One
- Wingspan: 8.64 m (28 ft 4 in)
- Wing area: 23.80 m^{2} (256.2 sq ft)
- Empty weight: 730 kg (1,609 lb)
- Gross weight: 910 kg (2,006 lb)
- Powerplant: 1 × Mercedes D.IIIa 6 cylinder water-cooled in-line piston engine, 120 kW (160 hp)
- Propellers: 2-bladed

Armament

- Guns: 2 × synchronised 7.9 mm (0.31 in) LMG 08/15 (Spandau) machine guns

== See also ==
- LFG Roland D.XVII
- Fokker D.VIII
- Siemens-Schuckert D.VI
- Rumpler D.I
- Zeppelin-Lindau D.I

== Bibliography ==
- Herris, Jack (2014). Roland Aircraft of WWI: A Centennial Perspective on Great War Airplanes. Great War Aviation Centennial Series. Vol. 9. Aeronaut Books. ISBN 978-1-935881-20-9.
