= LFG Roland D.XVII =

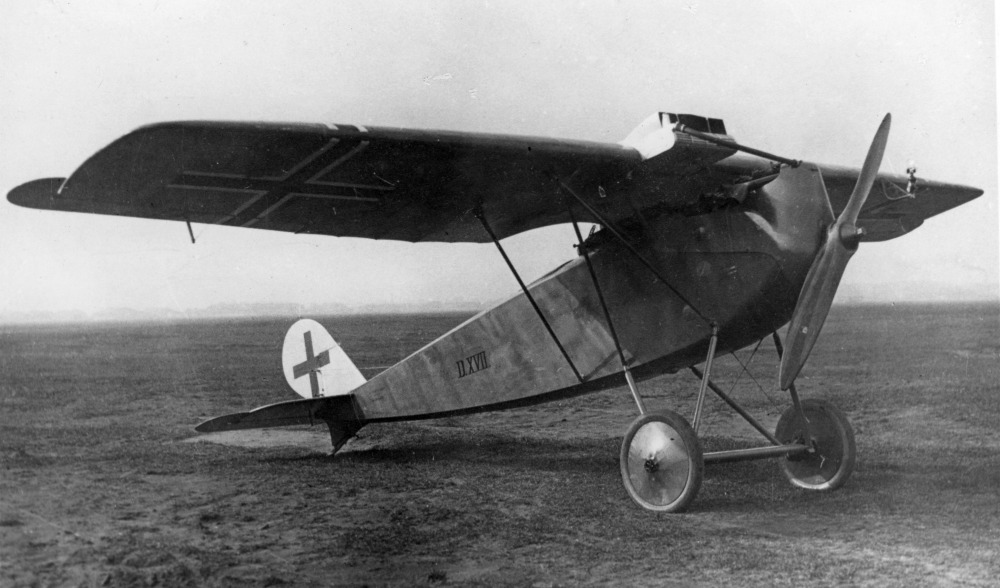

General information
- Type: Single-seat fighter aircraft
- National origin: Germany
- Manufacturer: LFG Roland (Luft-Fahrzeug-Gesellschaft)
- Number built: 1

History
- First flight: October 1918

The LFG Roland D.XVII was a single-seat, single-engine, parasol wing German fighter aircraft flown close to the end of World War I. Only one was built.

== Design and development ==
The D.XVII was the last of LFG's line of single-seat fighters. It combined features of their previous two models, the D.XV and D.XVI: it had the engine and fuselage of the third D.XV but was a parasol wing aircraft like the D.XVI.

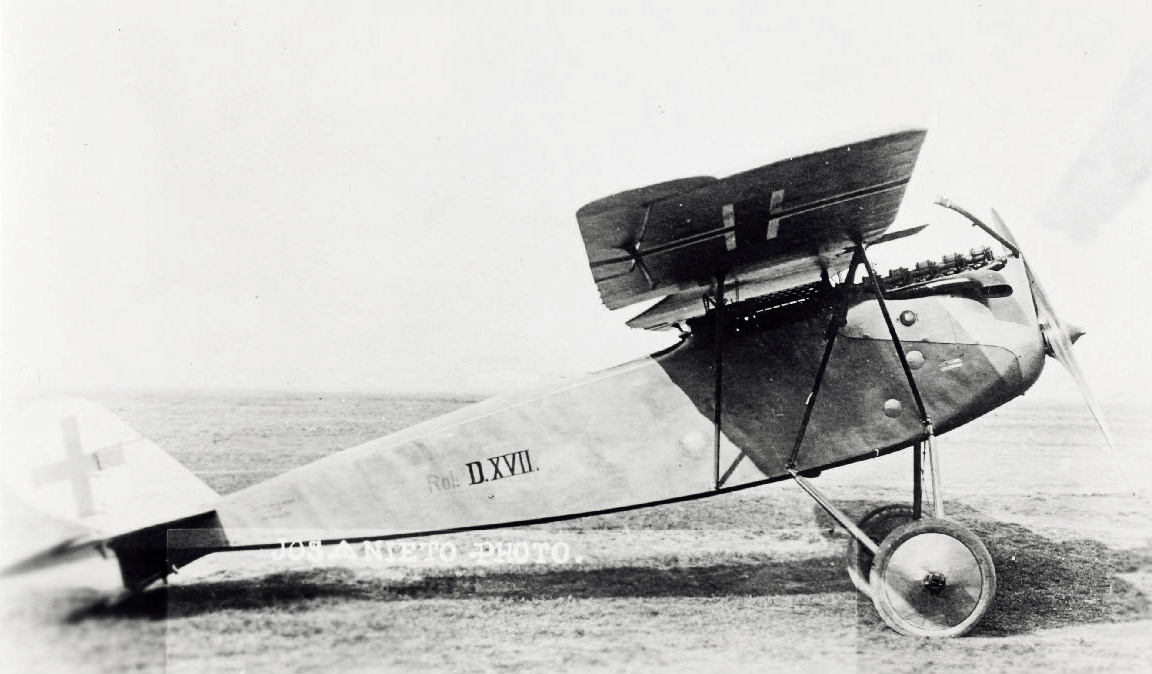
LFG Roland D.XVII side

Despite the common configuration the wings of the D.XVI and D.XVII were different. The D.XVIIs wings had constant chord and overhung ailerons. It was mounted over the fuselage on each side with an inverted V-form strut pair from the leading edge to the lower fuselage longeron and a second strut from the rear wing spar to the same longeron further aft. The structure was stabilized laterally with a further outward leaning strut between top of the forward V-strut and the upper fuselage.

The D.XVII shared the flat-sided, tapered fuselage of the third D.XV, a tailplane mounted to the rear horizontal knife edge, a small fin and an almost semicircular rudder which was entirely above the tailplane. The D.XVII was powered by a 138 kW (185 hp) BMW IIIa six cylinder, water-cooled inline engine driving a two-bladed propeller. The fixed conventional undercarriage was standard for the time, with a rigid axle mounted to V-struts attached to the lower fuselage longerons, plus a tailskid faired into a small ventral fin.

The D.XVII was rolled out on 18 October 1918 in time for the third D-type competition held at Adlershof that month but was judged inferior to the Fokker V 29, another parasol wing, BMW III powered design. The Roland's wing oscillated in turns and stalled without warning at low speeds.

== Specifications ==
Data from Green & Swanborough p.340

General characteristics

- Crew: One
- Powerplant: 1 × BMW IIIa 6-cylinder water-cooled inline, 138 kW (185 hp)
- Propellers: 2-bladed

Armament

- Guns: 2 × synchronised 7.9 mm (0.31 in) LMG 08/15 (Spandau) machine guns

== See also ==
- LFG Roland D.XVI
- Fokker D.VIII
- Siemens-Schuckert D.VI
- Rumpler D.I
- Zeppelin-Lindau D.I
