= Siemens-Schuckert D.VI =

D.VI
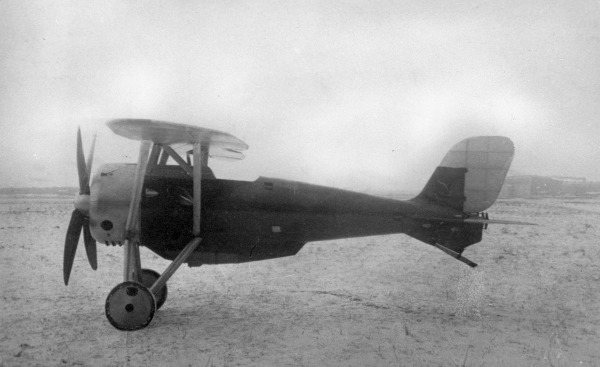

General information
- Type: Single seat fighter aircraft
- National origin: Germany
- Manufacturer: Siemens-Schuckert
- Number built: 2

History
- First flight: early 1919

The Siemens-Schuckert D.VI was a single engine, single seat, parasol wing German fighter aircraft flown in 1919.

== Design and development ==
The Idflieg ordered three prototypes of the parasol winged E.IV in April 1918. Renamed D.VI in September, two were completed early in 1919, after the Armistice with Germany.

In plan the wing of the D.VI was more complicated than most, with the chord narrowest in the centre section, increasing outwards then decreasing somewhat towards the wing tips from about mid-span. Most of the curvature was on the trailing edge, assisting the pilot's vision from his cockpit there. The wing thickness also varied along the span, thinnest in the centre then increasing and decreasing again. The wing carried overhung, balanced ailerons and was braced with a pair of slightly converging, outward leaning struts to the thickest part of the wing from the lower fuselage. Its centre section was supported by a pair of short, vertical N-form cabane struts from the upper fuselage.

The fuselage of the D.VI was circular in cross-section, with its 11-cylinder, 160 hp (119 kW) Siemens-Halske Sh.IIIa rotary engine completely cowled in the nose driving a four blade propeller. The fuselage diameter decreased markedly to the tail but an unusual jettisonable fuel tank bulged out below for about 35% of the overall length. The blunt delta shaped tailplane was mounted at mid-fuselage height and had a single balanced elevator. The fin was small, with a generous, balanced, swept back, blunt topped rudder. The fighter had a simple, fixed conventional undercarriage, with mainwheels on a single axle supported by wire braced V-struts to the lower fuselage. Its tall tailskid was faired aft forming a little ventral fin.

The D.VI was test flown between February and May 1919 with promising speed and climb rates, though one of the two prototypes was lost. The other was reputedly destroyed by the Siemens-Schuckert staff to prevent its acquisition by the Aeronautical Inter-Allied Commission of Control, that began work in 1918.

== Specifications ==
Data from German Aircraft of the First World War

General characteristics

- Crew: One
- Length: 6.5 m (21 ft 4 in)
- Wingspan: 9.37 m (30 ft 9 in)
- Height: 2.72 m (8 ft 11 in)
- Wing area: 12.46 m^{2} (134.1 sq ft)
- Empty weight: 540 kg (1,190 lb)
- Gross weight: 710 kg (1,565 lb)
- Powerplant: 1 × Siemens-Halske Sh.IIIa 11-cylinder rotary, 120 kW (160 hp)
- Propellers: 4-bladed

Performance

- Maximum speed: 220 km/h (140 mph, 120 kn)
- Range: 350 km (220 mi, 190 nmi)
- Endurance: 2 hr
- Time to altitude: 16 min to 6,000 m (19,680 ft)

== See also ==
- Fokker D.VIII
- LFG Roland D.XVI
- Rumpler D.I
- Zeppelin-Lindau D.I
