= Pfalz D.VII =

D.VII
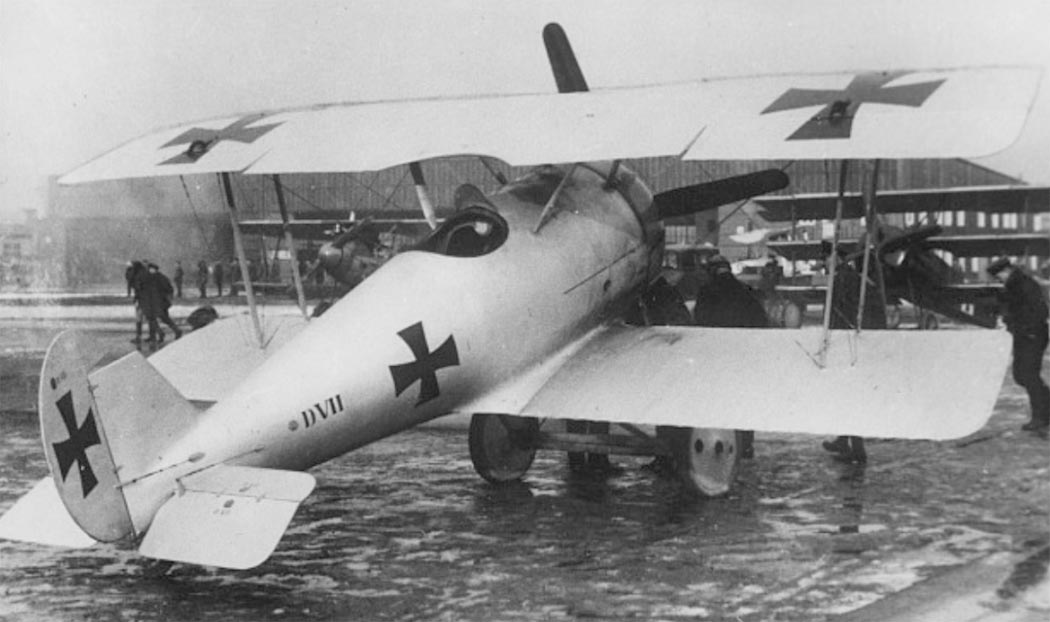

General information
- Type: Single seat fighter aircraft
- National origin: Germany
- Manufacturer: Pfalz Flugzeugwerke

History
- First flight: Late 1917

The Pfalz D.VII was a German biplane fighter aircraft from World War I. It was not put into production.

== Design and development ==
The D.VII was a single-bay biplane with staggered, parallel-chord wings. It had simple parallel interplane struts; the upper centre section was supported on each side by a three-sided rectangular frame, open at the bottom where it was mounted on the upper fuselage. There were externally connected ailerons on both upper and lower planes.

Behind the D.VII's rotary engine its fuselage was of rounded cross-section, with the single-seat, open cockpit just below the upper wing's trailing edge, where there was a small cut-out for better upward vision. The horizontal tail was mounted at mid-fuselage; the fin was straight-edged and carried a full, rounded and horn balanced rudder. The D.VII had a simple fixed conventional undercarriage, with mainwheels on a single axle supported at each end by a thin V-form pair of struts. There was a generous tailskid. The D.VII had a pair of fixed LMG 08/15 machine guns, the standard German single-seat fighter armament of the time.

Beginning its flying programme near the end of 1917, the Pfalz was fitted with three types of rotary engines in testing: the 108 kW (145 hp) Oberursel U.III, the Goebel Goe.III and the Siemens-Halske Sh.III, the last two both producing 119 kW (160 hp). These drove both two and four blade propellers. Both balanced and unbalanced ailerons were tried.

The D.VII was one of three Pfalz aircraft which competed at the first D-Type contest held at Adlershof in January and February 1918, the others being the D.VI and the D.VIII. It gained its Type Certificate in February 1918 but did not receive a production order.

== Specifications ==
Data from Green & Swanborough

General characteristics

- Crew: One
- Length: 5.65 m (18 ft 6 in)
- Wingspan: 7.52 m (24 ft 8 in)
- Height: 2.85 m (9 ft 4 in)
- Wing area: 17.20 m^{2} (185.1 sq ft)
- Empty weight: 520 kg (1,146 lb)
- Gross weight: 715 kg (1,576 lb)
- Powerplant: 1 × Siemens-Halske Sh.III 11-cylinder rotary engine, 120 kW (160 hp)
- Propellers: 2-bladed

Performance

- Maximum speed: 190 km/h (120 mph, 100 kn) at 4,000 m (13,215 ft)
- Endurance: 1.5 hr
- Time to altitude: 25.25 min to 6,000 m (18,290 ft)

Armament

- 2 × LMG 08/15 7.9 mm (0.311 in) machine guns
