= Pfalz D.VI =

D.VI
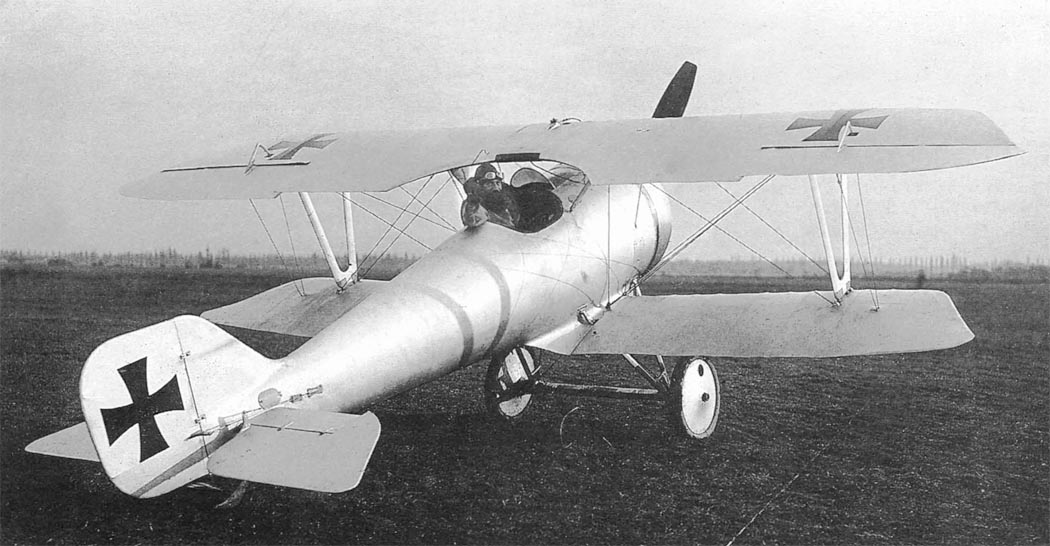

General information
- Type: Single seat fighter aircraft
- National origin: Germany
- Manufacturer: Pfalz Flugzeugwerke

History
- First flight: Early 1917

The Pfalz D.VI was a German sesquiplane fighter aircraft from World War I. It was not put into production.

== Design and development ==
The D.VI was a single bay sesquiplane with parallel chord wings which had angled tips The lower planes were smaller in span and chord than the upper ones but there was no stagger. The interplane struts were similar to those of the D.III, almost V-form but with a squared-off vertex and placed near the lower leading edge. The fuselage and wing centre section were joined by a pair of outward leaning cabane struts on each side. As on the D.III, the lower wing roots were carefully faired into the fuselage. There were ailerons only on the upper wings.

The Pfalz was fitted with a nine-cylinder 82 kW (110 hp) Oberursel U.II rotary engine, driving a two-blade propeller with a large spinner. The fuselage was nearly circular in cross section; smoothly covered with plywood, it tapered towards the tail. The straight edged tailplane was mounted at mid fuselage and carried horn balanced elevators with angled tips. A nearly triangular, flat-topped fin carried a D-shaped rudder, hinged at the elevator trailing edge. A single-seat, open cockpit placed the pilot under the upper trailing edge, which had a shallow but broad cut-out to enhance his view. The D.VI had a simple fixed conventional undercarriage, with mainwheels on a single axle supported at each end by a slender V-form pair of struts. There was a small tailskid. It was armed with a pair of fixed LMG 08/15 7.9 mm (0.31 in) calibre machine guns, the standard German single-seat fighter equipment of the time.

The D.VI was one of three Pfalz aircraft which competed at the first D-Type contest held at Adlershof in January and February 1918, the others being the D.VII and the D.VIII. It gained its Type Certificate in September 1918 but failed to win a production order.

== Specifications ==
Data from Green & Swanborough

General characteristics

- Crew: One
- Wingspan: 7.08 m (23 ft 3 in)
- Wing area: 13.30 m^{2} (143.2 sq ft)
- Empty weight: 400 kg (882 lb)
- Gross weight: 606 kg (1,336 lb)
- Powerplant: 1 × Oberursel U.II 9-cylinder rotary engine, 82 kW (110 hp)
- Propellers: 2-bladed

Performance

- Endurance: 1.5 hr
- Time to altitude: 24 min to 5,000 m (16,405 ft)

Armament

- 2 × LMG 08/15 7.9 mm (0.311 in) machine guns
