= Rumpler D.I =

D.I
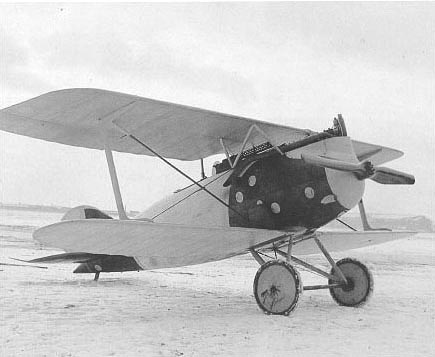
- Rumpler 7D 7 (1918), predecessor of the D.I

General information
- Type: Fighter
- National origin: Germany
- Manufacturer: Rumpler

History
- First flight: 1917

The Rumpler D.I (factory designation 8D1) was a fighter-reconnaissance aircraft produced in Germany at the end of World War I. It was a conventional single-bay biplane with wings of unequal span braced by I-struts. It featured an open cockpit and a fixed, tailskid undercarriage. The upper wing was fitted with aerodynamically balanced ailerons and fuselage had an oval cross-section.

== Design and development ==
The D.I had a protracted development through the course of 1917, with at least six development prototypes built before Rumpler settled on a final design in 1918 in time for the Idflieg's D-type competition at Adlershof. Two 8D1s participated, powered by Mercedes D.III engines. Another one participated in the follow-on competition in autumn, this time with a BMW engine.

== Operational history ==
The Idflieg approved the type for production and issued the designation D.I, but only a small number were produced; the war was practically over and none saw operational service.

== Variants ==
- 7D1 - initial prototype with comma-style balanced rudder, wide-chord I-struts, and upper wing supported by pylon faired into engine cowling. The entire fuselage was skinned in plywood. The radiator was mounted in the upper wing, set off the port side of the supporting pylon.
- 7D2 - identical to 7D1 but with vertical stabiliser added
- 7D4 - similar to 7D2 with conventional struts in place of I-struts, conventional cabane struts in place of central pylon, radiator moved to wing centreline, and central fuselage skinned in fabric.
- 7D5
- 7D7 - similar to 7D4 but with wing bracing again using I-struts (this time of narrow chord) and the bracing wires simplified. The flush-mounted radiator in the wing was replaced by ear-style frontal radiators on the forward fuselage
- 7D8 - very similar to 7D7, with wire bracing simplified further (no landing wires at all)
- 8D1 - final version approved for production as D I

== Operators ==
German Empire

- Luftstreitkräfte

== Specifications (D.I) ==
Data from Kroschel and Stützer 1994, p. 159.

General characteristics

- Crew: One
- Length: 5.75 m (18 ft 10 in)
- Wingspan: 8.42 m (27 ft 8 in)
- Height: 2.56 m (8 ft 5 in)
- Empty weight: 630 kg (1,390 lb)
- Gross weight: 846 kg (1,860 lb)
- Powerplant: 1 × Mercedes D.III , 120 kW (160 hp)

Performance

- Maximum speed: 180 km/h (110 mph, 96 kn)
- Range: 360 km (230 mi, 200 nmi)
- Service ceiling: 7,000 m (23,000 ft)

Armament

- 2 × fixed, forward-firing 7.92 mm (.312 in) LMG 08/15 machine guns

== See also ==
- LFG Roland D.XVII
- Fokker D.VIII
- Kondor D 2
- Aviatik D.VII
- Albatros D.XII
- Zeppelin-Lindau D.I
