= Fokker C.I =

Reconnaissance aircraft

C.I
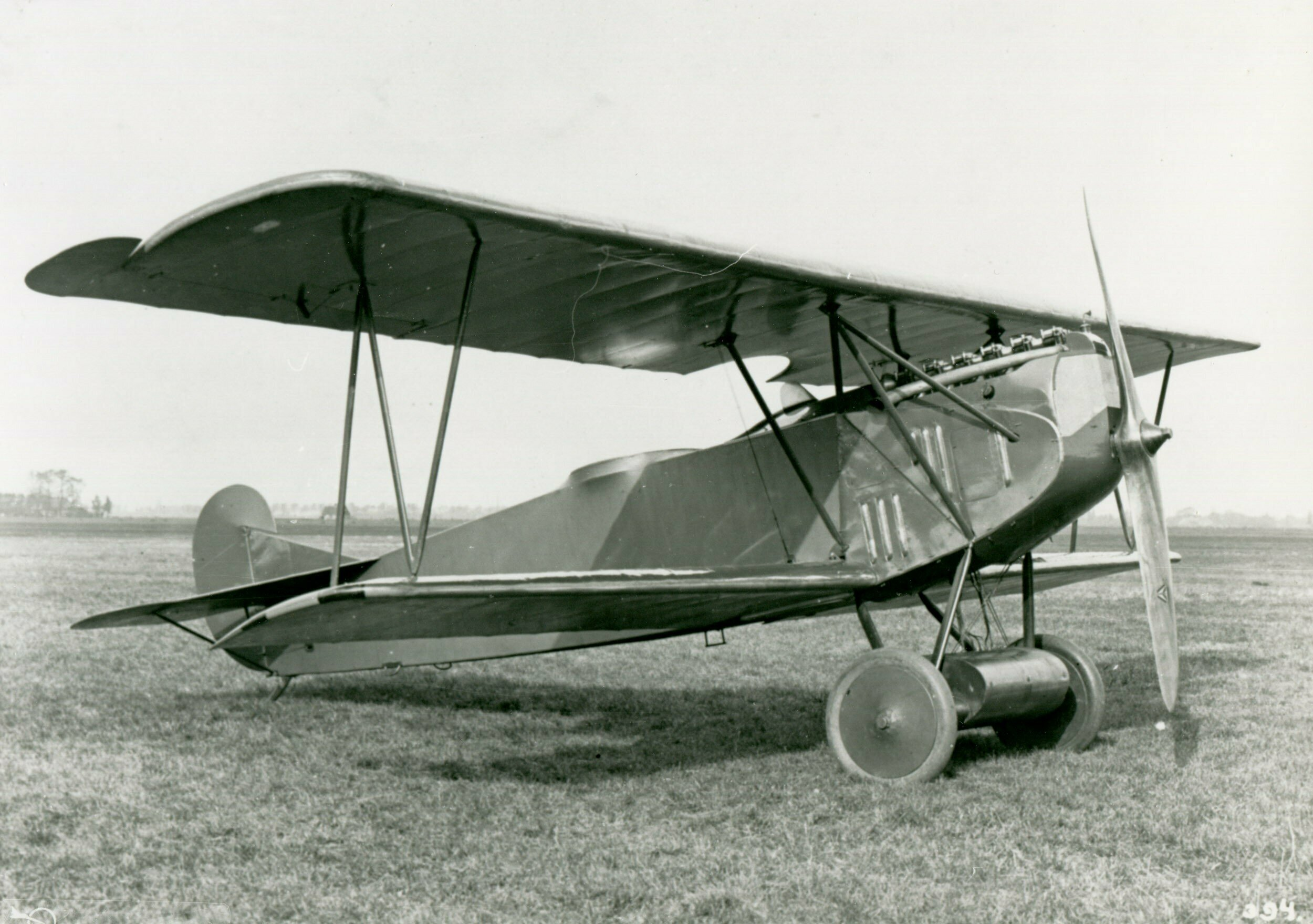
- Fokker C.I

General information
- Type: Reconnaissance aircraft
- Manufacturer: Fokker
- Number built: 250+

History
- First flight: 1918

The Fokker C.I was a German reconnaissance biplane under development at the end of World War I. The design was essentially an enlarged Fokker D.VII fighter with two seats and a 138 kW (185 hp) BMW IIIa engine. The C.I was originally developed to sell to the German Army. It never saw service in World War I, but Anthony Fokker managed to smuggle parts out of Germany at the time of the Armistice.

== Development ==
The prototype, V.38, was tested at Schwerin, and put into immediate production. After the armistice, production continued in the Netherlands.

== Operators ==
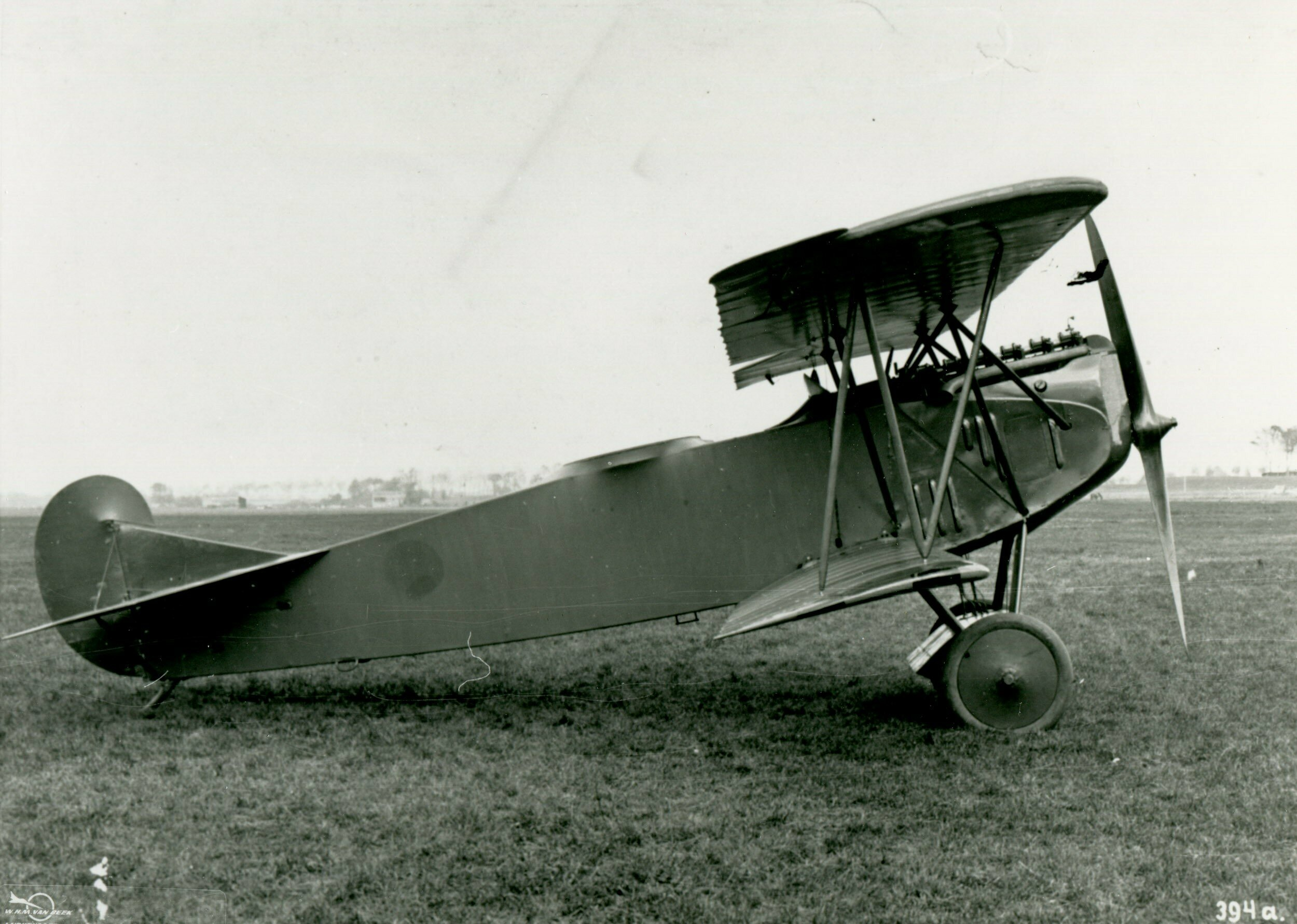

The C.I went into Dutch service after 16 were ordered in February 1919. The USSR bought 42 C.Is. The C.Is served in the reconnaissance and trainer roles. The last C.I left service in 1936.

Denmark

- Royal Danish Air Force

German Empire

- Luftstreitkräfte

Netherlands

- Royal Netherlands Navy
- Dutch Army Aviation

United States

- United States Navy - Two aircraft were purchased by US Navy in 1921.

Soviet Union

- Soviet Air Force

== Variants ==
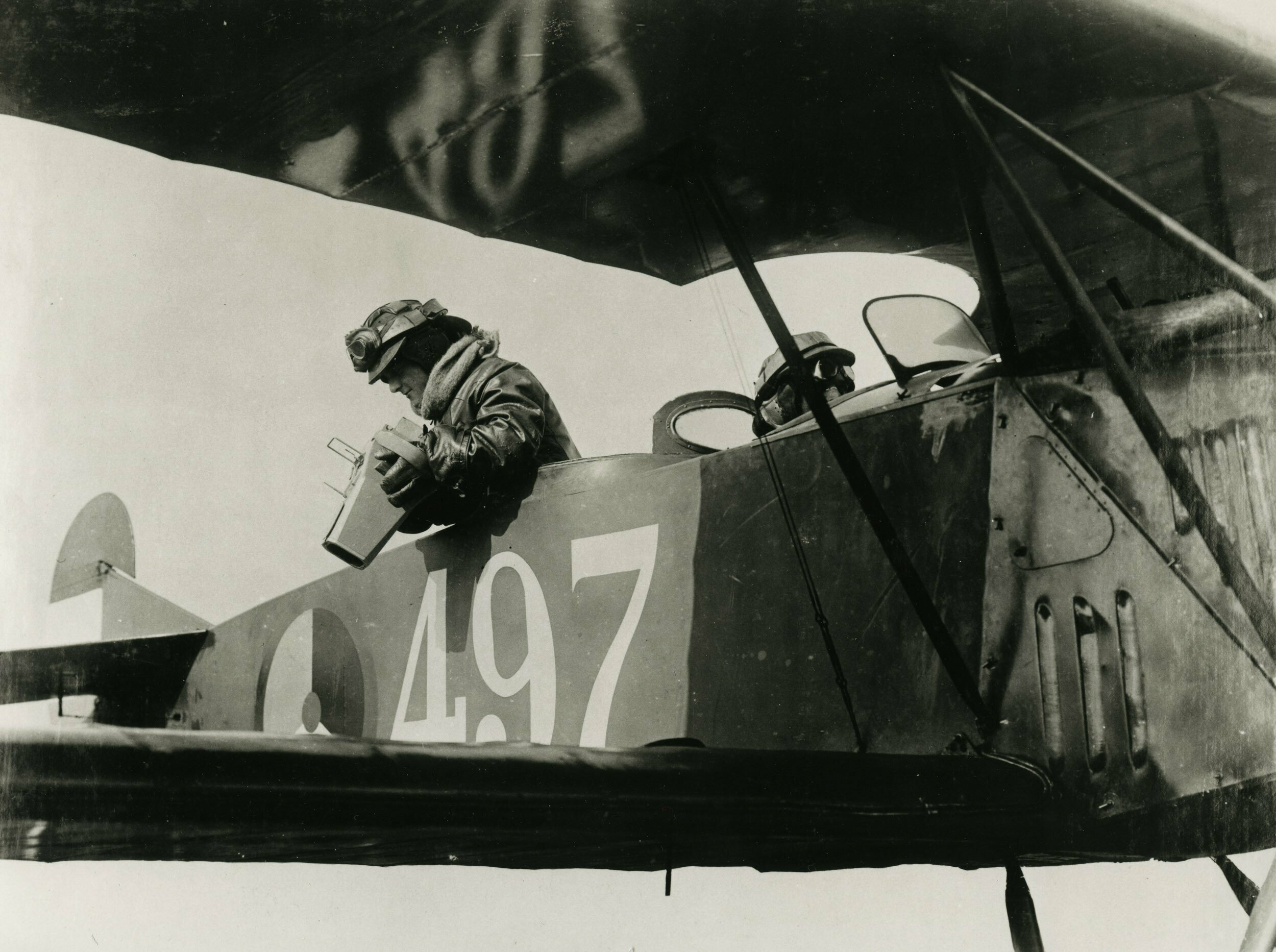
The back-seat camera operator aims his instrument down in the Fokker C.Ia belonging to the Dutch Luchtvaartafdeling.

V 38
Prototype.
C.I
Two-seat reconnaissance aircraft, powered by a 138 kW (185 hp) BMW IIIa piston engine.
C.Ia
Improved version.
C.IW
Experimental floatplane version.
C.II
Three-seat passenger transport version, powered by a 138 kW (185 hp) BMW IIIa piston engine.
C.III
Two-seat advanced trainer version of the C.I, powered by a 164 kW (220 hp) Hispano-Suiza 8B engine.

== Specifications (Fokker C.I) ==
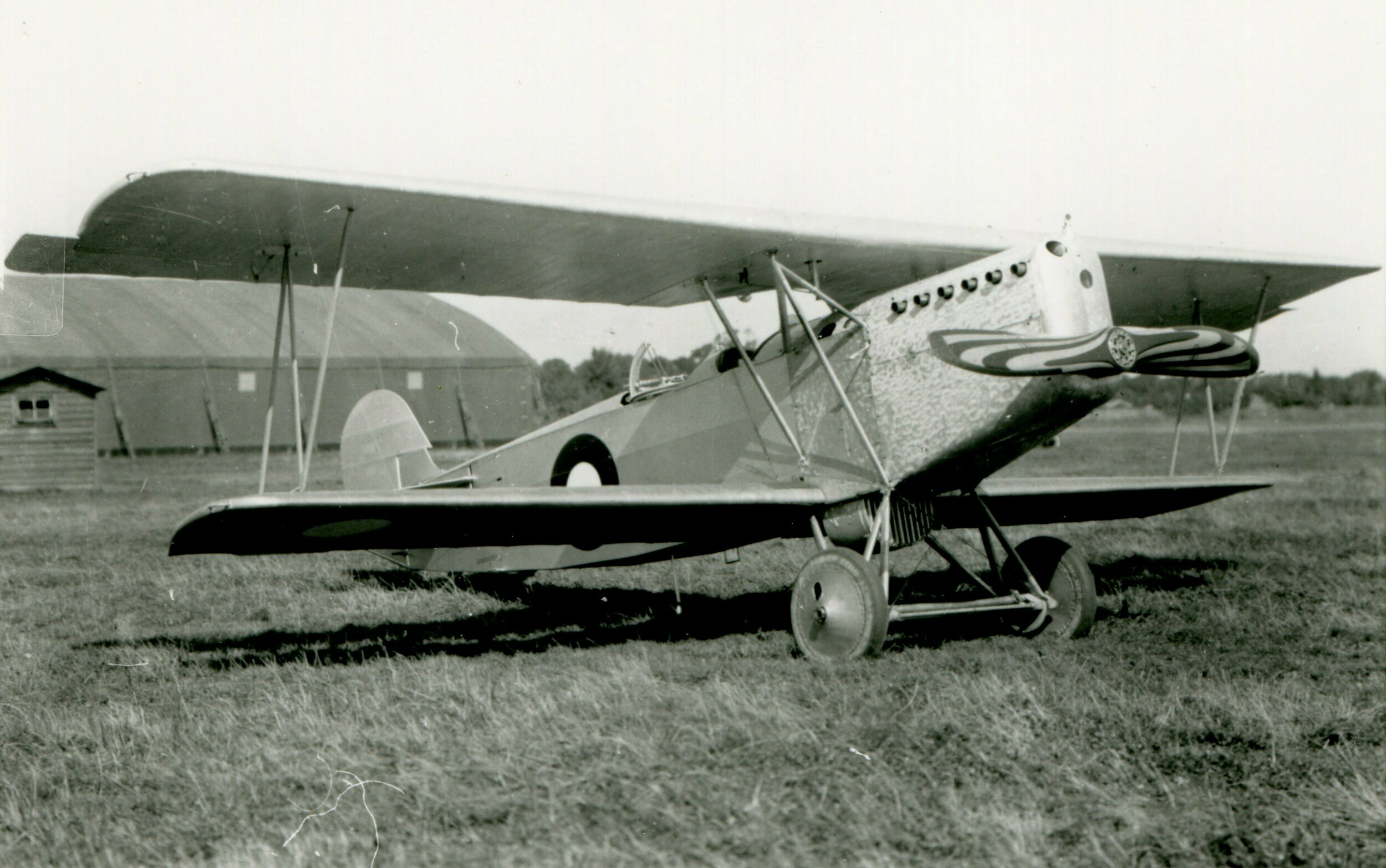
A prototype of the Danish O-Maskinen trainer aircraft based on the C.I.

General characteristics

- Crew: 2
- Length: 7.23 m (23 ft 9 in)
- Wingspan: 10.5 m (34 ft 5 in)
- Height: 2.87 m (9 ft 5 in)
- Wing area: 26.3 m^{2} (283 sq ft)
- Empty weight: 855 kg (1,885 lb)
- Gross weight: 1,255 kg (2,767 lb)
- Powerplant: 1 × BMW IIIa 6-cyl. water-cooled in-line piston engine, 138 kW (185 hp)

Performance

- Maximum speed: 175 km/h (109 mph, 94 kn)
- Range: 320 km (200 mi, 170 nmi)
- Service ceiling: 4,000 m (13,000 ft)

Armament

- 1 × fixed, forward-firing machine gun
- 1 × trainable, rearward-firing machine gun
- Up to 50 kg (110 lb) of disposable stores
