= Kondor D 1 =

WWI German fighter aircraft

D 1
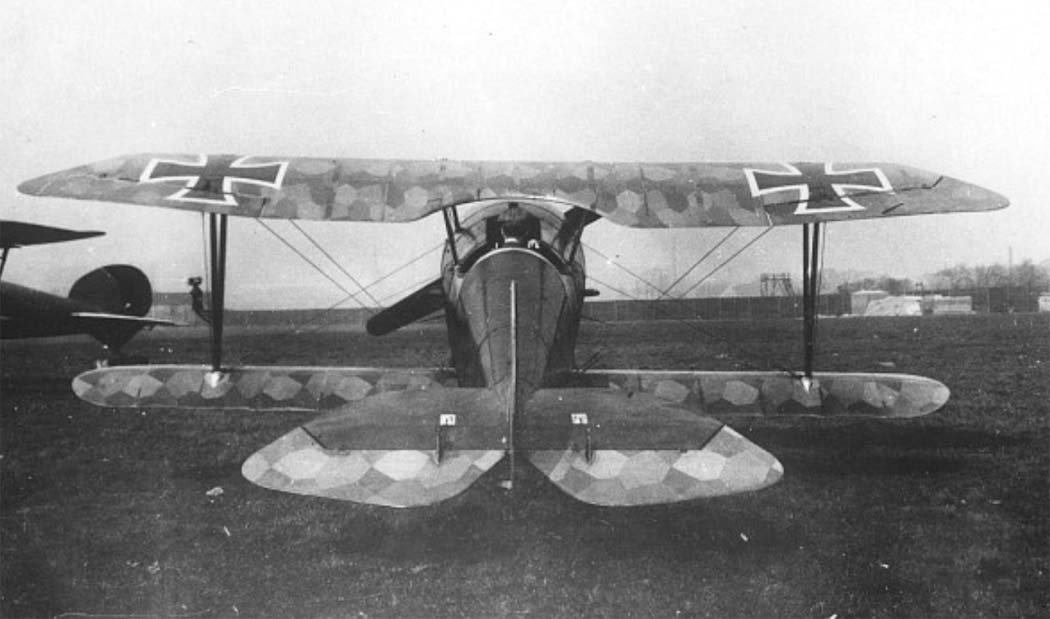

General information
- Type: Fighter aircraft
- National origin: Germany
- Manufacturer: Kondor Flugzeugwerke, Essen
- Designer: Walter Rethel and Paul Ehrhardt
- Status: prototype only
- Number built: 1

History
- First flight: Autumn 1917
- Variant: Kondor D 2

The Kondor D 1, given the unofficial name Kondorlaus, was a German single seat, biplane fighter aircraft designed and built close to the end of WWI.

== Design and development ==
The Kondor D 1 was an unequal span single-seat biplane of wooden construction, powered by a 100 hp (75 kW) Gnome Monosoupape rotary engine and armed with two 7.92 mm (0.312 in) LMG 08/15 Spandau machine guns. The D 1 had a single spar lower wing with V interplane struts, similar to Nieuport 11 practice.

The first flight of the Kondor D 1 occurred in the autumn of 1917, but test flights showed it to be underpowered and Walter Rethel, with Paul Ehrhardt, developed an improved version of the design, the Kondor D 2, which Rethel completed after Ehrhardt retired due to ill health.

Confusion reigned after the second D-type competition at Aldershof because the Idflieg referred to the two Kondor D 2 prototypes as the D.I and D.II during the competition, which were actually fictitious designations.

== Specifications (D 1) ==
Data from The Complete Book of Fighters

General characteristics

- Crew: One
- Length: 4.85 m (15 ft 11 in)
- Wingspan: 7.60 m (24 ft 11 in)
- Height: 2.40 m (7 ft 10 in)
- Wing area: 13.35 m^{2} (143.7 sq ft)
- Empty weight: 388 kg (855 lb)
- Gross weight: 568 kg (1,252 lb)
- Powerplant: 1 × Gnome Monosoupape 9 Type B 9-cylinder, air-cooled rotary engine, 75 kW (100 hp)
- Propellers: 2-bladed

Performance

- Time to altitude: 5,000 m (16,000 ft) in 30 minutes 36 seconds

Armament

- Guns: 2 x 7.92 mm (0.312 in) LMG 08/15 Spandau machine guns with 500 rpg

== Bibliography ==
- Gray, Peter & Thetford, Owen (1987) [1970]. German Aircraft of the First World War (2nd ed.). London: Putnam. ISBN 0-85177-809-7.
- Green, William & Swanborough, Gordon (2001) [1994]. The Complete Book of Fighters: An Illustrated Encyclopedia of Every Fighter Built and Flown (Revised and Updated ed.). London: Salamander Books. ISBN 1-84065-269-1.
- Herris, Jack (2020). German Aircraft of Minor Manufacturers in WWI: A Centennial Perspective on Great War Airplanes. Gret War Aviation Centennial Series (49). Vol. 1: Alter to Korn. n.p.: Aeronaut Books. ISBN 978-1-935881-85-8.
