= Albatros D.XI =

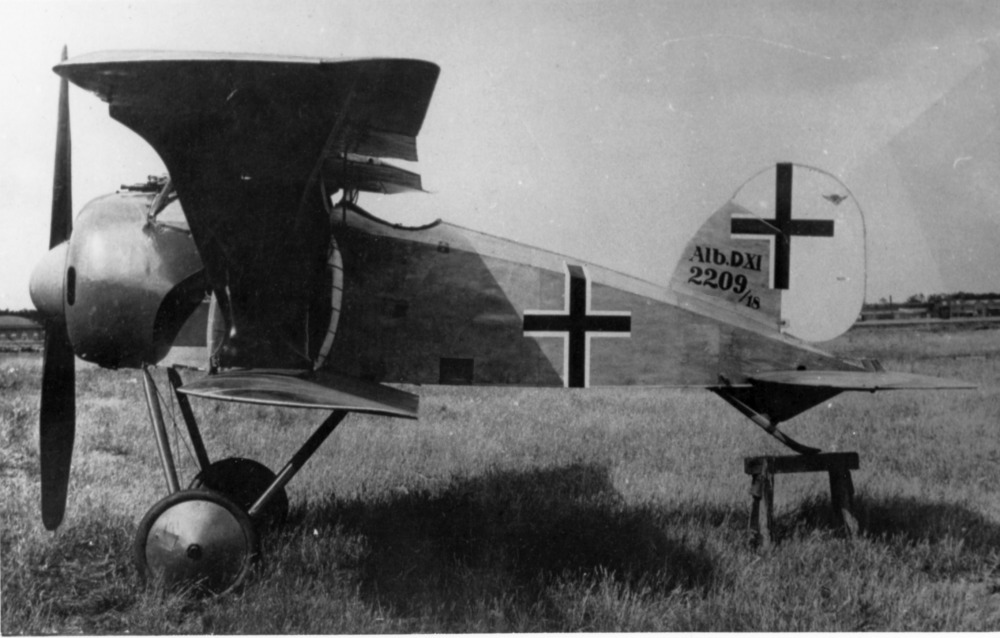

General information
- Type: Fighter
- Manufacturer: Albatros Flugzeugwerke
- Primary user: Germany
- Number built: 2

History
- First flight: February 1918
- Retired: 1918

The Albatros D.XI was a German single-seat fighter sesquiplane first flown in February 1918. It was the first Albatros fighter to use a rotary engine, in the form of the 120 kW (160 hp) Siemens-Halske Sh.III, and also featured a new wing construction with diagonal struts from the fuselage replacing traditional wire bracing.

== Design & development ==
The wings had unequal spans with the upper planes having greater span than the lower ones, and were braced by I-struts with an aerofoil cross-section, additional rigidity being provided by twinned diagonal struts from the base of these to the top of the fuselage, located where the "landing wires" of a normal wire-braced biplane would be. The use of a rotary engine necessitated a large-diameter propeller and a correspondingly tall undercarriage.

The D.XI was armed with the same twin 7.92 mm (.312 in) Spandau LMG 08/15 machine guns employed on other Albatros fighters. Two prototypes were built, the first having balanced, parallel-chord ailerons and a four-blade propeller; and the second with inversely tapered, unbalanced ailerons and a two-blade propeller. The D.XI was not put into production.

== Specifications (D.XI) ==
General characteristics

- Crew: one pilot
- Length: 5.58 m (18 ft 4 in)
- Wingspan: 8.00 m (26 ft 3 in)
- Wing area: 18.5 m^{2} (199 sq ft)
- Empty weight: 494 kg (1,089 lb)
- Gross weight: 723 kg (1,594 lb)
- Powerplant: 1 × Siemens-Halske Sh.III , 120 kW (160 hp)

Performance

- Maximum speed: 190 km/h (120 mph, 100 kn)
- Endurance: 2 hours

Armament

- 2 × forward-firing 7.92 mm (.312 in) LMG 08/15 machine guns
