= Dornier Do H Falke =

1920s German fighter aircraft

Do H Falke
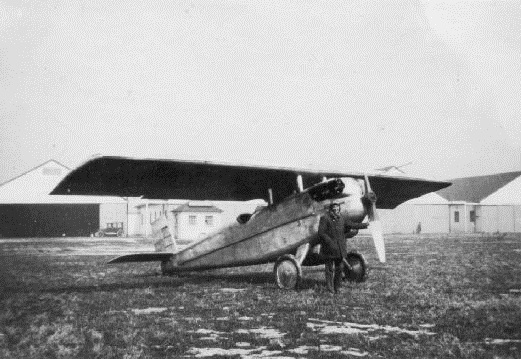
- The WP-1 under test with the US Navy in about 1923

General information
- Type: Fighter
- Manufacturer: Dornier Flugzeugwerke
- Designer: Claude Dornier
- Primary user: United States Navy
- Number built: 5

History
- First flight: 1922
- Developed from: Zeppelin-Lindau D.I
- Variants: Kawasaki KDA-3

The Dornier Do H Falke (Falcon) was a German single-seat fighter, designed by Claude Dornier and built by Dornier Flugzeugwerke. Although an advanced design for its time, being evaluated by the United States Navy as the Wright WP-1, it did not go into production.

== Development ==
The company started to design a prototype fighter in the early 1920s, based on earlier wartime designs like the Zeppelin-Lindau D.I. It was an all-metal high-wing cantilever monoplane, with the wing above the fuselage on four small struts. It had a conventional cantilever tail unit and a fixed tailskid landing gear. The pilot had an open cockpit just behind the trailing edge of the wing. The aircraft was powered by a Hispano-Suiza piston engine located in the nose. Two aircraft were built by the Swiss subsidiary of Dornier and three by S.D.C.M.P. in Italy, to avoid restrictions on military aircraft production in Germany. It first flew on 1 November 1922, but failed to go into production. One of the Falkes was converted to a floatplane in 1923, powered by a 261 kW (350 hp) BMW IVa V-12 engine, as the Dornier Seefalke.

One Seefalke was shipped to the United States of America by the Wright Aeronautical Company, who fitted it with a licence-built Wright-Hisso H-3 engine. It was evaluated by the United States Navy with the designation Wright WP-1. It performed well, but the Navy considered the monoplane fighter too advanced for its needs.

== Operators ==
United States

- United States Navy

== Specifications (Dornier-Wright WP-1) ==
Data from The Illustrated Encyclopedia of Aircraft (Part Work 1982-1985), 1985, Orbis Publishing, Page 1480

General characteristics

- Crew: one
- Length: 7.43 m (24 ft 4.33 in)
- Wingspan: 10 m (32 ft 9.75 in)
- Height: 2.66 m (8 ft 8.75 in)
- Wing area: 20 m^{2} (215.29 sq ft)
- Empty weight: 825 kg (1,819 lb)
- Gross weight: 1,213 kg (2,674 lb)
- Powerplant: 1 × Wright-Hisso H-3 V-8 piston engine , 239 kW (320 hp)

Performance

- Maximum speed: 261 km/h (162 mph, 141 kn)
- Range: 350 km (217 mi, 189 nmi)

== See also ==
Related lists

- List of United States Navy aircraft designations (pre-1962)

== Bibliography ==
- The Illustrated Encyclopedia of Aircraft, (Part Work 1982-1985), Orbis Publishing
- Andrade, John. U.S. Military Aircraft Designations and Serials since 1909, Midland Counties Publications, 1979, ISBN 0-904597-22-9.
- Swanborough, Gordon and Bowers, Peter M. United States Navy Aircraft since 1911. London: Putnam. Second Edition, 1976. ISBN 0-370-10054-9.
- Zuerl, Walter (1941). Deutsche Flugzeug Konstrukteure. München, Germany: Curt Pechstein Verlag.
