= Pfalz D.VIII =

D.VIII
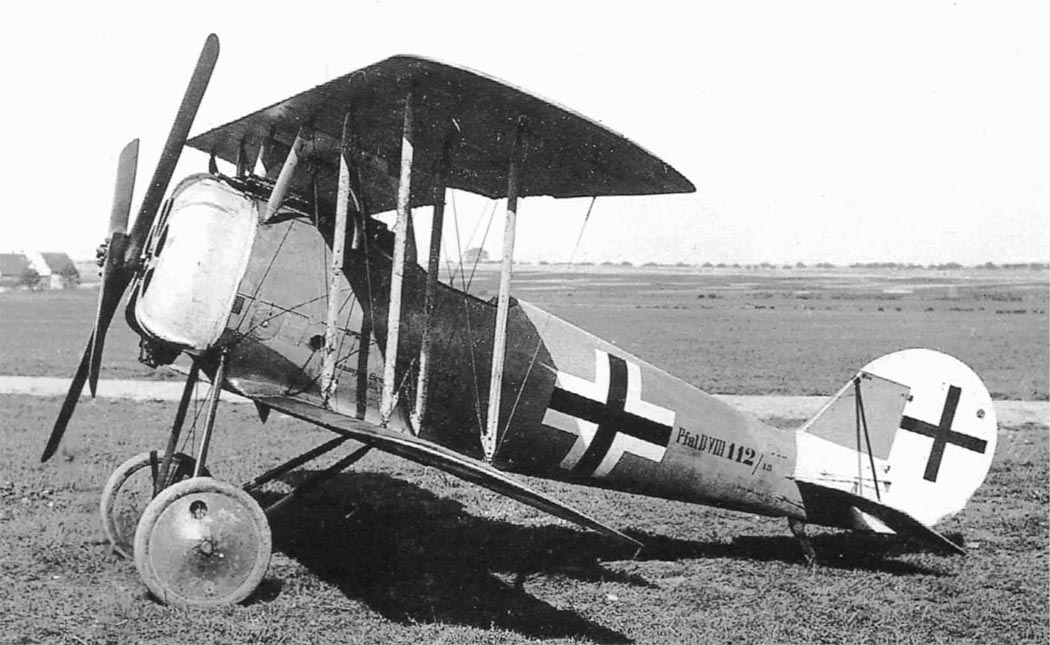

General information
- Type: Fighter
- National origin: Germany
- Manufacturer: Pfalz Flugzeugwerke GmbH
- Primary user: Luftstreitkräfte
- Number built: 40

History
- Manufactured: 1918
- Introduction date: 1918
- First flight: 1918

The Pfalz D.VIII was a German World War I fighter aircraft.

== Development ==
The D.VIII was approved for production arising from German initiatives in 1918 to develop superior fighter aircraft. Its power unit, the Siemens-Halske Sh.III rotary enabled the type to achieve a top speed of 120 miles per hour (190 km/h) at sea level. Armament was twin 7.92mm Spandau machine guns.

== Production ==
Forty units were completed but as this was very near the end of the war, they were used mostly for evaluation purposes.

== Specifications (D.VIII - (Sh III engine)) ==
Data from German Aircraft of the First World War

General characteristics

- Crew: 1
- Length: 5.65 m (18 ft 6 in)
- Wingspan: 7.52 m (24 ft 8 in)
- Height: 2.75 m (9 ft 0 in)
- Wing area: 17.2 m^{2} (185 sq ft)
- Empty weight: 543 kg (1,197 lb)
- Gross weight: 738 kg (1,627 lb)
- Powerplant: 1 × Siemens-Halske Sh.III 11-cylinder air-cooled geared rotary engine, 119 kW (160 hp)
- Alternative engines (prototypes only):

- Oberursel U.III 119 kW (160 hp)
- Goebel Goe.III 104 kW (140 hp)

- Propellers: 4-bladed fixed-pitch propeller

Performance

- Maximum speed: 190 km/h (120 mph, 100 kn)
- Endurance: 1 hour 30 minutes
- Time to altitude: 6,000 m (20,000 ft) in 25 minutes
- Wing loading: 42.9 kg/m^{2} (8.8 lb/sq ft)
- Power/mass: 0.16 kW/kg (0.097 hp/lb)

Armament

- Guns: 2 × 7.92 mm (0.31 in) LMG 08/15 machine guns

== See also ==
Aircraft of comparable role, configuration, and era

- Siemens-Schuckert D.IV
