= Siemens-Halske Sh.III =

11-cylinder radial piston engine

Sh.III
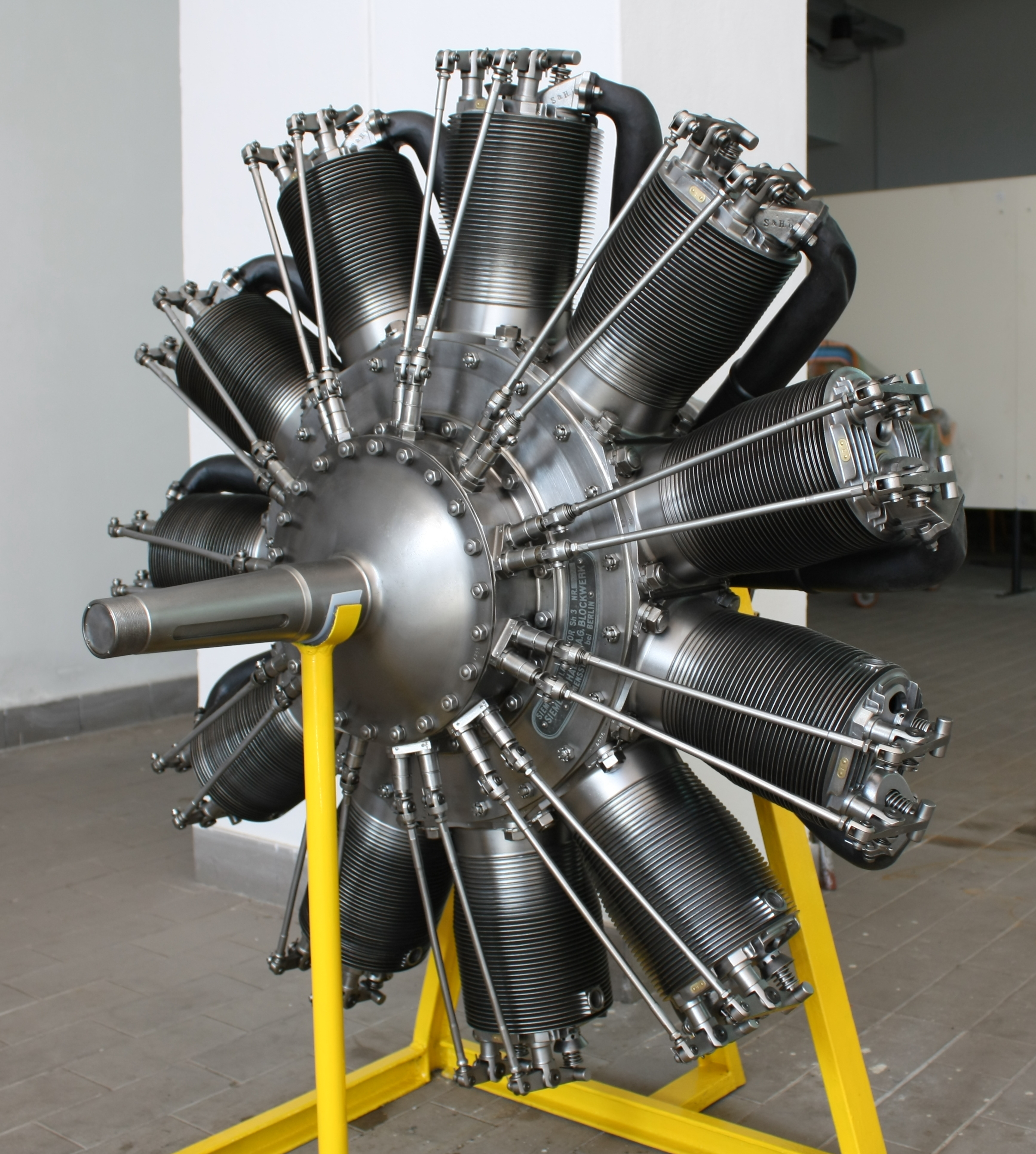
- A Siemens-Halske Sh.III at the Museo Storico dei Motori e dei Meccanismi in, Palermo, Italy
- Type: Counter Rotary engine
- National origin: Germany
- Manufacturer: Siemens-Halske
- Major applications: Siemens-Schuckert D.III and D.IV
- Number built: approx 1,200
- Developed from: Siemens-Halske Sh.1

The Siemens-Halske Sh.III was an 11-cylinder, air-cooled counter rotary engine developed in Germany during World War I. The engine was a development of the earlier 9-cylinder Siemens-Halske Sh.I.

== Design ==
Animation of the engine as it would have been seen looking at the front of the aircraft

The Siemens-Halske Sh.III was an 11-cylinder counter rotary engine. The Sh.III's propeller and cylinders were connected, rotating anti-clockwise when viewed from the front of the aircraft (clockwise when viewed from the pilot's seat) while the crankshaft rotated clockwise.

The crankshaft was driven at 900 rpm via a set of bevel gears, located at the back of the engine, with a 2:1 ratio. The cylinders and propeller would have rotated at a speed of 1800 rpm anti-clockwise had the crankshaft been fixed. With the crankshaft rotating at 900 rpm clockwise the net propeller rotational speed was reduced to 900 rpm.

The counter rotary design allowed the engine to achieve the benefits of a high-power density from a high rotational speed while the propeller operated at a slower speed optimised for its design. By the end of WW1, operating the propeller at a slower speed than the engine had become normal practice for inline and V block engines but had proved difficult to accomplish on rotary engines.

Additional benefits of the counter rotary design were lower aerodynamic losses and reduced gyroscopic forces as the net cylinder rotational speed was reduced when compared to a conventional rotary of similar power output.

Unlike most rotary engines the Sh.III had a throttle which could reduce engine speed to 350 rpm.

The Sh.III was initially designed with a power output of 160 hp. A later variant, the Sh.IIIa, had a power output of 200 hp with some examples developing as much as 240 hp.

In operation the Sh.III suffered from poor reliability. The engine tended to overheat as the relatively slow rotation of the cylinders limited cooling air flow. Additionally, seizures of the engine were caused by poor lubrication as the Germans did not have access to castor oil which was one of the few oils that could retain its properties after being mixed with gasoline.

== Aircraft ==
- Albatros H.1
- Albatros D.XI
- Pfalz D.VII
- Pfalz D.VIII
- LFG Roland D.IX
- LFG Roland D.XVI
- Siemens-Schuckert D.II
- Siemens-Schuckert D.III
- Siemens-Schuckert D.IV
- Siemens-Schuckert D.VI

== Specifications ==
Data from Airplane Engine Encyclopedia

=== General characteristics ===
- Type: 11-cylinder counter rotary engine
- Bore: 124 mm (4.9 in)
- Stroke: 140 mm (5.5 in)
- Displacement: 18.6 L (1,140 cu in)
- Diameter: 1,070 mm (42 in)
- Dry weight: 195 kg (430 lb)

=== Performance ===
- Power output: 120 kW (160 hp) [up to a maximum of 180 kW (240 hp)]
- Power-to-weight ratio: 0.616 kW/kg (0.375 hp/lb)

== See also ==
- List of aircraft engines
