= Kondor D 2 =

WWI German fighter aircraft

D 2
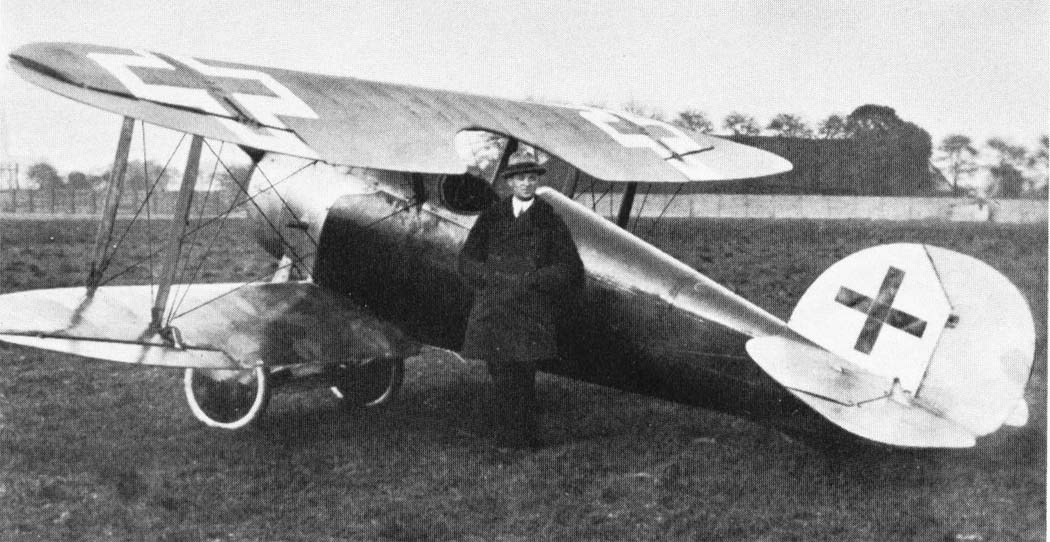

General information
- Type: Fighter aircraft
- National origin: Germany
- Manufacturer: Kondor Flugzeugwerke, Essen
- Designer: Walter Rethel
- Status: prototype only
- Number built: 2

History
- First flight: May 1918
- Developed from: Kondor D 1

The Kondor D 2 was a German single seat, biplane fighter aircraft designed and built close to the end of World War I.

== Design and development ==
The Kondor D 2 was a basically a redesign of the D 1, which had proven underpowered in flight tests. Like the D 1, the D 2 was a single-seat biplane of wooden construction, powered by a 110 hp (82 kW) Oberursel Ur.II rotary engine and armed with two 7.92 mm (0.312 in) LMG 08/15 Spandau machine guns. However, the D 2 differed from its predecessor in having equal span wings with a two-spar lower wing with parallel inter-plane struts. The first flight of the Kondor D 2 took place in May 1918, in time for the second D-type competition at Aldershof in June 1918. Oberleutnant Hermann Göring praised the aircraft's flying qualities, but criticised the poor performance, consequently the D 2 was not ordered into production.

Confusion reigned after the competition, up to the present day, because the Idflieg referred to the two D 2 prototypes as the D.I and D.II during the competition, which were actually fictitious designations.

The first D 2 prototype had ailerons on the upper wings, while the second D 2 prototype had ailerons on both upper and lower wings.

== Specifications (D 2) ==
Data from The Complete Book of Fighters

General characteristics

- Crew: One
- Length: 4.87 m (16 ft 0 in)
- Wingspan: 7.59 m (24 ft 11 in)
- Height: 2.41 m (7 ft 11 in)
- Wing area: 13.34 m^{2} (143.6 sq ft)
- Empty weight: 380 kg (838 lb)
- Gross weight: 560 kg (1,235 lb)
- Powerplant: 1 × Oberursel Ur.II 9-cylinder, air-cooled rotary engine, 82 kW (110 hp)
- Propellers: 2-bladed wooden fixed-pitch propeller

Performance

- Maximum speed: 175 km/h (109 mph, 94 kn)
- Cruise speed: 150 km/h (93 mph, 81 kn)
- Endurance: 1.5 hours
- Time to altitude: 3,000 m (9,800 ft) in 10 minutes 24 seconds

Armament

- Guns: 2 x fixed forward firing synchronised 7.92 mm (0.312 in) LMG 08/15 Spandau machine guns

== Bibliography ==
- Gray, Peter & Thetford, Owen (1987) [1970]. German Aircraft of the First World War (2nd ed.). London: Putnam. ISBN 0-85177-809-7.
- Green, William & Swanborough, Gordon (2001) [1994]. The Complete Book of Fighters: An Illustrated Encyclopedia of Every Fighter Built and Flown (Revised and Updated ed.). London: Salamander Books. ISBN 1-84065-269-1.
- Herris, Jack (2020). German Aircraft of Minor Manufacturers in WWI: A Centennial Perspective on Great War Airplanes. Gret War Aviation Centennial Series (49). Vol. 1: Alter to Korn. n.p.: Aeronaut Books. ISBN 978-1-935881-85-8.
