= Fokker D.VIII =

German fighter aircraft

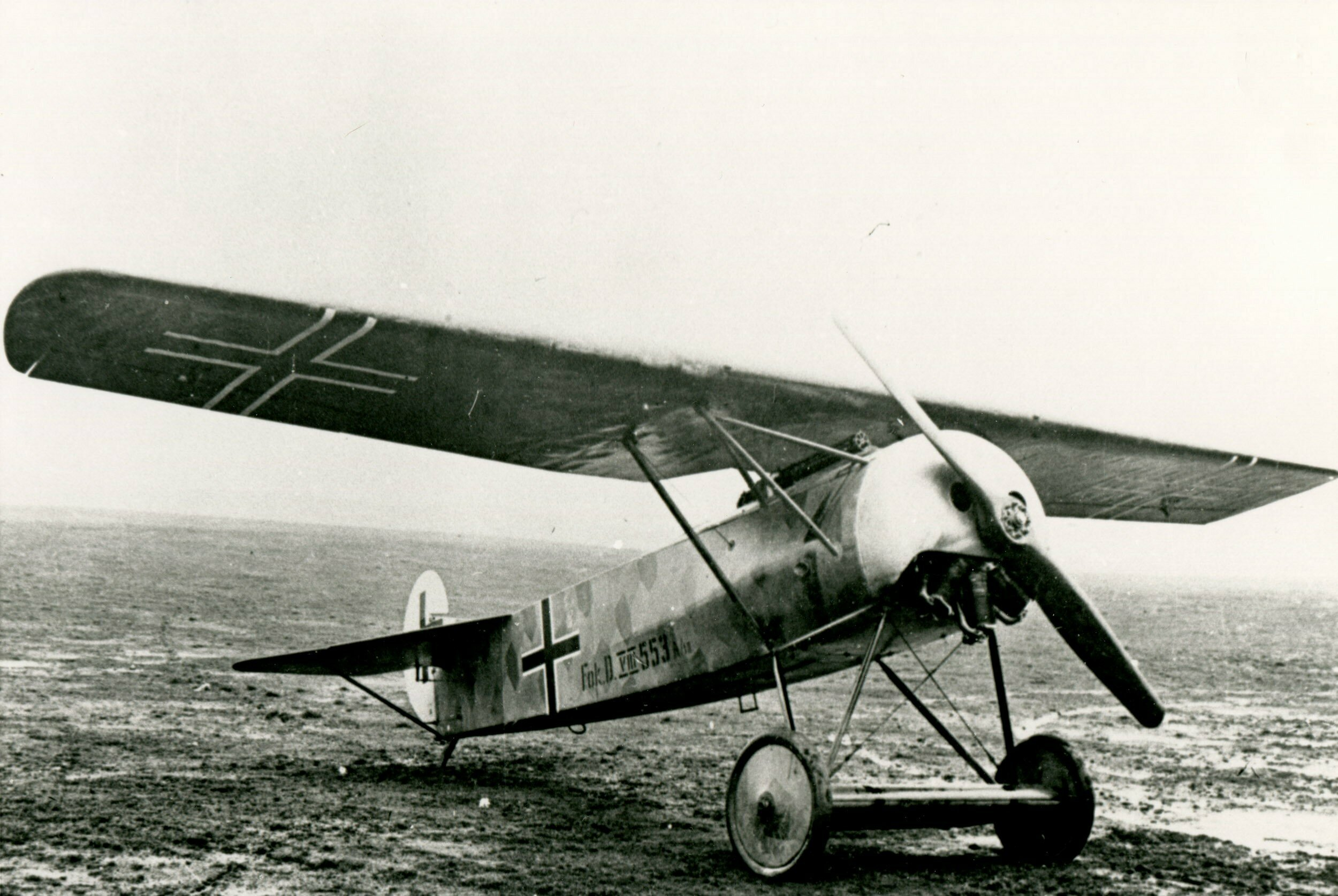

General information
- Type: Fighter
- Manufacturer: Fokker-Flugzeugwerke
- Designer: Reinhold Platz
- Primary user: Luftstreitkräfte
- Number built: approximately 381

History
- First flight: May 1918

The Fokker E.V was a German parasol-monoplane fighter aircraft designed by Reinhold Platz and built by Fokker-Flugzeugwerke. The E.V was the last Fokker design to become operational with the Luftstreitkräfte entering service in the last months of World War I. After several fatal accidents due to wing failures, the aircraft was modified and renamed Fokker D.VIII. Dubbed the Flying Razor by post-war pulp-fiction writers, the D.VIII had the distinction of scoring the last aerial victory of the war.

== Design and development ==
In early 1918, Fokker produced several rotary-powered monoplane prototypes, submitting V.26 and V.28, small parasol-winged monoplanes with his usual steel-tube fuselages, for the second fighter trials at Adlershof in May–June 1918. V.28 was tested with the 108 kW (145 hp) Oberursel Ur.III and 119 kW (160 hp) Goebel Goe.III, though neither of these engines were ready for operational service. The V.26 used the standard Oberursel Ur.II engine, producing only 82 kW (110 hp). The engine was obsolete but the low drag of the V.26 and light weight meant that it was still quite fast. The Fokker designs were only barely beaten by the Siemens-Schuckert D.III with the complex bi-rotary Siemens-Halske Sh.III engine and the V.26 was ordered into production as the Fokker E.V. Four hundred were ordered immediately with either the Ur.III or Goe.III. Because neither engine was available in any quantity, all production examples mounted the Ur.II.

== Operational history ==
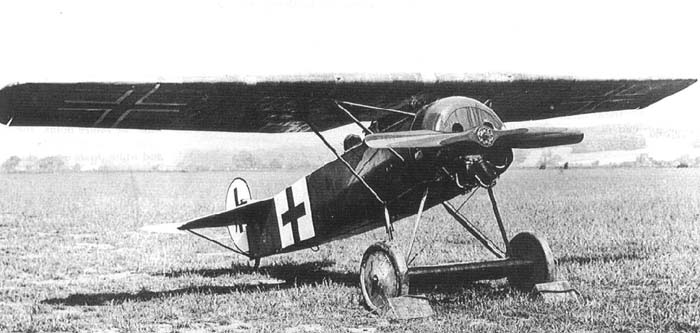
Fokker E.V

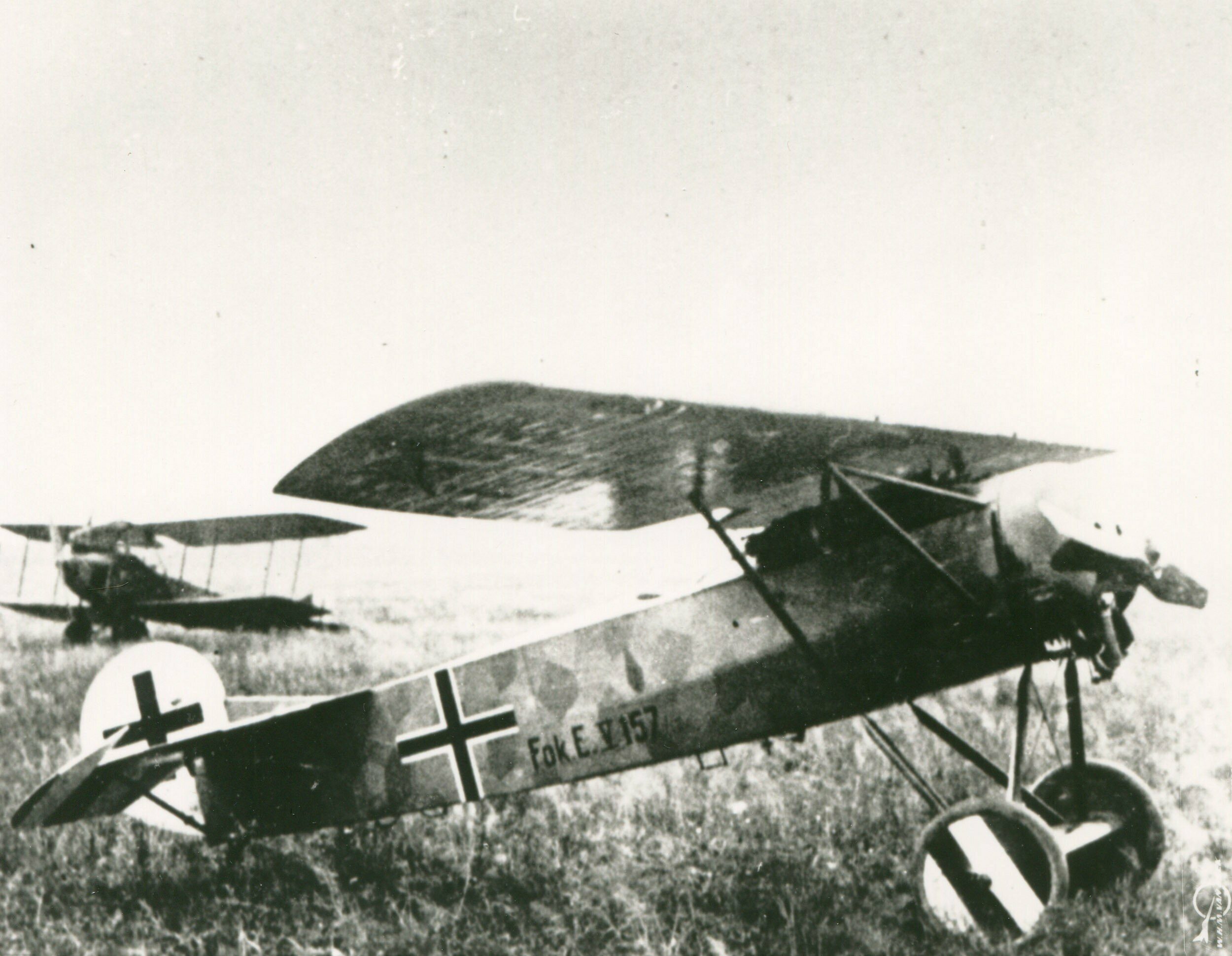
Fokker E.V in 1918

The first production E.V aircraft were shipped to Jagdstaffel 6 (Jasta 6) in late July. The new monoplane was also delivered to Jasta 1, Jasta 19, Jasta 24 and Jasta 36. Leutnant Emil Rolff scored the first kill in an E.V on August 17, 1918 but two days later he was killed when his aircraft's wing collapsed in flight. After another E.V of Jasta 19 crashed, Idflieg grounded all E.V aircraft. Pending the investigation of these wing failures, production ceased at the Fokker Flugzeugwerke. According to Fokker, the wing failures were caused by the army technical bureau, which had forced him to modify the original design by over-strengthening the rear main spar. This faulty design allegedly caused the wing to twist and fail. Fokker claimed that this defect was resolved by reverting to his original design.

According to most other accounts, the source of the wing failures lay not in the design but in shoddy and rushed construction. Fokker had subcontracted construction of the E.V wings to the Gebrüder Perzina Pianoforte Fabrik factory. Due to poor quality control, inferior timber had been used and the spar caps, forming the upper and lower members of each spar assembly, had been placed too far apart during manufacture. Because the resulting spars were vertically too large to pass through the ribs, excess material was simply planed away from the exposed upper and lower surfaces of the cap pieces, leaving the assembled spars dangerously weak. Other problems included water damage to glued parts, and pins that splintered the spars, rather than securing them. Tests showed that, when properly constructed, the original E.V wing had a considerable margin of safety. Satisfied that the basic design was safe, Idflieg authorized continued production, after personnel changes and improved quality control measures were introduced at the Perzina factory.

Deliveries resumed in October. At the direction of the Kommandierenden General der Luftstreitkräfte (Kogenluft) Idflieg renamed the modified aircraft D.VIII. The earlier "E." and "Dr." prefixes for fighter monoplanes and triplanes, respectively, were abolished and all fighters would henceforth receive the "D." prefix. The D.VIII commenced operations on 24 October with Jasta 11. The aircraft proved to be agile and easy to fly. Allied pilots nicknamed it the Flying Razor.

Jasta 5 was issued with a D.VIII. The famed ace Erich Lowenhardt performed a test flight of a Fokker EV whilst paying a visit to Jasta 6 in the summer of 1918, but no evidence of him flying this aircraft on any other occasion exists to date. A total of 381 aircraft were produced, but only about 85 aircraft reached front line service before the Armistice. Some reached Italy, Japan, the United States, and Britain as trophies, but most were scrapped in accordance with the terms of the Armistice.

=== Postwar ===
The Polish Air Force captured 17 aircraft, but only seven (six E.V and one D.VIII) were in an airworthy condition. All were used against Soviet forces in the Polish-Soviet War of 1919–1920. Lieutenant Stefan Stec earned the first kill for the Polish Air Force by shooting down a Ukrainian Nieuport 21 fighter on 29 April 1919. In 1921, the remaining Fokkers were withdrawn from frontline units and transferred to the Szkoła Obsługi Lotniczej (Air Personnel School) at Poznań-Ławica airfield.

== Variants ==
- V 26 : Initial prototype.
- V 27 : V.26 with 195 hp (145 kW) Benz Bz.IIIb V8 engine. Participated in the second D-type competition.
- V 28 : Prototype fitted with either a 108 kW (145 hp) Oberursel Ur.III, or a 118 kW (160 hp) Goebel Goe.III rotary engines.
- V 29 : Larger version of the V.27 initially fitted with a 160 hp (119 kW) Mercedes D.III and later with a 185 hp (138 kW) BMW IIIa, both inline water-cooled engines. Participated in the third D-type competition.
- V 30 : Single-seat glider modification of V.26.

== Operators ==
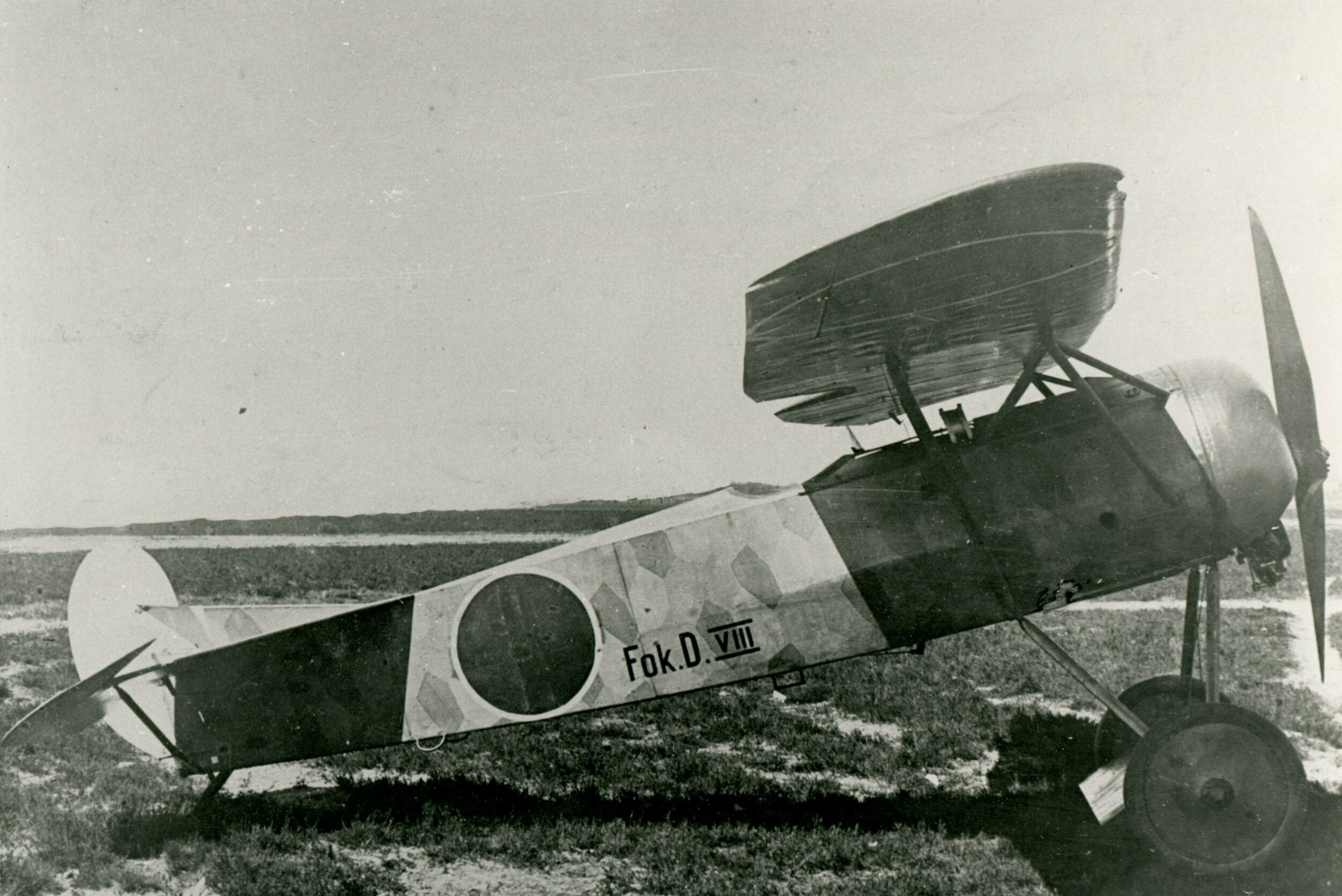
Fokker D.VIII in Dutch markings

Belgium

- Belgian Air Force operated a single captured E.V from 1919 until the early 1920s.

German Empire

- Luftstreitkräfte received 381 aircraft before 11 November 1918.
- Kaiserliche Marine

Netherlands

- Royal Netherlands Air Force

Poland

- Polish Air Force captured 16 E.V and one D.VIII aircraft, but only 7 were operated. Last E.V was still on inventory in 1924.

Soviet Union

- Soviet Air Force captured one aircraft during the Polish-Soviet War and operated it until the mid-1920s.

United States

- United States Army Air Service - Postwar.

== Surviving aircraft ==
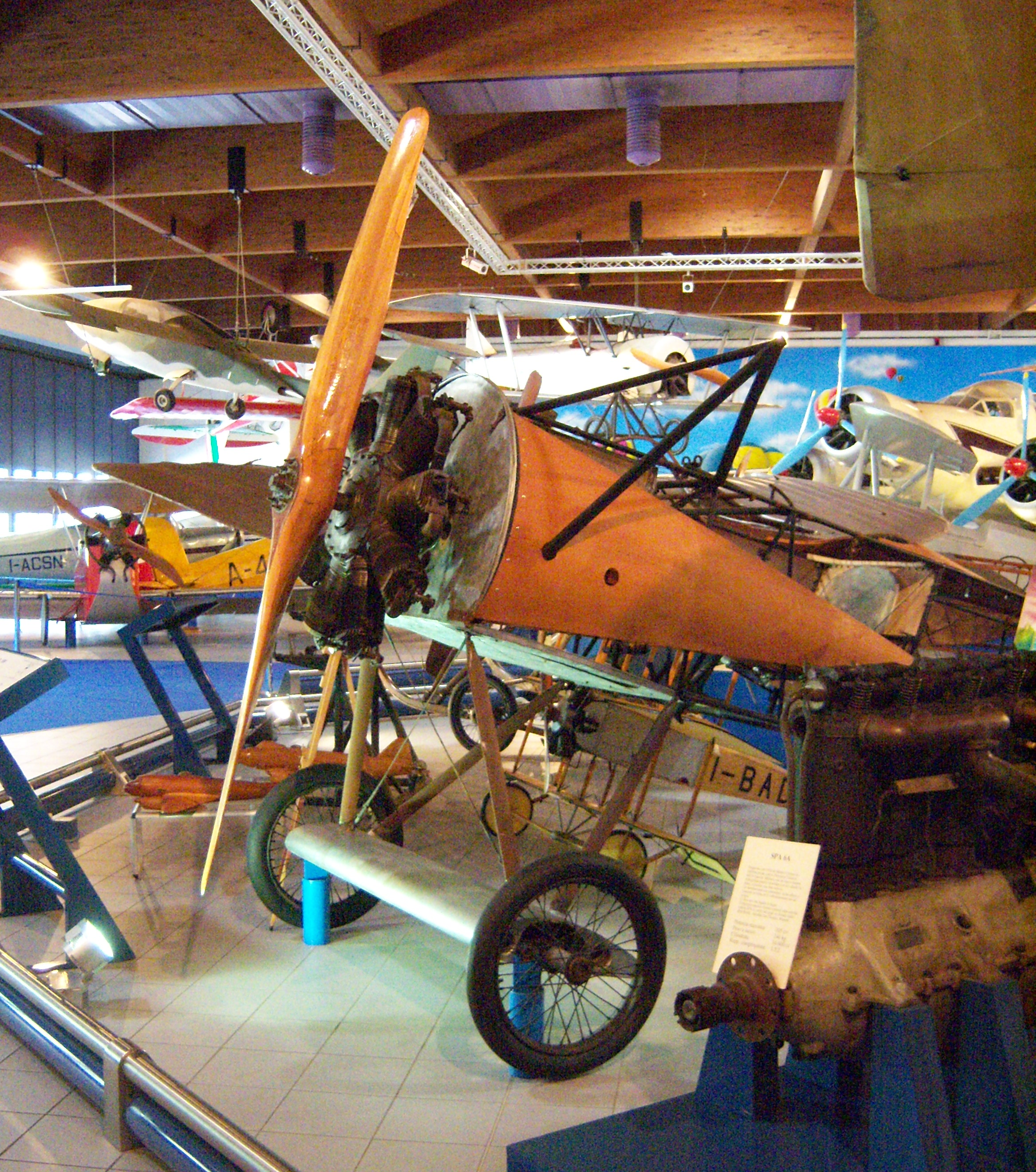
D.VIII at the Caproni Museum

- The fuselage of an original D.VIII is preserved at the Caproni Museum in Trento, Italy.
- A replica D.VIII is at the Alberta Aviation Museum in Edmonton, Alberta.
- A replica E.V marked as 001 (Fok.E.V 185/18) is at the Polish Air Force Museum in Deblin, Poland.
- The Vintage Aviator Ltd. of Masterton, New Zealand, operate two airworthy replicas.
- A replica D.VIII built by Brian Coughlin currently flies at summer airshows at Old Rhinebeck Aerodrome in Rhinebeck, NY, USA Update 10/05/24- Sadly, Brian Coughlin perished in a crash while flying the D.VIII during an airshow.
- A 7/8 scale replica D.VIII is on display at Wings of Freedom Aviation Museum, Horsham, Pennsylvania.
- A full scale flyable replica of an E.V (Fok.E.V. 153/18) is on the Czech civil register as OK-TAL 07. It is part of the collection of the Methodius Vlach Air Museum in Mladá Boleslav, Czech Republic.

== Specifications (D.VIII) ==
Fokker D.VIII 3-view drawing

Data from German Aircraft of the First World War

General characteristics

- Crew: 1
- Length: 5.86 m (19 ft 3 in)
- Wingspan: 8.34 m (27 ft 4 in)
- Height: 2.6 m (8 ft 6 in)
- Wing area: 10.7 m^{2} (115 sq ft)
- Empty weight: 405 kg (893 lb)
- Gross weight: 605 kg (1,334 lb)
- Powerplant: 1 × Oberursel UR.II 9-cyl. air-cooled rotary piston engine, 82 kW (110 hp)

Performance

- Maximum speed: 204 km/h (127 mph, 110 kn)
- Endurance: 1.5 hours
- Service ceiling: 6,000 m (20,000 ft)
- Rate of climb: 8 m/s (1,600 ft/min)
- Time to altitude: ** 1,000 m (3,300 ft) in 2 minutes
  - 4,000 m (13,000 ft) in 10 minutes 45 seconds
- Wing loading: 56.0 kg/m^{2} (11.5 lb/sq ft)

Armament

- Guns: 2 × 7.92 mm (0.312 in) Spandau MG08 machine guns

== See also ==
Related lists

- List of military aircraft of Germany

== Bibliography ==
- Gray, Peter & Thetford, Owen (1987) [1970]. German Aircraft of the First World War (2nd ed.). London: Putnam. ISBN 0-85177-809-7.
- Grosz, Peter M. (December 1981 – March 1982). "Fokker's D VIII... the Reluctant Razor". Air Enthusiast. No. 17. pp. 61–73. ISSN 0143-5450.
- Herris, Jack & Leckscheid, Jörn (2023). Fokker Aircraft of WWI: Volume 5 1918 Designs, Part 2 - D.VII & D.VIII: A Centennial Perspective on Great War Airplanes. Great War Aviation Centennial Series. Vol. 55B. n.p.: Aeronaut Books. ISBN 978-1-953201-61-4.
- Sankowski, Wojciech (September 1994). "Les Fokker E-V Polonais" [Polish Fokker E-Vs]. Avions: Toute l'aéronautique et son histoire (in French) (19): 18–19. ISSN 1243-8650.
- Weyl, A.R. Fokker: The Creative Years. 1988. ISBN 0-85177-817-8.
