= BMW IIIa =

First engine produced by Bayerische Motoren Werke AG

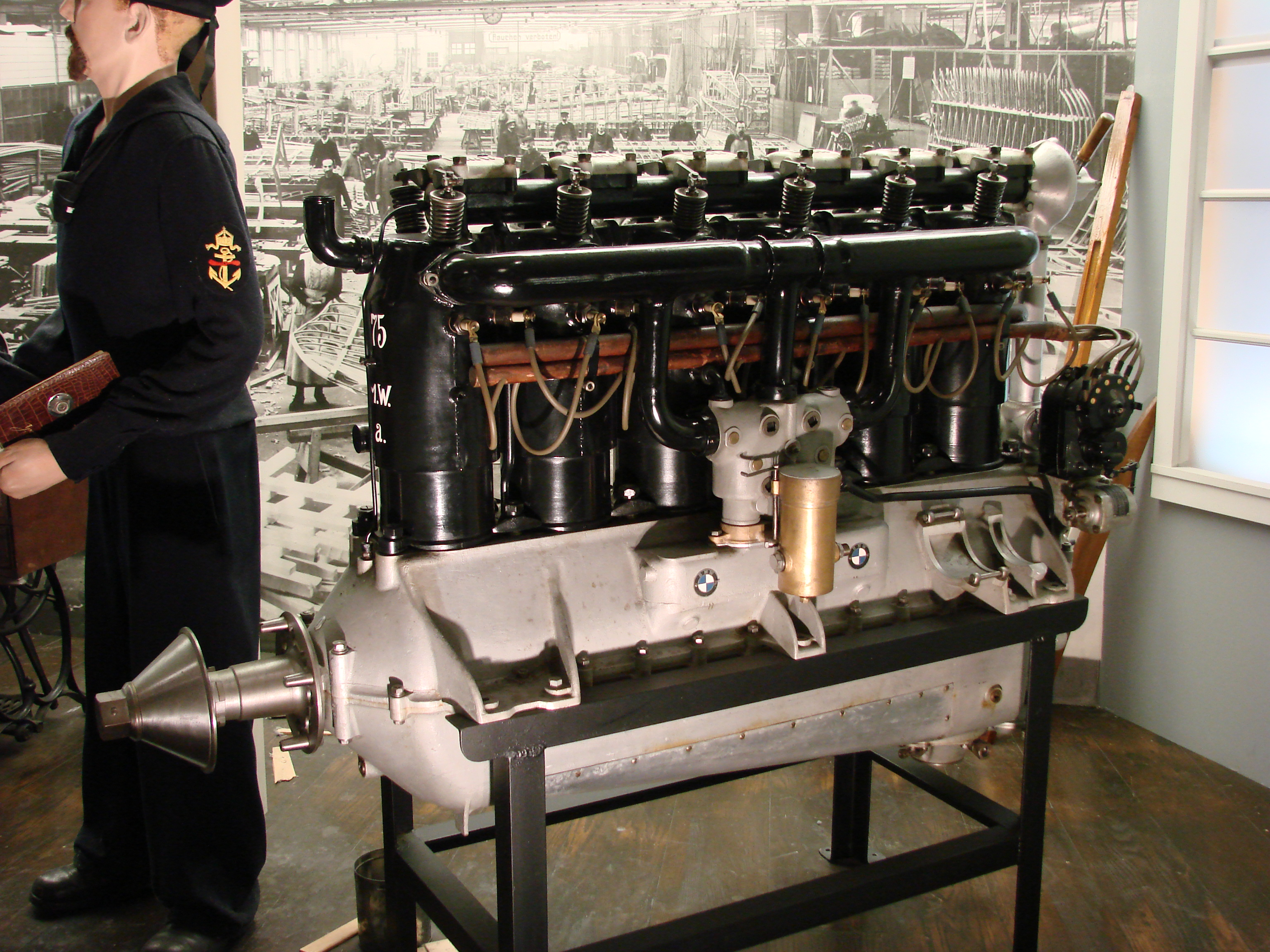
- The Smithsonian National Air and Space Museum's preserved BMW IIIa, shown with quick-change propeller hub
- Type: Inline engine
- Manufacturer: BMW
- First run: 1917
- Major applications: Fokker D.VII

BMW IIIa was an inline six-cylinder SOHC valvetrain, water-cooled aircraft engine, the first-ever engine produced by BMW, who, at the time, were exclusively an aircraft engine manufacturer. Its success laid the foundation for future BMW engine designs. It is best known as the powerplant of the Fokker D.VIIF, which outperformed any allied aircraft.

== Design and development ==
On 20 May 1917, Rapp Motorenwerke (which later that year became BMW GmbH) registered the documentation for the construction design for the new engine, dubbed BMW III. Designed by Max Friz and based on the Rapp III engine, it was an SOHC in-line six-cylinder, just as the earlier Mercedes D.III was, which guaranteed optimum balance, therefore few, small vibrations. It was designed with a high (for the era) compression ratio of 6.4:1. The first design drawings were available in May, and on 17 September the engine was on the test rig. After a successful maiden flight for the IIIa in December 1917, volume production started up at the beginning of 1918.

The military authorities were responsible for the fact that the first BMW product was designated with a III instead of an I. As early as 1915, the IdFlieg German military aviation inspectorate introduced uniform model designations for aero engines, with the Roman numeral referring to the performance class. IdFlieg's Class 0 (zero) engine power category was for engines of up to 100 bhp (75 kW), such as the Gnome Lambda-clone 80 hp (60 kW) Oberursel U.0 rotary engine, Class I was reserved for engines from 100 to 120 bhp (89 kW), with Class II for engines of between 120 and 150 hp (110 kW). The BMW engine was 185 bhp (138 kW) and was assigned to category III.

The engine was successful, but the real breakthrough came in 1917, when Friz integrated a basically simple throttle butterfly into the twin-barrel "high-altitude carburettor", enabling the engine to develop its full power high above the ground. Burning a special high octane fuel of gasoline blended with benzole, the carburettor adjusted the richness of the fuel-air mixture according to the aircraft's altitude. It enabled the engine, now dubbed BMW IIIa, to develop a constant 200 horsepower (150 kW) up to an altitude of 2000 meters – a decisive advantage over competitors' engines.

German and British horsepower ratings apparently differed. Postwar British tests put the rating of the BMW IIIa at 230 hp. This corresponds to British ratings of the Mercedes DIIIa engine being rated by the British as 180 hp (German rating of 170 hp) and the DIIIau at 200 hp (German-180 hp). This discrepancy may explain the significant difference in performance of the BMW IIIa equipped Fokker D.VIIF both against Mercedes powered D.VII's and their Allied opponents. The standard German Pferdstärke metric horsepower unit was expressed in the early 20th century as being a unit of almost exactly 735.5 watts, while the British unit for mechanical horsepower was based on the older 33,000 ft-lb/min figure, which translates to 745.7 watts instead.

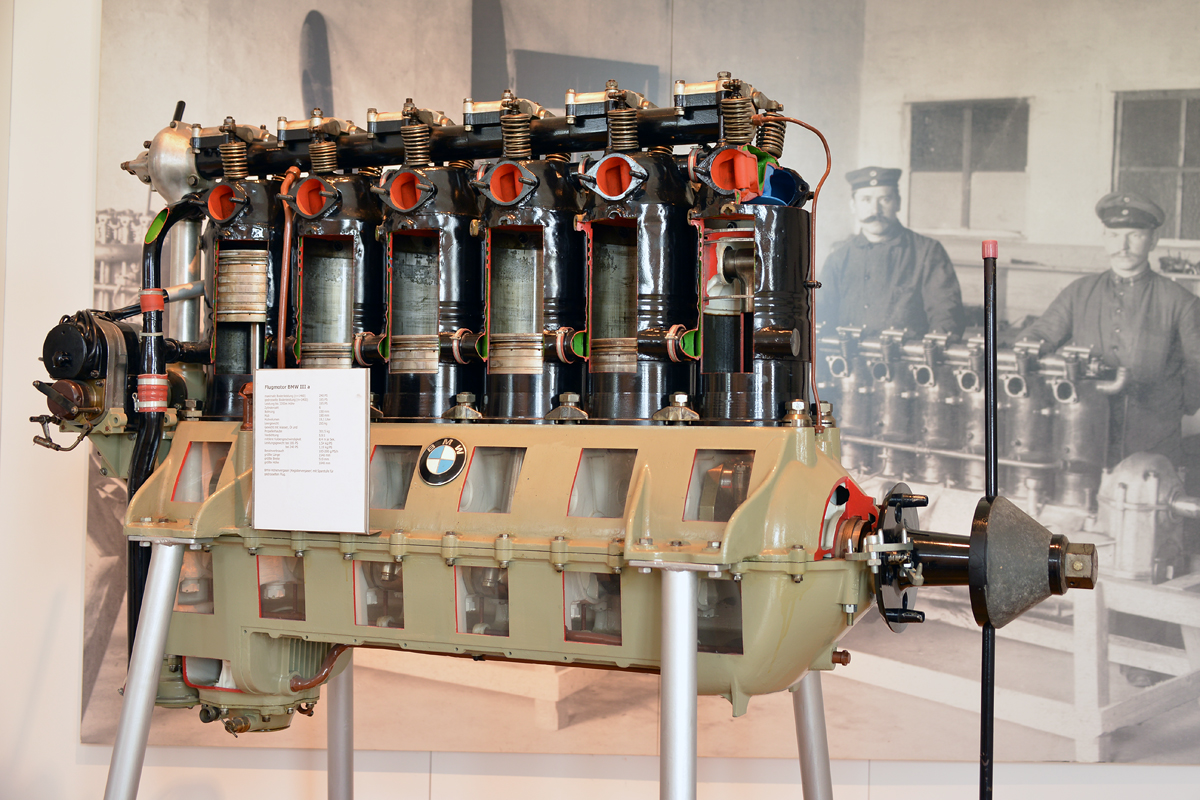
BMW IIIa at the Luftwaffenmuseum

The ability to gain power at higher altitudes was why this engine had unique superiority in air combat. It was primarily used in the Fokker D VII and in the Junkers Ju A 20 and Ju F 13. When equipped with the BMW IIIa engine, the Fokker D VII could outclimb any Allied opponent it encountered in combat. Highly maneuverable at all speeds and altitudes, it proved to be more than a match for any of the British or French fighter planes of 1918. The water-cooled in-line 6-cylinder engine's reputation grew very quickly after its abilities were proven in air combat by Jasta 11, the "Red Baron's" squadron. Ernst Udet, squadron leader of Jasta 11 in World War I, acknowledged the outstanding performance of the BMW IIIa engine:

There can be no doubt that the BMW engine was the absolute highlight in power unit development towards the end of the war. The only bad thing was that it came too late.

About 700 engines were built by BMW, however, a large demand for the new BMW IIIa aircraft engine in Munich (coupled with a lack of production capacity) caused part of the production to be transferred to the Opel factory in Rüsselsheim.

On September 13, 1919, Franz-Zeno Diemer set a world altitude record for a passenger aircraft (eight people on board, 6750 meters) in a Ju F 13 powered by a BMW IIIa aircraft engine.

== Applications ==
- Aero A.18
- Aero A.26
- Aero Ae 04
- Avia BH-3
- Fokker C.I
- Fokker D.VII
- Dobi-III
- Junkers D.I
- Junkers F.13
- Letov Š-3
- LFG Roland D.XV
- LFG Roland D.XVII
- TNCA Serie E

== Specifications (BMW IIIa) ==
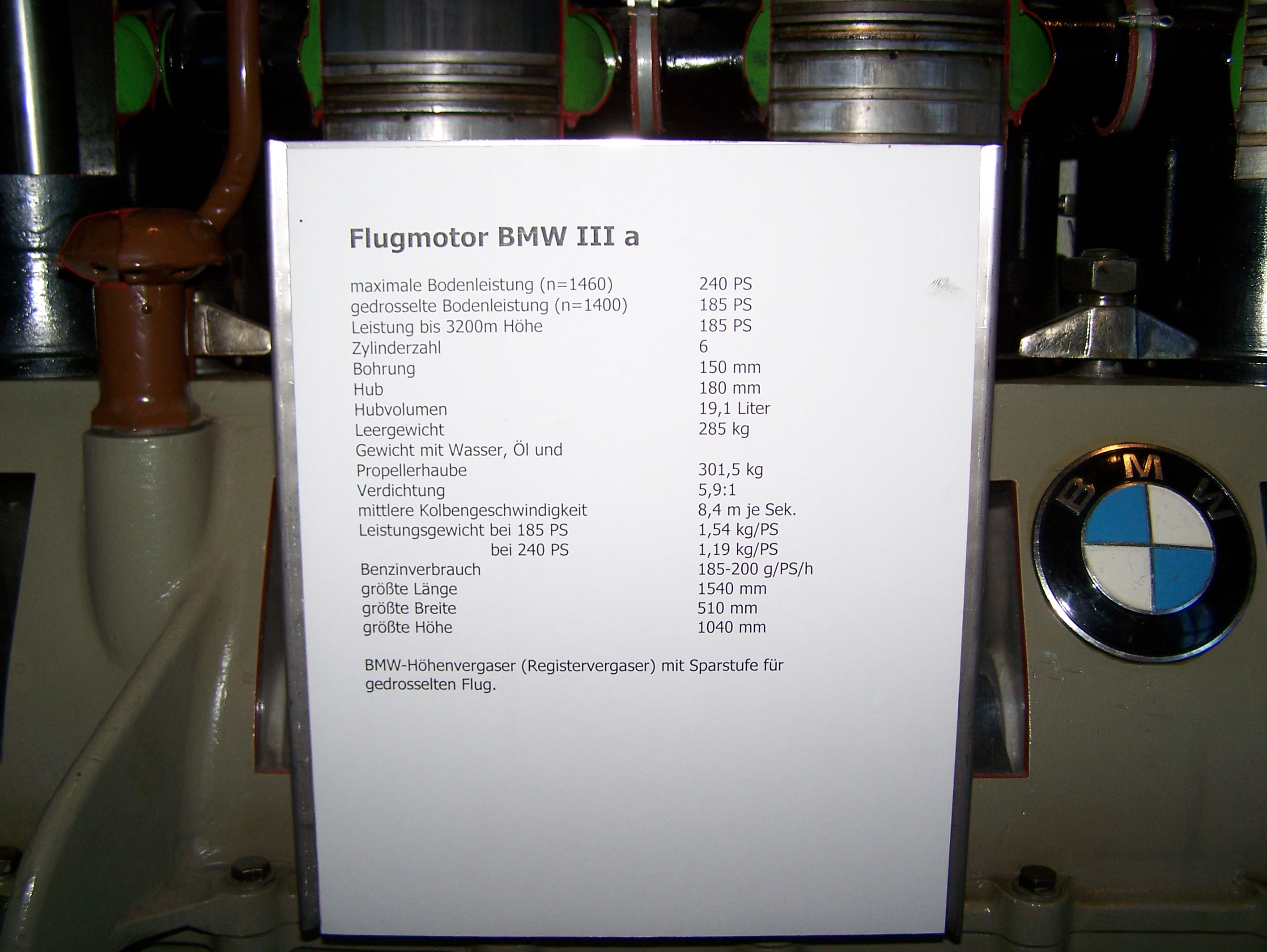
BMW IIIa specifications

Data from Smithsonian NASM BMW IIIa specifications

=== General characteristics ===
- Type: 6-cylinder, inline, water-cooled, piston engine
- Bore: 150 mm (5.9 in)
- Stroke: 180 mm (7.1 in)
- Displacement: 19.1 L (1,166 cu in)
- Length: 1,540 mm (60.63 in)
- Width: 510 mm (20 in)
- Height: 1,040 mm (41 in)
- Dry weight: 285 kg (628 lb)

=== Components ===
- Valvetrain: SOHC (single overhead camshaft)
- Fuel system: Two-barrel altitude compensating (to 2 km) carburetor
- Cooling system: Water-cooled

=== Performance ===
- Power output: 138 kW (185 hp) at 1,400 rpm
- Compression ratio: 6.4:1

== See also ==
- BMW IV
- Liberty L-6
- Mercedes D.III
- List of aircraft engines
