= Siemens-Schuckert D.IV =

1918 German fighter aircraft

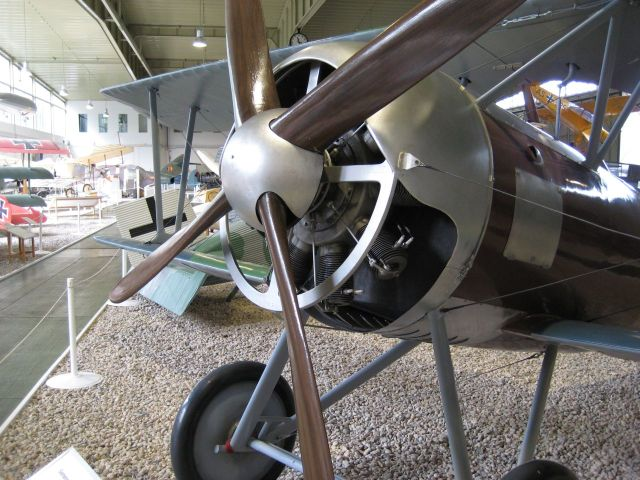
- Siemens-Schuckert D.III on display at the Luftwaffe Museum at Gatow

General information
- Type: Fighter aircraft
- National origin: Germany
- Manufacturer: Siemens-Schuckert
- Primary user: Germany
- Number built: 123 (by the end of the war)

History
- Introduction date: 1918
- First flight: 1918

The Siemens-Schuckert D.IV was a late-World War I fighter aircraft from Siemens-Schuckert (SSW). It reached service too late and was produced in too few numbers to have any effect on the war effort.

== Earlier designs ==
Siemens-Schuckert's first production fighter aircraft was the Siemens-Schuckert D.I, which was based closely on the French Nieuport 17. Apart from the use of the Siemens-Halske Sh.I, a geared rotary engine in which the crankshaft and the propeller rotated in opposite directions, the D.I was in fact a fairly close copy of the Nieuport. By the time production D.Is appeared in 1917 however, the design was no longer competitive and after 95 had been built, production was cancelled, with the type serving mainly as an advanced trainer.

Development work on the Siemens-Halske Sh.I culminated in the Siemens-Halske Sh.III, which developed 160 PS (120 kW; 160 hp). The new engine was fitted to a series of original prototype designs from the SSW works, the D.II, D.IIa and D.IIb. These featured a short, round section fuselage designed to fit a larger engine, leading to a rather stubby-looking aircraft which pilots later referred to as the flying beer barrel. Flight tests started in June 1917, and while the aircraft did not have a very high top speed, they showed outstanding rates of climb. The only serious concern was the extremely long landing gear needed to keep the huge 2-bladed prop clear of the ground.

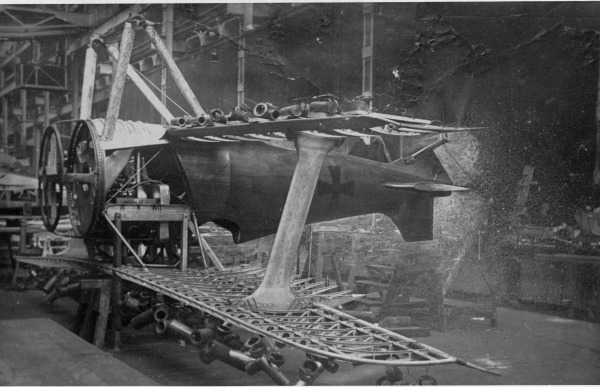
D.IIe undergoing stress testing

== D.III ==
Three more prototypes were ordered, one D.IIe, with the original sized wings, and two D.IIc's, fitted with shorter and longer span wings. After completion in October 1917, the design proved promising and in December an order for twenty long-span D.IIc's was placed with a smaller 4-bladed propeller that allowed for shorter landing gear legs. Deliveries of these aircraft, now known as D.III, began in January and were followed by an additional order for thirty in February.

All fifty were delivered to front-line units in May, where they proved popular but after only 10 hours of service the engines started showing serious problems, overheating and seizing. Siemens blamed the problem on the Voltol-based oil that was used to replace scarce castor oil for lubricating the engine but the type was withdrawn from service and replaced by Fokker D.VIIs. When they were removed, Rudolf Berthold, commander of JG.II, noted that he wished "the Siemens fighter be made available again for front-line use as quickly as possible for, after elimination of the present faults, it is likely to become one of our most useful fighter aircraft".

A version of the Sh.III passed a 40-hour endurance test in June and the aircraft were cleared to return to service in July. In the meantime they had been upgraded with the addition of a new rudder, balanced ailerons and had the cowling cut-away for improved cooling. Some sources also claim that the original engines were replaced with the improved 200 PS (150 kW; 200 hp) Sh.IIIa engines. Another thirty new aircraft with these features were built and all eighty of the improved design entered service in home defense units where their climb rate made them excellent interceptors.

== D.IV ==
The short-span D.IIc prototype had been further refined and with a narrower 1.00 m (3 ft 3 in) chord upper and lower wing, using the Göttingen 180 airfoil. One wing was slightly longer than the other to counter the P-factor of its huge four-blade propeller. The port panels outboard of the struts were 1,110 mm (44 in) in length, while those on the starboard side were 1,040 mm (41 in) long. The performance improved noticeably in top speed and in climb rate over the D.III. An order for this model, now known as the D.IV, was placed in March 1918 and additional orders were placed as the qualities of the design became known. Aircraft started reaching operational units in August but of the 280 ordered only 123 were completed by the end of the war, about half of those reaching operational units.

Although the short landing gear and limited prop clearance led to tricky landing, the plane was otherwise easy to fly. It had a very short take-off run and at heights above 4,000 m (13,000 ft) was faster and more manoeuvrable than the Mercedes-powered Fokker D.VII. Its most notable feature was its phenomenal rate of climb and extremely high service ceiling—it could reach 6,000 m (20,000 ft) in under 14 1/2 minutes. In 36 minutes it could reach 8,100 m (26,600 ft), about 1,200 m (3,900 ft) higher than the ceiling of the Fokker. Production of the D.IV continued after the cease-fire, while one example escaped to Switzerland where it operated from 1918 to 1922, and another was acquired by the Lithuanians, however it never flew in their service. One examples was used by the Belgians, being marked with the race number 22. With the signing of the Treaty of Versailles aircraft production in Germany was outlawed and the aircraft division of SSW disappeared. Siemens-Halske later reorganized into Bramo.

== D.V ==
In May/June 1918 a sesquiplane, two bay derivative, the D.V participated in the Adlershof trials. Three were built.

== Replicas ==
No complete Siemen-Schuckerts survive however a couple of replicas have been constructed.

One notable example is an airworthy D.IV replica built by Carl Swanson. It is powered by a 160hp rotary Gnome Monosoupape 9. Its first flight was in 1981 in the hands of Jerry Thornhill. It was displayed at various museums in the USA including Planes of Fame Air Museum until 2019 when it was acquired by the NZ Warbirds Association and shipped to its current location at Ardmore Airport, Auckland, New Zealand.

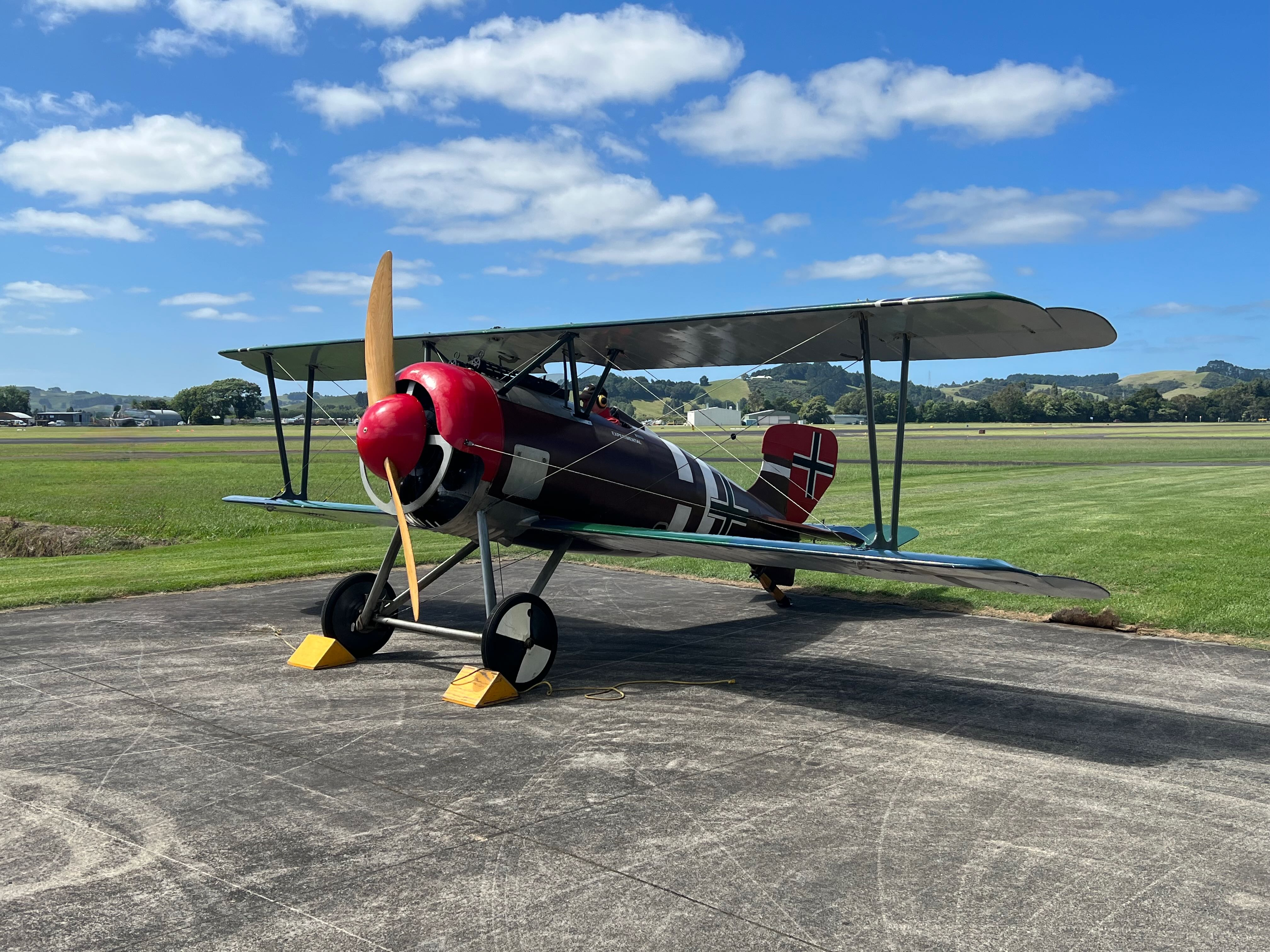
Siemens-Schuckert DIV replica ZK-SSW at NZ Warbirds Association, Ardmore Airport, New Zealand

== Operators ==
Belgium

- Belgian Air Force - operated 1 ex-Luftstreitkräfte D.IV from 1919 to 1921

German Empire

- Luftstreitkräfte
- Kaiserliche Marine

Lithuania

- Lithuanian Air Force - received 1 D.IV (No. 6177); however, it never flew in Lithuanian service.

Switzerland

- Swiss Air Force - operated 1 ex-Luftstreitkräfte D.III from 1918 to 1922.

== Specifications (D.IV) ==
Data from German Aircraft of the First World War

General characteristics

- Crew: 1
- Length: 5.7 m (18 ft 8 in)
- Wingspan: 8.35 m (27 ft 5 in)
- Height: 2.72 m (8 ft 11 in)
- Wing area: 15.1 m^{2} (163 sq ft)
- Airfoil: Göttingen 180
- Empty weight: 540 kg (1,190 lb)
- Gross weight: 735 kg (1,620 lb)
- Powerplant: 1 × Siemens-Halske Sh.III 11-cylinder air-cooled geared rotary piston engine 160 PS (157.8 hp; 117.7 kW)
- Propellers: 4-bladed fixed-pitch wooden propeller

Performance

- Maximum speed: 190 km/h (120 mph, 100 kn)
- Range: 380 km (240 mi, 210 nmi)
- Endurance: 2 hours
- Service ceiling: 8,000 m (26,000 ft)
- Time to altitude:

1,000 m (3,300 ft) in 1 minute 54 seconds
6,000 m (20,000 ft) in 15 minutes 30 seconds

- Wing loading: 48.7 kg/m^{2} (10.0 lb/sq ft)
- Power/mass: 0.16 kW/kg (0.097 hp/lb)

Armament

- Guns: 2 × 7.92 mm (0.31 in) LMG 08/15 machine guns
