= Zeppelin-Lindau D.I =

1918 WW1 German stressed-skin semi-monocoque strutless fighter biplane

D.I
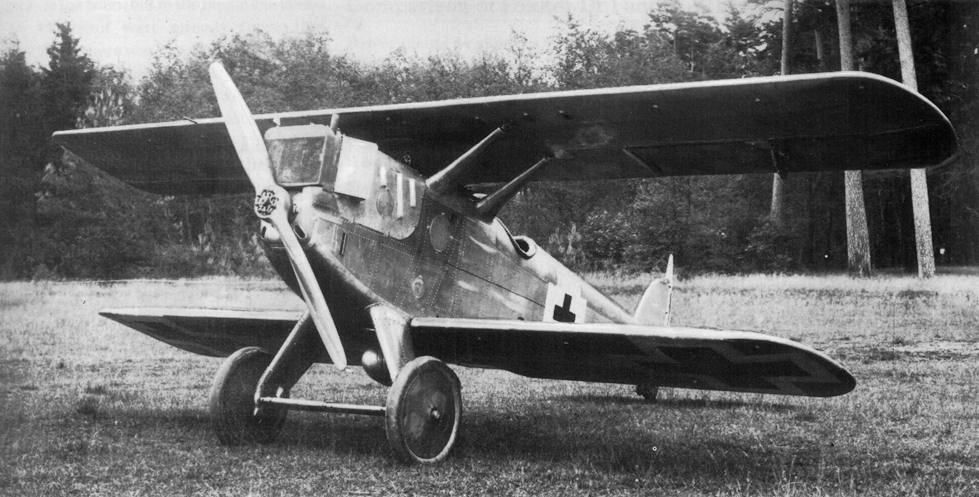

General information
- Type: Single-seat fighter
- National origin: Germany
- Manufacturer: Zeppelin-Lindau
- Designer: Claude Dornier
- Status: Work stopped on production examples
- Primary user: Luftstreitkräfte
- Number built: 7

History
- First flight: 4 June 1918
- Developed into: Dornier Do H Falke

The Zeppelin D.I, or Zeppelin-Lindau D.I or Zeppelin D.I (Do), as named in German documents, also sometimes referred to postwar as the Dornier D.I or Dornier-Zeppelin D.I, for the designer, was a single-seat all-metal stressed skin monocoque cantilever-wing biplane fighter, developed by Claude Dornier while working for Luftschiffbau Zeppelin at their Lindau facility. It was too late to see operational service with the German Air Force (Luftstreitkräfte) during World War I.

== Development and design ==
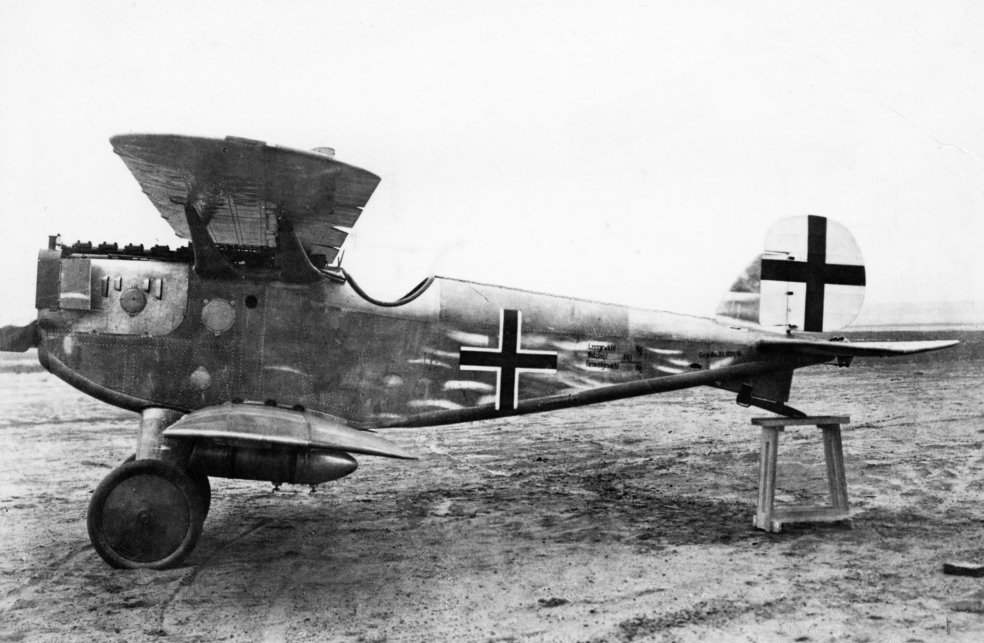
Zeppelin-Lindau (Dornier) D.I on trestle

The Dornier D.I was one of several designs by Claude Dornier to have an all-metal stressed skin monocoque structure, and it was the first fighter to feature such construction and although production was halted prior to the completion of any production versions, it was also the first aircraft with these features to go into production. To reduce the hazards of inflight fires it also had an external fuel tank which may have been jettisonable, according to some sources and thick-section cantilever wings for improved aerodynamics. The Dornier Do H Falke monoplane was developed from it with an enlarged upper wing compensating for the removal of the lower wing.

== Operational history ==
Seven prototypes were built but this design was never used operationally in World War I. Luftstreitkräfte (German Air Force) pilots evaluated the type in May and June 1918 and again in October. German ace Wilhelm Reinhard was killed on 3 July 1918 after a structural failure when it was supposed to have been grounded for structural improvements. There were reports of heavy aileron controls and poor climb rates at altitude. After being fitted with a more powerful BMW IIIa inline-six liquid-cooled engine that reduced the time needed to rate to reach 5,000 m (16,000 ft) from 25 minutes to 13 minutes, an order was placed for 50 aircraft either in October or November. These were roughly 50 percent complete when production was halted following the armistice in early 1919. One example went to the US Navy and another to the US Army Air Service, both purchased in 1921 and delivered in 1922, for evaluation of the novel construction methods used.

== Operators ==
German Empire

- Luftstreitkräfte - evaluation only

United States

- United States Navy - one example for evaluation, serialed A6058
- United States Air Service - one example for evaluation, serialed AS.68546, McCook Field Project Number P.241

== Specifications (BMW engine) ==
Data from Kössler, 1985, p.78

General characteristics

- Crew: One
- Length: 6.37 m (20 ft 11 in)
- Upper wingspan: 7.8 m (25 ft 7 in)
- Upper Wing chord: 1.4 m (4 ft 7 in)
- Lower wingspan: 6.5 m (21 ft 4 in)
- Height: 2.6 m (8 ft 6 in)
- Wing area: 18.7 m^{2} (201 sq ft)
- Empty weight: 725 kg (1,598 lb)
- Gross weight: 885 kg (1,951 lb)
- Powerplant: 1 × BMW IIIa water-cooled 6-cylinder inline engine, 138 kW (185 hp)
- Propellers: 2-bladed Axial, 2.7 m (8 ft 10 in) diameter fixed pitch wood propeller

Performance

- Maximum speed: 200 km/h (120 mph, 110 kn) at sea level
- Service ceiling: 8,100 m (26,600 ft)
- Time to altitude: 13 minutes to 5,000 m (16,000 ft)

Armament

- 2 × 7.92 mm (0.312 in) fixed forward-firing LMG 08/15 Spandau machine guns

== See also ==
Related development

- Dornier-Zeppelin C.II - two-seater with conventional wings but similar fuselage and developed roughly in parallel.
- Dornier Do H Falke

Aircraft of comparable role, configuration, and era

- Fokker D.VII
- Junkers D.I (all metal fighter but not a monocoque)
- LFG Roland D.XV
- Pfalz D.XII
- Short Silver Streak (similar only in also having an early stressed skin monocoque structure)

Related lists

- List of fighter aircraft
- Idflieg aircraft designation system
- List of military aircraft of the Central Powers in World War I
