= Air commanders of World War I =

The air commanders of World War I were army or navy officers who came to command air services during the first major conflict in which air power played a significant role.

== Entente Powers air commanders ==
=== British Empire ===
==== Australian Flying Corps ====
- 1914–1919 – Lieutenant Colonel Edgar Reynolds, General Staff Officer for Aviation, Australian Imperial Force
- 1918 - Lieutenant Colonel Richard Williams, Officer Commanding (Acting) RAF Palestine Brigade

==== Royal Flying Corps ====
===== Director-General of Military Aeronautics =====
- 1914–1917 – Lieutenant-General Sir David Henderson
- 1917–1918 – Major-General John Salmond
- 1918 – Brigadier-General Edward Ellington

===== General Officer Commanding the RFC in France =====
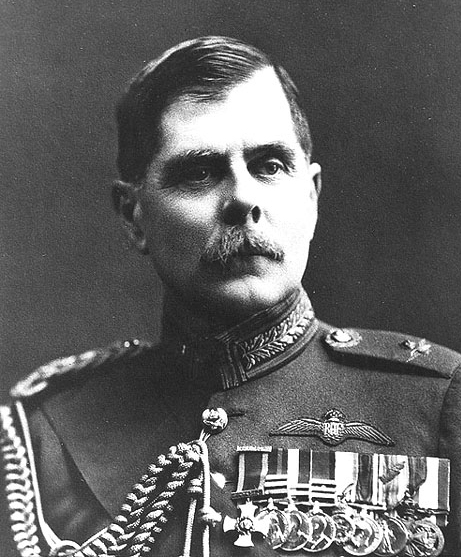
Major-General Hugh Trenchard

- 1914–1915 – Major-General Sir David Henderson
- 1915–1918 – Major-General Hugh Trenchard
- 1918 – Major-General John Salmond

==== Royal Naval Air Service ====
===== Heads of the RNAS =====
- 1914–1915 – Captain Murray Sueter, Director of the Admiralty Air Department
- 1915–1917 – Rear Admiral Charles Vaughan-Lee, Director of the Admiralty Air Department
- 1917–1918 – Commodore Godfrey Paine, Fifth Sea Lord and Director of Naval Aviation

==== Royal Air Force ====
===== Chief of the Air Staff =====
- 1918 – Major-General Sir Hugh Trenchard
- 1918 – Major-General Frederick Sykes

=== France ===
==== Director of Military Aeronautics ====
- 1914–1915 Brigadier General Auguste Edouard Hirschauer
- position vacant
- 1916 Henry Jacques Regnier

==== Head of the Service Aéronautique ====
- to December 1916 Colonel Édouard Barès
- December 1916 to August 1917 Commandant Paul du Peuty
- August 1917 to __ Colonel Charles Duval

=== Greece ===
- Hellenic Naval Air Service: Lt Commander Aristeidis Moraitinis (1917–1918)

=== Imperial Russia ===
- Grand Duke Alexander Mikhailovich, Field Inspector General of the Imperial Russian Air Service
- General Alexander von Kaulbars (Head of Russian Aviation in the Field, 1914-1915)
- Colonel Sergey Oulianine (Head of the Directorate of the Air Force, 1917-1918)

=== Italy ===
- Maurizio Moris, General Director for Aeronautics (1915)
- Giovanni Battista Marieni (1915–1917)
- Luigi Bongiovanni (1918–1919)

=== Romania ===
==== General Inspector of Engineering and Aeronautics ====
- 1913-1915 - General Mihail Boteanu

==== Commander of the RAC ====
- 1915-1916; 1918-1920 - Brigadier General Constantin Găvănescu
- 1916 - Major Gheorghe Rujinschi
- 1916-1918 - Major De Malherbe

==== Director of the Aeronautics ====
- 1916-1918 - Lieutenant-colonel François de Vergnette de Lamotte
- 1918-1920 - Brigadier General Constantin Găvănescu

=== United States ===
==== Chief of Air Service of the American Expeditionary Force in France ====
- 30 June 1917 - Lieutenant-Colonel William L. Mitchell
- 3 September 1917 - Brigadier-General William L. Kenly
- 27 November 1917 - Brigadier-General Benjamin Foulois
- 29 May 1918 - Major-General Mason Patrick

==== Air Commander, Zone of Advance on the American Expeditionary Force in France ====
- Brigadier-General Billy Mitchell

== Central Powers air commanders ==
=== Germany ===
- Führer der Luftschiffe (Admiral 2nd Class) Peter Strasser, Commander of naval Airships (1915–1918)
- Major, later Lieutenant-Colonel and then Colonel, Hermann von der Lieth-Thomsen, Chief of Field Air Services (1915–1916), Air Service Chief of Staff (1916–1919)
- Lieutenant-General Ernst von Hoeppner, Commanding General of the Air Service (1916–1919)

==== Inspector of Flying Troops ====
- Colonel Walter von Eberhardt, Inspector of Flying Troops (1913–1914)
- Major Richard Roethe, Inspector of Flying Troops (1914–1916)
- Major, later Lieutenant-Colonel Wilhelm Siegert, 2nd Staff Officer of Field Air Services (1915–1916), Inspector of Flying Troops (1916–1918)
- Captain Wilhelm Haehnelt, Air Commander 5th Army (1915–1916), Air Commander 1st Army (1916–1918), Inspector of Flying Troops (1918–1919)

=== Austro-Hungarian Empire ===
- Colonel, later Major General Emil Uzelac, Commander of the Austro-Hungarian Imperial and Royal Aviation Troops (1912–1918)
- Colonel General Archduke Josef Ferdinand, Inspector General of the Imperial Air Force (1917–1918)
