= Air force =

Military branch that primarily conducts aerial warfare

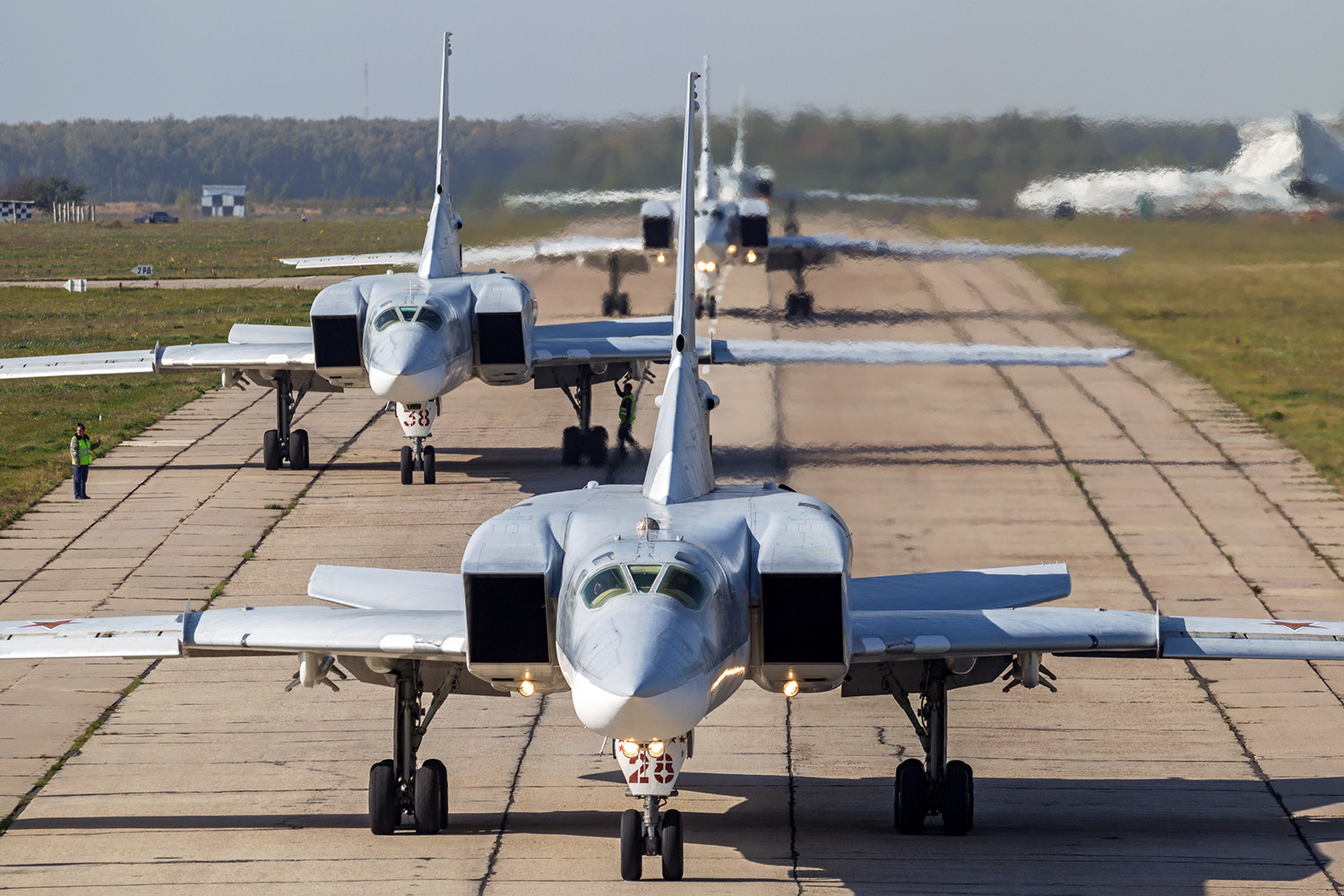
Tupolev Tu-22M3 of the Russian Air Force

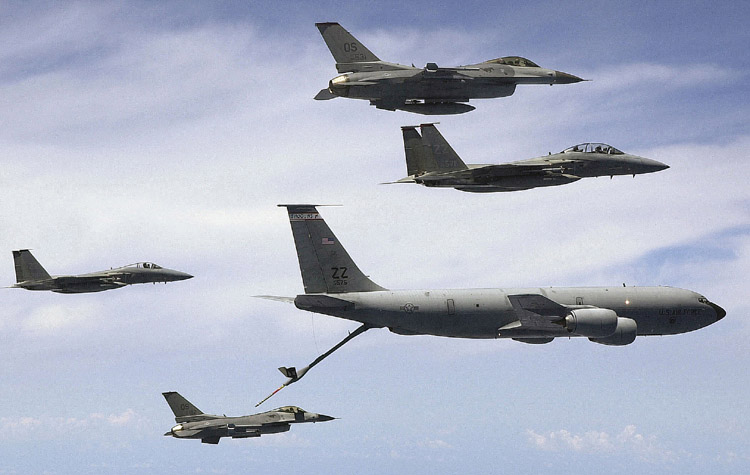
Four fighters (F-15 and F-16) and a KC-135 of the USAF

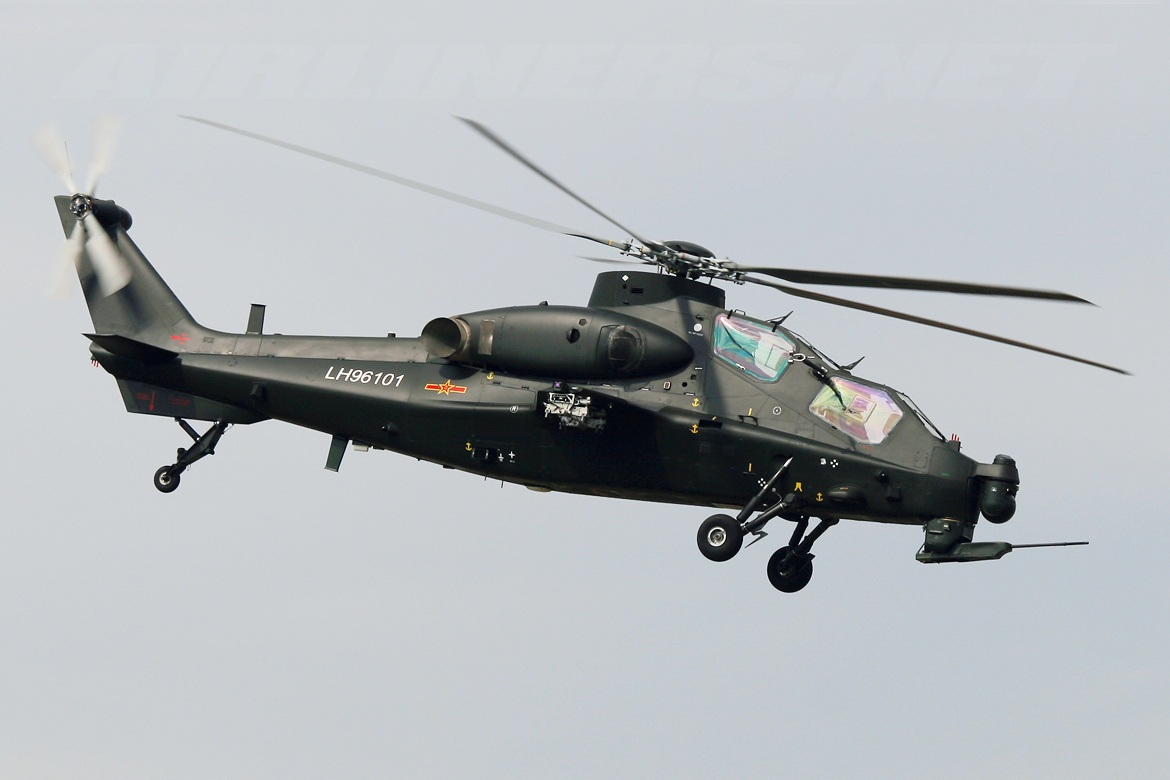
Changhe Z-10 of the PLA Air Force

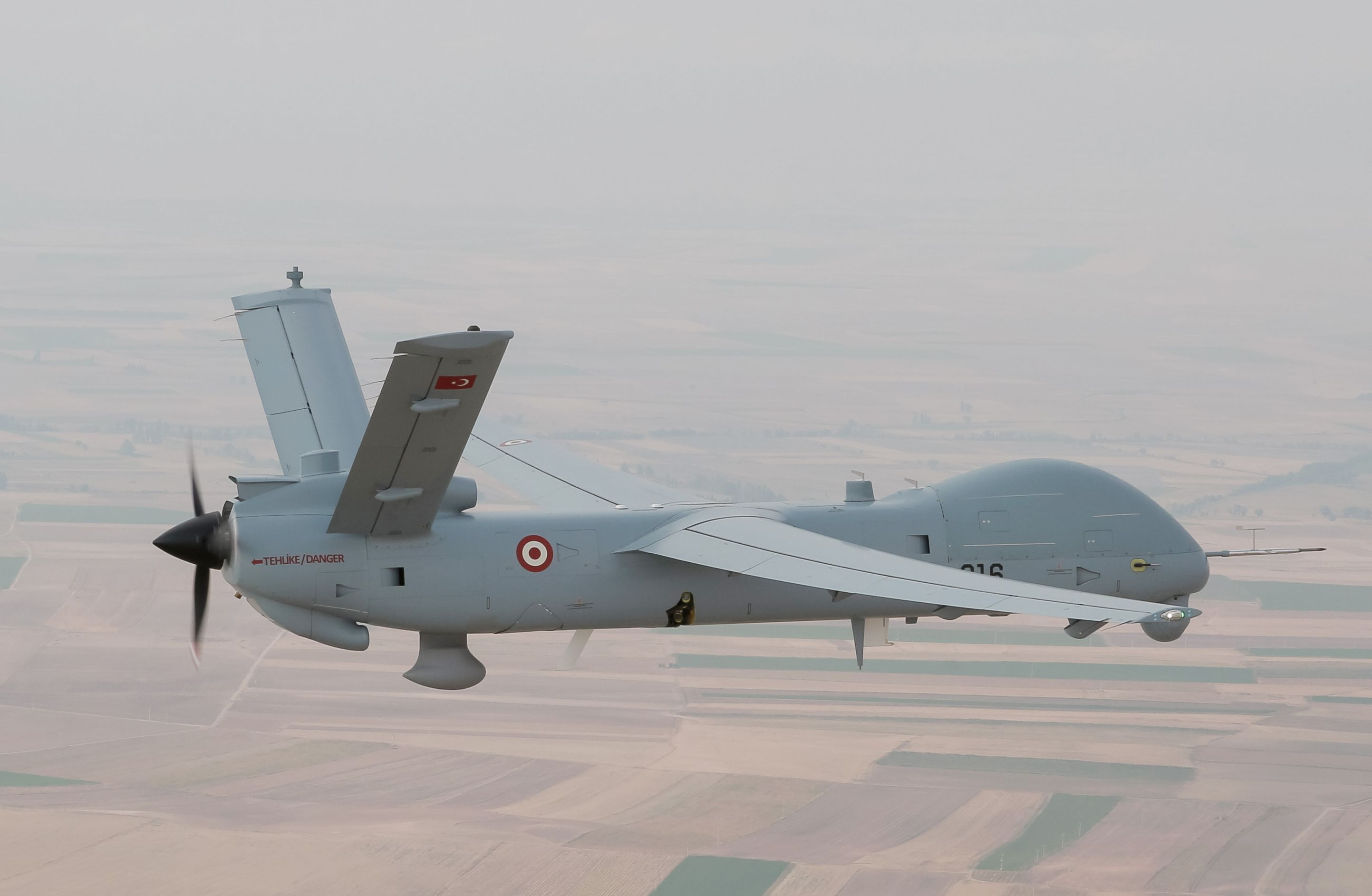
TAI Anka of the Turkish Air Force

An air force is the national military branch that primarily conducts aerial warfare. More specifically, it is the branch of a nation's armed services that is responsible for aerial warfare as distinct from an army aviation or naval aviation units. Typically, air forces are responsible for gaining control of the air, carrying out strategic and tactical bombing missions, and providing support to land and naval forces often in the form of aerial reconnaissance and close air support.

The term air force may also refer to a tactical air force or numbered air force, which is an operational formation either within a national air force or comprising several air components from allied nations. Air forces typically consist of a combination of fighters, bombers, helicopters, transport planes and other aircraft.

Many air forces may command and control other air defence forces assets such as anti-aircraft artillery, surface-to-air missiles, or anti-ballistic missile warning networks and defensive systems. Some air forces are also responsible for operations of the military space and intercontinental ballistic missiles (ICBM). Some nations, principally countries who modelled their militaries along Soviet lines, have or had an air defence force which is organizationally separate from their air force.

Peacetime/non-wartime activities of air forces may include air policing and air-sea rescue.

Air forces are not just composed of pilots, but also rely on a significant amount of support from other personnel to operate. Logistics, security, intelligence, special operations, cyber space support, maintenance, weapons loaders, and many other specialties are required by all air forces.

== History ==
=== Heavier-than-air military aircraft ===
The first aviation force in the world was the Aviation Military of the French Army formed in 1910, which eventually became l'Armée de l'Air. In 1911, during the Italo-Turkish War, Italy employed aircraft for the first time ever in the world for reconnaissance and bombing missions against Turkish positions on Libyan Territory. This was the first war in history that featured air attacks by airplanes and dirigible airships. During World War I France, Germany, Italy, the British Empire and the Ottoman Empire all possessed significant forces of bombers and fighters. Aviation in World War I also saw the appearance of senior commanders who directed aerial warfare and numerous flying aces.

=== Independent air forces ===
An independent air force is one which is a separate branch of a nation's armed forces and is, at least nominally, treated as a military service on par with that of older services like navies or armies.

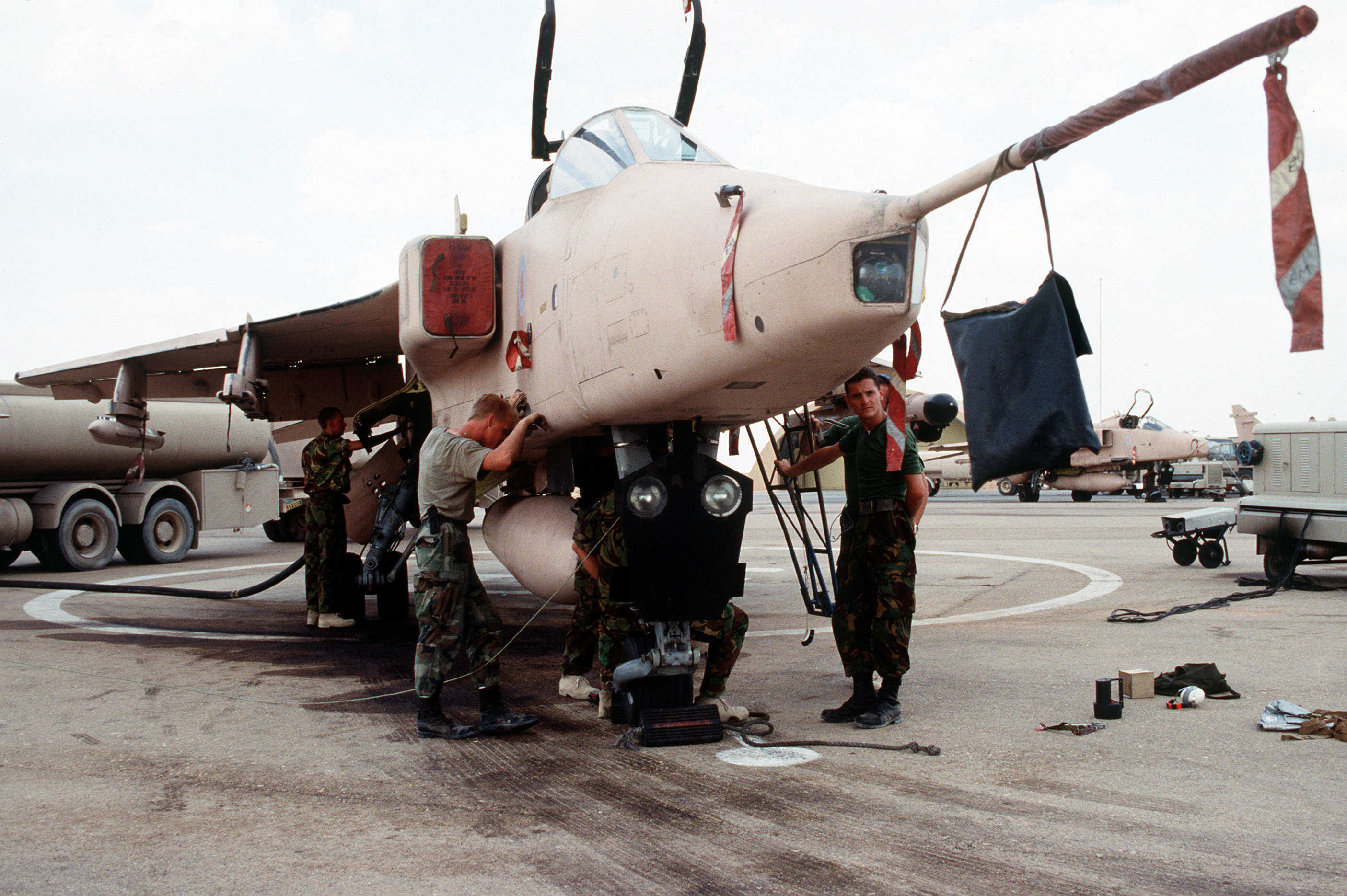
Refueling a Jaguar GR1 of the Royal Air Force

The British Royal Air Force was the first independent air force in the world. The RAF was founded on 1 April 1918 by amalgamation the British Army's Royal Flying Corps and the Royal Naval Air Service. At its inception, the RAF comprised over 20,000 aircraft. It was commanded by a Chief of the Air Staff with the rank of major-general and was governed by its own government ministry (the Air Ministry).

Arguably, the Finnish Air Force was the first independent air force in the world, formed on 6 March 1918, when the Swedish count, Eric von Rosen gave Finland the second aircraft, a Thulin Typ D. Some considered that the Finnish Air Force did not officially exist during the Finnish Civil War (27 January – 15 May 1918), and the Red Guards had its own air force.

Over the following decades, most countries with substantial military capability established independent air forces. The South African Air Force was formed on 1 February 1920 and the Royal Australian Air Force was formed shortly thereafter, on 31 March 1921, although it was not until 1922 that the head of the Service was titled as Chief of the Air Staff, placing him on a par with his Australian Army and Navy counterparts. The Canadian Air Force was formed at the end of World War I and was abolished and reorganized several times between 1918 and 1924. It became the permanent Royal Canadian Air Force when it received the Royal title by royal proclamation on 1 April 1924. It did not however become independent of the Canadian Army until 1938, when its head was also designated as Chief of the Air Staff. Similarly, the Royal New Zealand Air Force was established in 1923 as the New Zealand Permanent Air Force, but did not become independent of the New Zealand Army until 1937. The Royal Indian Air Force was also formed on 8 October 1932. Other British-influenced countries also established independent air forces. For example, the Royal Egyptian Air Force was created in 1937, when Egyptian military aviation was separated from Army command. The Afghan Air Force was established on 22 August 1924, with support from the Soviet Union and Great Britain, but a civil war destroyed most of the planes and it was not reestablished until 1937, when King Mohammed Nadir Shah took power.

Outside of the British Empire, the Italian Royal Air Force was founded in 1923, the Romanian Air Force was established as a force category on 1 January 1924, the Finnish Air Force was established as a separate service on 4 May 1928, the Chilean Air Force was founded in 1930 and the Brazilian Air Force was created in 1941. Both the United States Air Force and the Philippine Air Force were formed as a separate branches of their respective armed forces in 1947, as did the Argentine Air Force in 1945. The Israeli Air Force came into being with the State of Israel on 18 May 1948, but evolved from the pre-existing Sherut Avir (Air Service) of the Haganah paramilitary. The Japan Air Self-Defense Force was not established until 1954; in World War II Japanese military aviation had been carried out by the Army and Navy. Unlike all these countries, the Mexican Air Force remains an integral part of the Mexican Army.

=== The world wars ===
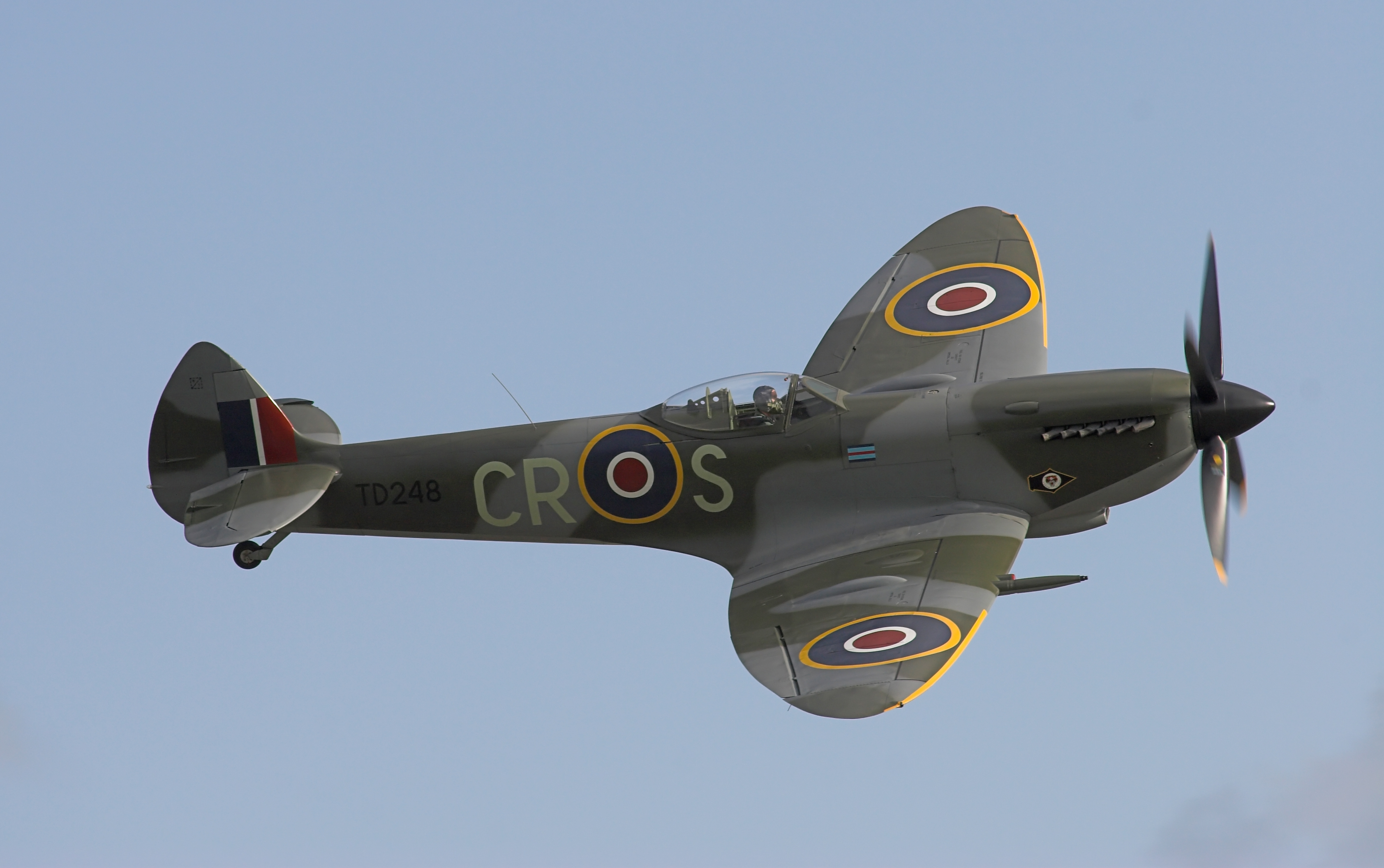
RAF Supermarine Spitfire played a vital role in British victory during the Battle of Britain.

==== World War I ====
Germany was the first country to organize regular air attacks on enemy infrastructure with the Luftstreitkräfte. In World War I, its zeppelins (airships) dropped bombs on British cities. British warplanes mostly spotted for artillery and fought German planes, British airships were less advanced than the zeppelins and mostly hunted for German U-boats (submarines).

Fixed-wing aircraft at the time were quite primitive, being able to achieve velocities comparable to that of modern automobiles and mounting minimal weaponry and equipment. Aerial services were still largely a new venture, and relatively unreliable machines and limited training resulted in stupendously low life expectancies for early military aviators.

==== World War II ====
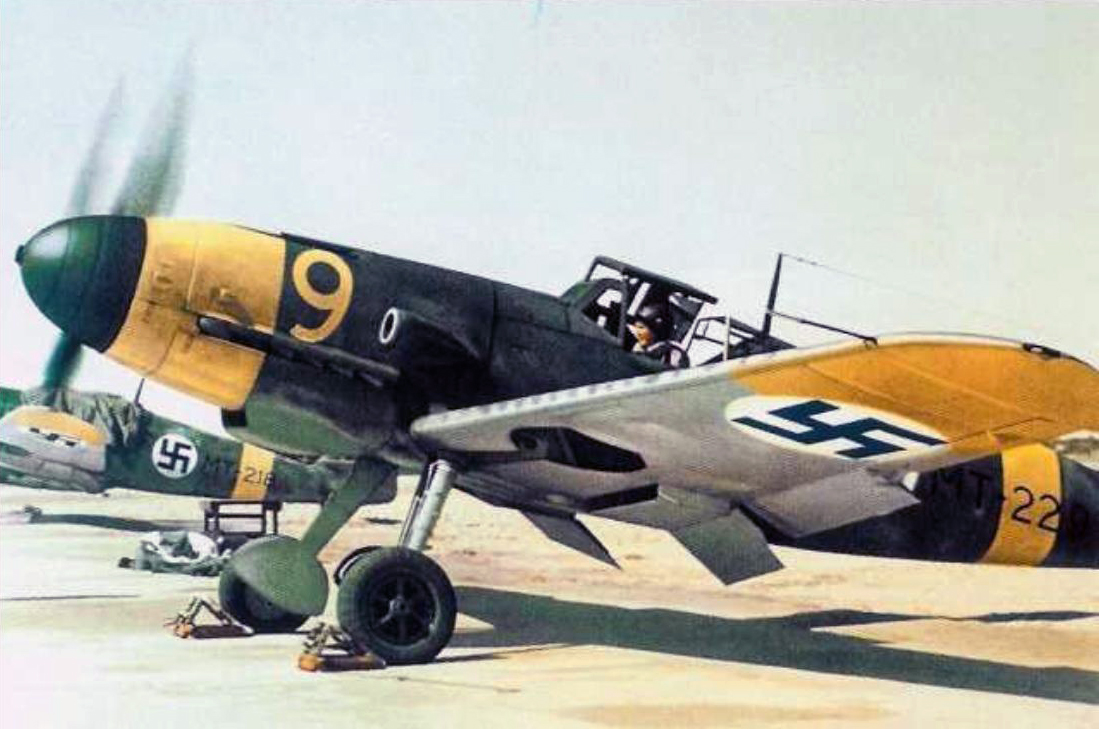
Finnish Messerschmitt Bf 109 G-2 aircraft of the Finnish Air Force during the Continuation War

By the time World War II began, planes had become much safer, faster, and more reliable. They were adopted as standard for bombing raids and taking out other aircraft because they were much faster than airships. The world's largest military Air Force by the start of the Second World War in 1939 was the Soviet Red Air Force, and although much depleted, it would stage the largest air operations of WWII over the four years of combat with the German Luftwaffe.

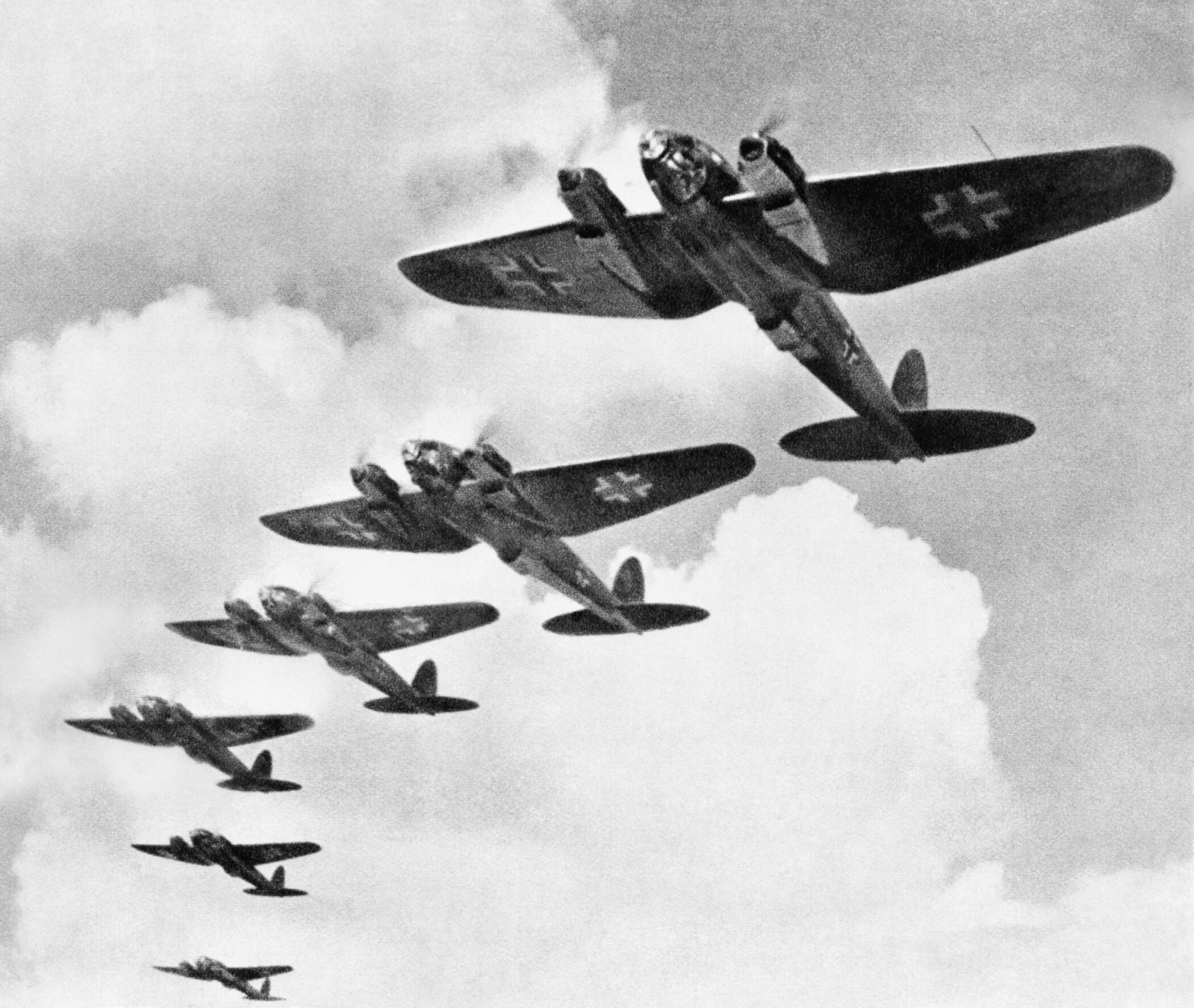
German Heinkel He 111 bombers during the Battle of Britain

Arguably the war's most important air operation, known as the Battle of Britain, took place during 1940 over Britain and the English Channel between Britain's Royal Air Force and Germany's Luftwaffe over a period of several months. In the end Britain emerged victorious, and this caused Adolf Hitler to give up his plan to invade Britain. Other prominent air force operations during the Second World War include the Allied bombing of Germany during 1942–1944, and the Red Air Force operations in support of strategic ground offensives on the Eastern Front. The aerial warfare in Pacific Ocean theatre was of a comparable strategic significance to the Battle of Britain but was largely conducted by the US and Japanese naval aviation services and not by air forces.

=== Strategic bombing ===
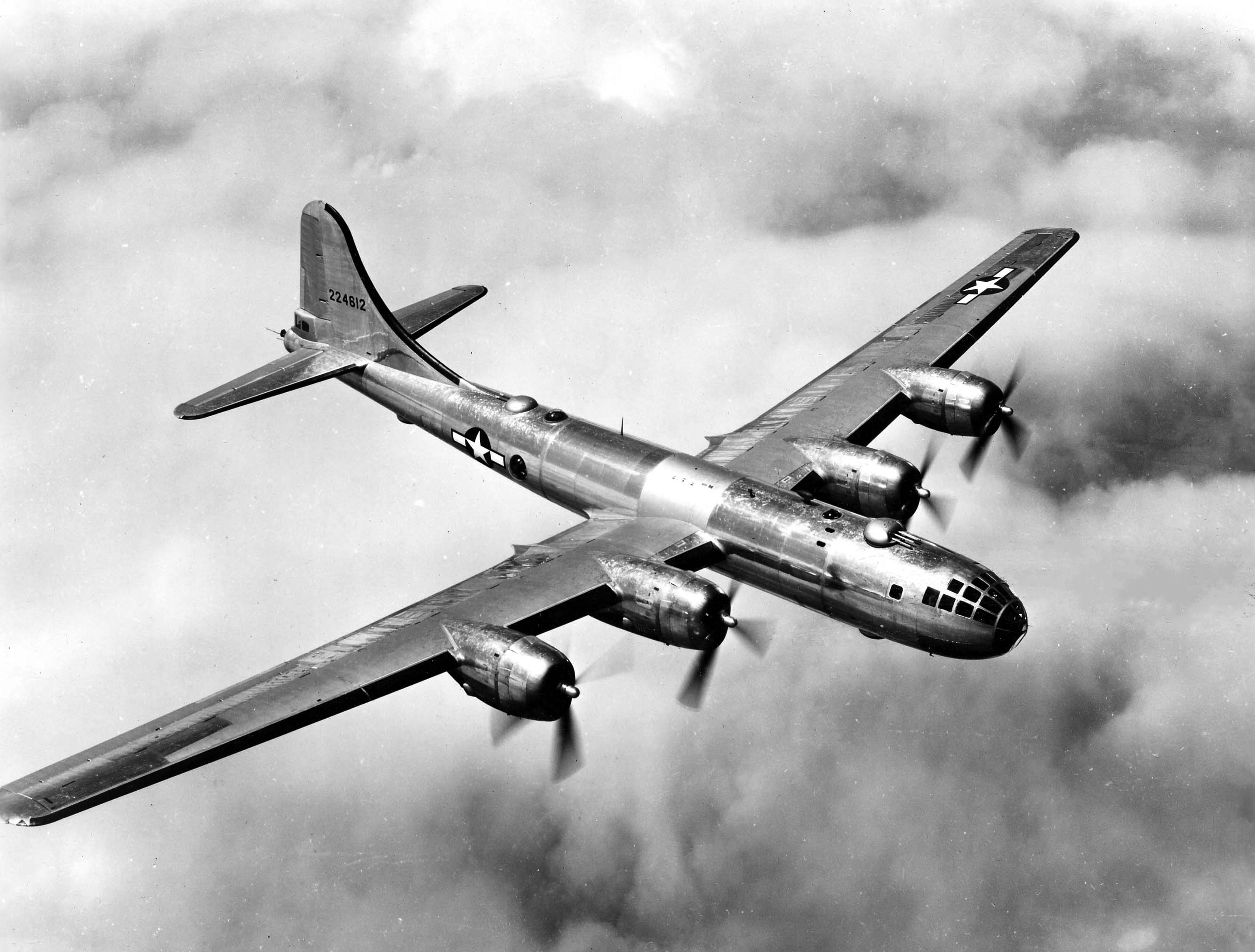
USAF B-29 in flight

The air force's role of strategic bombing against enemy infrastructure was developed during the 1930s by the Japanese in China and by the Germans during the Spanish Civil War. This role for the bomber was perfected during World War II, during Allied "Thousand Bomber Raid" operations. The need to intercept these bombers, both during the day and at night, accelerated fighter aircraft developments. The war ended when United States Army Air Forces Boeing B-29 Superfortress bombers dropped atomic bombs on Hiroshima and Nagasaki in Japan in August 1945.

=== Post World War II ===
The United States Air Force became an independent service in 1947. As the Cold War began, both the USAF and the Soviet Air Force built up their nuclear-capable strategic bomber forces. Several technological advances were widely introduced during this time: the jet engine; the missile; the helicopter; and inflight refueling.

In 1954 the Japan Air Self-Defense Force was founded as a separate service. Previously Japan had delivered its service aviation from within its Army and Navy.

During the 1960s, Canada merged the Royal Canadian Air Force with the army and the navy to form the unified Canadian Forces, with air assets divided between several commands and a green uniform for everyone. This proved very unpopular, and in 1975 Canadian aviation units were reorganized under a single organization (Air Command) with a single commander. In 2011 the Canadian Forces Air Command reverted to its pre-1960s name, the Royal Canadian Air Force.

== Organization ==
The organizational structures of air forces vary between nations: some air forces (such as the United States Air Force, the Royal Air Force) are divided into commands, groups and squadrons; others (such as the Soviet Air Force) have an Army-style organizational structure. The modern Royal Canadian Air Force uses Air Division as the formation between wings and the entire air command. Like the RAF, Canadian wings consist of squadrons. In the case of China the Air Force headquarters consists of four departments: Command, Political, Logistic, and Equipment, which mirrors the four general departments of the People's Liberation Army. Below the headquarters, Military Region Air Forces (MRAF) direct divisions (Fighter, Attack, Bomber), which in turn direct regiments and squadrons.

NATO Symbol (for Army comparison)	Unit Name (USAF/RAF/Other air forces)	No. of personnel	No. of aircraft	No. of subordinate units (USAF/RAF)	Officer in command (USAF/RAF)
	Combatant Command or national air force	Entire air force	Entire air force	All Major Commands / Commands	GAF / MRAF or Air Chf Mshl
	Major Command/Command or Tactical Air Force / Russian Air army	Varies	Varies	Varies by Region or Duty	Gen/Air Chf Mshl or Air Mshl
	Numbered Air Force/No RAF equivalent	Varies by Region or Duty	Varies	2+ Wings/Groups	Maj-Gen or Lt-Gen / N/A
	No USAF equivalent/No RAF equivalent /Aviation Division /Air division	Varies by Region or Duty	Varies	2+ Wings/Groups	Maj-Gen or Div-Gen
	Wing/Group (inc. EAGs) /Russian aviation brigade/Air Brigade	1,000–5,000	48–100	2+ Groups/Wings	Brig-Gen/AVM or Air Cdre
	Group/Wing (inc. EAWs) or Station /Russian aviation regiment	300–1,000	17–48	3–4 Squadrons/3–10 Flights	Col/Gp Capt or Wg Cdr
	Squadron	100–300	7–16	3–4 Flights	Lt Col or Maj/Wg Cdr or Sqn Ldr
	No USAF equivalent/No RAF equivalent /German staffel or echelon	40–160	6–12	1-2 Flights plus maintenance and support crew	Capt or Staff Captain
	Flight	20–100	4–6	2 Sections plus maintenance and support crew	Capt/Sqn Ldr or Flt Lt
	Element or Section	5–20	n/a–2	n/a	Junior Officer or Senior NCO
	Detail	2–4	n/a	n/a	Junior NCO

== Infantry ==
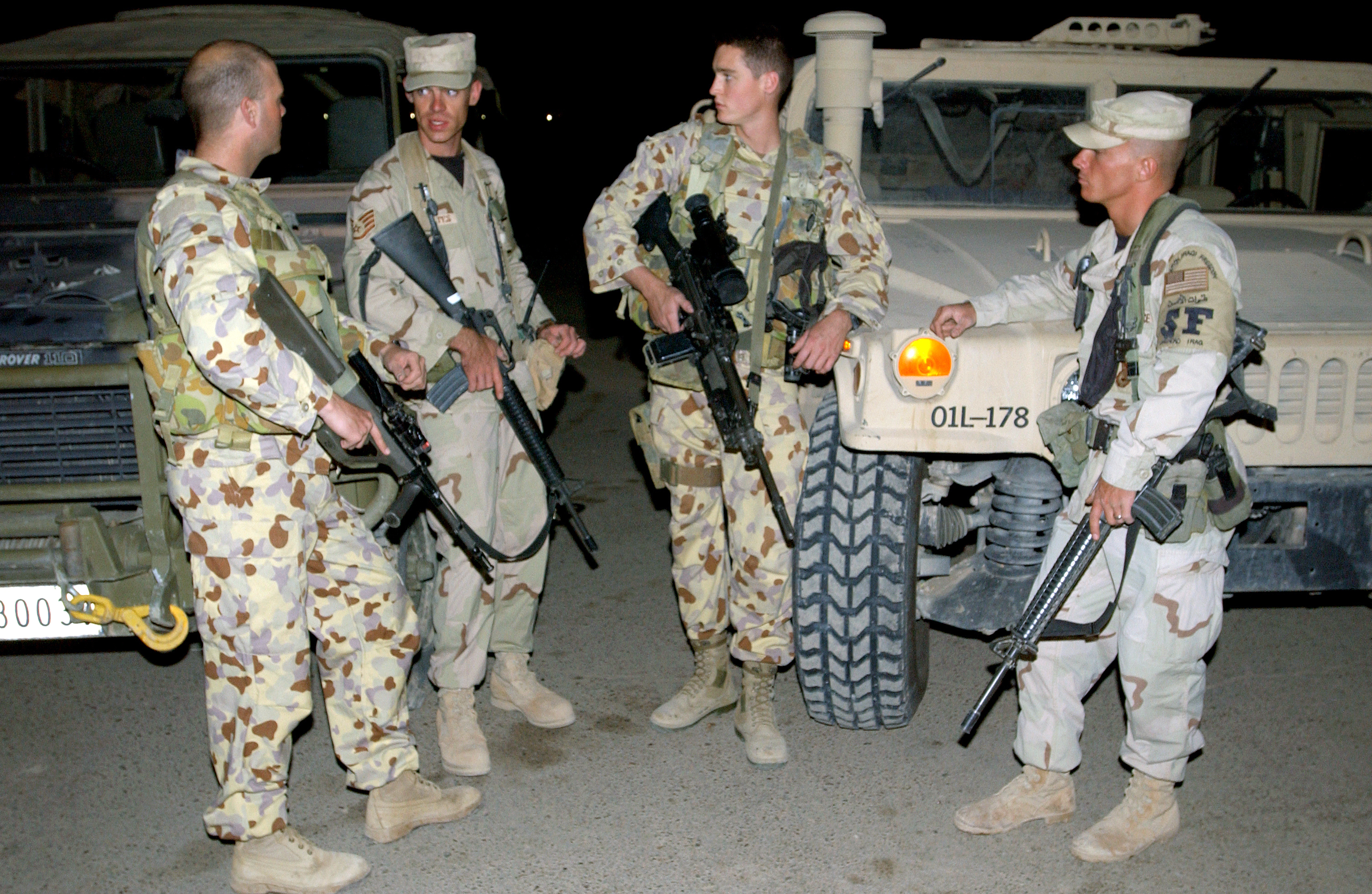
Two Royal Australian Air Force Airfield Defense Guards (at left and second from the right) with two members of the United States Air Force Security Forces at Baghdad International Airport.

Air assault and Airborne infantry in air forces are used primarily for ground-based defense of air bases and other air force facilities. They also have a number of other specialist roles, including Chemical, Biological, Radiological and Nuclear (CBRN) defense, offensive operations in defense of air force assets, and training other air force personnel in basic ground defense tactics.

== Special forces ==
Some air forces also include special forces which are used in a variety of roles including combat search and rescue, special reconnaissance, direct action, counterinsurgency, intelligence operations, and serving as joint terminal attack controllers attached to ground and special operations forces.

== See also ==
- Aerial warfare
- Airborne forces
- Air force academy
- List of air forces
- Military aircraft
- Security forces
- Space force
- Cyber force
