= Wilhelm Haehnelt =

German officer (1875–1946)

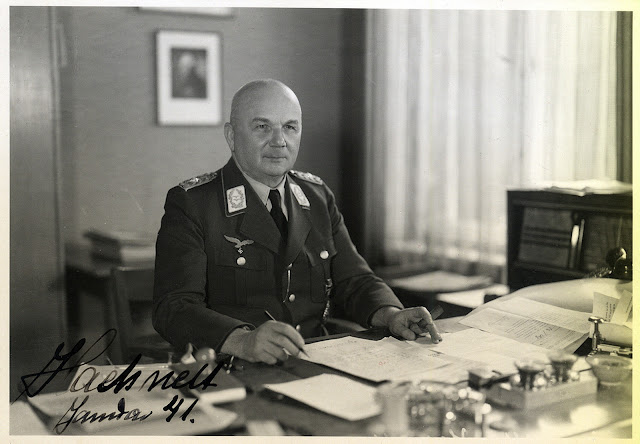
- Wilhelm Haehnelt in January of 1941
- Born: March 12, 1875; Posnan, German Empire
- Died: March 10, 1946 (aged 70); Sachsenhausen, Soviet occupation zone in Germany

Wilhelm Haehnelt (12 March 1875 – 10 March 1946) was a Luftwaffe General der Flieger (General of Aviators) in World War II.

== Biography ==
Wilhelm Haehnelt was born on March 12, 1875 in Posen (Poznań), German Empire. Haehnelt graduated on 14 February 1895 as an ensign in the 4th Lower Silesian Infantry Regiment no. 51 of the Prussian Army in Brieg. There he was promoted on 27 January 1896 to lieutenant, and served in the following years as a battalion adjutant and graduated from the Institute of War 1908. From October 1908 to February 1909 he was assigned to the aeronaut battalion and received his training as a balloon pilot. From 1 April 1909 to 30 September 1911 Haehnelt was assigned to Army General Staff. This was followed by a promotion to captain and his brief appointment as company commander. Following a temporary command of the air force, where he was trained as a pilot, Haehnelt was transferred on 1 October 1913 to the staff of the 4th Aviator Battalion to Strasbourg.

With the outbreak of World War I Haehnelt took command of the 4th Feldflieger air battalion on the Western Front. From 26 September 1914 to March 1917 Haehnelt served as a staff officer of the air battalion and in the General Staff of the 5th Army where he worked and served thereafter until the end of 1917 in the staff of the commander of the pilots of the 2nd Army. He was also charged with inspections of the air force on behalf of the Intelligence Chief of the Supreme Command.

In January 1918, he was assigned directly under Ernst von Hoeppner, the Commanding General of the Air Force. He subsequently saw more command over pilots within the 2nd Army. He spent the last months of the war with special functions entrusted as the inspector of the air force and from September 15 to December 14, 1918 as commander of all aviation schools and auxiliary defense air battalions. For his achievements he was awarded both classes of the Iron Cross.

After the war Haehnelt was appointed the Inspector of Flying Corps (Idflieg) on 15 December 1918. On 1 January 1920, he was transferred to Army high command as an officer for special duty in the Ministry of Defense. He held the same position then from May to December 1920 at the Military District Command III and the staff of the 3rd Division. On 31 December 1920, Haehnelt's position was eliminated as a result of the Treaty of Versailles and the consequent prohibition of air forces in Germany from active military service. On 21 January 1921, he was made a lieutenant colonel in the army.

From 1919 to 1935 Haehnelt was Vice President of the German Aero Club. He also served from 1926 to 1928 as Vice President of the German Air Sports Association, and from 1929-1933 as the national leader of the German Air Sports Association of Berlin, Brandenburg and Grenzmark, and from 1926-1933 as a board member of the Reichsluftschutzbund. In 1933 he became head of the Military Science Department of the Air Ministry and from 1 June 1935 to 31 March 1936 was head of the local military science department of the air war (1914-1918).

Haehnelt was taken as an E officer and colonel in the Air Force, adopted on 1 July 1938 in active service and acted as head of the War Department in Military Science of Aviation. In the meantime, he had been promoted to major general and on 1 December 1940, and then again to Lieutenant General on 1 January 1939. By 1 March 1942, Haehnelt was made a General of the air force but retired from active service roughly a month later.

After the war Haehnelt was arrested, though no crimes were specified, in May 1945 by the Soviet occupation forces and interned in the Sachsenhausen camp. He was never convicted, nor sentenced. Due to Soviet mistreatment, he died there on 10 March 1946, at the age of 70.
