= Richard Roethe =

German Army officer in World War I

Colonel Richard Roethe (1865–1944) was a German Army officer and an influential figure in German military aviation during World War I. By 1914 he was deputy Inspector of Flying Troops. In January 1914 he distributed the first pilots badges to members of the Flying Corps and later that year succeeded Colonel Walter von Eberhardt as the Inspector of Flying Troops, remaining in that post until 1916. Richard died in 1944 at age 79.

Military offices
Preceded by Walter von Eberhardt	Inspector of Flying Troops; 1914-1916	Succeeded by Wilhelm Siegert
