= Maurizio Moris =

Italian politician

Maurizio Valentino Mario Moris
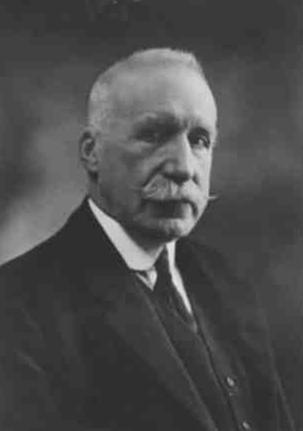
- Born: 13 October 1860
- Died: 19 September 1944 (aged 83)
- Occupations: Military officer, Senator

Maurizio Valentino Mario Moris (13 October 1860 – 19 September 1944) was an Italian military officer particularly associated with the development of military aviation in Italy. Later in life he was a senator.

He was admitted to the military academy in Turin in 1879. Moris flew in a balloon over Rome on 14 June 1894 at his own expense.

Before World War I, Moris was appointed Inspector General of Aeronautical Services in the Italian War Ministry, holding the rank of colonel. He studied the possibility of using military aircraft against the Turks in Libya and Italian bombing operations were subsequently conducted during the Italo-Turkish War 1911.

In January 1915, he left the Inspectorate to take on the role of General Director for Aeronautics at the Ministry of War. After the First World War, Moris rose through the senior ranks to lieutenant general and he was appointed a senator in 1939. He was also chairman of the Italian "Association of Aviation Pioneers".
