= Walter von Eberhardt =

German general (1862–1944)

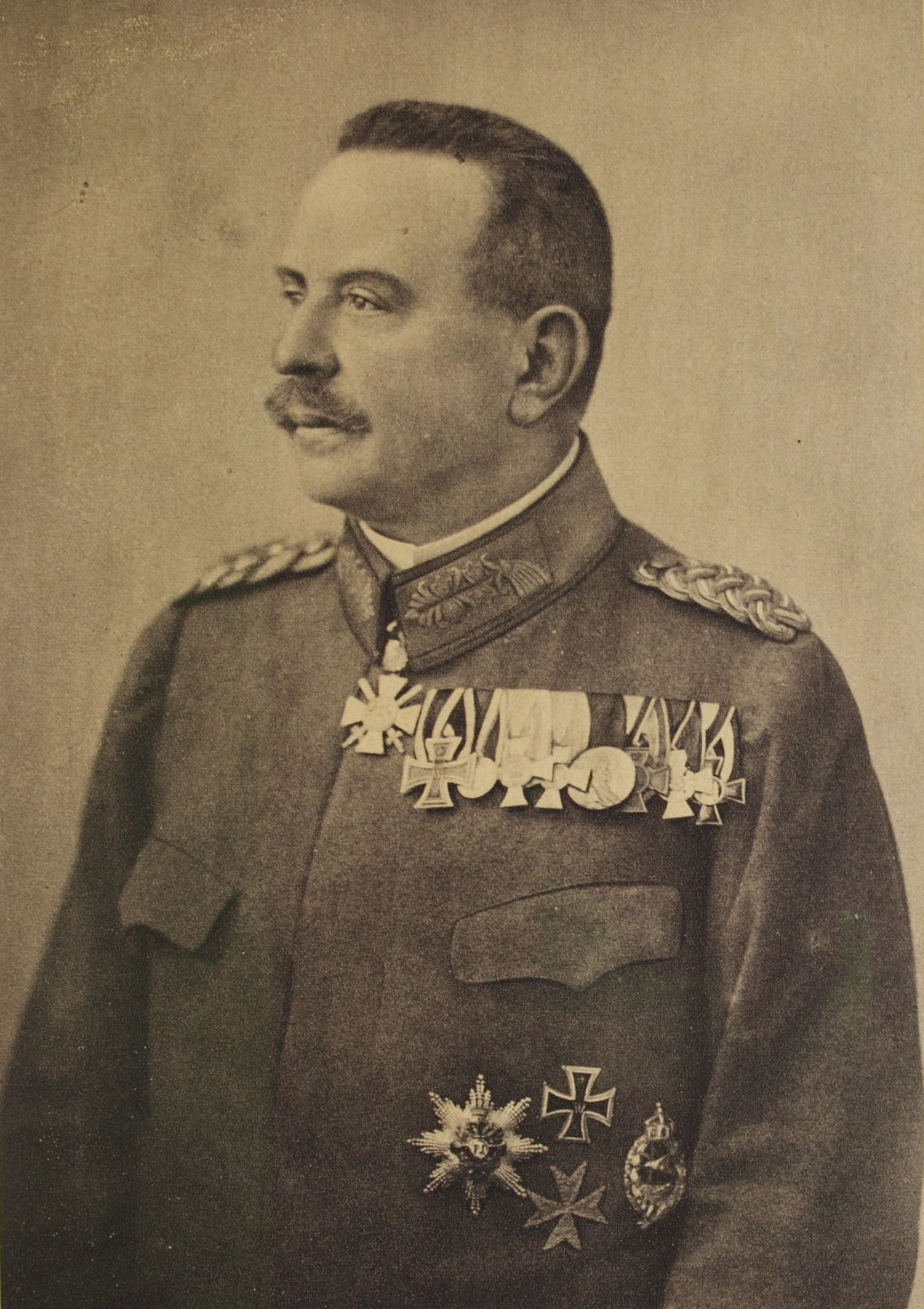
General von Eberhardt in 1918

Lieutenant-General Friedrich Wilhelm Magnus Heinrich Walter von Eberhardt (7 January 1862 in Berlin – 7 January 1944 in Wernigerode), generally known as Walter von Eberhardt, was a German military commander during World War I and the Lithuanian–Soviet War of 1918–19. He was the son of later Prussian Major general Heinrich von Eberhardt (1821–1899). His older brothers also made career in the Prussian army. Magnus (1855–1939) raised till General of Infantry, Gaspard von Eberhardt (1858–1928) to Lieutenant general. Notably, he was the first inspector of the flying troops (Idflieg) from 1913 to 1914. In 1930 Unserere Luftstreitkräfte 1914–1918 was published under the editorship of von Eberhardt.

== Literature ==
- Bernhard Sauer: Vom Mythos eines ewigen Soldatentums. Der Feldzug deutscher Freikorps im Baltikum im Jahre 1919. In: Zeitschrift für Geschichtswissenschaft (ZfG), 43. Jahrgang, 1995, Heft 10, S. 869–902 (PDF-Datei; 7,28 MB)
- Eberhardt, Walter (Hrsg.): Unsere Luftstreitkräfte 1914–18. Ein Denkmal deutschen Heldentums. Vaterländischer Verlag C.A. Weller, Berlin, 1930
- Sullivan, Charles L.: The 1919 German Campaign in the Baltic: The Final Phase, in: Vytas Stanley Vardys & Romuald J. Misiunas (Hg.): The Baltic States in Peace and War, 1917–1945. Pennsylvania State University Press, University Park, Pennsylvania, 1978, ISBN 978-0-271-00534-8 (engl.)

Military offices
| New title | Inspector of Flying Troops; 1913–1914 | Succeeded by Richard Roethe |
