= Idflieg =

Imperial German military aviation bureau

The Idflieg (Inspektion der Fliegertruppen - "Inspectorate of Flying Troops") was the bureau of the German Empire that oversaw German military aviation prior to and during World War I.

Founded in 1911, the Idflieg was part of the Fliegertruppen des deutschen Kaiserreiches (Imperial German Flying Corps) which became the Luftstreitkräfte in 1916, handling administration, including regulation of service names applied to aircraft produced by domestic companies, characterised according to the armament, wing configuration, crew and role which was intended for the aircraft.

== Inspectors of Flying Troops ==
- Colonel Walter von Eberhardt (1913–1914)
- Major Richard Roethe (1914–1916)
- Major, later Lieutenant-Colonel Wilhelm Siegert (1916–1918)
- Captain Wilhelm Haehnelt (1918–1919)

== See also ==
- Idflieg aircraft designation system
