= LFG V 101 =

1920s German seaplane airliner

V 101 Jasmund

General information
- Type: Floatplane airliner
- National origin: Germany
- Manufacturer: LFG

History
- First flight: ca. 1926

The LFG V 101 Jasmund (named for Jasmund on Rügen) was a seaplane airliner produced in small quantities in Germany in the 1920s. It was a conventional, strut-braced, low-wing monoplane with an enclosed cabin for five passengers, an enlarged, metal development of the V 20 Arkona (of which a metal version had already been flown).

The V 101 was produced to operate alongside the V 13s and V 20s in service with Luft-Fahrzeug and Luftverkehr Pommern on seaplane routes in North Germany from 1926, possibly in favour of the V 59 that had been considered for this role.

== Specifications ==
General characteristics

- Crew: One pilot
- Capacity: 5 passengers
- Length: 9.85 m (32 ft 4 in)
- Wingspan: 15.65 m (51 ft 4 in)
- Height: 3.60 m (11 ft 10 in)
- Wing area: 40.0 m^{2} (430 sq ft)
- Empty weight: 1,300 kg (2,860 lb)
- Gross weight: 1,950 kg (4,290 lb)
- Powerplant: 1 × Armstrong Siddeley Puma , 180 kW (240 hp)

Performance

- Maximum speed: 170 km/h (110 mph, 96 kn)
- Stall speed: 150 km/h (94 mph, 82 kn)
- Range: 680 km (425 mi, 369 nmi)
- Service ceiling: 3,500 m (11,500 ft)
- Rate of climb: 2.1 m/s (410 ft/min)
