= LFG Roland D.IX =

1910s German fighter aircraft prototype

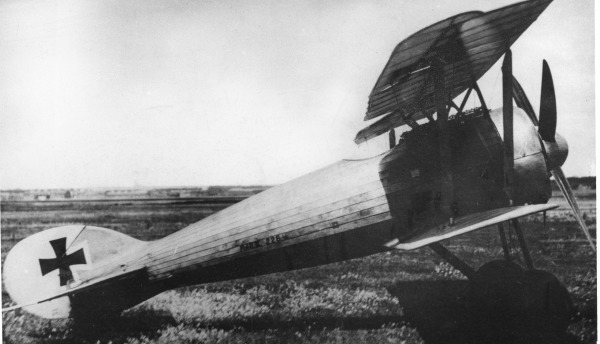
- LFG Roland D.IX first prototype

General information
- Type: Single-seat fighter
- National origin: Germany
- Manufacturer: LFG Roland (Luft-Fahrzeug-Gesellschaft)
- Number built: 3

History
- First flight: Late 1917-early 1918

The LFG Roland D.IX was a World War I German single seat fighter aircraft, a biplane powered by one of a new generation of powerful rotary engines. Three slightly different prototypes were built but there was no series production.

== Design and development ==
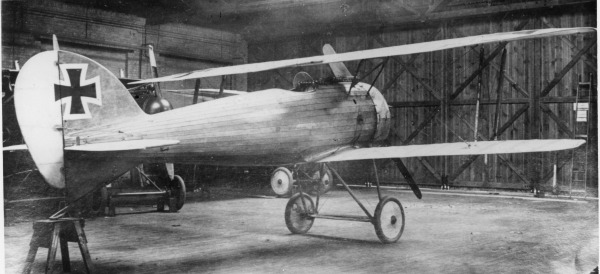
LFG Roland D.IX second prototype

Late in 1917 new, more powerful rotary engines were appearing and the Idflieg encouraged aircraft manufacturers to incorporate them into fighters. The D.IX was LFG Roland's response. Apart from its engine it had much in common with the earlier D.VI, D.VII and D.VIII designs. It was a two bay biplane, with straight wings of constant chord and blunt tips. The upper plane was a little larger in both span and chord, so the two interplane struts on each side diverged slightly upwards and leant gently outwards. Bracing was assisted by flying and landing wires. There were ailerons on the upper wing only, the first and third prototypes using the overhung, balanced type and the second with unbalanced ones ending at the wing tip.

The D.IX had a fuselage of the Klinkerrumpf (clinker-built fuselage) type, roughly circular in cross section and built from overlapping longitudinal strips of spruce over a light, wooden frame, pioneered by LFG on the D.IV and used on the D.VI, D.VII and D.VIII. Because of the shortness and large diameter of the 160 hp (119 kW) Siemens-Halske Sh.III geared rotary of the first prototype, the nose of the new fighter was short and blunt compared with those of the earlier aircraft, which had all used liquid cooled V engines. Nonetheless, the metal oil deflecting cowling was carefully blended into the wooden fuselage. The rotary engine drove a four blade propeller, an unusual feature at this time and only fitted to one other LFG fighter, the later D.XVI. The tailplane of the fighter was straight edged with blunt tips and slightly rounded, split elevators. Its vertical tail repeated the small ventral fin of the D.VI and later Rolands and the rudder was similarly deep and rounded, but the tail surfaces of the second prototype were much enlarged and the rudder of the third horn balanced. The D.IX's conventional undercarriage was of the single axle type, mounted on V-struts to the lower fuselage and with a tailskid attached to the ventral fin.

As well the ailerons and empennage revisions of the later prototypes, both were powered by the newer, 210 hp (157 kW) Siemens-Halske Sh.IIIa rotary.

== Operational history ==
The first prototype flew in the first D type competition, held in January 1918, and performed well but was lost soon after in an accident in which the pilot's seat collapsed, followed by an inadvertent loop with g-forces that expelled him through the fuselage bottom. The armed second prototype continued development and took part in the second D type competition held in May. There it was judged not worthy of series production.

== Specifications ==
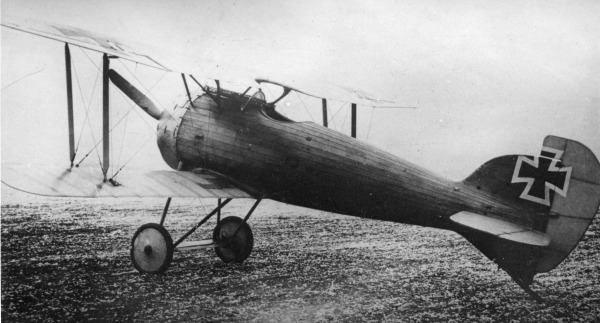
LFG Roland D.IX third prototype

Data from Green and Swanborough p.339.

General characteristics

- Crew: One
- Length: 5.90 m (19 ft 4 in)
- Wingspan: 8.92 m (29 ft 3 in)
- Height: 2.75 m (9 ft 0 in)
- Wing area: 18.48 m^{2} (198.9 sq ft)
- Empty weight: 534 kg (1,177 lb)
- Gross weight: 724 kg (1,596 lb)
- Powerplant: 1 × Siemens-Halske Sh.III 11-cylinder rotary engine, 120 kW (160 hp)
- Propellers: 4-bladed

Performance

- Maximum speed: 185 km/h (115 mph, 100 kn)
- Time to altitude: 16.4 min to 5,000 m (16,400 ft)

Armament

- Guns: 2× synchronised 7.9 mm (0.31 in) LMG 08/15 machine guns

== Bibliography ==
- Herris, Jack (2014). Roland Aircraft of WWI: A Centennial Perspective on Great War Airplanes. Great War Aviation Centennial Series. Vol. 9. Aeronaut Books. ISBN 978-1-935881-20-9.
