= LFG V 52 =

German interwar monoplane

V 52

General information
- Type: Two seat sports aircraft
- National origin: Germany
- Manufacturer: LFG (Luft-Fahrzeug-Gesellschaft)
- Number built: 1

History
- First flight: 1925

The V 52 was a one off, single engine, two seat sports monoplane, built in Germany in 1925.

== Design and development ==
Whilst the other LFG two seat monoplane sports aircraft (the V 40, V 42 and V 44) produced in 1925 were all metal designs, the V 52 employed wooden construction. It also differed from them in having a braced, rather than wholly cantilever wing. This was built around wooden box spares, with three ply ribs and fabric covering. The fuselage was also wooden, with three ply covering.

Like the V 40, the V 52 was powered by a 75 hp (56 kW) Siemens-Halske Sh 11 7-cylinder radial engine.

== Operational history ==
The V 52 was amongst five LFG entries to the Round Germany Flight held in the summer of 1925, though only the LFG V 39 biplane took take part, with all four monoplanes failing to make the start.

== Specifications ==
Data from Flight 28 May 1925 p.324

General characteristics

- Crew: One
- Capacity: One passenger
- Wingspan: 10 m (32 ft 10 in)
- Wing area: 13.3 m^{2} (143 sq ft)
- Powerplant: 1 × Siemens-Halske Sh 11 7-cylinder radial engine, 41 kW (55 hp)

Performance

- Maximum speed: 145 km/h (90 mph, 78 kn)
- Landing speed: 60 km/h (37 mph)
