= LFG Roland D.III =

1910s German fighter aircraft

Roland D.III
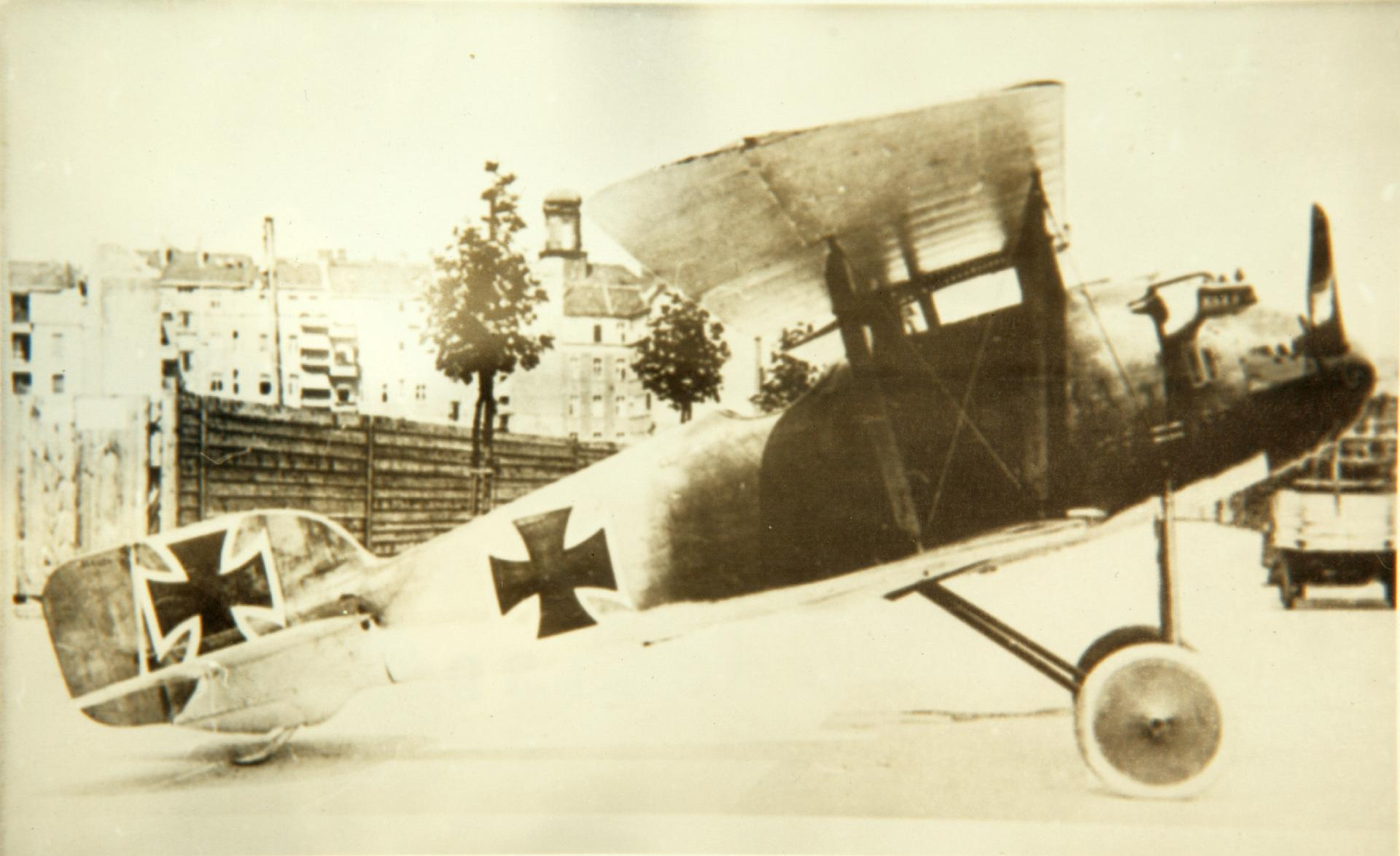

General information
- Type: Fighter
- National origin: Germany
- Manufacturer: LFG
- Designer: Dipl Ing Tantzen
- Primary user: Luftstreitkräfte
- Number built: 3

History
- First flight: 1916
- Developed from: LFG Roland D.I

The LFG Roland D.III was a fighter aircraft produced in Germany during World War I.

== Design and development ==
The D.III was a further development of the D.I fighter. These machines had a fuselage that completely filled the interplane gap, a design feature intended to improve aerodynamics. However, it also resulted in limiting the pilot's field of vision in the down and forward direction, leading to complaints. LFG attempted to remedy this in the D.III design by introducing a gap between the upper fuselage and the upper wing, braced by cabane struts. The size of the tailplane was also increased.

While this did indeed result in an improvement over the Roland D.II that had preceded it, the performance of the D.III was inferior to that of other contemporary fighters available to the German Army, in particular those produced by Albatros, and the aircraft was therefore only produced in small quantities.

Forward visibility, though better in the D.III than the D.I was still not good and LFG tried to improve it with another variant, the D.V. The fuselage diameter was decreased and the decking forward of the cockpit lowered exposing all of the upper parts of the engine cylinders. Three were built, one with the Argus engine of the D.II and two with the 119 kW (160 hp) Mercedes D.III, another upright 6-cylinder engine. The visibility was not much improved and the problem was only solved with the LFG Roland D.VII, which used a V-8 engine.

== Variants ==
D.V
Lowered fuselage to improve pilot's view. Three built, one with Argus and two with Mercedes engines.

== Operators ==
Bulgaria

- Bulgarian Air Force

German Empire

- Luftstreitkrafte

== Specifications (D.III) ==
General characteristics

- Crew: One pilot
- Length: 6.84 m (22 ft 5 in)
- Wingspan: 8.94 m (29 ft 4 in)
- Height: 2.76 m (9 ft 1 in)
- Wing area: 19.8 m^{2} (213 sq ft)
- Empty weight: 717 kg (1,580 lb)
- Gross weight: 961 kg (2,119 lb)
- Powerplant: 1 × Argus As.III 6-cylinder inline water-cooled , 134 kW (180 hp)

Performance

- Maximum speed: 175 km/h (109 mph, 95 kn)
- Cruise speed: 156 km/h (98 mph, 85 kn)
- Endurance: 2 hours 30 minutes
- Service ceiling: 4,500 m (14,800 ft)
- Rate of climb: 4.5 m/s (880 ft/min)

Armament

- 2 × fixed, forward-firing 7.92 mm LMG 08/15 machine guns

== Bibliography ==
- Gray, Peter & Thetford, Owen (1987) [1970]. German Aircraft of the First World War (2nd ed.). Putnam. ISBN 0-85177-809-7.
- Green, William & Swanborough, Gordon (2001) [1994]. The Complete Book of Fighters: An Illustrated Encyclopedia of Every Fighter Built and Flown (Revised and Updated ed.). Salamander Books. ISBN 1-84065-269-1.
- Herris, Jack (2014). Roland Aircraft of WWI: A Centennial Perspective on Great War Airplanes. Great War Aviation Centennial Series. Vol. 9. Aeronaut Books. ISBN 978-1-935881-20-9.
- Taylor, Michael J. H. (1989). Jane's Encyclopedia of Aviation. London: Studio Editions.
- World Aircraft Information Files. London: Bright Star Publishing.
