= V52 =

V52 may refer to:

- DB Class V 52, a German locomotive
- Jiabao V52, a Chinese microvan
- LFG V 52, a German sport aircraft
- Mali-V52, a SoC mobile GPU
- Vanadium-52, an isotope of vanadium
