= V42 =

V42 may refer to:

- Honda V42 Magna, a motorcycle
- ITU-T V.42, an error-correction protocol
- LFG V 42, a German sport aircraft
- Nissan Quest (V42), a minivan
- V-42 stiletto, a fighting knife
- Vanadium-42, an isotope of vanadium
- Haplogroup E-V42, a paternal genetic lineage
- V^{4}_{2}, the third inversion of the dominant seventh chord
