= Pfalz D.III =

1917 German fighter aircraft

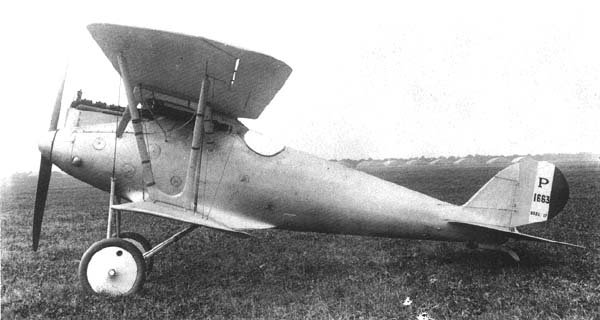

General information
- Type: Fighter
- Manufacturer: Pfalz Flugzeugwerke GmbH
- Primary user: Luftstreitkräfte
- Number built: approximately 1,010

History
- First flight: April 1917

The Pfalz D.III was a fighter aircraft used by the Luftstreitkräfte (Imperial German Air Service) during the First World War. The D.III was the first major original design from Pfalz Flugzeugwerke. Though generally considered inferior to contemporary Albatros and Fokker fighters, the D.III was widely used by the Jagdstaffeln from late 1917 to mid-1918. It continued to serve as a training aircraft until the end of the war.

== Background ==
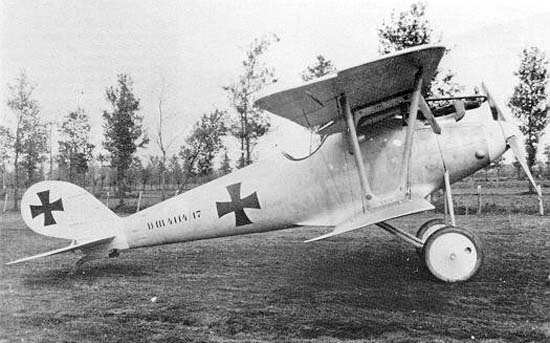
Pfalz D.III (serial 4114/17) of Marine Feld Jasta II

Prior to World War I, Pfalz Flugzeugwerke produced Morane-Saulnier monoplane designs under licence. These aircraft entered military service as the Pfalz A- and E-series. In September 1916, Pfalz began producing the first of 20 Roland D.I and 200 Roland D.II fighters under licence.

In November 1916 Pfalz hired Rudolph Gehringer from Flugzeugbau Friedrichshafen GmbH. Gehringer immediately commenced work on an original fighter design. The resulting D.III emerged in April 1917.

== Design and development ==
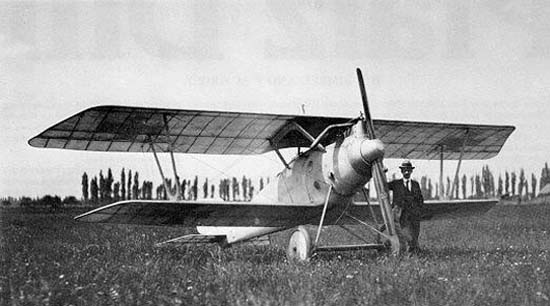
Pfalz D.III prototype in April 1917

Like the Rolands, the D.III used a plywood monocoque fuselage. Two layers of thin plywood strips were placed over a mould to form one half of a fuselage shell. The fuselage halves were then glued together, covered with a layer of fabric, and doped. This Wickelrumpf (wrapped body) method was a patented invention of the LFG firm. It gave the fuselage great strength, light weight, and smooth contours compared to conventional construction techniques. However, it also proved to be more labour-intensive and expensive. Furthermore, fuselages of the Wickelrumpf type proved to be liable to twisting or warping in service, affecting performance as well as causing control problems. This has been attributed to moisture absorption in damp front-line conditions or to the use of insufficiently seasoned wood.

The wings were of conventional construction, with a flush Teves und Braun radiator offset to the right side of the upper wing. The ailerons were wooden, rather than the more usual steel tube construction. The horizontal stabiliser had an inverted airfoil section, which facilitated dive recovery and permitted the use of an unbalanced elevator.

Idflieg found the prototype promising. It directed Pfalz to halt production of the Roland D.III and to complete the balance of the contract, 70 aircraft, to the new design. After a Typenprüfung (type test) at Adlershof in May, the Idflieg ordered various modifications, including an enlarged rudder and horn-balanced ailerons. In June 1917, Pfalz received a second order for 300 aircraft.

== Operational history ==
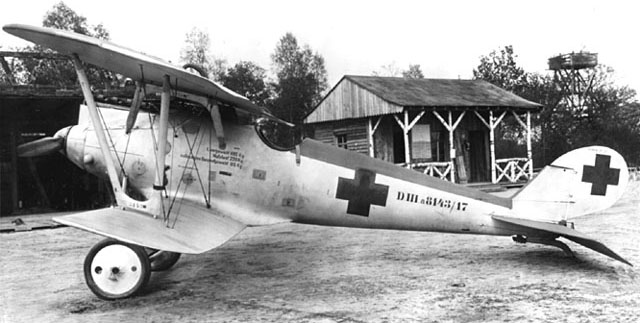
Pfalz D.IIIa (serial 8143/17) flown by Oberleutnant Walter Ewers of Jasta 77b. The aircraft displays hastily applied Balkenkreuz markings

Deliveries to operational units began in August 1917. Jasta 10 was the first recipient of the new aircraft, followed by Jasta 4. While markedly better than the earlier Roland designs, the D.III was generally considered inferior to the Albatros D.III and D.V. German pilots variously criticised the Pfalz's heavy controls, low speed, lack of power, or low rate of climb compared to the Albatros. The D.III slipped in turns, leading to crashes when unwary pilots turned at very low altitudes. Moreover, the Pfalz stalled sharply and spun readily. Recovery from the resulting flat spin was difficult, though some pilots took advantage of this trait to descend quickly or evade enemy aircraft.

The Pfalz's primary advantage was its strength and sturdiness. The Albatros scouts were plagued by failure of their single-spar lower wings. The Pfalz, however, could safely dive at high speeds due to its twin-spar lower wing. For this reason, the Pfalz was well-suited to diving attacks on observation balloons, which were usually heavily defended by anti-aircraft guns trained to the balloon's altitude.

=== D.IIIa ===
The most pressing complaint about the new Pfalz was that the guns were buried in the fuselage, preventing pilots from clearing gun jams in flight. This feature had been carried over from the earlier Roland designs. In November 1917, Pfalz responded by producing the slightly modified D.IIIa, which relocated the guns to the upper fuselage decking. The D.IIIa was distinguishable by its enlarged semicircular horizontal stabiliser and cropped lower wingtips. It also featured a more powerful version of the Mercedes D.III engine.

Pfalz built approximately 260 D.III and 750 D.IIIa aircraft. Most were delivered to Bavarian Jastas. Once Pfalz completed the final batch in May 1918, production shifted to the D.IIIa's successor, the D.XII. Some aircraft from the final D.IIIa batch were delivered to Turkey.

As of 30 April 1918, 433 D.IIIa scouts were still in frontline use. By 31 August, that number had declined to 166. Many serviceable aircraft were sent to advanced training schools, but approximately 100 aircraft remained in frontline use at the time of the Armistice.

== Operators ==
German Empire

- Luftstreitkräfte
- Kaiserliche Marine

Ottoman Empire

- Ottoman Air Force

== Replica aircraft ==
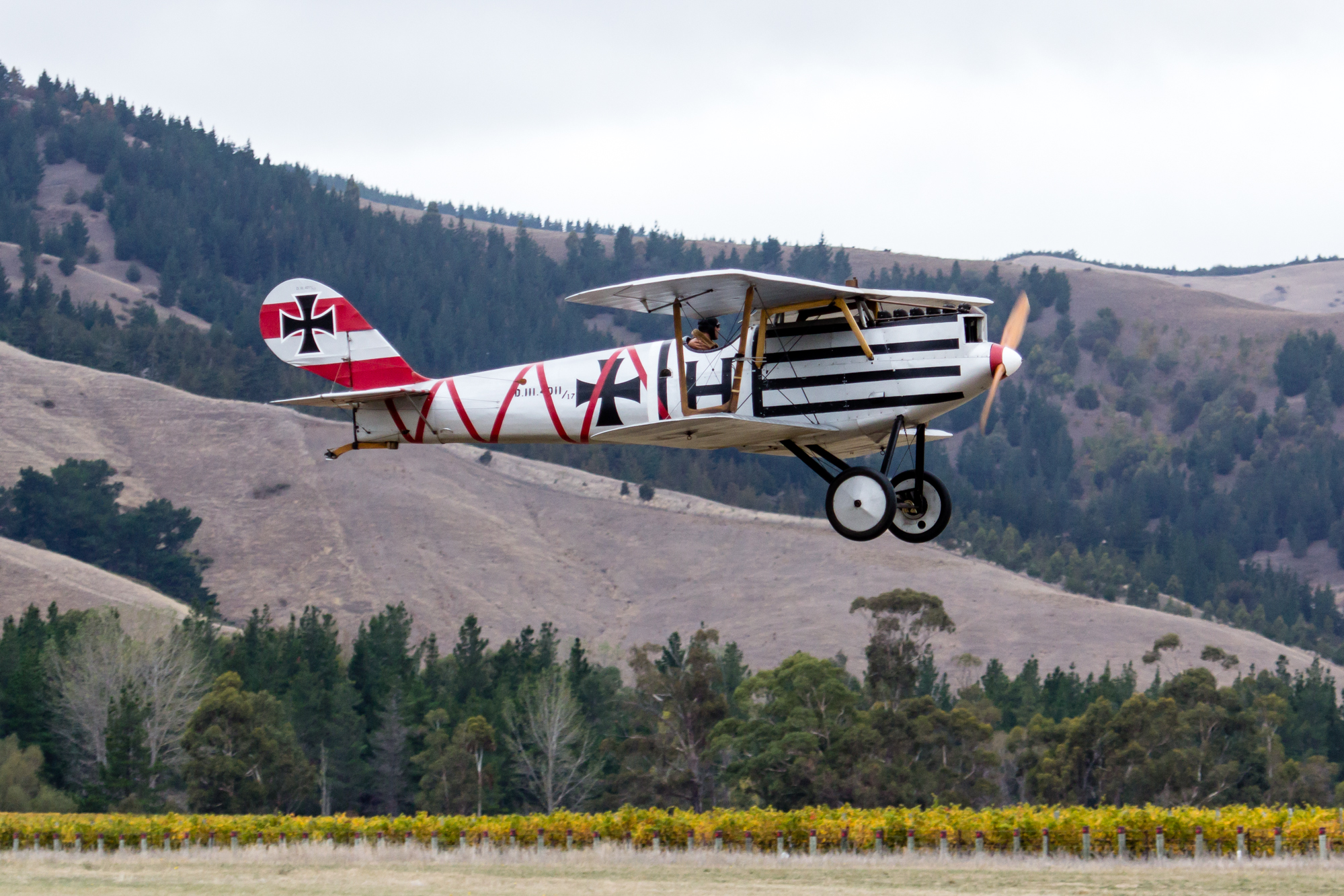
Replica Pfalz D.III (ZK-FLZ) at the Classic Fighters 2015 airshow in Blenheim, New Zealand

Today, there are no known surviving D.III airframes. However, two flying replicas were built for the 1966 film The Blue Max. One replica was built from scratch, while a second was converted from a de Havilland Tiger Moth airframe. Both replicas are currently based at the Omaka Aviation Heritage Centre in New Zealand. A third flying replica was built by Ron Kitchen of Nevada in 1987 but is now on static display at the Cavanaugh Flight Museum in Addison, Texas.

Another, static replica was built by the modern Pfalz company in 2005 and is on display at the Technik Museum Speyer.

== Specifications (D.IIIa) ==
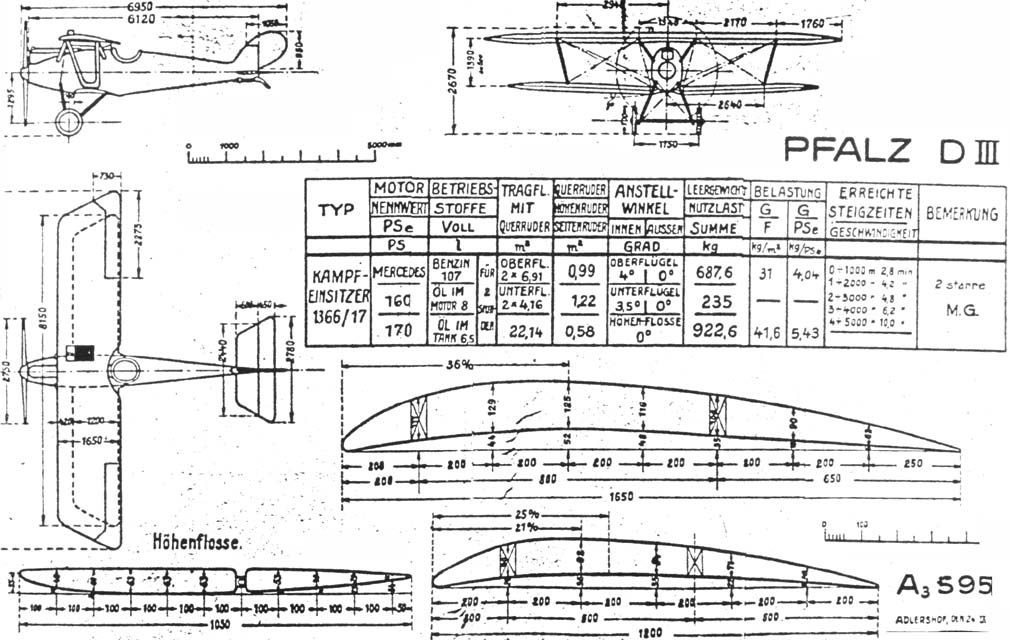
Pfalz D.III Baubeschreibung drawing

Data from German Aircraft of the First World War

General characteristics

- Crew: 1
- Length: 6.95 m (22 ft 10 in)
- Wingspan: 9.4 m (30 ft 10 in)
- Height: 2.67 m (8 ft 9 in)
- Wing area: 22.17 m^{2} (238.6 sq ft)
- Empty weight: 695 kg (1,532 lb)
- Gross weight: 933 kg (2,056 lb)
- Powerplant: 1 × Mercedes D.IIIa 6-cyl. water-cooled in-line piston engine, 130 kW (180 hp)

Performance

- Maximum speed: 165.0 km/h (102.5 mph, 89.1 kn) at 3,000 m (10,000 ft)
  - 147.3 km/h (91.5 mph) at 4,600 m (15,000 ft)
- Endurance: ca. 2 1/2 hours
- Service ceiling: 6,000 m (20,000 ft)
- Time to altitude:
  - 1,500 m (5,000 ft) in 6 minutes 55 seconds
  - 3,000 m (10,000 ft) in 17 minutes 30 seconds

Armament

- Guns: 2 × 7.92 mm LMG 08/15 "Spandau" machine guns

== See also ==
Related lists

- List of military aircraft of Germany
- List of fighter aircraft
