= LFG Roland D.VII =

1910s German fighter aircraft prototype

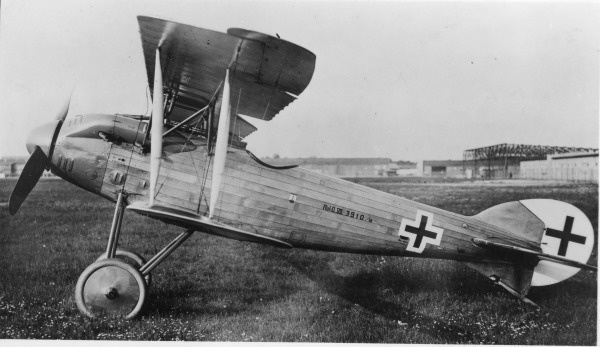

General information
- Type: Single seat fighter aircraft
- National origin: Germany
- Manufacturer: LFG Roland (Luft-Fahrzeug-Gesellschaft)
- Number built: 2 (second as D.VIII)

History
- First flight: late 1917-early 1918

The Luft-Fahrzeug-Gesellschaft (LFG) Roland D.VII was a German single seat, single engine biplane fighter aircraft built during World War I. Problems with its underdeveloped V-8 engine prevented its production.

== Design and development ==
The D.VII was a response by LFG to continued criticism of the pilot's limited forward and downward view from its fighters. The D.V and D.VI had attempted to address this problem though not very successfully. Since the height of the Mercedes D.III and Benz Bz.IIIa inline engines used in these two designs were part of the problem, LFG decided to install the new 60° V-8 Benz Bz.IIIb, lowering the cylinders and providing a gap between them.

Apart from its engine, the D.VII had much in common with the D.VI, particularly with the original D.VIa variant. It was a single bay biplane with pairs of near-parallel interplane struts and blunt-tipped wings of almost constant chord, though less staggered than on the D.VI. The upper wing was carried above the fuselage by a cabane; only this wing-mounted ailerons. A small cut-out in its trailing edge above the cockpit enhanced the pilot's view. The vertical tail was rounded, with a deep, wide chord rudder that extended below the fuselage to meet a small ventral fin. Both types had Klinkerrumpf, clinker built fuselages, monocoques constructed with thin overlapping spruce strips over a light wooden internal framework and oval in cross-section. The engine was totally enclosed in the nose, driving a two-blade propeller. The D.VII's conventional undercarriage had mainwheels on a single axle, supported by long V-struts to the lower fuselage and a tail skid on the leading edge of the ventral fin.

Pilots agreed that the revised forward profile changed the view from poor on the D.VI to excellent on the D.VII. During development, the D.VII acquired some of the features of the D.VIb, most noticeably overhung, balanced ailerons. The empennage was also modified to a form close to that of the D.VIb, with a small, lower, and broader fin and broad chord balanced rudder. The tailplane was lowered from the top of the fuselage to its midpoint.

Development of the D.VII was interrupted by problems with the Benz engine, itself still under development. Nonetheless, the D.VII took part in the second D. competition (for fighter types) held in May 1918. In the end, the recurrent engine problems led to development being abandoned.

LFG fitted a second aircraft with a geared version of the Benz engine, a 185 hp (138 kW) Benz Bz.IIIbm, redesignating it as the LFG Roland D.VIII; this also attended the second D. competition. Its report marked it unfit for series production; the reasons are not recorded, but it is known this geared engine, again in early development, suffered from severe vibration.

== Variants ==
D.VII
direct drive, 185 hp (138 kW) Benz Bz.IIIbo. One built.
D.VIII
geared drive, Benz Bz.IIIbm. One built.
D.XIII
D.VII based but with a 190 hp (142 kW) Körting Kg.III water-cooled V-8 engine. The sole example was first flown in May 1918. Flight tests proved the engine unsatisfactory and it was returned to Körting for modification, with the intention of refitting it. However, the engineless D.XIII was destroyed in a hangar fire that July. One built.
D.XIV
As D.XIII, but with a 160 hp (119 kW) Goebel Goe.III 11-cylinder rotary engine. It took part in the second D competition of May 1918 but its unreliable engine denied it production status. One built.

== Specifications (D.VII) ==
Data from Green and Swanborough p.338

General characteristics

- Crew: One
- Length: 6.10 m (20 ft 0 in)
- Wingspan: 8.84 m (29 ft 0 in)
- Height: 2.80 m (9 ft 2 in)
- Wing area: 20.83 m^{2} (224.2 sq ft)
- Empty weight: 666 kg (1,468 lb)
- Gross weight: 858 kg (1,892 lb)
- Powerplant: 1 × Benz Bz.IIIbo upright V-8, water-cooled, direct drive, 138 kW (185 hp)
- Propellers: 2-bladed

Performance

- Maximum speed: 190 km/h (120 mph, 100 kn)
- Endurance: 1.5 hr
- Time to altitude: 16.2 min to 5,000 m (16,400 ft)

Armament

- Guns: 2× synchronised 7.9 mm (0.31 in) LMG 08/15 machine guns

== Bibliography ==
- Herris, Jack (2014). Roland Aircraft of WWI: A Centennial Perspective on Great War Airplanes. Great War Aviation Centennial Series. Vol. 9. Aeronaut Books. ISBN 978-1-935881-20-9.
