= LFG V 59 =

1920s German seaplane airliner

V 59/V 61
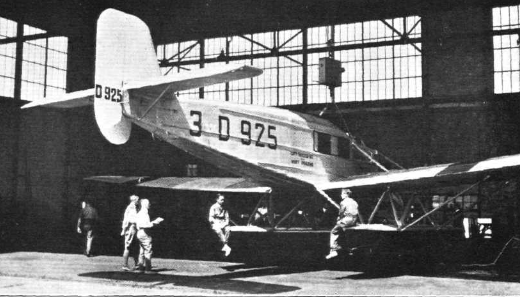
- V 61

General information
- Type: Passenger transport
- National origin: Germany
- Manufacturer: LFG (Luft-Fahrzeug-Gesellschaft)
- Number built: 3 (2×V 59 and 1×V 61)

History
- First flight: 1926

The LFG V 59 and the LFG V 61 were single engine, twin float passenger seaplanes designed and built in Germany in 1926 by the Luft-Fahrzeug-Gesellschaft. They differed only in their engines.

== Design and development ==
The V 59 and V 61 were both twin float seaplanes, essentially identical apart from their engines and designed to carry four or five passengers. The V 59 was powered by a 240 hp (179 kW) BMW IV 6-cylinder water cooled inline and the V 61 by a much more powerful, 400 hp (298 kW) Bristol Jupiter 9-cylinder radial. They were metal aircraft both in frame and covering, low wing monoplanes of the semi-cantilever kind with external bracing between the upper fuselage and wing and further support from below via the flat topped floats. The wings were straight tapered with rounded tips. The fuselage was flat sided and bottomed, with windows down the side and with a braced tailplane mounted on top of it. The rudder extended well below the keel.

== Operational history ==
Both the V 59 and the V 61 were entered into the German Seaplane Competition, held between 12–23 July 1926 with flights along the Baltic and North Sea coasts from Warnemünde. The V 59 did not score in the technical tests but the V 61 came sixth in them whilst not completing the whole course.

== Variants ==
V 59
240 hp (179 kW) BMW IV 6-cylinder water cooled inline engine. Four passengers.
V 61
400 hp (298 kW) Bristol Jupiter 9-cylinder radial engine. Estimated maximum speed 185 km/h (115 mph). Five passengers.

== Specifications (V 59) ==
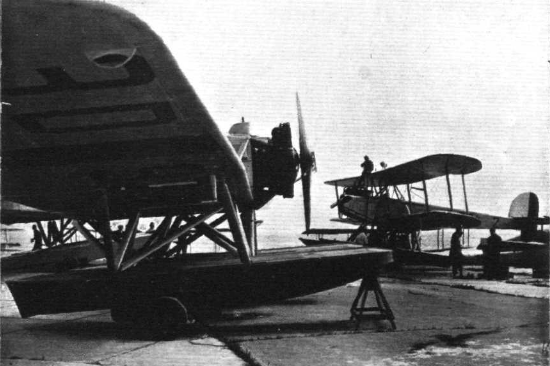
The LFG V 61 (foreground) and V 60 (right) at the 1926 German Seaplane Competition

Data from Flight 22 July 1926 pp.448-451

General characteristics

- Crew: 2
- Capacity: 4/5 passengers
- Wing area: 52 m^{2} (560 sq ft)
- Empty weight: 1,430 kg (3,153 lb)
- Gross weight: 2,200 kg (4,850 lb)
- Powerplant: 1 × BMW IV 6-cylinder inline water cooled, 180 kW (240 hp)

Performance

- Maximum speed: 151 km/h (94 mph, 82 kn)
