= Pfalz Flugzeugwerke =

1913–1919 aircraft manufacturer in Germany

- Industry: Aircraft manufacture
- Founded: June 13, 1913; 111 years ago in Speyer, Palatinate, Kingdom of Bavaria, Germany

Pfalz Flugzeugwerke was a World War I German aircraft manufacturer, located at the Speyer airfield in the Palatinate (German: Pfalz). They are best known for their series of fighters, notably the Pfalz D.III and Pfalz D.XII. The company went bankrupt after the Armistice, when the French occupation forces confiscated all of the equipment, but the factory was re-used by various other companies until re-forming in 1997. Today they are a parts manufacturer referred to as PFW.

== Early history ==
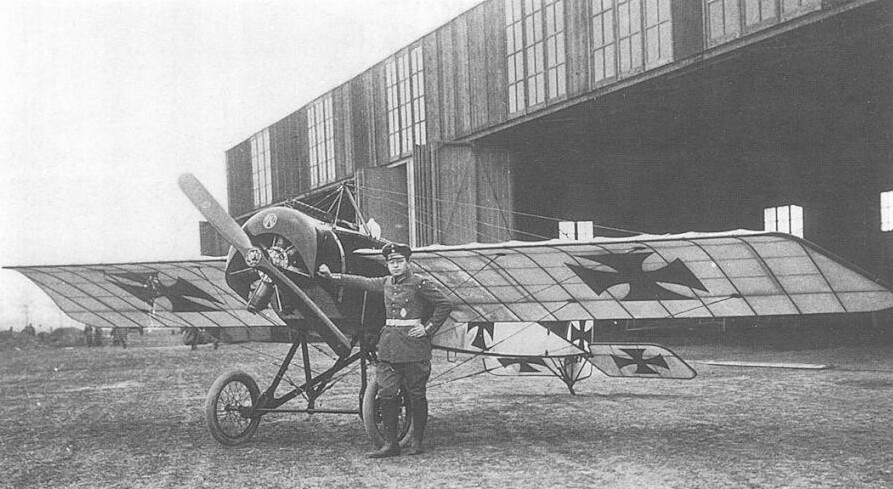
Pfalz E.I

Pfalz was the brainchild of Alfred Eversbusch, son of a foundry owner in Neustadt an der Weinstraße. It appears that he had built his own aircraft between 1912 and 1913, although the exact origin of the design is unclear. On June 3, 1913, the Pfalz company was registered, consisting of Alfred, his brother Ernst, and his brother-in-law Willy Sabersky-Müssigbrodt, as well as several investors: Richard and Eugen Kahn, and August Kahn (unrelated).

They initially proposed to build designs from Albatros, but their attempts at a deal amounted to nothing. Their next deal was with Gustav Otto Flugzeugwerke, building examples of his pusher-propeller biplane design. The original example was sent to Africa on a tour, and ended up being pressed into service as a scout.

The company had always planned to set up shop at the new airfield in Speyer, but they initially had problems securing land for a factory. The Gustav designs were actually built in the Speyer Festival Hall, which was unused at the time. It was not until February 6, 1914, that the city agreed to sell Pfalz 7,000 m² to build their factory. Construction was completed in July, only one month before the start of World War I.

== World War I ==
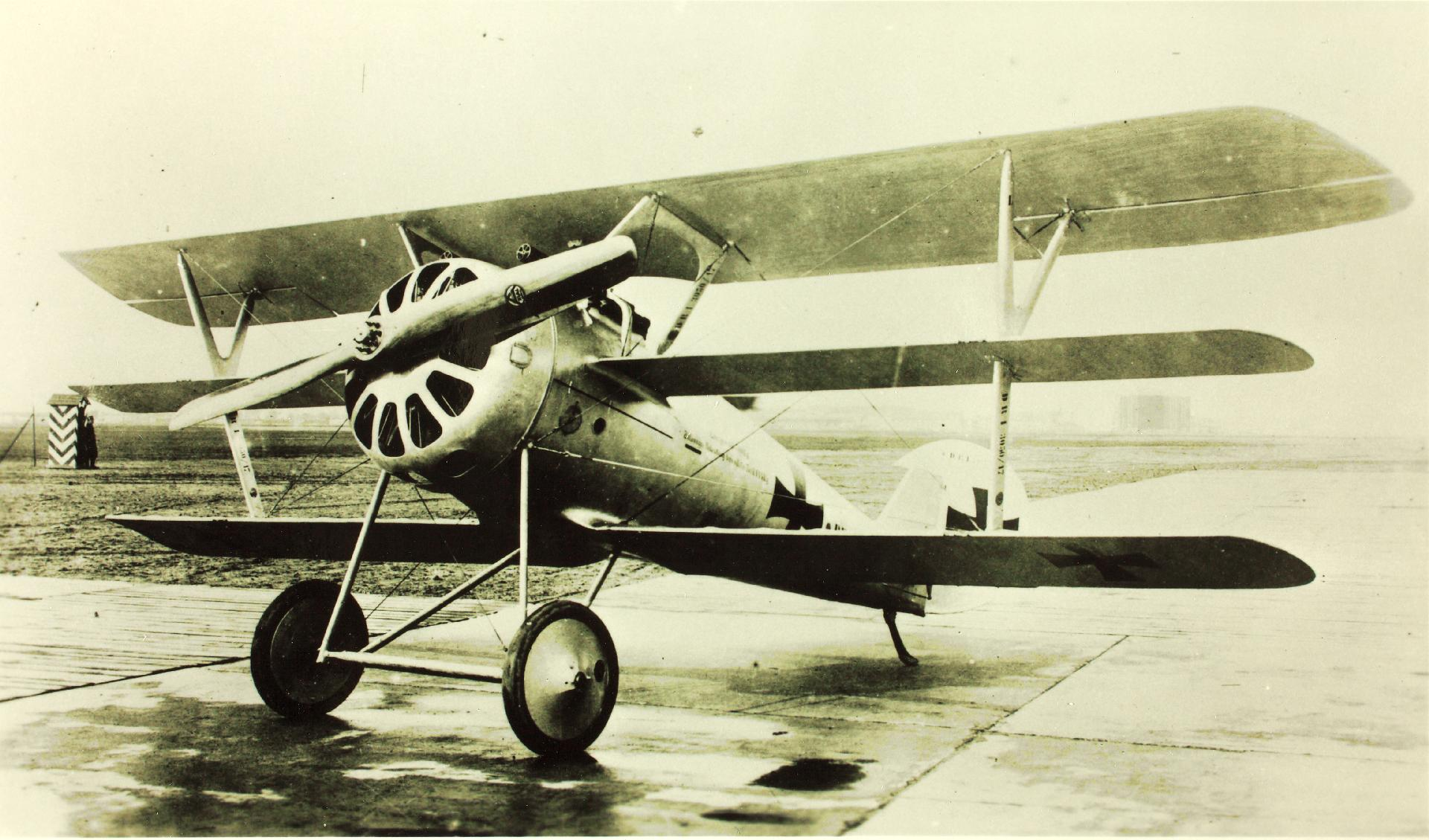
Pfalz Dr.I

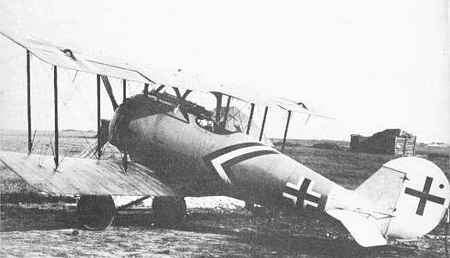
Pfalz D.VIII

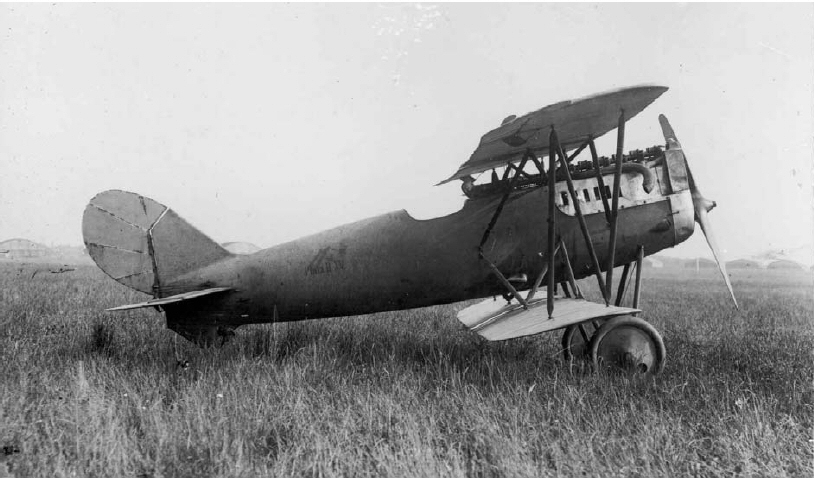
Pfalz D.XV

By this point, the company had arranged a license to produce Morane-Saulnier monoplanes, which were quickly put into German service. When these became uncompetitive on the Western Front, Pfalz shifted production to the LFG Roland D.I and D.II. The D.II was produced into late 1916, by which point it too was no longer competitive.

Instead of licensing another design, Pfalz instead licensed the previously patented Roland firm's Wickelrumpf (wrapped-fuselage) plywood strip-covered semi-monocoque fuselage design and combined it with the new 160 hp Mercedes D.III engine to create the Pfalz D.III. The D.III entered service in August 1917, but was not considered a match for contemporary designs like the Albatros D.V, and instead found a niche role in attacking observation balloons where its high diving speed was a major advantage. About 600 D.IIIs and slightly modified D.IIIas were built between its introduction in August and its replacement a year later. Many were still in service at that time, about 450.

Adaptations of the D.III with the new Siemens-Halske Sh.III rotary resulted in the Pfalz D.VIII, which featured an incredible rate of climb (which it shared with the other Sh. III powered fighter, the Siemens-Schuckert D.IV). The Sh. III proved to be rather unreliable due to the ersatz engine oil available, and only a small number of D.VIIIs were built. These did see front-line use by Jasta 2 (Jasta Boelcke) at least, although it is unclear how many were built in total.

The D.VIII was also adapted to triplane configuration as the Pfalz Dr.I for entry in the First Fighter Competition at Adlershof in January 1918. Like the D.VIII, it was powered by the Sh. III, and therefore completely outpowered its Oberursel UR.II powered contemporaries. Nevertheless, the Fokker Dr.I was the winner of the contest, which is not surprising considering that it was the only aircraft entered that was designed from the outset as a triplane, as opposed to being a quickly-adapted biplane. About a dozen Dr. Is were built and used operationally for some time.

The final major production model was the Pfalz D.XII, a development of the D.III that abandoned the sesquiplane configuration in favor of two-bay wings, similar in appearance to what looked like two-bay wings on the French SPAD fighters designed by Louis Béchereau. It entered the Second Fighter Competition in June 1918 against the famous Fokker E.V monoplane and other designs. Although generally similar to the Fokker D.VII in looks and performance, the D.XII was widely considered to be inferior in handling characteristics and difficult to land. Nevertheless, the D.XII was ordered into production, and about 800 were produced before the Armistice. Many of these survived the war and were taken as booty by the Allies. A few aircraft were eventually featured in various movies, notably Hell's Angels and The Dawn Patrol.

A derivative of the D.XII, the D.XIV, was not ordered into the production. Pfalz's final scout, the D.XV, participated in the Third Fighter Competition. The Idflieg ordered the D.XV into production just before the Armistice, but it did not see operational service.

== Interbellum ==
At the end of the war, the Pfalz factory fell into the French-occupied area, and was stripped of anything useful. On June 4, 1919, the company was re-established as A.G. Pfalz, which listed its main businesses as "shipbuilding, production, and the buying and selling of industrial goods." This company eventually went bankrupt during the Great Depression in 1932.

== World War II ==
On October 1, 1937 the factories once again turned to aircraft work, this time under the name Saarpfalz Flugwerke, a maintenance company. The Speyer airfield was no longer operational, so aircraft repaired there had to be transported to Mannheim-Neuostheim for flight, but the city decided to rebuild the airport over the next year and it re-opened in 1938.

The new company grew quickly, starting with over 200 employees by the end of 1937, growing to 500 by the start of the war, and to 1,500 by the time the war ended. They maintained many designs during this time, including the Focke-Wulf Fw 58, Heinkel He 45, He 46, He 51 and He 111, Junkers Ju 52, and Ju 88.

Work at the plants ended in March 1945 due to the approach of American and French troops.

== Ernst Heinkel, VFW and MBB ==
Ernst Heinkel introduced his famous bubblecar, the Heinkel Kabine, in 1955, receiving a roadworthiness certificate in February 1956. He soon purchased the Speyer plants for additional production capability, adding to the major assembly line in Karlsruhe. Given the location at the airfield, it appears he may have been planning to start aircraft production at Speyer as well.

Over the next five years, 3,800 Heinkelkabine's were produced at the Speyer plants, reaching 50 a day. However, Heinkel's death in 1958 ended any plans for expansion into aircraft, and in 1961 the two assembly lines were sold off to Ireland and Argentina.

In 1964 the remains of Heinkel, Focke Wulf and Weser Flugzeugbau merged to form VFW (and for a time, VFW-Fokker). The Speyer plants were then involved in production of the Transall C-160, building 169 of them. They also produced on parts for the UH-1 Iroquois and CH-53 Sea Stallion, produced under license by VFW. Some work was also carried out for other aviation companies, notably Messerschmitt-Bölkow-Blohm (MBB), Dornier, and the engine manufacturer MTU.

In 1983 MBB bought the Speyer factories and turned them into a primary helicopter repair center. MBB ran into financial difficulties, and merged with Deutsche Aerospace in 1989.

== Pfalz Flugzeugwerke reforms ==
On January 1, 1997 the Speyer plant was handed over to the remaining 523 employees, and once again renamed Pfalz Flugzeugwerke. They continue their work in helicopter maintenance to this day.

In 1996, the DASA factory was transferred into an employee-owned joint stock company. Three managers from the DASA factory took over the management. The company became a supplier for cargo loading systems, ducts and manifolds, as well as additional fuel tanks and fairings. On January 1, 1997 the Speyer plant was officially handed over to the remaining 523 employees, and the name of the first Speyer aircraft plant, Pfalz-Flugzeugwerke was again selected.

After one year (on January 22, 1998), the Mannheimer Morgen reported of a: 'fantastic morale among the employees at PFW.' There was no question about personnel cuts and, in the meantime, the number of employees had even been reinforced with temporary workers. There were 617 employees at the time and the planned turnover of 125 million DM had been achieved.

In 2001 the decision was made to sell shares to the Safeguard International Fund to acquire further capital and to meet the additional requirements of a rapidly growing aerospace market in the future. This step allowed a fast expansion especially in regard to the international market.

== Aircraft ==
- Pfalz D.III
- Pfalz D.VI
- Pfalz D.VII
- Pfalz D.VIII
- Pfalz D.XII
- Pfalz D.XV
- Pfalz Dr.I
