= Pfalz D.XV =

German single seat fighter aircraft

D.XV
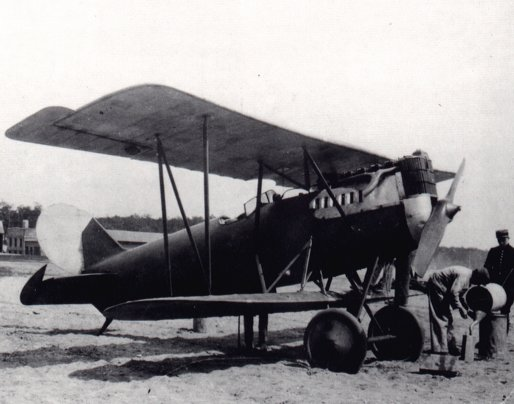
- D.XV (Spezial)

General information
- Type: Single seat fighter aircraft
- National origin: Germany
- Manufacturer: Pfalz Flugzeugwerke
- Number built: More than 2

History
- First flight: Summer 1918

The Pfalz D.XV was a German single seat fighter aircraft which was approved for production right at the end of World War I, too late to enter service.

== Design and development ==
The D.XV was last of the series of biplane fighters and notably different from their earlier aircraft, with both mainplanes clear of the fuselage and without flying wires. The lower wing was the smaller of the two both in span and chord and had elliptical tips. The upper wing was square tipped and fitted with ailerons. Both were single piece from tip to tip. Outward leaning N-form struts defined the D.XV as a single bay biplane; groups of short struts from the mid and upper fuselage joined it to the upper wing and similar groups attached the lower plane.

The D.XV had a BMW IIIa water-cooled 6-cylinder inline engine of 185 hp (138 kW), with a rectangular radiator filling the upper nose above the drive-shaft of the two-bladed propeller. Aft, the fuselage was rounded in cross-section with the open cockpit behind the upper wing's trailing edge. The empennage was mounted at mid-fuselage, D-shaped in plan and with balanced elevators. The fin was triangular and carried a short, curved, balanced rudder. The D.XV's fixed conventional undercarriage was of the fixed axle type, the axle ends supported on pairs of V-struts and wire cross-braced; there was a tall tail skid.

The D.XV was developed over the summer of 1918 and versions with unbalanced ailerons (D.XVf) and overhung, balanced ailerons (D.XV (Spezial). The 180 hp (130 kW) Daimler DIIIa engine was also considered. The Pfalz took part in the third D-type trial, held in October 1918. It was judged to have high performance and manoeuvrability, though tail heavy and hard to land. It was one of the last German fighters accepted for production, getting its type approval on 4 November 1918, just a few days before the Armistice. Because it was approved for production so late, the Pfalz XV never reached operational status. Several were built and there were 74 completed fuselages in the Pfalz works when these were inspected by the Allies in the autumn of 1919.

== Variants ==
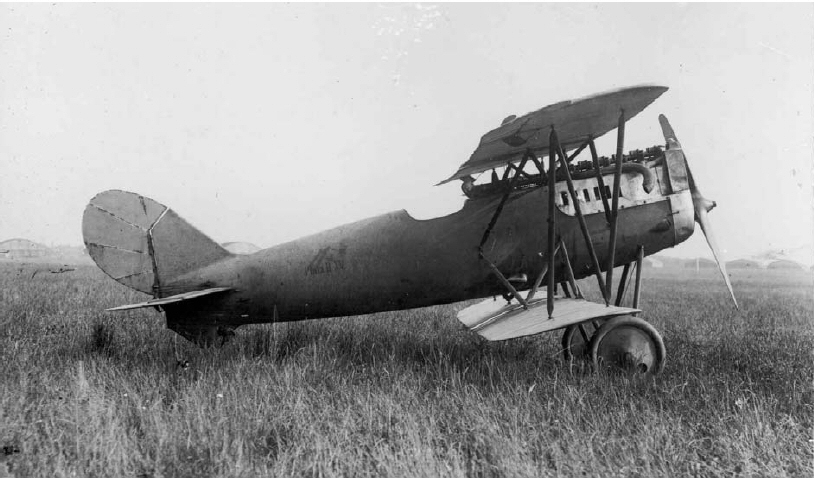
Pfalz D.XVf

D.XVf
aerodynamically unbalanced ailerons
D.XV (Spezial)
overhung, balanced ailerons

== Specifications ==
Data from Green & Swanborough

General characteristics

- Crew: One
- Length: 6.50 m (21 ft 4 in)
- Wingspan: 8.60 m (28 ft 3 in)
- Height: 2.70 m (8 ft 10 in)
- Wing area: 20.00 m^{2} (215.3 sq ft)
- Empty weight: 738 kg (1,627 lb)
- Gross weight: 918 kg (2,024 lb)
- Powerplant: 1 × BMW IIIa 6-cylinder water-cooled inline engine, 138 kW (185 hp)
- Propellers: 2-bladed

Performance

- Maximum speed: 203 km/h (126 mph, 110 kn) at 4,000 m (13,000 ft)
- Endurance: 1.5 hr
- Time to altitude: 2.0 min to 1,000 m (3,300 ft)
