= LFG Roland D.IV =

1910s German fighter aircraft prototype

D.IV
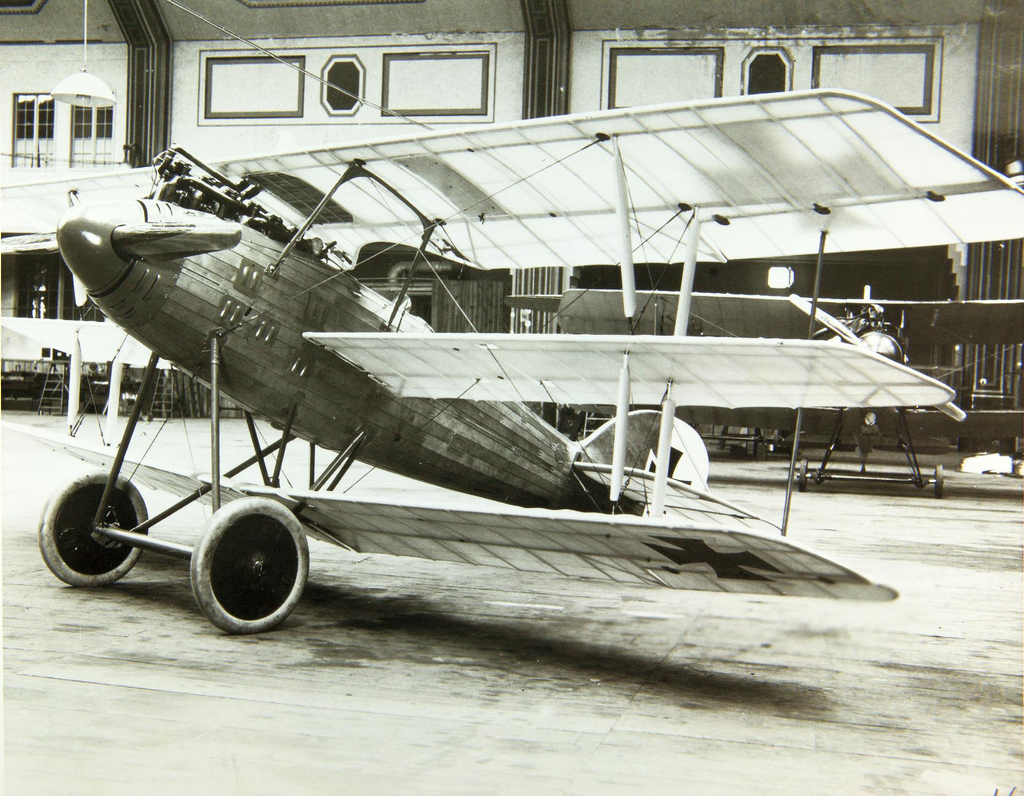

General information
- Type: Single seat fighter aircraft
- National origin: Germany
- Manufacturer: LFG Roland (Luft-Fahrzeug-Gesellschaft)
- Number built: 1

History
- First flight: mid-1917

The LFG Roland D.IV, later redesignated LFG Roland Dr.I was a German single engine, single seat triplane fighter flown in mid-1917. It produced no performance or operational advantages over existing types and only one was built.

== Design and development ==
The D.IV was a single bay triplane with equally spaced, staggered wings; only the lowest had dihedral. The central plane was mounted at mid-fuselage and the others passed above and below the fuselage, supported by centre section struts. The wings were two spar structures and decreased in chord from top to bottom, so the interplane struts were not parallel but leant longitudinally apart. In plan the fabric covered wings were almost rectangular, apart from angled tips; their span decreased a little from top to bottom but all carried externally interconnected, short span ailerons. There was a small circular cut-out in the trailing edge of the upper wing above the cockpit to enhance the pilot's view.

The fuselage of the D.IV, like those of their earlier fighter designs, was a wooden monocoque but LFG abandoned their earlier Wickelrumpfe (wrapped fuselage) approach, which used thin bands of spruce veneer reinforced with fabric, in favour of a cheaper Klinkerrumpf (clinker fuselage) which followed boat building practice with overlapping spruce strips over a light wooden internal framework. It was oval in cross-section, though the six cylinder, water-cooled upright inline Mercedes D.III was mounted with its cylinders and exhaust exposed above it, driving a two blade propeller with a large spinner. The fuselage tapered behind the open cockpit, where an unswept straight edged, blunt angle tipped tailplane, mounted on top of the fuselage, carried separate, tapered elevators. The vertical tail was rounded, with a rudder that extended below the tailplane to the keel. The conventional undercarriage had mainwheels on a single axle, supported by long V-struts to the lower fuselage, together with a short tailskid.

The single prototype ordered by Idflieg was tested during the Summer of 1917 but was badly damaged at the end of September. LFG rebuilt it using a similar Klinkerrumf intended for a D.VI biplane fighter and testing was soon resumed. It was decided that the Dr.I, as it was now known, showed no particular advantages over existing German fighters and development was abandoned.

== Specifications ==
Data from Green and Swanborough p.338

General characteristics

- Crew: One
- Length: 7.32 m (24 ft 0 in)
- Wingspan: 9.45 m (31 ft 0 in)
- Empty weight: 930 kg (2,050 lb)
- Gross weight: 1,208 kg (2,663 lb)
- Powerplant: 1 × Mercedes D.III 6-cylinder, water-cooled, upright inline, 120 kW (160 hp)
- Propellers: 2-bladed

Performance

- Maximum speed: 155 km/h (96 mph, 84 kn)
- Service ceiling: 6,000 m (20,000 ft)

Armament

- Guns: 2× synchronised 7.9 mm (0.31 in) LMG 08/15 machine guns

== Bibliography ==
- Gray, Peter & Thetford, Owen (1987) [1970]. German Aircraft of the First World War (2nd ed.). Putnam. ISBN 0-85177-809-7.
- Green, William & Swanborough, Gordon (2001) [1994]. The Complete Book of Fighters: An Illustrated Encyclopedia of Every Fighter Built and Flown (Revised and Updated ed.). Salamander Books. ISBN 1-84065-269-1.
- Herris, Jack (2014). Roland Aircraft of WWI: A Centennial Perspective on Great War Airplanes. Great War Aviation Centennial Series. Vol. 9. Aeronaut Books. ISBN 978-1-935881-20-9.
