= LFG Roland D.VI =

1910s German fighter aircraft

D.VI
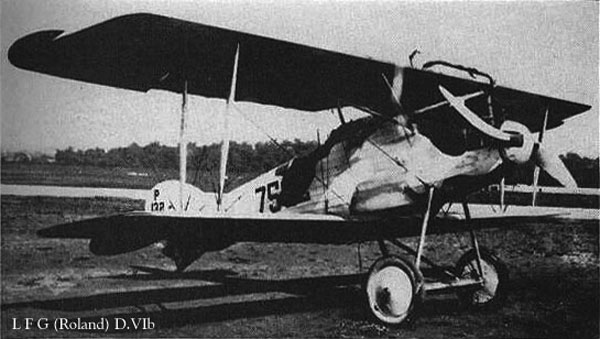
- D.VIb

General information
- Type: Fighter
- Manufacturer: LFG Roland
- Primary user: Imperial Germany
- Number built: 350

History
- First flight: 1917

The Roland D.VI was a German fighter aircraft built at the end of World War I. It lost a fly-off to the Fokker D.VII, but production went ahead anyway as insurance against problems with the Fokker.

== Design and development ==
The Roland D.VI was designed by the Luft-Fahrzeug-Gesellschaft (L.F.G.), (whose aircraft were made under the trade name "Roland" after 1914 to avoid confusion with the Luftverkehrsgesellschaft m.b.H (L.V.G.)) late in 1917, with the prototype being the 1000th aircraft to be built by L.F.G., first flying in November 1917. The D.VI was a single bay biplane which discarded the L.F.G.-Roland patented Wickelrumpf (literally "wrapped body"), or semi-monocoque fuselage, constructed with two layers of thin plywood strips, diagonally wrapped around a male form to create a "half-shell", that used in previous L.F.G aircraft such as the Roland C.II, D.I and D.II in favour of the equally unusual (for aircraft use) Klinkerrumpf (or clinker-built) construction where the fuselage was built of overlapping thin strips of spruce over a light wooden framework. Visibility for the pilot was good, while the aircraft had above average manoeuvrability.

== Operational history ==
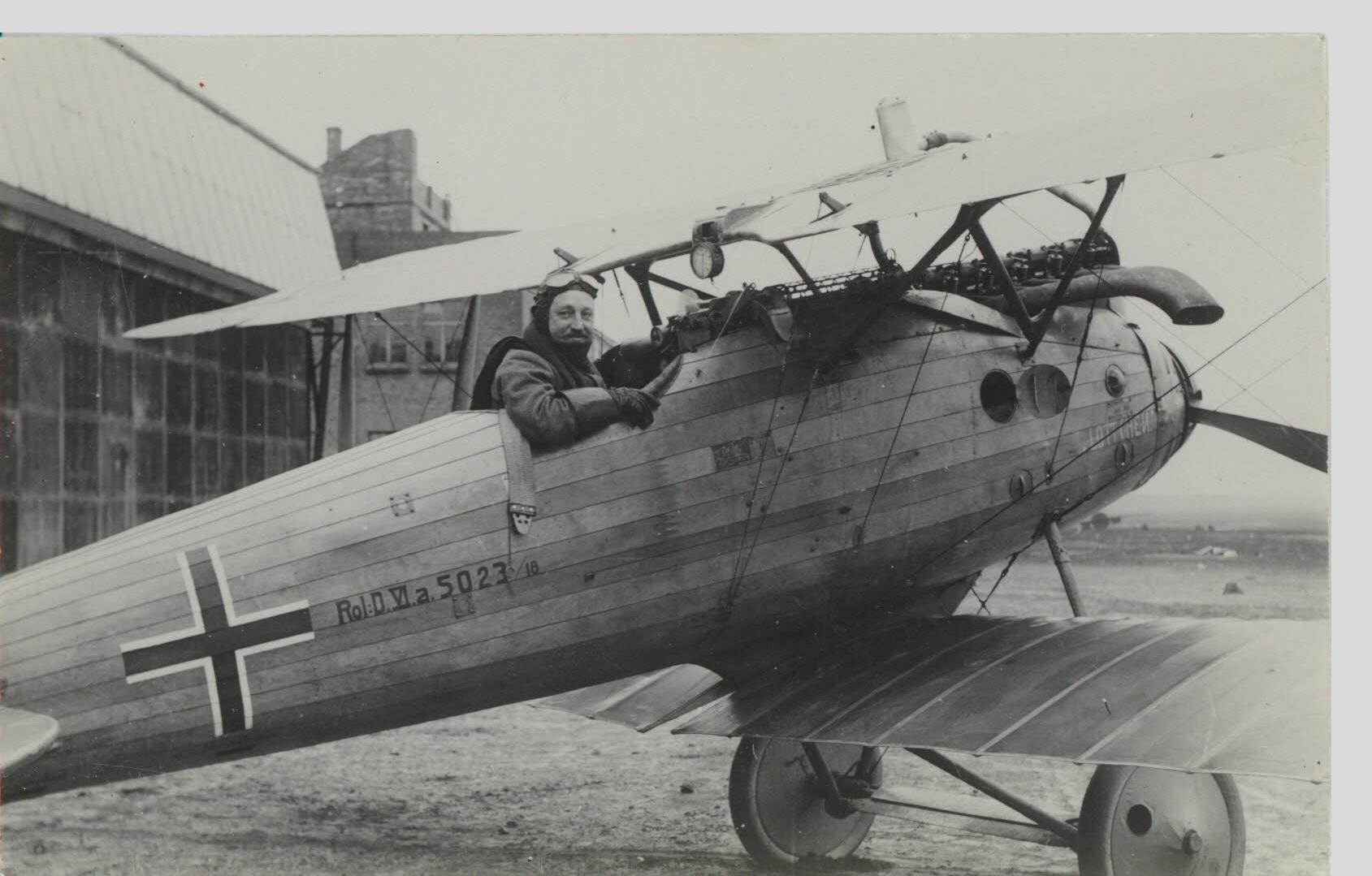
Mercedes-powered Roland D.VIa

In January 1918, two D.VIs were entered into the first fighter competition held by Idflieg at Adlershof, one powered by a 160 hp (119 kW) Mercedes D.III engine and the other by a Benz Bz.IIIa of similar power and, like the Mercedes, another upright, inline, six cylinder engine . Although the winner of the competition was the cheaper Fokker D.VII, orders were placed for the Roland as insurance against production problems with the Fokker.

A total of 350 were built, 150 D.VIas powered by the Mercedes, while the remaining 200 were powered by the Benz and were called D.VIb. Deliveries started in May 1918, with 70 D.VIs in frontline service on 31 August 1918.

The only surviving artifact of the LFG Roland D.VI still existing in the 21st century is the complete fuselage of a D.VIb, displaying IdFlieg military serial number 2225/18, on display at the Polish Aviation Museum in Kraków, Poland.

== Operators ==
First Czechoslovak Republic

- Czechoslovak Air Force

German Empire

- Luftstreitkräfte
- Kaiserliche Marine
- Freikorps

== Specifications (Roland D.VIb) ==
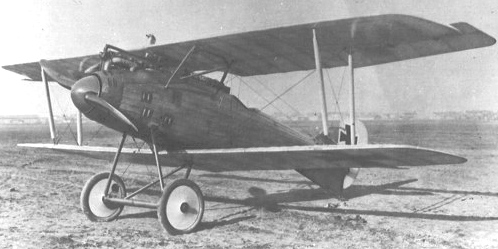
Roland D.VI

Data from The Complete Book of Fighters

General characteristics

- Crew: 1
- Length: 6.32 m (20 ft 9 in)
- Wingspan: 9.42 m (30 ft 11 in)
- Height: 2.8 m (9 ft 2 in)
- Wing area: 22.1 m^{2} (238 sq ft)
- Empty weight: 656 kg (1,446 lb)
- Gross weight: 846 kg (1,865 lb)
- Powerplant: 1 × Benz Bz.IIIa 6-cylinder water-cooled in-line piston engine, 149 kW (200 hp)
- Propellers: 2-bladed fixed-pitch propeller

Performance

- Maximum speed: 199 km/h (124 mph, 107 kn)
- Service ceiling: 5,790 m (19,000 ft)
- Time to altitude: 5,000 m (16,000 ft) in 19 minutes
- Wing loading: 38.3 kg/m^{2} (7.8 lb/sq ft)
- Power/mass: 0.18 kW/kg (0.11 hp/lb)

Armament

- Guns: 2 × 7.92 mm LMG 08/15 machine guns

== See also ==
Aircraft of comparable role, configuration, and era

- Fokker D.VII
- Pfalz D.XII

== Bibliography ==
- Abbott, Dan S. & Grosz, Peter M. (1977). "The Benighted Rolands". Air Enthusiast (3): 38–48. ISSN 0143-5450.
- Gray, Peter and Owen Thetford. German Aircraft of the First World War. London: Putnam, 1962.
- Gray, Peter Laurence. German Aircraft of the First World War. Garden City, N.Y.: Doubleday & Co., 1970.
- Green, William and Gordon Swanborough. The Complete Book of Fighters. New York: Smithmark, 1994. ISBN 0-8317-3939-8.
- Herris, Jack (2014). Roland Aircraft of WWI: A Centennial Perspective on Great War Airplanes. Great War Aviation Centennial Series. Vol. 9. Aeronaut Books. ISBN 978-1-935881-20-9.
