= LFG V 42 =

1920s German sports aircraft

V 42

General information
- Type: Two-seat sports aircraft
- National origin: Germany
- Manufacturer: LFG (Luft-Fahrzeug-Gesellschaft)
- Number built: 1

History
- First flight: 1925

The V 42 was a one off, single-engine, two-seat sports monoplane, built in Germany in 1925.

== Design and development ==
Broadly similar to but larger and nearly 30% heavier than the LFG V 40 and LFG V 44, the V 42 was an all-metal cantilever high-wing monoplane. Unlike the V 40 and V 44 it was powered by an inline engine rather than a radial, the 100 hp (75 kW) Mercedes D.I.

== Operational history ==
The V 42 was amongst five LFG entries to the Round Germany Flight held in the summer of 1925, though only the LFG V 39 took take part.

== Specifications ==
Data from Flight 28 May 1925 p.324

General characteristics

- Crew: One
- Capacity: One passenger
- Wingspan: 12.6 m (41 ft 4 in)
- Wing area: 24 m^{2} (260 sq ft)
- Gross weight: 1,069 kg (2,357 lb)
- Powerplant: 1 × Mercedes D.I 6-cylinder water-cooled inline, 75 kW (100 hp)

Performance

- Maximum speed: 145 km/h (90 mph, 78 kn)
- Landing speed: 68 km/h (43 mph)
