= BMW IV =

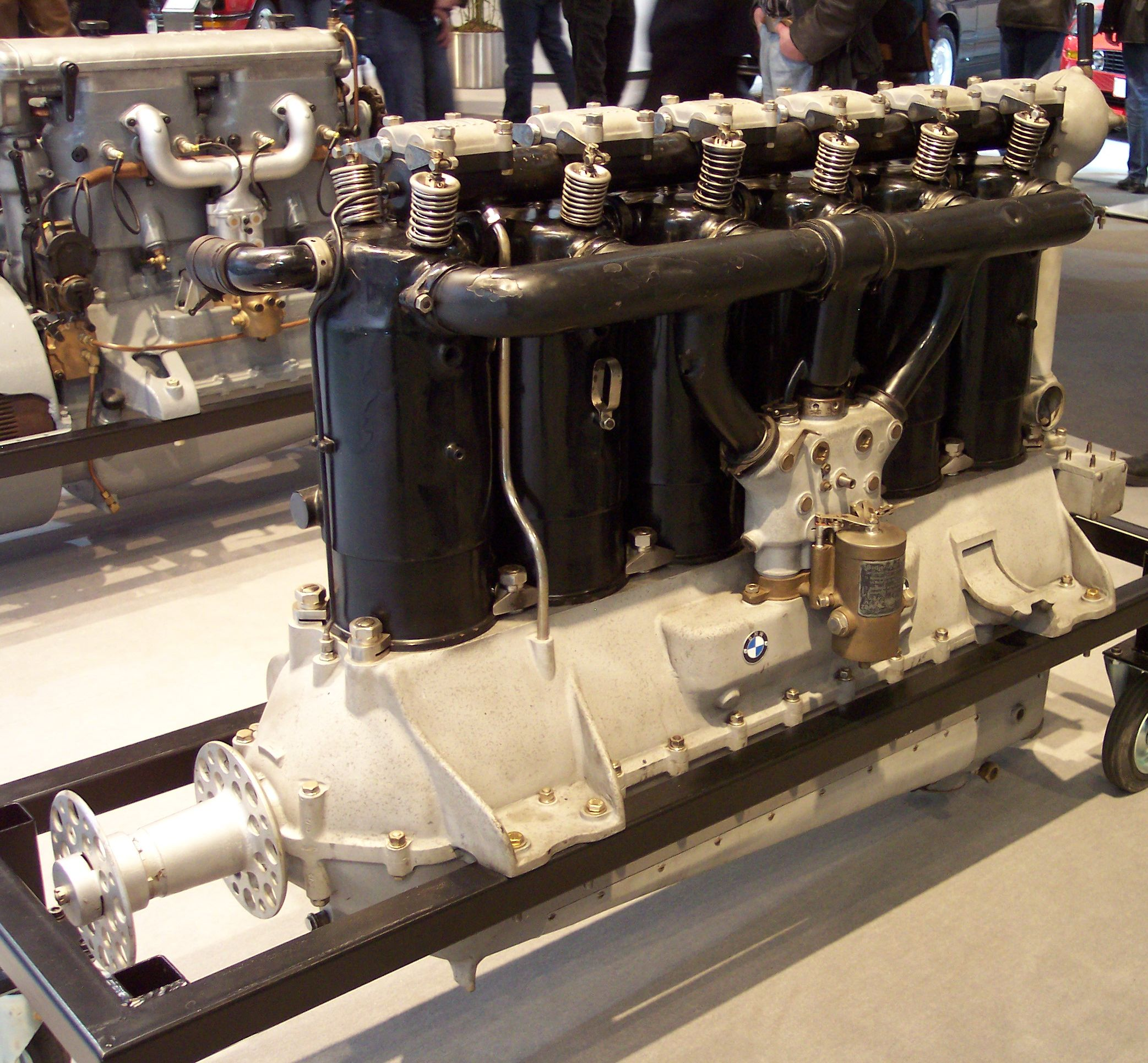
- Preserved BMW IVa
- Type: Inline engine
- Manufacturer: BMW
- First run: 1919
- Developed into: BMW V; BMW VI

The BMW IV was a six-cylinder, water-cooled inline aircraft engine built in Germany in the 1920s. Power was in the 180 kW (250 hp) range.

== World record ==
On 17 June 1919 Franz Zeno Diemer flew a DFW F37, powered by a BMW IV engine to an unofficial world record height of 9,760 m (32,021 ft) from Oberwiesenfeld, reaching that altitude in 89 minutes. Diemer stated at the time, "I could have gone much higher, but I didn't have enough oxygen."

== Applications ==
- Arado SC I
- Albatros L 72
- Albatros L 74
- Caspar C 27
- DFW F37
- Heinkel HD 22
- Heinkel HD 24
- Heinkel HD 39
- Junkers A 35
- Junkers F 13
- LFG V 59
- LFG V 60
- Polikarpov R-1 BMW (Soviet unlicensed copy of Airco DH.9A)
- Kalinin K-Series
- Rohrbach Ro VII Robbe
- Rohrbach Ro VIII Roland I
- Type 91 Heavy Tank
- Type 95 Heavy Tank

== Specifications ==
Data from BMW Type IV description and user manual.

=== General characteristics ===
- Type: Six-cylinder inline piston engine
- Bore: 160 mm (6.30 in)
- Stroke: 190 mm (7.48 in)
- Displacement: 22.92 L (1,399 cu in)
- Dry weight: 290 kg (640 lb)

=== Components ===
- Valvetrain: Overhead camshaft, two valves per cylinder
- Cooling system: Water-cooled

=== Performance ===
- Power output: Nominal 230 PS (227 hp; 169 kW) , maximum continuous 250 PS (247 hp; 184 kW)
- Compression ratio: 5.5:1

== See also ==
Comparable engines

- Liberty L-6 (United States)

Related lists

- List of aircraft engines
