= LFG Roland D.II =

1910s German fighter aircraft

Roland D.II
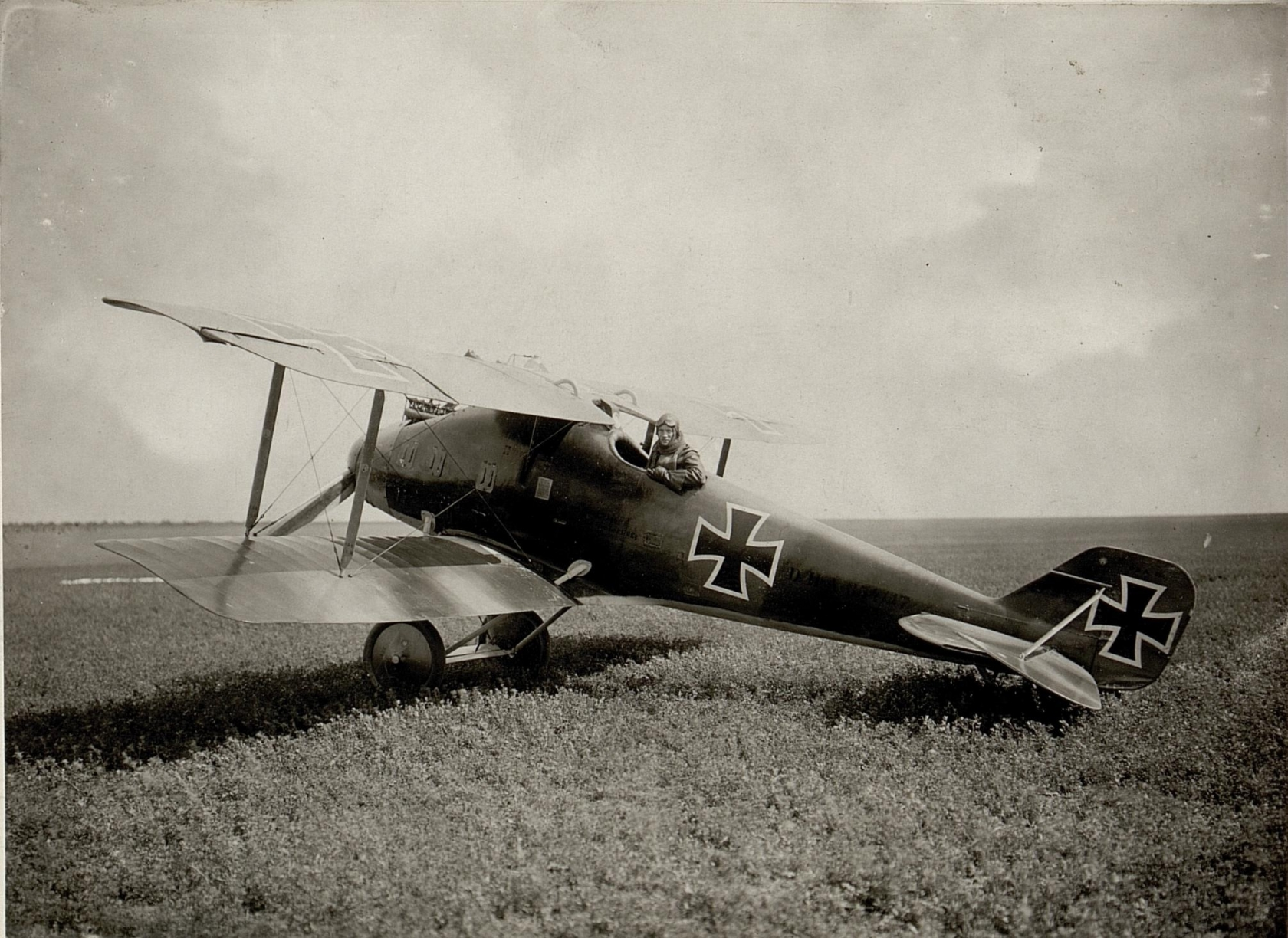

General information
- Type: Fighter
- Manufacturer: Luft-Fahrzeug-Gesellschaft, Pfalz
- Number built: 300

History
- Introduction date: Early 1917
- First flight: October 1916
- Developed from: Roland D.I

The LFG Roland D.II was a German single-seat fighter of World War I. The type was manufactured by Luftfahrzeug Gesellschaft, and also by Pfalz Flugzeugwerke under license.

== Design and development ==
The D.II used a plywood monocoque fuselage. Two layers of plywood strips were spirally wrapped in opposing directions over a mold to form one half of a fuselage shell. The fuselage halves were then glued together, covered with a layer of fabric, and doped. This design, which was known as the Wickelrumpf, allowed the creation of a smooth, strong and light structure. The upper wing was attached to the fuselage by means of a large central pylon, greatly impairing the pilot's forward vision. Armament consisted of twin "Spandau" LMG 08/15 machine guns buried in the fuselage decking.

The D.II was initially powered by a 160 hp Mercedes D.III engine, giving a top speed of 105 mph at sea level. Later aircraft, designated D.IIa, were powered by a 180 hp Argus As.III. The As.III offered poor performance above 3,000 m and the D.IIa was mostly relegated to operations on the Eastern Front.

Nicknamed Haifisch (shark) for its sleek appearance, the D.II and D.IIa proved generally unpopular in service due to poor fields of view and heavy controls. It was quite fast and strong, but had mediocre manoeuvrability and handling. However, it is also reported that the aircraft had particularly sensitive controls, particularly in the yawing plane. The type is known to have been used by Jasta 25 at their Canatlarzi base in Macedonia in 1917.

== Variants ==
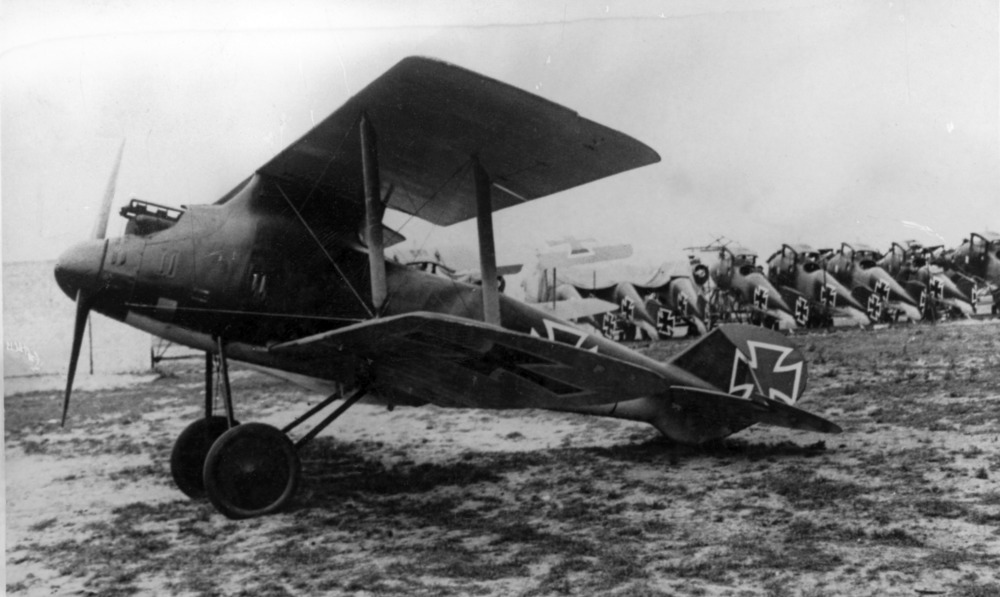
LFG Roland C.V

- D.II: Single-seat fighter-scout biplane, powered by a 160 hp (119 kW) Mercedes D.III piston engine.
- D.IIa: Single-seat fighter-scout biplane, powered by a 180 hp (134 kW) Argus As.III piston engine.
- C.V: One-off two seat derivative with a 160 hp (119 kW) Mercedes D.III engine.
- Pfalz D.II/D.IIa: aircraft licence-built by Pfalz Flugzeugwerke, from February 1917 renamed Roland D.II/D.IIa (Pfal). There were built 100 D.II (s/n 2830-2929/16) and 100 D.IIa (s/n 300-399/17).

== Operators ==
Bulgaria

- Bulgarian Air Force

German Empire

- Luftstreitkräfte
  - Jasta 25
  - Jasta 27
  - Jasta 32
- Kaiserliche Marine

== Specifications (D.II) ==
Data from German Aircraft of the First World War

General characteristics

- Crew: 1
- Length: 6.93 m (22 ft 9 in)
- Wingspan: 8.94 m (29 ft 4 in)
- Height: 3.11 m (10 ft 2 in)
- Wing area: 22.8 m^{2} (245 sq ft)
- Empty weight: 715 kg (1,576 lb)
- Gross weight: 954 kg (2,103 lb)
- Powerplant: 1 × Mercedes D.III 6-cylinder water-cooled in-line piston engine, 119 kW (160 hp)
- Propellers: 2-bladed fixed-pitch propeller

Performance

- Maximum speed: 180 km/h (110 mph, 97 kn)
- Endurance: 2 hours
- Service ceiling: 5,000 m (16,000 ft)
- Time to altitude: 5,000 m (16,000 ft) in 23 minutes

Armament

- Guns: 2 × 7.92 mm LMG 08/15 machine guns

== See also ==
Related development

- LFG Roland C.II
- LFG Roland D.I
- LFG Roland D.III
- Pfalz D.III

Aircraft of comparable role, configuration, and era

- Albatros D.II
- Albatros D.III
- Siemens-Schuckert D.I
- Nieuport 17
- Spad VII
- Airco DH-2
- Sopwith Pup

Related lists

- List of military aircraft of Germany

== Bibliography ==
- Anderson, Lennart (November–December 2019). "La renaissance de l'aviation militair bulgare dans les années vingt" [The Rebirth of Bulgarian Military Aviation in the Twenties]. Avions (in French) (232): 52–66. ISSN 1243-8650.
- Angelucci, Enzo (editor). World Encyclopedia of Military Aircraft. London: Jane's, 1981. ISBN 0-7106-0148-4.
- Cowin, H. W. German and Austrian Aviation of World War I. Oxford: Osprey Publishing, 2000. ISBN 1-84176-069-2.
- Donald, David (editor). The Encyclopedia of World Aircraft. London: Blitz, 1997. ISBN 1-85605-375-X.
- Gray, Peter & Thetford, Owen (1987) [1970]. German Aircraft of the First World War (2nd ed.). Putnam. ISBN 0-85177-809-7.
- Green, William & Swanborough, Gordon (2001) [1994]. The Complete Book of Fighters: An Illustrated Encyclopedia of Every Fighter Built and Flown (Revised and Updated ed.). Salamander Books. ISBN 1-84065-269-1.
- Herris, Jack (2014). Roland Aircraft of WWI: A Centennial Perspective on Great War Airplanes. Great War Aviation Centennial Series. Vol. 9. Aeronaut Books. ISBN 978-1-935881-20-9.
