= LFG V 13 =

1920s German seaplane airliner

V 13 Strela

General information
- Type: Floatplane airliner
- National origin: Germany
- Manufacturer: LFG

History
- First flight: ca. 1921

The LFG V 13 Strela (named for the Strelasund off Rügen) was a seaplane airliner produced in small quantities in Germany in the early 1920s. It was a conventional, three-bay biplane with an enclosed cabin for four passengers. The original design featured twin pontoons, but a landplane version was developed as the V 130.

The V 13s were operated by Luft-Fahrzeug on its Hamburg-Stettin-Danzig and Stettin-Swinemünde-Stralsund routes. These services were later shared by V 13s operated by Luftverkehr Pommern and later were absorbed into Deutsche Luft Hansa. In Norway, Norske Luftruter operated two second-hand V 13s until the late 1920s.

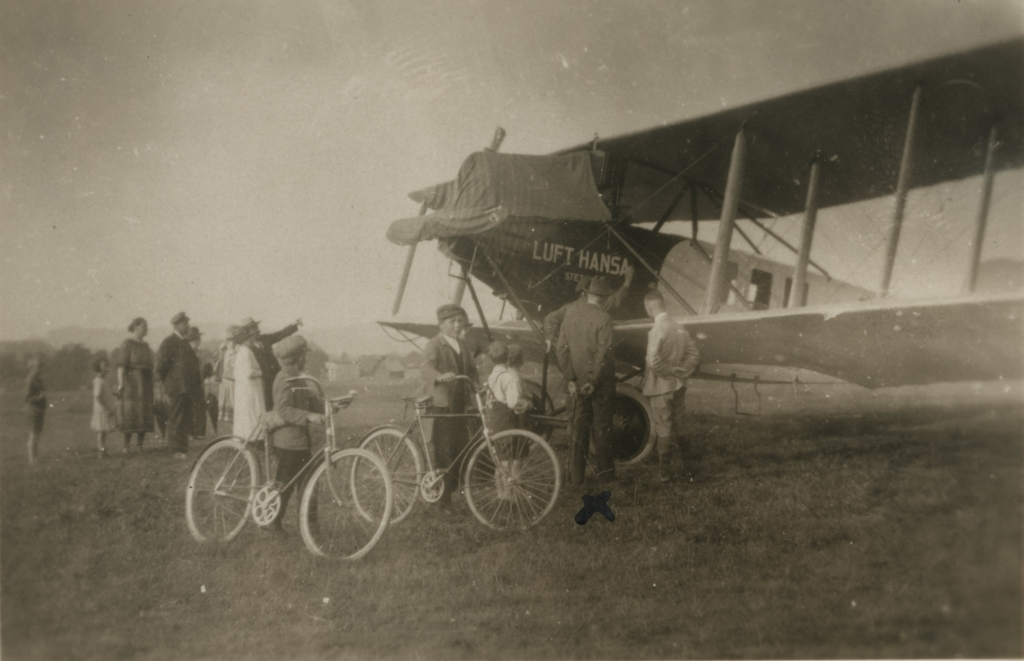
LFG V 130 of Deutsche Luft Hansa

== Specifications (V 13) ==
General characteristics

- Crew: One pilot
- Capacity: 4 passengers
- Length: 10.90 m (35 ft 9 in)
- Wingspan: 17.50 m (57 ft 5 in)
- Height: 3.88 m (12 ft 9 in)
- Wing area: 70.0 m^{2} (753 sq ft)
- Empty weight: 1,460 kg (3,210 lb)
- Gross weight: 2,120 kg (4,660 lb)
- Powerplant: 1 × Benz Bz.IIIa , 134 kW (180 hp)

Performance

- Maximum speed: 135 km/h (84 mph, 73 kn)
- Stall speed: 120 km/h (75 mph, 65 kn)
- Range: 720 km (450 mi, 390 nmi)
- Service ceiling: 3,500 m (11,500 ft)
- Rate of climb: 1.7 m/s (330 ft/min)
