= LFG V 60 =

1920s German floatplane trainer

V 60
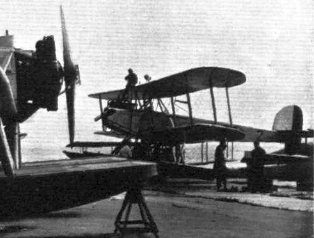

General information
- Type: Floatplane training aircraft
- National origin: Germany
- Manufacturer: LFG (Luft-Fahrzeug-Gesellschaft)
- Number built: 4 or 5

History
- First flight: 1926

The LFG V 60 was a small, single engine, tandem seat floatplane training aircraft, designed and built in Germany in the mid-1920s. About five were constructed.

== Design and development ==
The LFG V 60 was a biplane floatplane, with wings of constant chord and with rounded wing tips; they were of approximately equal span and mounted with little stagger. It was a two bay biplane with pairs of parallel interplane struts, though the inner bay was quite narrow. There were ailerons on both upper and lower planes, externally connected.

Its engine was a 172 kW (230 hp) six cylinder inline, water cooled BMW IV, mounted with its cylinder heads exposed, which drove a two blade propeller. The fuselage was flat sided and accommodated the two crew in a continuous open, tandem cockpit. The tailplane was mounted on top of the fuselage and the vertical tail was tall and rounded, the rudder extending below the keel. The V 60 had twin float landing gear attached to the wing and lower fuselage on a number of V-struts and laterally cross braced.

== Operational history ==
One V 60 was entered into the German Seaplane Competition held in July 1926 on the Baltic coast. During one flight the pilot, Haase, put down on the sea to make some adjustment but was swept away. The aircraft and its passenger were rescued.

Two other V 60s were registered to DVS GmbH early in 1928.

== Operators ==
- DVS GmbH

== Specifications ==
Data from Flight 22 July 1926, p.449 and Flight 29 July 1926, p.465

General characteristics

- Crew: Two
- Length: 10.5 m (34 ft 5 in)
- Wingspan: 15.0 m (49 ft 3 in)
- Wing area: 52 m^{2} (560 sq ft)
- Empty weight: 1,350 kg (2,976 lb)
- Gross weight: 2,050 kg (4,519 lb)
- Powerplant: 1 × BMW IV 6-cylinder water cooled inline, 170 kW (230 hp)
- Propellers: 2-bladed

Performance

- Maximum speed: 152 km/h (94 mph, 82 kn)
- Range: 906 km (563 mi, 489 nmi)
- Time to altitude: 9.05 min from 3,281 ft (1,000 m) to 3,281 ft (1,000 m)
- Landing speed: 46 mph (74 km/h)
- Fuel consumption: 0.238 kg/km (0.843 lb/mi)
