= LFG Roland D.I =

D.I
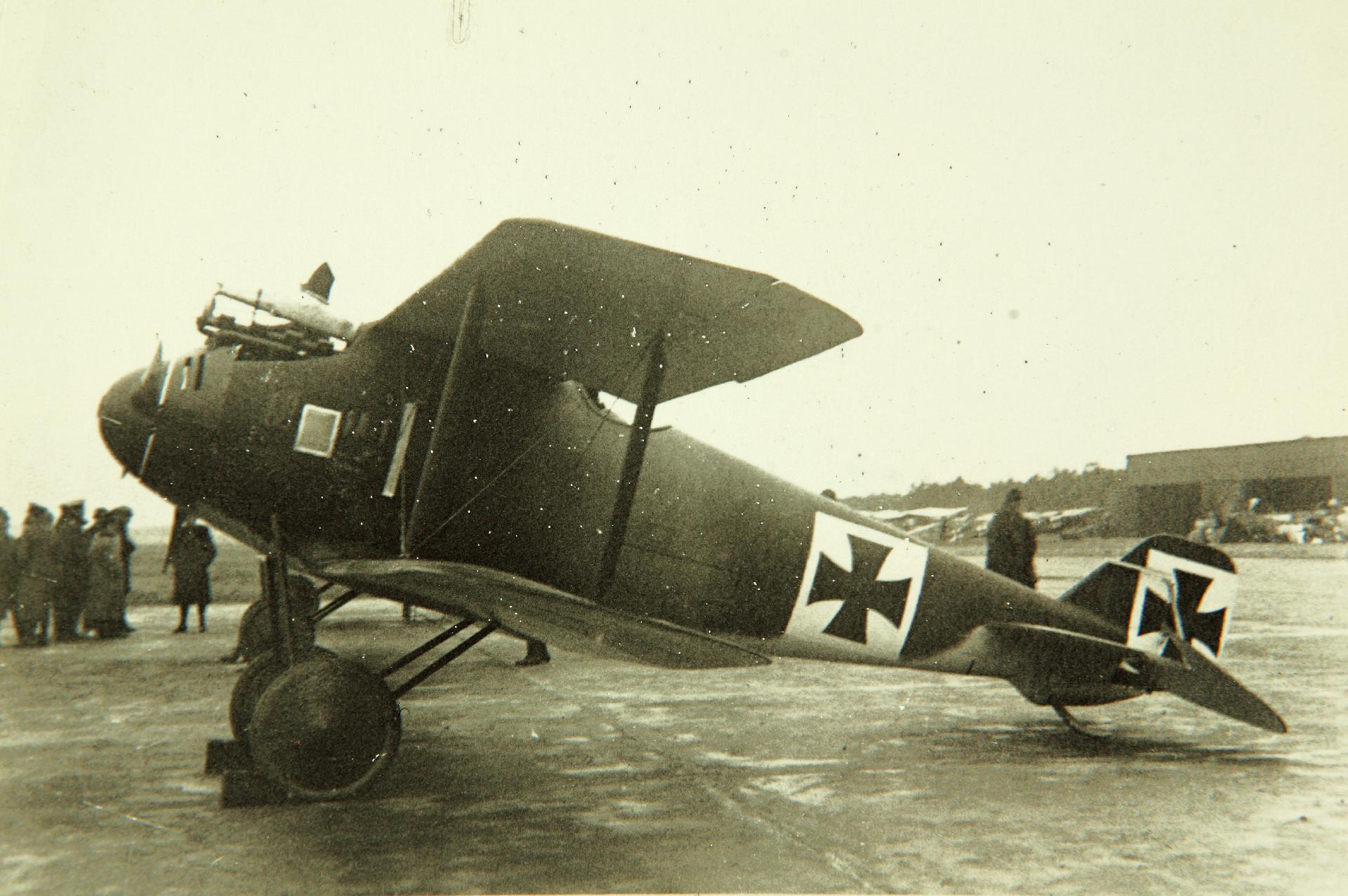

General information
- Type: Fighter
- National origin: Germany
- Manufacturer: LFG, Pfalz
- Designer: Dipl Ing Tantzen
- Primary user: Luftstreitkräfte
- Number built: ca. 20

History
- First flight: July 1916

The LFG Roland D.I was a German fighter designed by Luft-Fahrzeug-Gesellschaft (LFG) during World War I. It was a single-seat aircraft based originally on the Roland C.II two-seat reconnaissance type. It shared its predecessor's unusual design feature of having a deep fuselage that completely filled the interplane gap, but in comparison, the fuselage was much sleeker. While the C.II's appearance had earned the Walfisch ("Whale"), the D.I became known as the Haifisch ("Shark"). The I-struts that had been used to brace the C.II's wing were replaced by more conventional struts. Other changes to the wing included the removal of stagger from the design and the introduction of slight sweepback.

The prototype flew in July 1916 and was accepted by the Idflieg for military service. Production was interrupted, however, by a fire at the factory after only around twenty machines had been built. When production eventually resumed, it was of the improved Roland D.II.

== Variants ==
LFG Roland D.I
The standard fighter.
Roland D.I (Pfal)
D.I production from Pfalz. Originally designated Pfalz D.I. Twenty aircraft licence-built by Pfalz Flugzeugwerke, s/n: 1680-1699/16, from February 1917 renamed Roland D.I (Pfal).
LFG WD
Two float seaplane version first flown 29 June 1917 and tested at Warnemünde in July. It was found wanting both in its flight characteristics and the view forward and downwards. The latter criticism was frequently made of the D.I and its descendants, visibility blocked by engine radiators and the lower wing.modifications were made, but further official testing in September lead to the refusal of a production order. Modified yet again, the single example ended with the seaplane single-seat fighter school. It is sometimes referred to as the LFG W, though this name is also used for a LFG floatplane version of the Albatros C.Ia.

== Operators ==
Bulgaria

- Bulgarian Air Force

German Empire

- Luftstreitkräfte

== Specifications ==
Data from Die deutschen Militärflugzeuge 1919-1934

General characteristics

- Crew: 1
- Height: 2.9 m (9 ft 6 in)
- Wing area: 23 m^{2} (250 sq ft)
- Empty weight: 699 kg (1,541 lb)
- Gross weight: 932 kg (2,055 lb)
- Fuel capacity: 129 kg (284 lb)
- Powerplant: 1 × Mercedes D.III 6-cylinder water-cooled in-line piston engine, 120 kW (160 hp)
- Propellers: 2-bladed fixed-pitch propeller

Performance

- Maximum speed: 165 km/h (103 mph, 89 kn)
- Service ceiling: 5,000 m (16,000 ft)
- Rate of climb: 2.8 m/s (550 ft/min)
- Time to altitude: 4,000 m (13,000 ft) in 14 minutes

Armament

- Guns: 1 × fixed, forward-firing 7.92 mm LMG 08/15 machine gun

== Bibliography ==
- Gray, Peter & Thetford, Owen (1987) [1970]. German Aircraft of the First World War (2nd ed.). Putnam. ISBN 0-85177-809-7.
- Green, William & Swanborough, Gordon (2001) [1994]. The Complete Book of Fighters: An Illustrated Encyclopedia of Every Fighter Built and Flown (Revised and updated ed.). Salamander Books. ISBN 1-84065-269-1.
- Herris, Jack (2014). Roland Aircraft of WWI: A Centennial Perspective on Great War Airplanes. Great War Aviation Centennial Series. Vol. 9. Aeronaut Books. ISBN 978-1-935881-20-9.
