= LFG V 40 =

1920s German sports aircraft

V 40
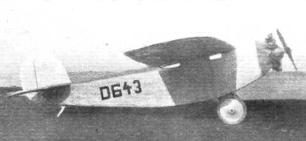

General information
- Type: Two-seat sports aircraft
- National origin: Germany
- Manufacturer: LFG (Luft-Fahrzeug-Gesellschaft)
- Number built: 2 (V 40, V 44)

History
- First flight: 1925

The LFG V 40 and V 44 were one-off, single-engine, two-seat sports monoplanes, identical apart from their engines, built in Germany in 1925.

== Design and development ==
The V 40 and V 44 were all-metal high-wing monoplanes, with thick, straight-edged, cantilever wings. Highly stressed members were steel, with duralumin elsewhere including the skin. The fuselages were deep-bellied and flat-sided with tandem open cockpits over the wing. On both aircraft, the pilot sat near the quarter chord position, with a slot in the fuselage below the wing to enhance his downward view, and the passenger was placed within a cut-out in the trailing edge. The tailplane was on top of the fuselage and the rounded vertical tail included a balanced rudder which extended down to the keel. The conventional undercarriage was fixed, with mainwheels on a single axle mounted on short V-struts and assisted by a tailskid.

The V 40 and V 44 airframes were identical, but the V 40 was powered by a 75 hp (56 kW) Siemens-Halske Sh 11 7-cylinder radial and the V 44 by a 100 hp (75 kW) Bristol Lucifer 3-cylinder radial. Both were nose-mounted, uncowled, and drove two-blade propellers. External dimensions, apart from the exact length, were the same, and the weights were also similar.

== Operational history ==
The V 40 and V 44 were amongst five LFG entries to the Round Germany Flight held in the summer of 1925, though only the LFG V 39 took take part.

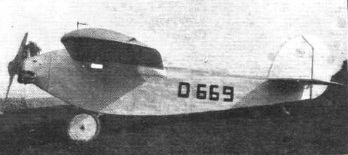
V 44

== Variants ==
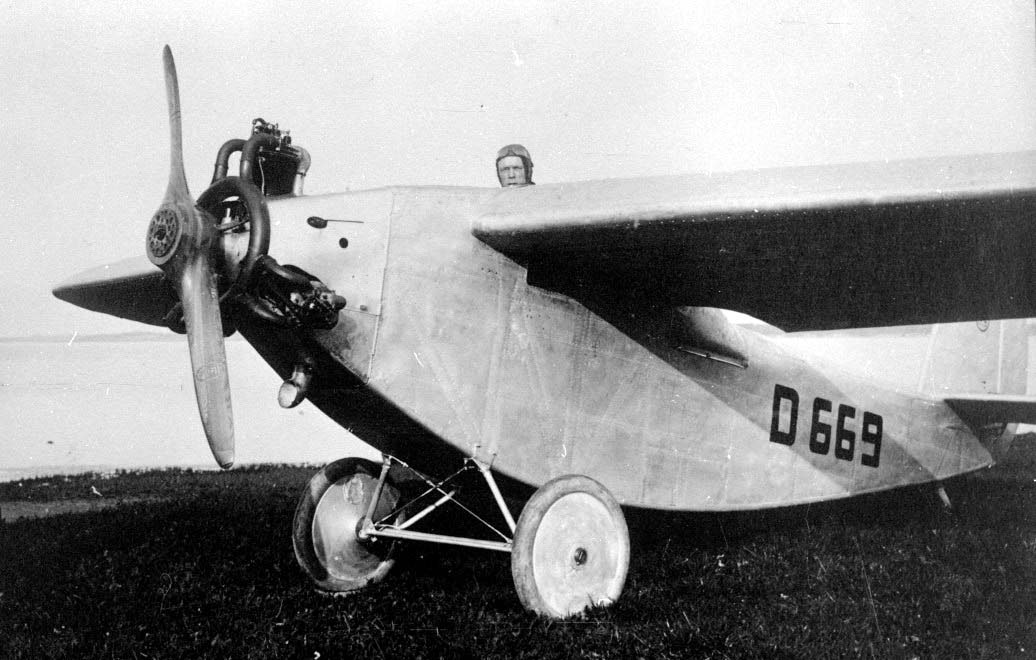
V 44

V 40
75 hp (56 kW) Siemens-Halske Sh 11 7-cylinder radial engine. One built.
V 44
100 hp (75 kW) Bristol Lucifer 3-cylinder radial engine. One built.

== Specifications ==
Data from Flight 28 May 1925 p.323-4

General characteristics

- Crew: One
- Capacity: One passenger
- Wingspan: 11.4 m (37 ft 5 in)
- Wing area: 18 m^{2} (190 sq ft)
- Gross weight: 829 kg (1,828 lb)
- Powerplant: 1 × Siemens-Halske Sh 11 7-cylinder radial, 56 kW (75 hp)
- Propellers: 2-bladed

Performance

- Maximum speed: 150 km/h (93 mph, 81 kn)
- Landing speed: 75 km/h (46 mph)
