= LFG V 20 =

1920s German seaplane airliner

V 20 Arkona

General information
- Type: Floatplane airliner
- National origin: Germany
- Manufacturer: LFG

The LFG V 20 Arkona (named for Kap Arkona on Rügen) was a seaplane airliner produced in small quantities in Germany in the early 1920s. It was a conventional, strut-braced, low-wing monoplane with an enclosed cabin for four passengers. The undercarriage consisted of twin pontoons. Originally produced in wood, a metal version of the aircraft was also developed

The V 20s were operated by Luft-Fahrzeug on its Hamburg-Stettin-Danzig and Stettin-Swinemünde-Stralsund routes.

== Specifications ==
Data from

General characteristics

- Crew: 1
- Capacity: 4 passengers
- Length: 9.2 m (30 ft 2 in)
- Wingspan: 14.4 m (47 ft 3 in)
- Height: 3.3 m (10 ft 10 in)
- Wing area: 40 m^{2} (430 sq ft)
- Empty weight: 1,040 kg (2,293 lb)
- Gross weight: 1,620 kg (3,571 lb)
- Powerplant: 1 × Benz Bz.IIIa 6-cylinder water-cooled in-line piston engine, 134 kW (180 hp)
- Propellers: 2-bladed fixed-pitchpropeller

Performance

- Maximum speed: 170 km/h (110 mph, 92 kn)
- Stall speed: 140 km/h (87 mph, 76 kn)
- Range: 575 km (357 mi, 310 nmi)
- Service ceiling: 4,500 m (14,800 ft)
- Rate of climb: 2 m/s (390 ft/min)
