= Luft-Fahrzeug-Gesellschaft =

1908–1933 German aircraft manufacturer

- Industry: Aircraft manufacture
- Founded: 1908
- Defunct: 1933
- Headquarters: Bitterfeld, Germany

Luft-Fahrzeug-Gesellschaft, also referred to as LFG, was a German aircraft manufacturer during World War I. They are best known for their various "Roland" designs, notably the Roland C.II Walfisch (whale), Roland D.II haifisch (Shark) and Roland D.VI, although they also produced a number of airships and many experimental designs.

== Airships ==
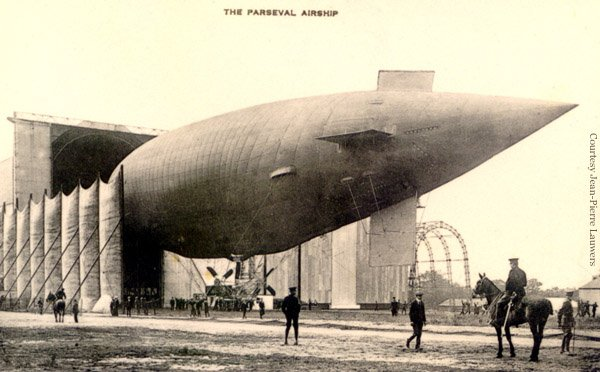
The PL 18 next to an airship hangar. This was delivered to the Royal Navy as Parseval No.4 in 1913.

Luft-Fahrzeug-Gesellschaft formed on April 30, 1908, from the assets of an experimental airship engine company located in Bitterfeld, Motorluftschiff Studiengesellscaft (MStG). Additional funding for the new enterprise was provided primarily by Krupp, AEG, and a local chemical company. The company's offices were located in Berlin along with the factory at Adlershof. Manufacture was transferred to Charlottenburg following a fire on 6 September 1916, allegedly caused by the British Secret Service.

Their first project was an airship design by August von Parseval, a German airship designer. This entered service as the PL.II in 1910. During World War I, four were delivered to the German Army and Navy. In total some 25 "PL" airships were built, flown and delivered to various customers. The PL-26, one of the last, crashed on landing and burnt inside hangar Luftschiffhalle 2 with no fatalities. For the rest of the war the hangars were used mostly for repairs of observation balloons.

== Aeroplanes ==
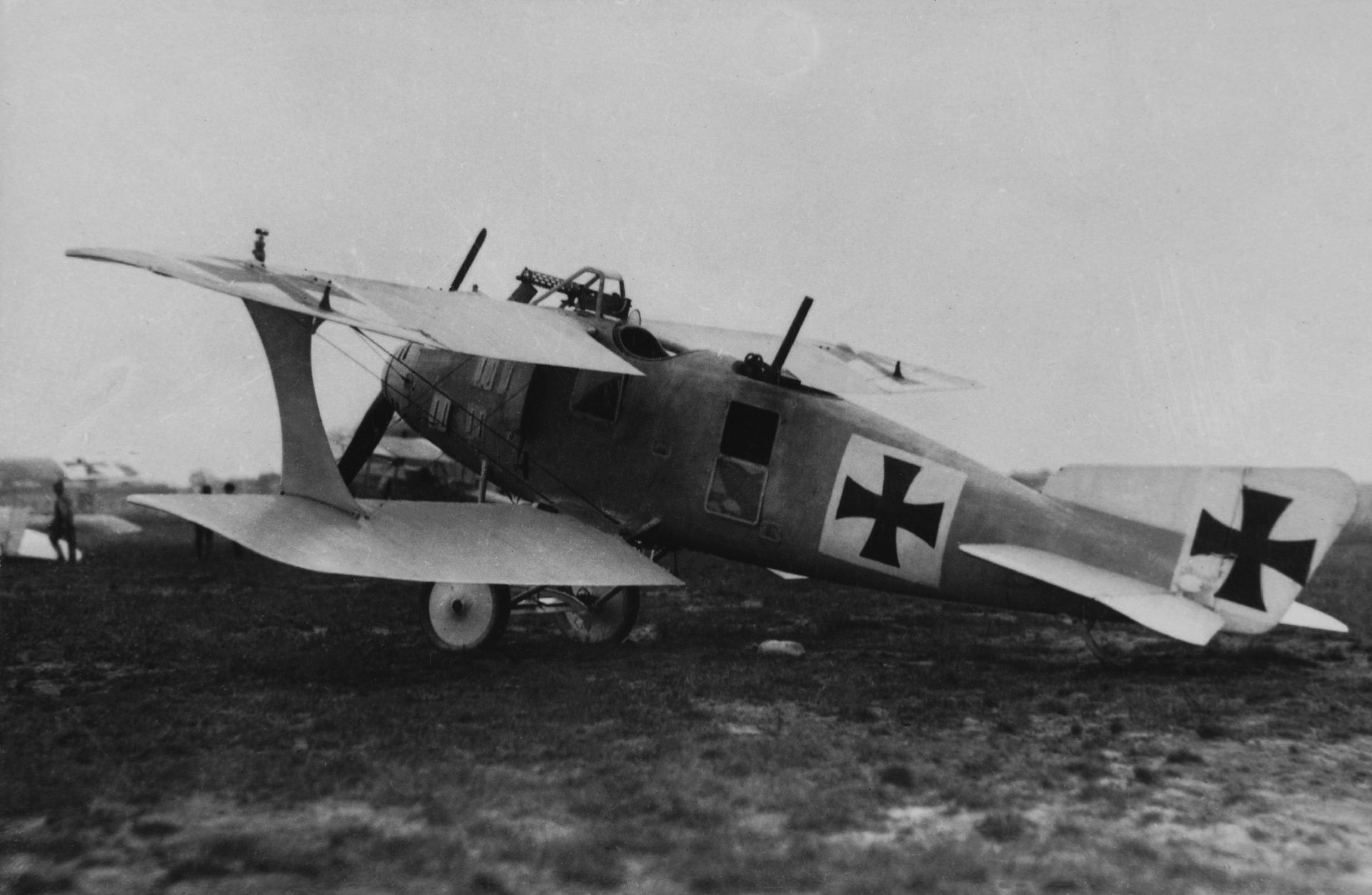
LFG Roland C.II Walfisch

In 1913 LFG started producing new designs under the trade name Roland to avoid confusion with the Luftverkehrsgesellschaft (L.V.G.) firm. In 1916 the company developed a floatplane version of the Albatros C.Ia as the LFG W. Some parts were built in Bitterfeld, but final assembly and checkout was carried out in new factories in Stralsund.

Their first successful design was the Roland C.II Walfisch (whale), a two-seat reconnaissance biplane. It had a semi-monocoque fuselage, skinned with two layers of long plywood strips glued at opposing diagonal angles around a mold and skinned with fabric both inside and outside. The fuselage filled the full gap between the wings, leaving the pilot and observer/gunner over the top wings with an excellent view upward. The fuselage "half-shells" were each fitted onto a supporting framework of wooden formers and longerons. The "wrapping" technique of the long plywood strips for the outer fuselage surface led to this particular technique of manufacture being described in German as the Wickelrumpf (wrapped body) style of construction, and was subsequently patented by the firm, licensing the construction method to Pfalz in 1917 for construction of their own single-seat fighter designs. Although it was said to have tricky handling, the Roland C.II had excellent performance, and was also used on long-range missions as a bomber escort. A version with the 200 hp Benz Bz.IV engine and new wing struts was built as the D.III, but only one prototype was ever built, as was the case for the 160 hp Mercedes D.III-powered C.V.

The C.II was adapted to the pure fighter role as the Roland D.I, but in this role the poor forward view proved to be a problem. A fire at the factory severely constrained production, and only 20 were built. A newer version with a more conventional layout, the Roland D.II, followed, whose fuselage was reduced in height to leave a gap with the upper wing but was otherwise similar overall. The competing Albatros D.I was preferred, and only about 230 examples were built, which were then mostly used on the eastern front and in Macedonia. The fuselage to wing gap was further increased in the D.III, but the temperamental 180 hp Argus As.III limited production to only a handful. Six D.IIs were delivered in July 1917 to the Bulgarian Air Force, and six D.IIIs were delivered in May 1918.

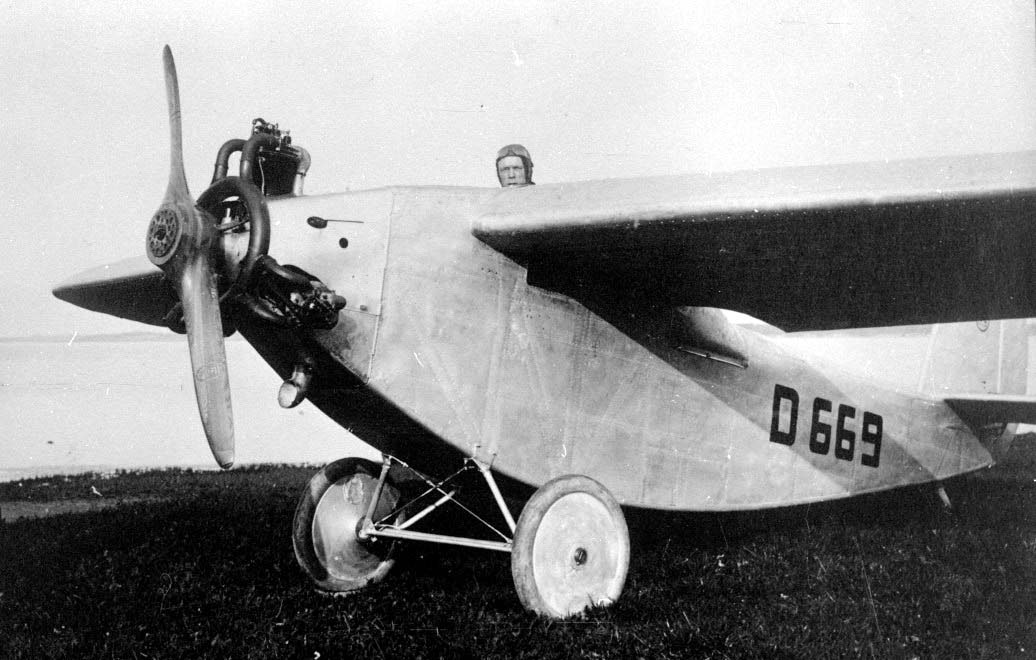
An LFG V 44

Although the Wickelrumpf style of wood-structure monocoque fuselage was extremely strong, it was also very difficult and time-consuming to build. A new method of construction was introduced that used spruce planking running the length of the aircraft in place of the formed plywood, and the D.III was adapted using this technique to produce D.IV triplane and D.V biplane, both powered by the D.III's 160 hp Mercedes. The fuselage shell's construction technique for these aircraft resembled a clinker-planked boat hull in appearance when finished, and was named Klinkerrumpf (clinker body) construction, and was also patented by the firm. A further adaptation of the D.IV with the 185 hp Benz Bz. III resulted in the Roland D.VI, which was entered in the First Fighter Competition trials at Adlershof in early 1918. Although the Fokker D.VII won that contest, the D.VI was also ordered into production as it used a different engine, and by the end of the war about 350 had been delivered. A large number of different versions using various engines were built as prototypes without entering production, as well as a triplane adaptation as the D.VI (also known as the Dr.I).

The next major design from Roland were parasol monoplane designs, the D.XVI with the Siemens-Halske Sh.III or 170 hp Goebel Goe.IIIa rotary piston engines, and the otherwise similar D.XVII with the inline 185 hp BMW IIIa. Both were entered into the Second Fighter Competition at Adlershof, but lost to the Fokker D.VIII.

After the war all aircraft production in Germany was banned, and the company was forced to close the Bitterfeld plant and reopen in Seddin, producing airplanes, balloons and life boats. In 1933, aircraft production shut down. Three additional Parseval pattern airships were also built during this period.

=== Aeroplane types ===
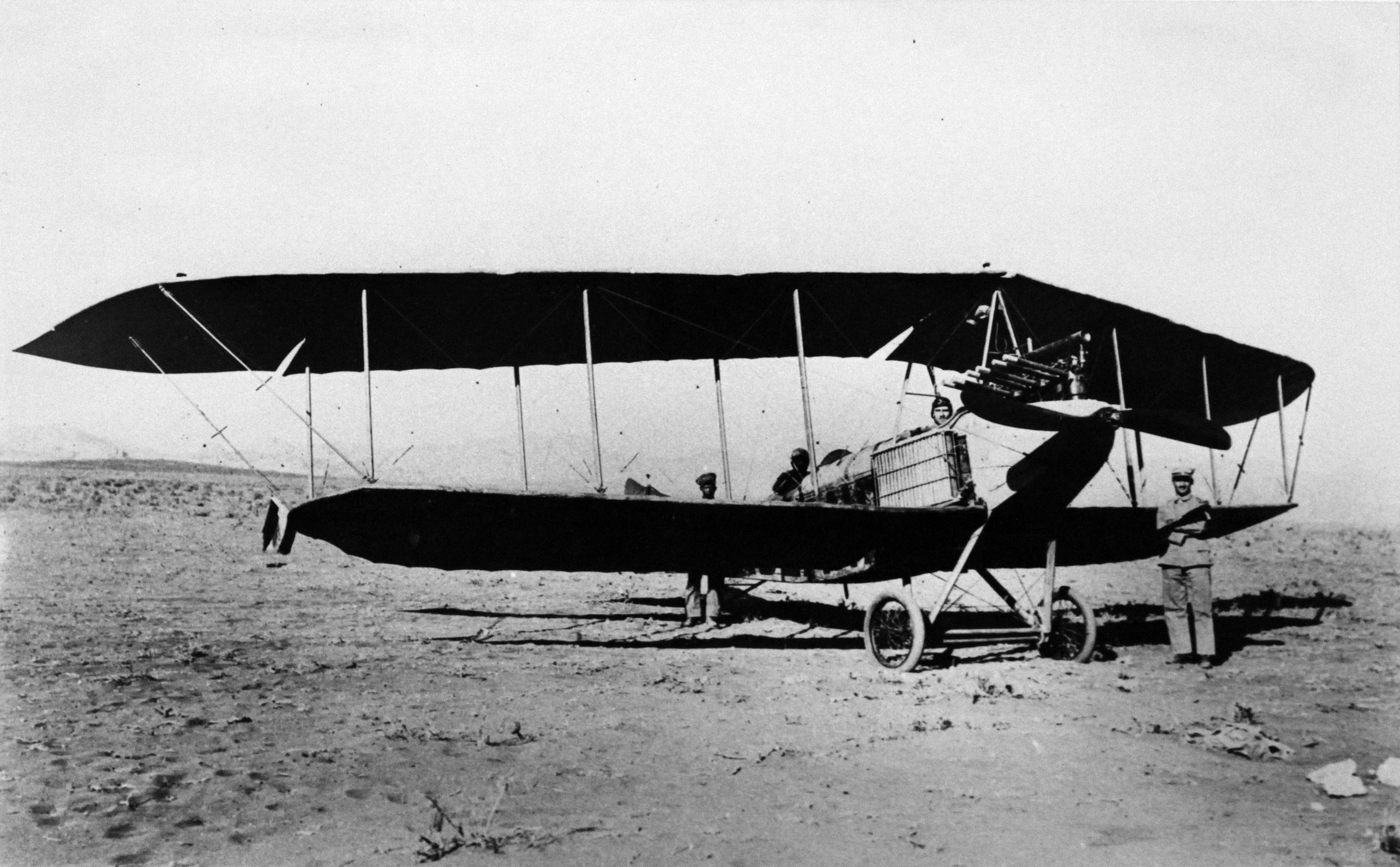
An LFG Roland Pfeilflieger observation biplane

This is a list of aeroplane produced, taken from Nowarra, Heinz: Flugzeuge 1914–1918, München 1959 and Emmanuel Gustin's list of German military aircraft.

- C.II und C.IIa "Walfisch" biplane reconnaissance, two-seater
- C.III variant of C.II, one built – destroyed by fire when LFG plant burned, 6 September 1916
- LFG Roland C.V- two-seat version of D.II, prototype only
- C.VIII – prototype only
- C.X – reconnaissance
- D.I "Haifisch" – biplane fighter with top wing mounted on fuselage
- D.II – fighter, about 230 built
- D.III – fighter, few built
- D.IV – triplane, prototype only (also known as Dr. I)
- D.V – D.III variant, only three prototypes
- D.VI – fighter, 350 built, similar to D.III, ordered as backup for D.VII
- D.VII – one prototype built
- D.VIII – one prototype built
- D.IX – three prototypes built
- D.X – projected only
- D.XI – projected only
- D.XII – projected only
- D.XIII – development abandoned when destroyed in a fire
- D.XIV – fighter, variant of D.XIII, very unreliable
- D.XV – fighter, three of a first design built, two of a second design also named D.XV
- D.XVI – fighter, prototypes only
- D.XVII – parasol-wing monoplane fighter, one built
- G.I – single engine biplane bomber, only one built
- LFG Roland ME 8 – Seaplane fighter, only projected
- LFG Roland MD 14 – reconnaissance, only projected
- LFG Roland MD 15 – reconnaissance, only projected
- V 3 Susanna – pusher flying boat
- V 8 Bärbel – pusher flying boat
- V 13 and V 130 Strela – airliner, latter mounted on floats
- V 14 - design only
- V 15 - design only
- V 16 - design only
- V 17 - design only
- V 18 Sassnitz - pusher flying boat airliner
- V 19 – single-seat submarine reconnaissance floatplane, prototype completed in 1918
- V 20 – floatplane airliner
- V 23 - design only
- V 25 - design only
- V 26 - design only
- V 27 - design only
- V 28 - design only
- V 36 - design only
- V 39
- V 40
- V 42
- V 44 – one prototype built
- V 52
- V 59
- V 60
- V 61
- V 101 – floatplane airliner
- LFG Roland W – Floatplane version of Albatros C.Ia
- LFG Roland WD – Floatplane version of LFG Roland D.I rejected due to poor visibility
- LFG Roland W 1 – Seaplane, single seater fighter
- LFG Roland W 16 – Seaplane

== See also ==
- List of aircraft manufacturers
