= LFG Roland C.II =

German reconnaissance aircraft from World War I

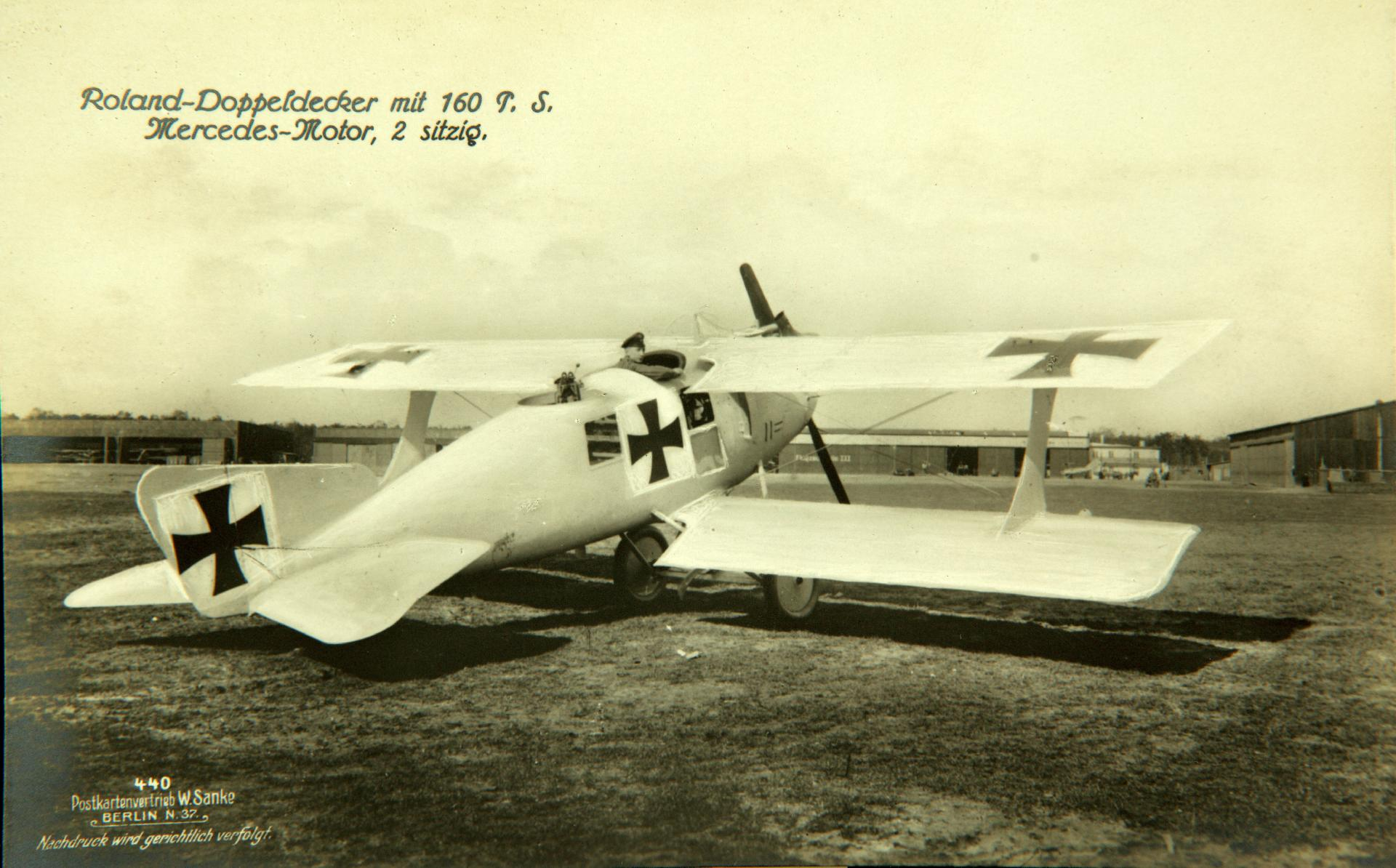

General information
- Type: Reconnaissance Aircraft
- Manufacturer: Luft-Fahrzeug-Gesellschaft G.m.b.H.
- Designer: Dipl. Ing. Tantzen
- Primary user: Luftstreitkräfte
- Number built: 400

History
- Introduction date: 1916
- First flight: 1915

The LFG Roland C.II, usually known as the Walfisch (Whale), was an advanced German reconnaissance aircraft of World War I. It was manufactured by Luft-Fahrzeug-Gesellschaft G.m.b.H.

== Characteristics ==
The C.II had much lower drag than comparable aircraft of its time. It featured a monocoque fuselage built with an outer skin of two layers of thin plywood strips at an angle to each other (known as a Wickelrumpf, or "wrapped body" design). This had both lower drag and better strength per weight than typical of the time, but it was relatively slow and expensive to build. (This approach was further developed in the de Havilland Mosquito of World War II.) The deep fuselage completely filled the vertical gap between the wing panel center sections, eliminating any need for cabane struts commonly used in biplanes, and gave the aircraft its "whale" nickname. Struts and wires were reduced, without suffering the weight penalty of cantilever wings, like those used on the pioneering all-metal Junkers J 1 of late 1915. There was even some attempt to fair the wings into the fuselage, to eliminate dead air space, a feature prominently missing from the Schneider Trophy contestants of the following decade. The engineer in charge of the design was Tantzen, who was a student of Ludwig Prandtl, the founder of mathematical aerodynamics and the one to introduce the concept of boundary layer.

The C.II was powered by a single 160 hp (120 kW) Mercedes D III, providing a top speed of 165 km/h (103 mph), a ceiling of 4,000 metres (13,000 ft) and a flight endurance of four hours.

== Operational history ==
The C.II entered service in the spring of 1916. Operationally, handling was reported as difficult but performance was relatively good. Due to the crew positions with eyes above the upper wing, upward visibility was excellent, but downward visibility was poor. It was also used in a fighter escort role and had a crew of two, pilot and observer/gunner.

Because of its speed, when it was first introduced, few enemy aircraft could catch it level flight. A notable exception was the Nieuport 17 C.1, which was introduced at almost the same time, and which was several miles per hour faster. Because of the lack of downward visibility, it was best attacked by diving below and coming up at it.

Albert Ball, whose first victim was a C.II, said in the latter half of 1916 that it was "the best German machine now".

== Variants ==
- C.II : Two-seat reconnaissance, escort fighter biplane.
- C.IIa : Generally similar to the Roland C.II, but fitted with revised and reinforced wingtips and larger vertical stabilizer.
- C.III : Development with two bay wings and a 200 hp (149 kW) Benz Bz.IV 6-cylinder water-cooled inline engine.

== Operators ==
German Empire

- Luftstreitkräfte

== Specifications (C.II) ==
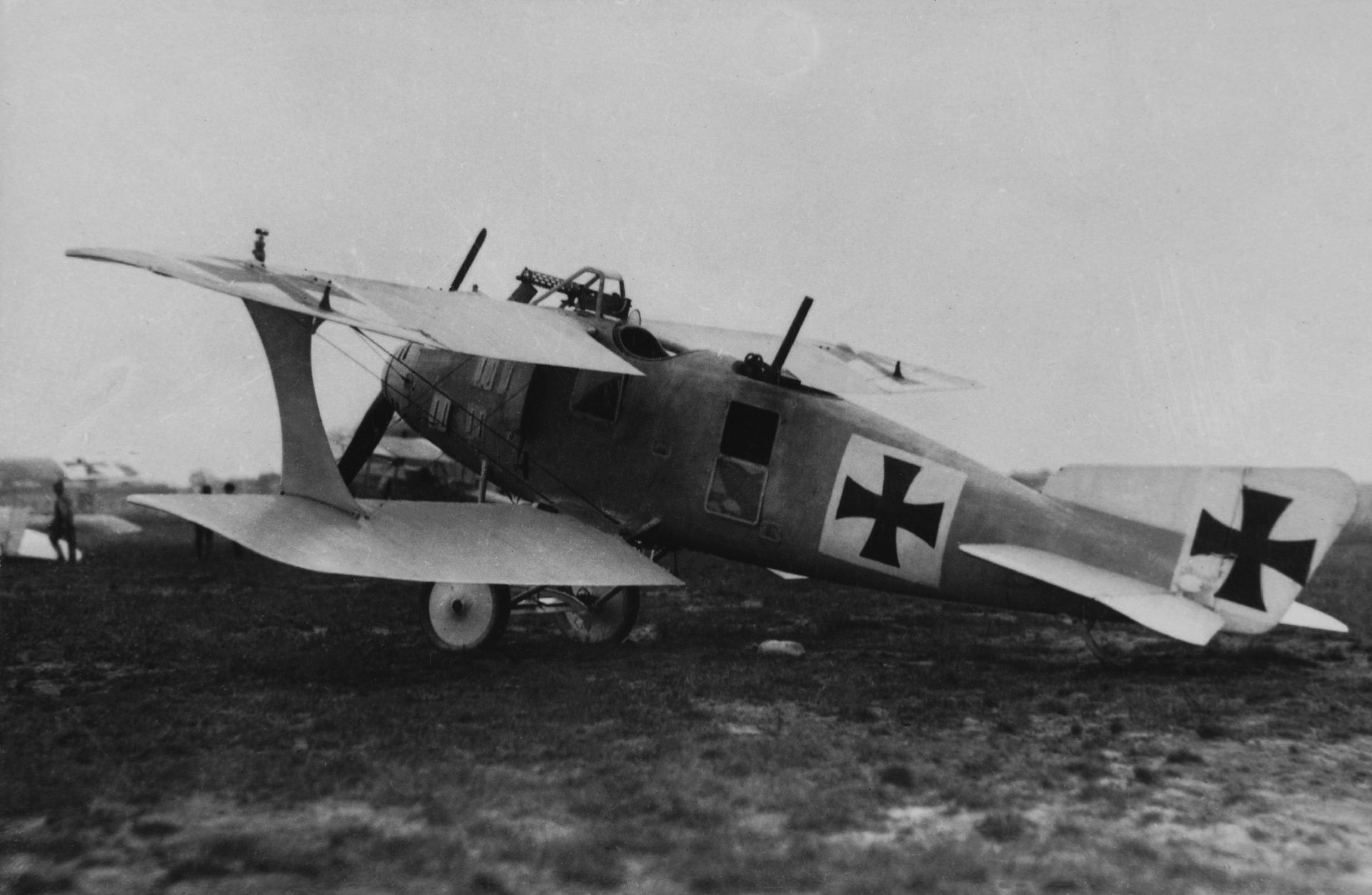
LFG Roland C.II

Data from German Aircraft of the First World War

General characteristics

- Crew: 2
- Length: 7.7 m (25 ft 3 in)
- Wingspan: 10.3 m (33 ft 10 in)
- Height: 2.9 m (9 ft 6 in)
- Wing area: 26 m^{2} (280 sq ft)
- Empty weight: 764 kg (1,684 lb)
- Gross weight: 1,284 kg (2,831 lb)
- Powerplant: 1 × Mercedes D.III 6-cylinder water-cooled in-line piston engine, 120 kW (160 hp)
- Propellers: 2-bladed fixed-pitch wooden propeller

Performance

- Maximum speed: 165 km/h (103 mph, 89 kn)
- Endurance: 4-5 hours dependent on fuel load
- Service ceiling: 4,000 m (13,000 ft)
- Time to altitude: 2,000 m (6,600 ft) in 12 minutes

Armament

- Guns:

- 1x 7.92 mm (0.312 in) Parabellum MG14 machine gun on a ring mounting in rear cockpit,
- 1x forward-firing synchronized 7.92 mm (0.312 in) Maschinengewehr 08 "Spandau" machine gun

- Bombs:

- 4x 12.5 kg (28 lb) bombs carried under the fuselage.

== Comparable aircraft ==
- Hannover CL.II

== Bibliography ==
- Herris, Jack (2014). Roland Aircraft of WWI: A Centennial Perspective on Great War Airplanes. Great War Aviation Centennial Series. Vol. 9. Aeronaut Books. ISBN 978-1-935881-20-9.
