= LFG V 39 =

1920s German trainer aircraft

V 39
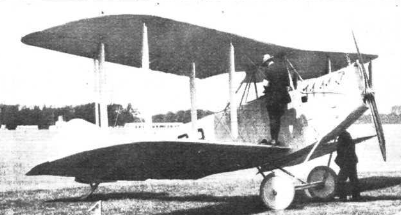

General information
- Type: Training aircraft
- National origin: Germany
- Manufacturer: LFG (Luft-Fahrzeug-Gesellschaft)

History
- First flight: 1925 or earlier

The LFG V 39 was a simple biplane trainer built in Germany in the mid-1920s. It took part in the Round Germany Flight in the summer of 1925.

== Design and development ==
The V 39 was a two bay biplane with constant chord wings mounted with slight stagger and a wide gap. The fabric covered wings had box spars and three-ply ribs. There were ailerons on both upper and lower wing, externally rod-connected. The upper wing was centrally supported with cabane struts.

The trainer was designed to be powered by a 75 kW (100 hp) Mercedes D.I or 89 kW (120 hp) D.II engine. It is known that the smaller engine at least was flown. The fuselage was deep bellied, flat sided, constructed from wood and covered with three-ply. There were two open, tandem cockpits, the rear one provided with vision enhancing trailing edge cut-outs in both upper and lower planes. The V 39's undercarriage was standard for the time, with mainwheels on a rigid axle supported by fuselage mounted V-struts and with a tailskid.

The V 39 was designed to combine modest performance with reliability and robustness with easy handling and a low landing speed.

== Operational history ==
The V 39 was one of more than ninety aircraft to take part in the Round Germany Flight held in the summer of 1925.

== Specifications ==
Data from Flight 28 May 1925 p.323

General characteristics

- Length: 7.85 m (25 ft 9 in)
- Wingspan: 12 m (39 ft 4 in)
- Wing area: 40 m^{2} (430 sq ft)
- Empty weight: 803 kg (1,770 lb)
- Gross weight: 1,130 kg (2,491 lb)
- Powerplant: 1 × Mercedes D.I 6-cylinder water cooled upright inline, 75 kW (100 hp)
- Propellers: 2-bladed

Performance

- Maximum speed: 125 km/h (78 mph, 67 kn)
- Service ceiling: 3,800 m (12,500 ft)
- Time to altitude: 8 min to 1,000 m (3,280 ft)
- Landing speed: 55 km/h (34 mph)
