= Aircraft of Czechoslovakia interwar period =

This is a list of aircraft of Czechoslovakia during the interwar period. This list aims to show aircraft of the Czechoslovak Air Force during the interwar period hence it does not include prototypes of Czechoslovak aircraft.

== Fighters ==
- Aero A.18
- Avia BH-3
- Letov Š-4
- Letov Š-20
- Avia BH-21
- Avia BH-33
- Letov Š-31
- Avia B-34
- Avia B-534

== Bombers ==
- Letov Š-6
- Aero A.11
- Aero A.12
- Letov Š-16
- Aero A.30
- Aero A.32
- Aero A.100
- Bloch MB.200
- Aero A.304

== Reconnaissance ==
- Letov Š-1
- Avia BH-26
- Letov Š-28

== Trainers ==
- Aero Ae 01
- Letov Š-18
