= Letov Š-14 =

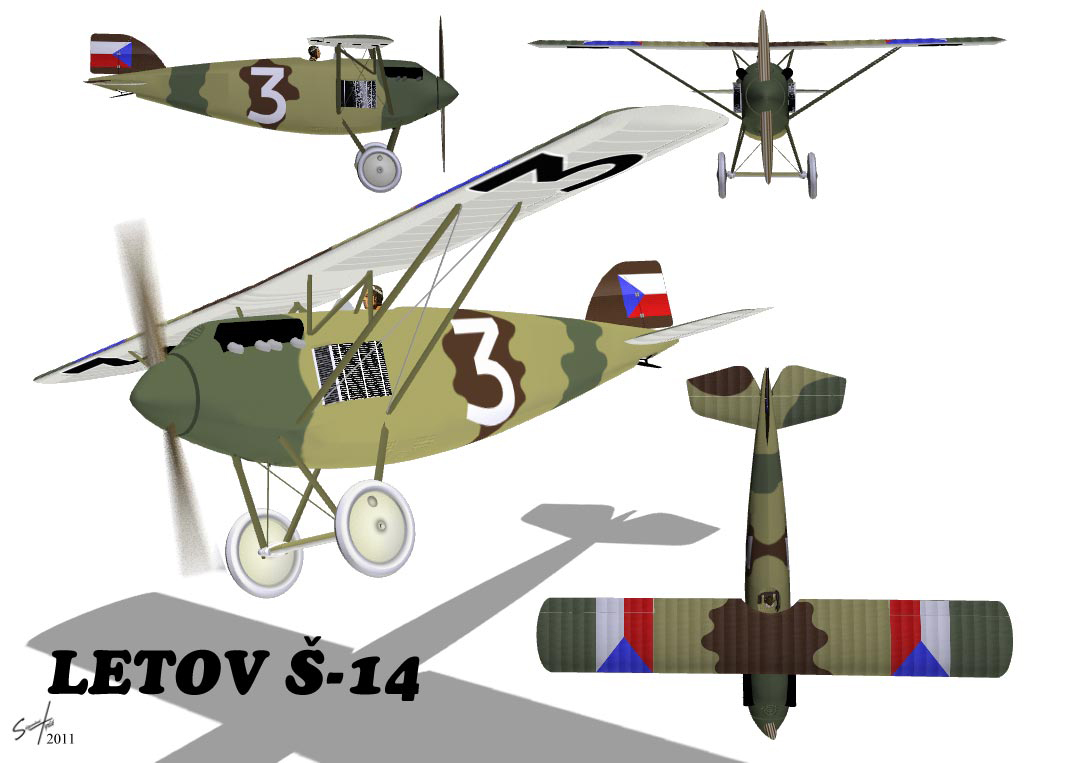

General information
- Type: Single-seat fighter
- National origin: Czechoslovakia
- Manufacturer: Letov Kbely
- Designer: Alois Šmolik
- Number built: 1

History
- First flight: 1924

The Letov Š-14 was a single-seat, single-engine aircraft, designed and built in Czechoslovakia in the early 1920s. Originally intended as a biplane fighter, it was later modified into a monoplane and entered as a contestant in a speed competition.

== Design and development ==
The Letov Š-14 was designed alongside the Letov Š-13, sharing its Škoda licence-built 300 hp (224 kW) Hispano-Suiza 8Fb water-cooled V-8 engine but not its thick airfoil wings. Like the Š-13, it was intended as a single-seat biplane fighter aircraft. It was of mixed construction, with wooden wings and a metal-framed fuselage.

The wings, mounted without stagger, were straight edged with a constant chord and blunt wingtips. It was a single bay biplane with a pair of interplane struts on each side. These were straight and near parallel, but converged a little towards the narrower chord lower wing. The upper wing was braced to the fuselage with a cabane immediately ahead of the open cockpit, situated below the wing trailing edge.

The Hispano drove a two-blade propeller with a pointed spinner; it was cooled by a rectangular radiator on each side of the fuselage between the wings. The fuselage was flat sided with rounded decking, tapering aft to the mid-mounted tailplane, where the vertical tail was broad and low. The Š-14 landed on a fixed conventional tailskid undercarriage.

The Š-14 first flew in 1924 but Letov quickly decided to concentrate their fighter development efforts on the Letov Š-20 which flew the following year. Instead, the Š-14 was rebuilt as a cantilever monoplane to take part in the Third Speed Contest of 1924. At that event it recorded a speed of 153.13 mph (246.44 km/h).

== Specifications (biplane) ==
Data from Green and Swanborough pp.333-4

General characteristics

- Crew: one
- Length: 6.43 m (21 ft 1 in)
- Wingspan: 8.10 m (26 ft 7 in)
- Empty weight: 664 kg (1,464 lb)
- Gross weight: 896 kg (1,975 lb)
- Powerplant: 1 × Hispano-Suiza 8Fb V8 water-cooled, 220 kW (300 hp)
- Propellers: 2-bladed

Performance

- Maximum speed: 238 km/h (148 mph, 129 kn)
- Range: 495 km (308 mi, 267 nmi)
- Time to altitude: 18.5 min to 5,000 m (16,405 ft)
