= Letov Š-3 =

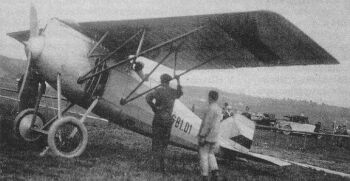
- Letov Š-3

General information
- Type: Single-seat fighter
- National origin: Czechoslovakia
- Manufacturer: Letov Kbely
- Designer: Alois Šmolik
- Number built: 2 (the first destroyed before flying)

History
- First flight: Early 1922

The Letov Š-3 was a single-seat, single-engine parasol wing fighter aircraft designed and built in Czechoslovakia in the early 1920s. Only one was completed and flown, its makers preferring to develop a biplane fighter.

== Design and development ==
The Letov Š-3, originally known as the Letov Š.B1, was the first original fighter design from Letov, the start of a line designed by Alois Šmolik. It had a wooden parasol wing and a metal-framed fuselage and empennage, and was powered by a 185 hp (138 kW) six-cylinder water-cooled in-line BMW IIIa engine.

The wing was only slightly tapered, being almost rectangular and with a cutout in the trailing edge over the cockpit to improve the pilot's field of view. Short-span ailerons were mounted far outboard. On each side there were two pairs of parallel struts bracing the wing to the fuselage; both pairs were mounted on the lower fuselage but one pair met the wing at about 60% span, the other at 30%. Each outer strut had a jury strut at right angles which met the top of its inboard equivalent at the wing.

The Š-3's upright inline engine was completely enclosed within a cowling, with its top just below the pilot's eye line. It drove a two-blade propeller with a domed spinner. The BMW was cooled with Lamblin cylindrical radiators placed between the undercarriage legs, though a diagram shows it with narrow, fuselage-hugging (cheek) radiators. The oval cross-section fuselage tapered rearwards behind the cockpit to a straight tapered tailplane and divided elevators with a cutout for rudder movement; the latter was mounted on a circular-edged fin and had its bottom cropped for elevator clearance. The Š-3 had a fixed, single-axle conventional undercarriage, with mainwheels on cross-braced V-struts.

The first prototype was destroyed late in 1921 by a factory fire before its first flight, but the second flew early the next year. It took part in the International Meeting at Zurich in 1922 with modest success but the Military Aircraft Works decided to concentrate its efforts on the biplane Letov Š-4, and development of the Š-3 ended.

== Specifications ==
Data from Green and Swanborough p.333

General characteristics

- Crew: one
- Length: 7.08 m (23 ft 3 in)
- Wingspan: 10.13 m (33 ft 3 in)
- Height: 3.04 m (10 ft 0 in)
- Wing area: 17.60 m^{2} (189.4 sq ft)
- Empty weight: 622 kg (1,371 lb)
- Gross weight: 928 kg (2,046 lb)
- Powerplant: 1 × BMW IIIa 6-cylinder water-cooled in-line, 150 kW (200 hp)
- Propellers: 2-bladed

Performance

- Maximum speed: 225 km/h (140 mph, 121 kn)
- Range: 472 km (293 mi, 255 nmi)
- Time to altitude: 5.9 min to 3,000 m (9,840 ft)

Armament

- Guns: 2 × 7.7 mm (0.303 in) Vickers machine guns
