= S33 =

S33 may refer to:

== Aviation ==
- Blériot-SPAD S.33, a French airliner
- Letov Š-33, a Czechoslovak bomber
- Madras Municipal Airport, in Jefferson County, Oregon, United States
- Short S.33, a variant of the Short S.27 British biplane of the 1910s
- Short S.33, a variant of the Short Empire British flying boat of the 1930s
- Sikorsky S-33 Messenger, an American sesquiplane
- Spectrum S-33 Independence, an American business jet

== Naval vessels ==
- Brazilian submarine Tapajó (S-33)
- SMS S33 (1914), a torpedo boat of the Imperial German Navy
- Spanish submarine Narcíso Monturiol (S33)
- USS S-33 (SS-138), a submarine of the United States Navy

== Other uses ==
- S33 (Long Island bus)
- S33 (ZVV), a line of the Zürich S-Bahn
- County Route S33 (Bergen County, New Jersey)
- S33: Take precautionary measures against static discharges, a safety phrase
- Section 33 of the Canadian Charter of Rights and Freedoms
- Sotho language
- Sulfur-33, an isotope of sulfur
- S33, a postcode district in the Hope Valley, Derbyshire, England
