= Letov Š-13 =

General information
- Type: Single-seat fighter
- National origin: Czechoslovakia
- Manufacturer: Letov Kbely
- Designer: Alois Šmolik
- Number built: 1

History
- First flight: 1924

The Letov Š-13 was a single-seat, single-engine fighter aircraft designed and built in Czechoslovakia in the early 1920s. A biplane, it had aerodynamically thick wings which were originally cantilever structures, though interplane struts were later added. Only one was produced.

== Design and development ==
The Letov Š-13 was designed as a cantilever biplane, its Zhukovsky airfoil wings thick enough in section to allow internal bracing. In other ways it much resembled the 1923 Letov Š-7. The wings, mounted with modest stagger, were straight edged with constant chord and blunt wingtips. The slightly broader chord upper wing was braced to the fuselage with a cabane, formed on each side by a forward parallel pair of struts from the mid-fuselage, and a rear inverted-V pair from the upper fuselage. Only the lower planes carried ailerons.

Both the Š-7 and the Š-13 were powered by a Škoda licence-built Hispano-Suiza 8Fb, a 300 hp (224 kW) water-cooled V-8 engine. Letov had experienced cooling problems with it in the Š-7 and so the ring-shaped radiator proposed originally for the Š-13 was dropped and replaced from the start with the transversely mounted, circular cross-section ventral radiator successfully tested on the modified Letov Š-7a. The Hispano drove a two-blade propeller with a domed spinner. Behind the engine, the fuselage had an oval cross-section, with the single open cockpit partially under the wing trailing edge which had a shallow cutout to enhance his view. The fuselage tapered rearwards to a point behind the tail control surfaces. The cropped, straight tapered horizontal tail was mounted on the fuselage centreline; the fin and rudder, larger than on the Š-7, were also straight edged. The Š-7 had a fixed, single-axle conventional undercarriage, with mainwheels on cross-braced V-struts, assisted by a tailskid.

The Letov Š-13 first flew in 1924 in cantilever configuration but during the early flight trials concern about wing strength led to its conversion into a single bay biplane by the addition of a pair of interplane struts. These were initially N-shaped but later changed to Vs. The trials demonstrated generally good handling characteristics but stability problems brought an end to development.

== Specifications ==
Data from Green and Swanborough p.333

General characteristics

- Crew: one
- Length: 6.97 m (22 ft 10 in)
- Wingspan: 8.00 m (26 ft 3 in)
- Height: 2.86 m (9 ft 5 in)
- Wing area: 20.00 m^{2} (215.3 sq ft)
- Airfoil: Zhukovsky
- Empty weight: 790 kg (1,742 lb)
- Gross weight: 1,166 kg (2,571 lb)
- Powerplant: 1 × Hispano-Suiza 8Fb V8 water-cooled, 220 kW (300 hp)
- Propellers: 2-bladed

Performance

- Maximum speed: 230 km/h (140 mph, 120 kn)
- Range: 550 km (340 mi, 300 nmi)
- Time to altitude: 18.15 min to 5,000 m (16,000 ft)
