= S25 =

S25 can refer to:

== Aircraft ==
- Blériot-SPAD S.25, a French biplane
- Letov Š-25, a Czechoslovak biplane trainer
- Short S.25 Sandringham, a British flying boat airliner
- Short S.25 Sunderland, a British flying boat bomber
- Sikorsky S-25, a Russian biplane bomber
- Spalinger S.25, a Swiss training glider

== Roads ==
- County Route S25 (California)
- County Route S25 (Bergen County, New Jersey)
- New Jersey Route 413, numbered S25 until 1953

== Rail and transit ==
- S25 (Berlin), a line on the Berlin S-Bahn, Germany
- S25 (Long Island bus), United States
- S25 (St. Gallen S-Bahn), an S-Bahn service operating over the Rorschach–Heiden railway line, Switzerland
- S25 (ZVV), a line of the Zurich S-Bahn, Switzerland
- S25, an Aargau S-Bahn line, Switzerland
- Niseko Station, in Hokkaido, Japan

== Other uses ==
- S-25 (rocket), a Soviet air-to-ground rocket
- 40S ribosomal protein S25, a eukaryote-specific protein
- British NVC community S25, a swamps and tall-herb fens community in the British National Vegetation Classification system
- INS Vagir (S25), a submarine of the Indian Navy
- S25: Avoid contact with eyes, a safety phrase
- S-25 Berkut, a Soviet surface-to-air missile system
- Siemens S25, a Siemens Mobile phone
- USS S-25 (SS-130), a submarine of the United States Navy
- S25, a postcode district in Sheffield, England
- Samsung Galaxy S25, a series of high-end Android smartphones developed by Samsung Electronics
