= L101 =

L101 may refer to:

- Albatros L.101, a 1930s German trainer aircraft
- L101 railway (Croatia), a railway line in Croatia between Čakovec and Mursko Središće
- Landsverk L-101, an ultra-light weight tank destroyer armed with a 20mm cannon
- Letov L-101, an airliner designed in Czechoslovakia shortly after the end of the Second World War
- ICAO code for the Lockheed L-1011 TriStar airliner
- Sonde language (L101), Bantu language of the Democratic Republic of the Congo
