= Letov Š-12 =

General information
- Type: Fighter
- Manufacturer: Letov Kbely
- Designer: Alois Šmolík
- Number built: 1

History
- First flight: 1924
- Developed from: Letov Š-4

The Letov Š-12 was a fighter aircraft built by Letov in the early 1920s.

== Design ==
The Š-12 was a monoplane based on the Letov Š-4. The aircraft remained a prototype only without entering mass production.

== Specifications (Š-12) ==
Data from

General characteristics

- Crew: 1
- Length: 6.58 m (21 ft 7 in)
- Wingspan: 9.4 m (30 ft 10 in)
- Wing area: 15.5 m^{2} (167 sq ft)
- Empty weight: 673 kg (1,484 lb)
- Max takeoff weight: 983 kg (2,167 lb)
- Powerplant: 1 × Hispano-Suiza 8Ba V-8 water-cooled piston engine, 160 kW (220 hp)

Performance

- Maximum speed: 180 km/h (110 mph, 97 kn)
- Cruise speed: 150 km/h (93 mph, 81 kn)
- Range: 470 km (290 mi, 250 nmi)
- Service ceiling: 6,000 m (20,000 ft)

Armament

- Guns: 2x 7.7 mm (0.303 in) machine guns
