= Letov Š-5 =

General information
- Type: Light scout
- Manufacturer: Letov Kbely
- Designer: Alois Šmolík
- Number built: 1

History
- First flight: 1923

The Letov Š-5 was a light scout aircraft built by Letov in the early 1920s.

== Design ==
The Š-5 was similar to the Letov Š-1 in armament and equipment. However, the weight was greater, and the fuselage was stronger and easier to repair. Only one aircraft was built, serving in an aviation school in Cheb until 1930.

== Specifications ==
Data from

General characteristics

- Crew: 2
- Length: 8.3 m (27 ft 3 in)
- Wingspan: 12.7 m (41 ft 8 in)
- Wing area: 35.9 m^{2} (386 sq ft)
- Empty weight: 995 kg (2,194 lb)
- Gross weight: 1,447 kg (3,190 lb)
- Powerplant: 1 × Hiero L 6-cylinder water-cooled inline piston engine, 170 kW (230 hp)

Performance

- Maximum speed: 195 km/h (121 mph, 105 kn)
- Cruise speed: 152 km/h (94 mph, 82 kn)
- Range: 615 km (382 mi, 332 nmi)
- Service ceiling: 5,000 m (16,000 ft)

Armament

- Guns:
- 1x 7.7 mm (0.303 in) Vickers machine gun
- 2x 7.7 mm (0.303 in) Lewis guns
