= Letov LK-2 Sluka =

LK-2 Sluka
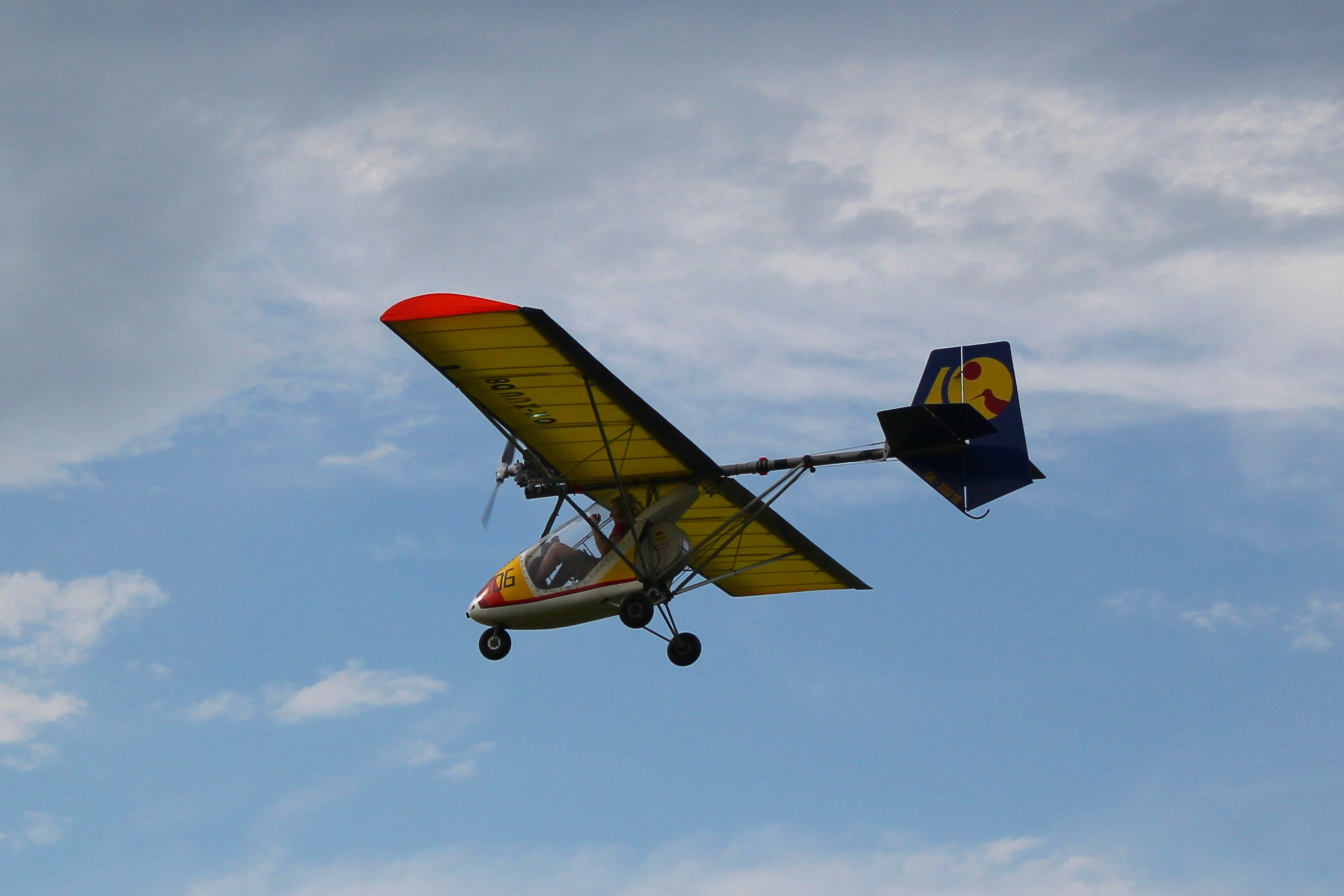
- Sluka in flight

General information
- Type: Single-seat ultralight
- National origin: Czechoslovakia, Czech Republic
- Manufacturer: Letov, Prague, Airhero
- Designer: J.Kamyrýt, J.Šimůnek
- Status: In production as a 51% built kit
- Primary user: Fly4fun

History
- Manufactured: 1991-1996, LK2H since 2015
- Introduction date: 1991
- First flight: 1988

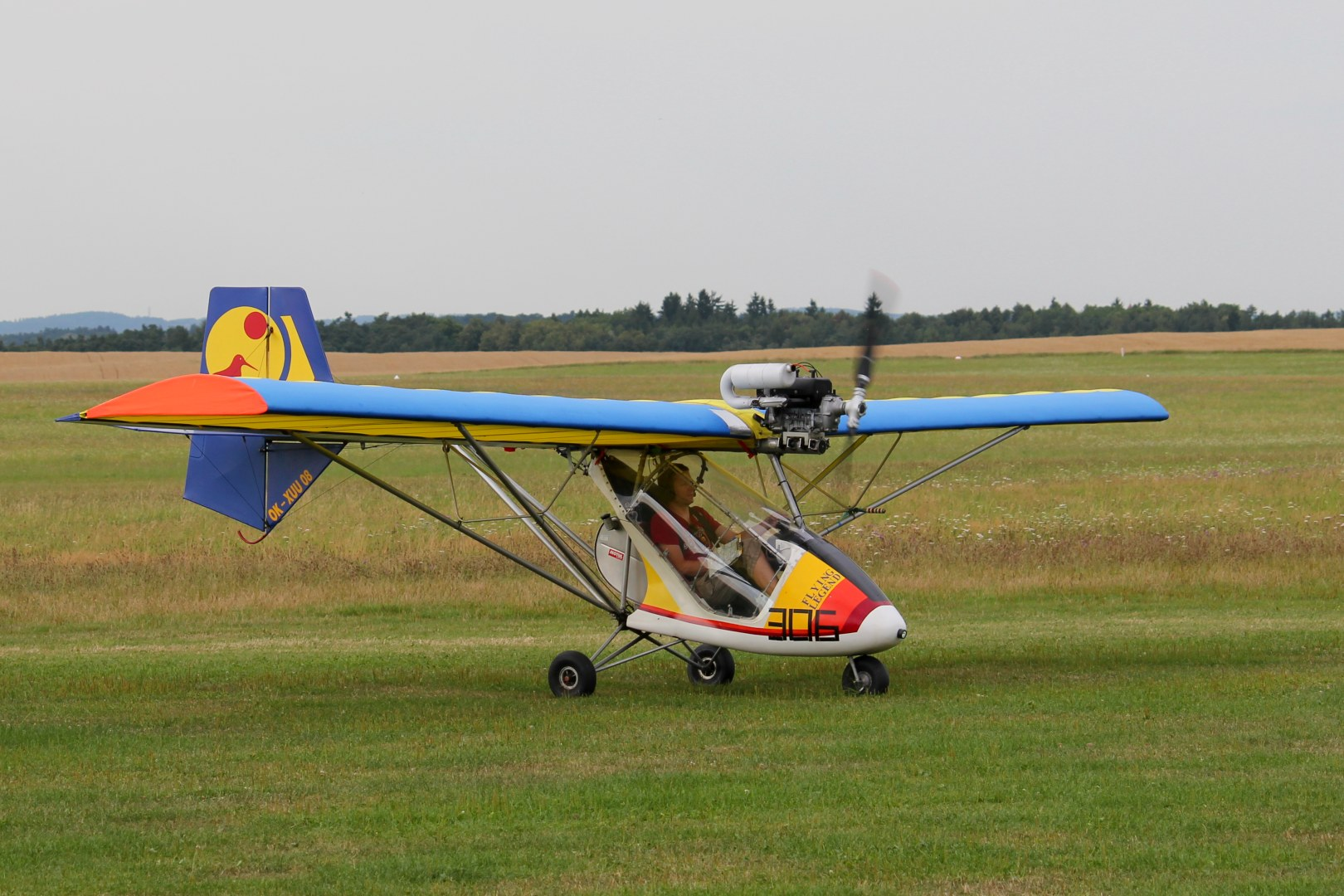
Sluka taxiing on Benešov airfield

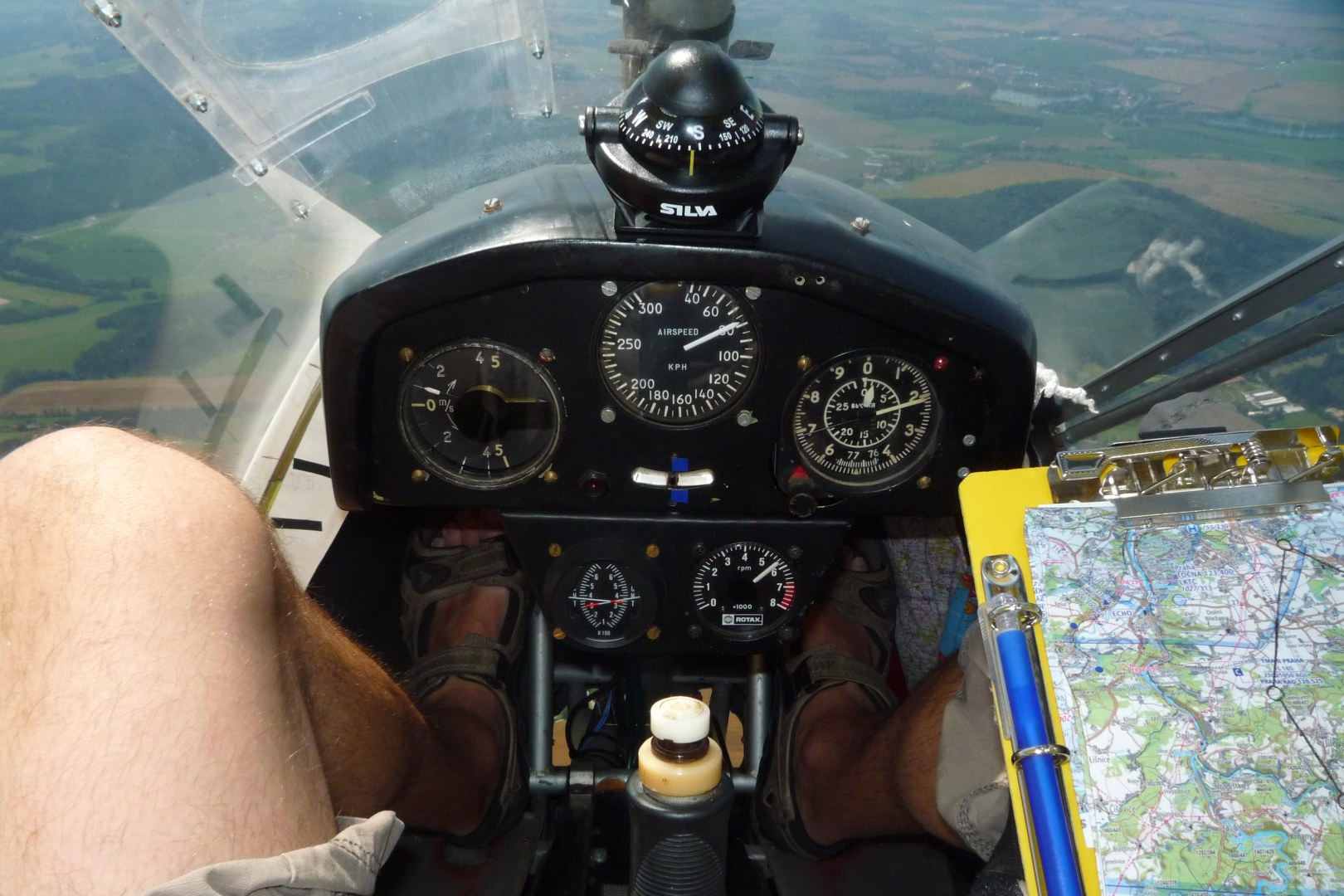
Cabin with instrument panel

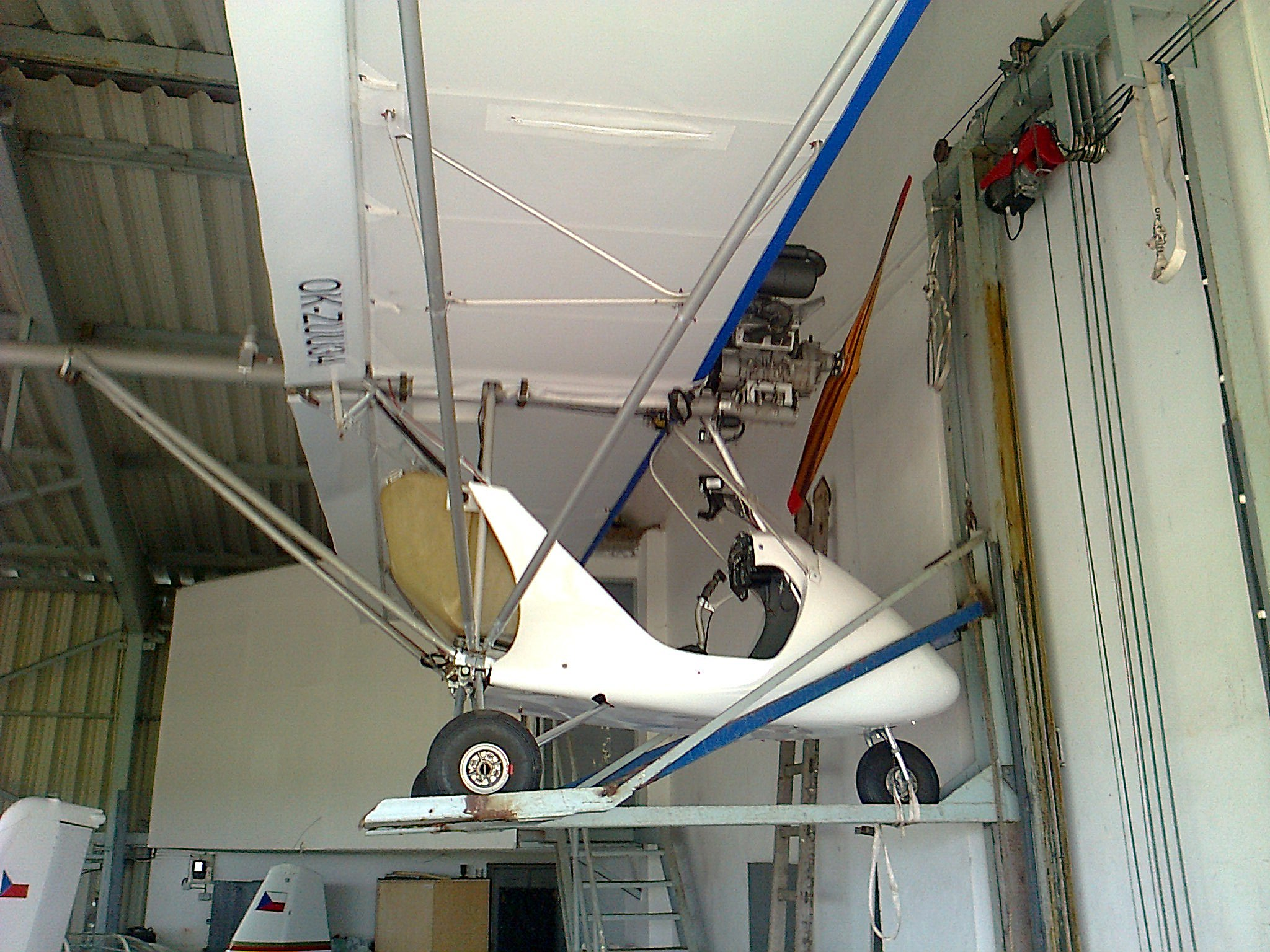
Custom LK-2 Sluka built in 2010s with the original tube main landing gear, open cabin and a composite fuel tank.

Letov LK-2 Sluka is a Czech single-seat high-wing ultralight aircraft produced by the Letov aircraft factory in 1990s and later as a kitbuilt or custom production using tools and material which remained after the closing of the factory production. Sluka is a simple, cheap and easy to fly aircraft which contributed to a rapid growth of ultralight flying organized by then established Light Aircraft Association (LAA - Letecká amatérská asociace) in the Czech Republic. Its main purpose is a local hobby flying and a flight training as a complement to twin seat elementary trainers like Letov LK-3 and ST-4 or TL-32 Typhoon. Sluka does not offer any advanced training possibilities in respect of performance, speed, ceiling or aerobatics compared to the mentioned twin seat models but its purchase price and cost per flight hour are lower. In 2010s it is usually operated by private owners and enthusiasts as it never was widely used in aero clubs which preferred modern composite or metal designs with better performance and fuel economy usually powered by the 4-stroke Rotax 912.

== Design and development ==
The design is common to many other low-cost aircraft, aluminium alloy tube strut-based construction fixed to the central fuselage tube, high wing with pre-sewn fabric envelope with life-span of 5–10 years. Cabin nacelle with open or closed (upgraded M model) windshield is fixed below the tube, tricycle landing gear is suspended with elastic ropes or the main gear is fixed on a composite spring leg for the M model. Front wheel is steered with a rudder and is equipped with a simple brake and a handle on the stick. Flight controls are standard 3-axis with flight stick, rudder and a throttle on the left side of the cabin.

Standard 25 litre fuel tank is placed behind the pilot seat and gives about 2 hours of flight time. It was usually replaced with a bigger one of 50 litre capacity. Composite 50 litre tank is used on later models.

Popular two-stroke, two-valve, air-cooled Rotax engines type 447, 503 or 582 are used with 447 attached to the Rotax "B-type" gearbox being the factory standard. Engine is fixed in front of the fuselage tube. Two or three-bladed propellers are used given the engine type and owner's requirements. Default engine installation is recoil-started with the handle in the reach of the pilot (above head for the open cabin or pulley below the instrument panel for the closed cabin. There is only one switch for magneto cut-off in standard but it is widely customized with integrated alternate current generator and battery to enable power for electric instruments (radio, GPS), beacons and Rotax electric engine starter making the aircraft more comfortable.

Instruments are usually a basic set given the size of the panel. It consists of variometer, altimeter, speed indicator in the top line and two smaller engine instruments below (revolution counter and valve head temperature indicator). Custom upgrades can be of different kind usually providing communication radios, different GPS devices, integrated engine instruments, Hobbs meter, ELT or turn indicators.

Sluka is easy to fly aircraft requiring only basic skills to handle. Operating envelope enables flying in range of 45–100 km/h speeds with 60 km/h as a best climb and descend speed and 70 km/h for every nonstandard procedure like engine failure. It is very stable in flight and does not require continuous pilot's attention to controls. Spins are not allowed for ultralight aircraft but it is also almost impossible to enter it in Sluka due its stability. Flight control surfaces are effective in every situation. Maintenance is also easy as there is almost no cowling, engine and fuel installation can be easily inspected and steel wire controls are mounted on the main fuselage tube.

== Operational history ==
The type was introduced as a prototype shortly before the collapse of the communist regime. Its design was then adapted for the newly established Ultralight association as a future type to enable private flying with low costs being sold to existing Aeroclubs. It was produced in the Letov factory until its bankruptcy in 1998 when Letov Letecká výroba (Letov Aircraft production) was sold to Group Latécoère and production of LK-2, LK-3 and ST-4 was cancelled including any maintenance or support to the owners. Sluka is still popular in the Czech Republic and United Kingdom to where it was exported. Although the factory production was cancelled, limited production is still in place as of 2012 using the remaining tools and material purchased by a private builder. Aircraft is custom-built on customer demand in required configuration with an open or closed cabin. Twin-seat variant (probably LK-3 Nova) is also available.

There is no fatal incident reported with the LK-2s in the Czech Republic as of 2012 but one was reported in UK on the AAIB site in 2006.

== Variants ==
LK-2
Original model with open cabin windshield, strut based main gear and 25 litre fuel tank.
LK-2M
Improved model with closed canopy and a door on the right side and single spring composite main gear leg.
LK-2MT
Similar to M but with a wooden wing with more efficient wing profile which offers higher speed and lower fuel consumption.
LK-2H
New design, new technologies, new engine and propeller, folding wings, a 51% fast build kit or as a ready-to-fly aircraft compliant with the EASA CS-LSA.

== Specifications (LK-2) ==
Data from Original aircraft operating manual

General characteristics

- Crew: one
- Length: 5.1 m (16 ft 9 in)
- Wingspan: 9.2 m (30 ft 2 in)
- Height: 2.5 m (8 ft 2 in)
- Wing area: 13.34 m^{2} (143.6 sq ft)
- Empty weight: 147 kg (324 lb) with Rotax 447
- Gross weight: 250 kg (551 lb)
- Fuel capacity: 25L (50L fuel tank is usually used instead of the default one)
- Powerplant: 1 × Rotax 447 or 503 twin cylinder, two-stroke aircraft engine, 29.5 kW (40 hp)
- Propellers: 2-bladed V 230, 1.625 m (5 ft 4 in) diameter (different 2-3 bladed props are used)

Performance

- Maximum speed: 120 km/h (75 mph, 65 kn)
- Cruise speed: 70 km/h (43 mph, 38 kn)
- Stall speed: 42 km/h (26 mph, 23 kn)
- Never exceed speed: 130 km/h (81 mph, 70 kn)
- Range: 200 km (120 mi, 110 nmi) with 25L tank + reserve
- Endurance: 2h:50min with 25L tank + reserve
- Service ceiling: 4,000 m (13,000 ft) practical ceiling 3.400 m
- g limits: +4G, -2G
- Maximum glide ratio: 1:6.406
- Rate of climb: 3.5 m/s (690 ft/min) at 60 km/h
- Rate of sink: 2.9 m/s (570 ft/min) at 60 km/h, engine off

== See also ==
- Letov aircraft factory

Aircraft of comparable role, configuration, and era

- AUI Bunyip
- Letov LK-3 Nova – twin seat variant of Sluka
- Letov ST-4 Aztec – twin seat advanced design
- TL-32 Typhoon – twin seat
