= Letov ST-4 Aztek =

Czech ultralight aircraft

ST-4 Aztek
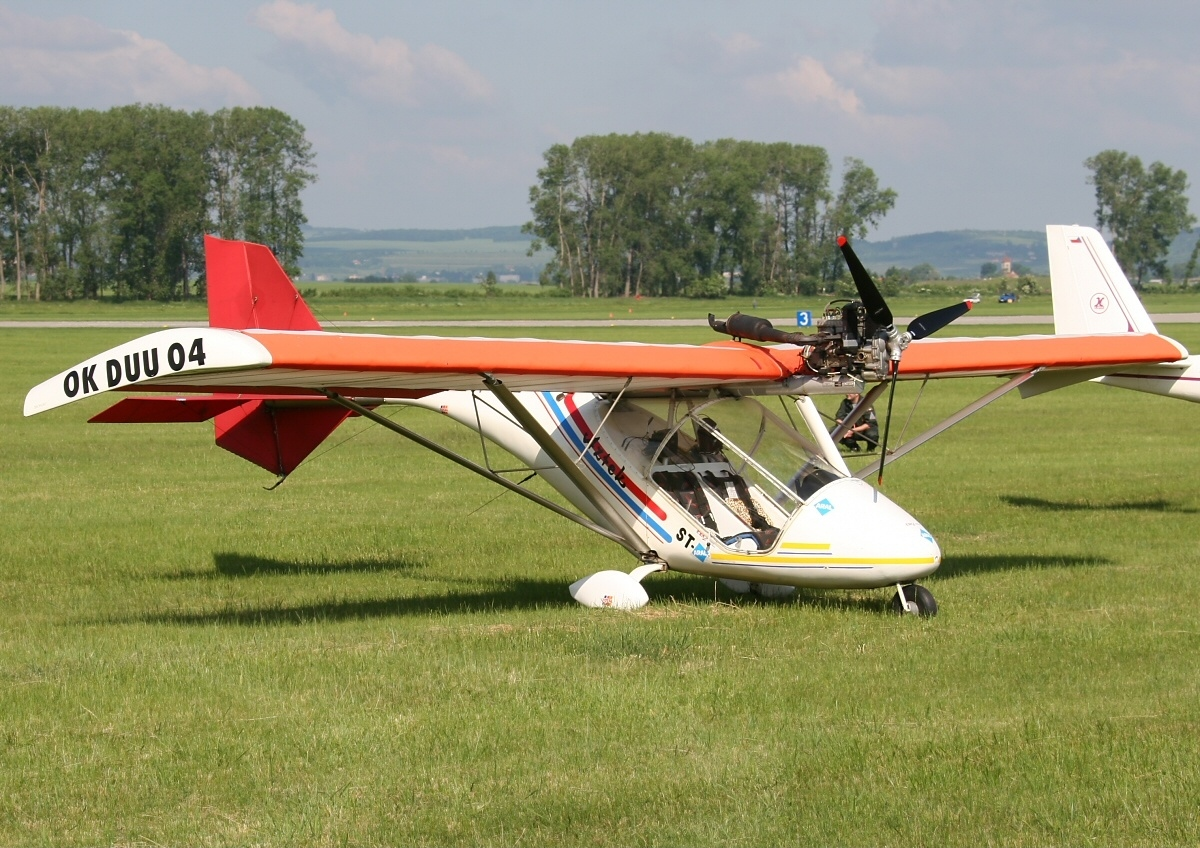

General information
- Type: Microlight aircraft
- National origin: Czech Republic
- Manufacturer: Letov Kbely
- Status: Production completed
- Number built: 15 (1998)

The Letov ST-4 Aztek (English: Aztec) is a Czech microlight aircraft that was designed and produced by Letov Kbely of Prague - Letňany, in the 1990s. When it was available, the aircraft was supplied as a complete ready-to-fly aircraft, or as a kit for amateur construction.

In January 2014, the ST-4 was no longer listed as a product of the company.

== Design and development ==
The aircraft was designed to comply with the Fédération Aéronautique Internationale microlight category, including the category's maximum gross weight of 450 kg (992 lb). The ST-4 Aztek features a strut-braced high-wing, a two-seats-in-side-by-side configuration enclosed cockpit, fixed tricycle landing gear with wheel pants, a small tailskid and a single engine in tractor configuration.

The aircraft is made from aluminum tubing with fairings made from fibreglass and its flying surfaces are covered in Dacron sailcloth. Its 10.40 m (34.1 ft) span wing mounts flaps and has a wing area of 15.21 m^{2} (163.7 sq ft). The wings are supported by V-struts with jury struts and the empennage is cable-braced. The acceptable power range is 45 to 50 hp (34 to 37 kW) and the standard engine used is the 50 hp (37 kW) Rotax 503 two-stroke powerplant. The engine is mounted high above the cockpit on the front end of the aluminum tube that acts as the tailboom.

The ST-4 Aztek has a typical empty weight of 220 kg (490 lb) and a gross weight of 450 kg (990 lb), giving a useful load of 230 kg (510 lb). With full fuel of 57 litres (13 imp gal; 15 US gal) the payload for pilot, passenger and baggage is 189 kg (417 lb).

The manufacturer estimated the construction time from the supplied kit as 80 hours.

== Operational history ==
By 1998 the company reported that 26 kits had been sold, and that 15 aircraft were completed and flying.

== Specifications (ST-4 Aztek) ==
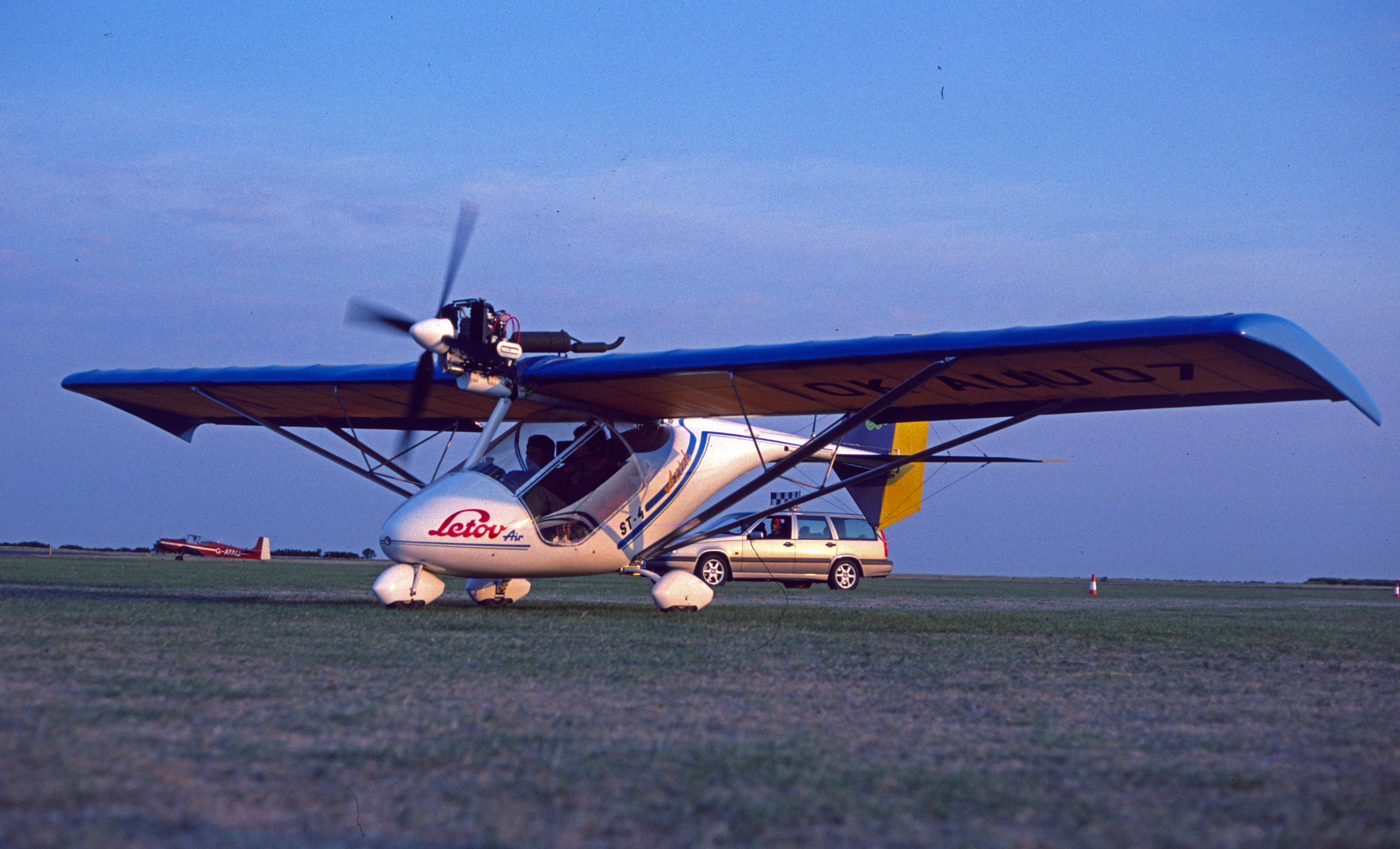
Letov ST-4 Aztek

Data from AeroCrafter

General characteristics

- Crew: one
- Capacity: one passenger
- Length: 5.91 m (19.40 ft)
- Wingspan: 10.40 m (34 ft 1 in)
- Wing area: 15.21 m^{2} (163.7 sq ft)
- Empty weight: 220 kg (484 lb)
- Gross weight: 450 kg (992 lb)
- Fuel capacity: 15 U.S. gallons (57 L; 12 imp gal)
- Powerplant: 1 × Rotax 503 twin cylinder, air-cooled, two stroke aircraft engine, 37 kW (50 hp)
- Propellers: 4-bladed composite

Performance

- Maximum speed: 132 km/h (82 mph, 71 kn)
- Cruise speed: 97 km/h (60 mph, 52 kn)
- Stall speed: 50 km/h (31 mph, 27 kn) flaps down
- Range: 341 km (212 mi, 184 nmi)
- Service ceiling: 2,700 m (9,000 ft)
- Rate of climb: 3.8 m/s (750 ft/min)
- Wing loading: 29.5 kg/m^{2} (6.05 lb/sq ft)
