= Letov Š-7 =

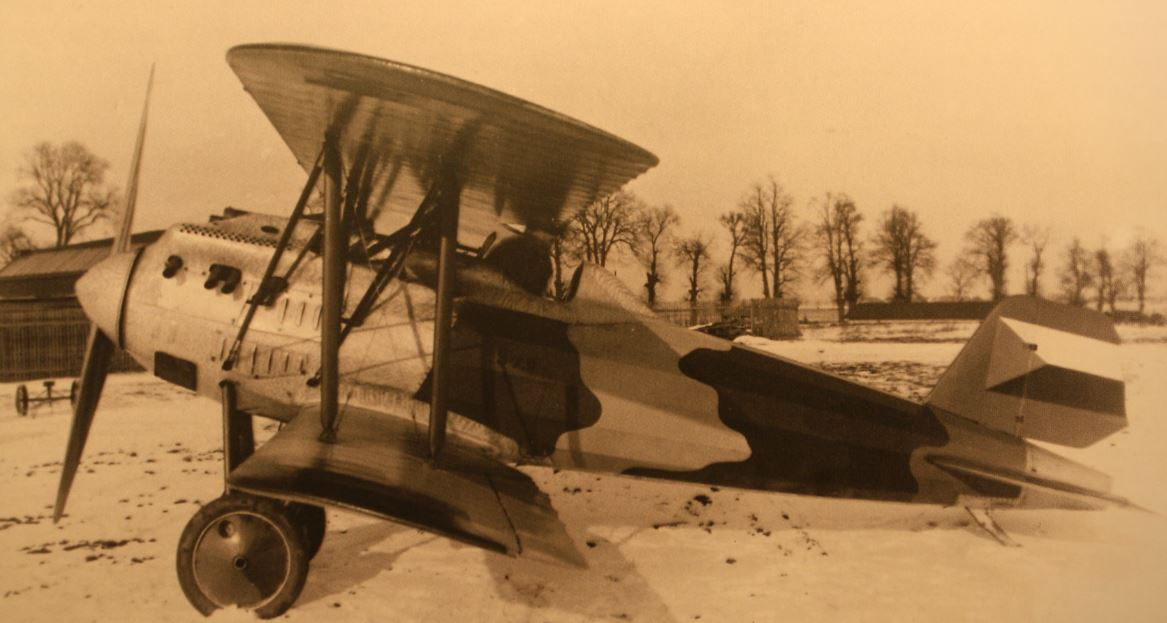

General information
- Type: Single-seat fighter
- National origin: Czechoslovakia
- Manufacturer: Letov Kbely
- Designer: Alois Šmolik
- Number built: 1

History
- First flight: 1923

The Letov Š-7 was a single-seat, single-engine biplane fighter aircraft designed and built in Czechoslovakia in the early 1920s. It was designed for a single-seat fighter competition but did not reach production.

== Design and development ==
The Letov Š-7 was designed for a 1923 government competition for a single-engine fighter, to be powered by a Škoda licence-built Hispano-Suiza 8Fb, a 300 hp (224 kW) water-cooled V-8 engine. It was a single-bay biplane, the bays defined by parallel pairs of interplane struts. The wings, mounted with modest stagger, were straight edged and had the same constant chord and blunt wingtips. The upper wing was braced to the fuselage with a cabane formed, on each side, by a forward parallel pair of struts from the mid-fuselage and a rear inverted-V pair from the upper fuselage. Only the lower planes carried ailerons.

Letov experienced some cooling problems with the Š-7's water-cooled engine. The aircraft as first flown had a ring-shaped radiator, but this was replaced with a transversely mounted, circular cross-section ventral radiator and the engine cowling revised. The modification resulted in a change of designation to Letov Š-7a. The Hispano engine drove a two-blade propeller with a domed spinner. Behind the engine, the fuselage had an oval cross-section, with the single open cockpit partially under the wing trailing edge, which had a shallow cutout to enhance his view. The fuselage tapered rearwards to a point behind the tail control surfaces. The straight edged, cropped lozenge-shaped horizontal tail was mounted on the fuselage centreline; the fin and rudder were also straight edged. The Š-7 had a fixed, single-axle conventional undercarriage, with mainwheels on cross-braced V-struts. It was armed with a pair of 7.7 mm (0.303 in) machine guns, mounted in a dip in the engine cowling between the two cylinder banks, firing through the propeller arc.

The Letov Š-7 first flew in 1923 but failed to gain orders and its development was discontinued.

== Variants ==
Letov Š-7
Original ring-shaped radiator.
Letov Š-7a
Ventral radiator and modified cowling.

== Specifications ==
Data from Green and Swanborough p.333

General characteristics

- Crew: one
- Length: 6.97 m (22 ft 10 in)
- Wingspan: 9.30 m (30 ft 6 in)
- Height: 2.65 m (8 ft 8 in)
- Wing area: 22.15 m^{2} (238.4 sq ft)
- Empty weight: 763 kg (1,682 lb)
- Gross weight: 1,050 kg (2,315 lb)
- Powerplant: 1 × Hispano-Suiza 8Fb V8 water-cooled, 220 kW (300 hp)
- Propellers: 2-bladed

Performance

- Maximum speed: 255 km/h (158 mph, 138 kn)
- Time to altitude: 1.5 min to 1,000 m (3,050 ft)

Armament

- Guns: 2 × 7.7 mm (0.303 in) machine guns
