= Letov LF-107 Luňák =

LF-107 Luňák
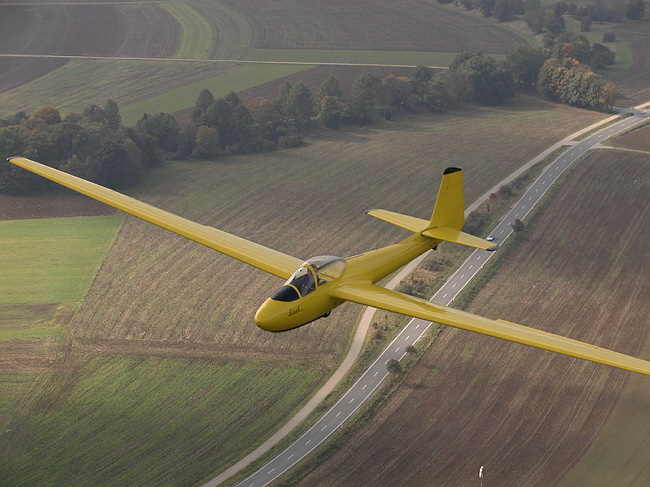

General information
- Type: Aerobatic glider
- Manufacturer: Letov
- Number built: 75

History
- First flight: 25 June 1948

The LF-107 Luňák (English: Kite, the bird of prey) is a Czech aerobatic glider designed by Prague-based company Rudý Letov in the late 1940s. The design was developed within a prolific group of aeronautical engineers and sailplane pilots, including K. Dlouhý (later author of LET L-13 Blaník), J. Matejček, and B. Boček, led by chief designer Vladimír Štros.

== Design and development ==
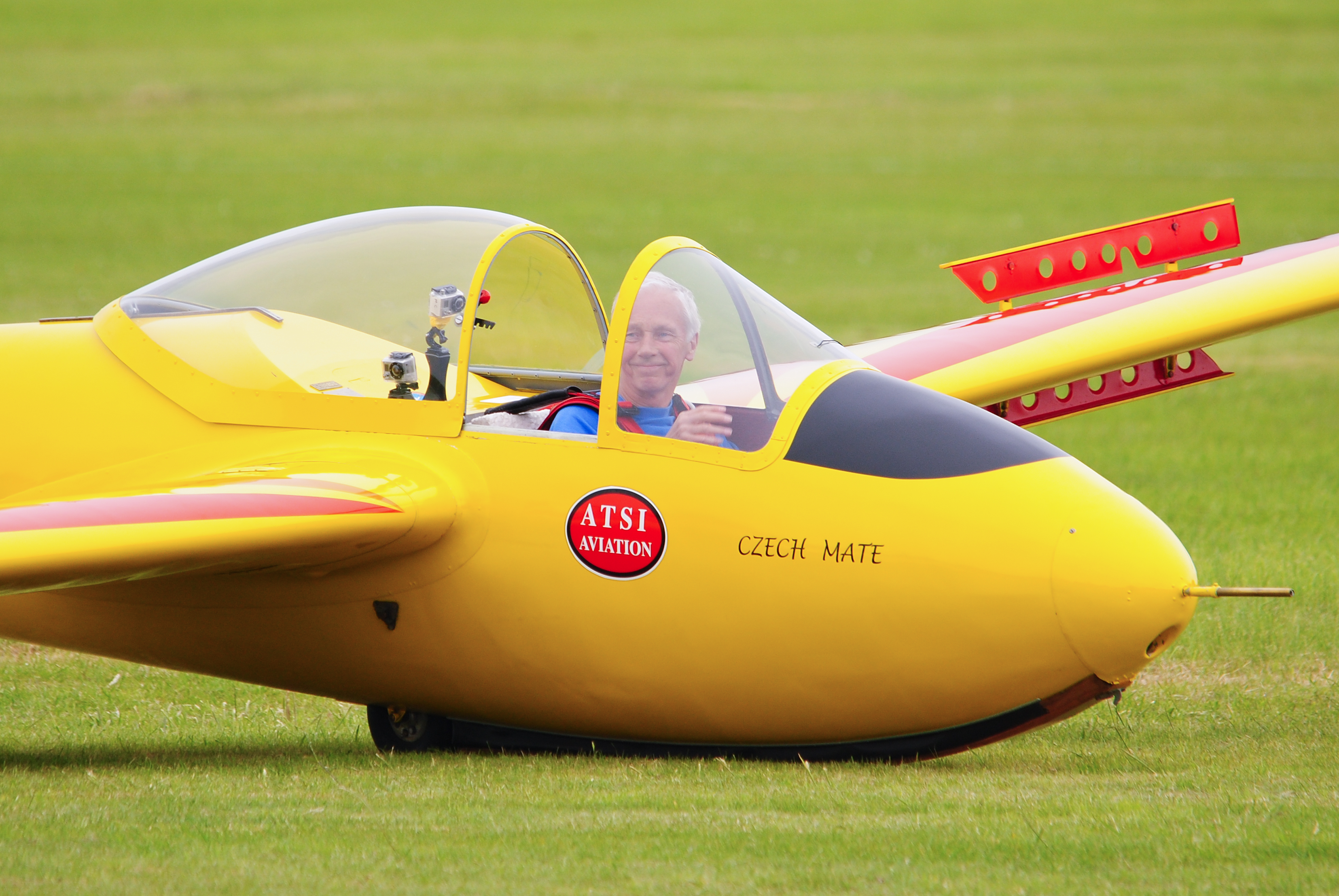
LF-107 at Old Warden, 2013

The first flight of the prototype took place on June 25, 1948, and a second prototype flew in July. The prototype participated later in the same year in aerobatic competition in Grenchen, Switzerland, and in Ziar, Poland in 1949, where its good aerobatic and gliding characteristics drew considerable attention.

Unfortunately, serial production was disrupted by geopolitical developments, as the factory was charged with production of MiG-15, MiG-19, MiG-21F aircraft, and access to Western civil export markets were progressively hampered by the emergence of the Iron Curtain. Therefore, only 75 examples of the Luňák were produced.

In 1950, a variant with simpler construction and a revised cockpit, among other changes, was developed. This LF-107 Luňák of wooden construction designated Letov VT-7 under the military training system was instrumental in the development of gliding and aerobatics in the Czech Republic. The LF-107 was also used for aerobatic training in the Soviet Union, Bulgaria, Romania and Poland.

=== XLF-207 Laminar ===
The Letov XLF-207 Laminar, a derivative of the Luňák, was the first glider in the world with a laminar flow wing. Its maiden flight took place in Praha Letnany in August 1951. Research into laminar flow wings was carried out by the XLF-207 Laminar, an LF-107 fitted with laminar flow wings. Presently there are only nine airworthy Luňáks, two of which are in the United Kingdom. A Luňák is displayed in the American Museum of Flight.

== Variants ==
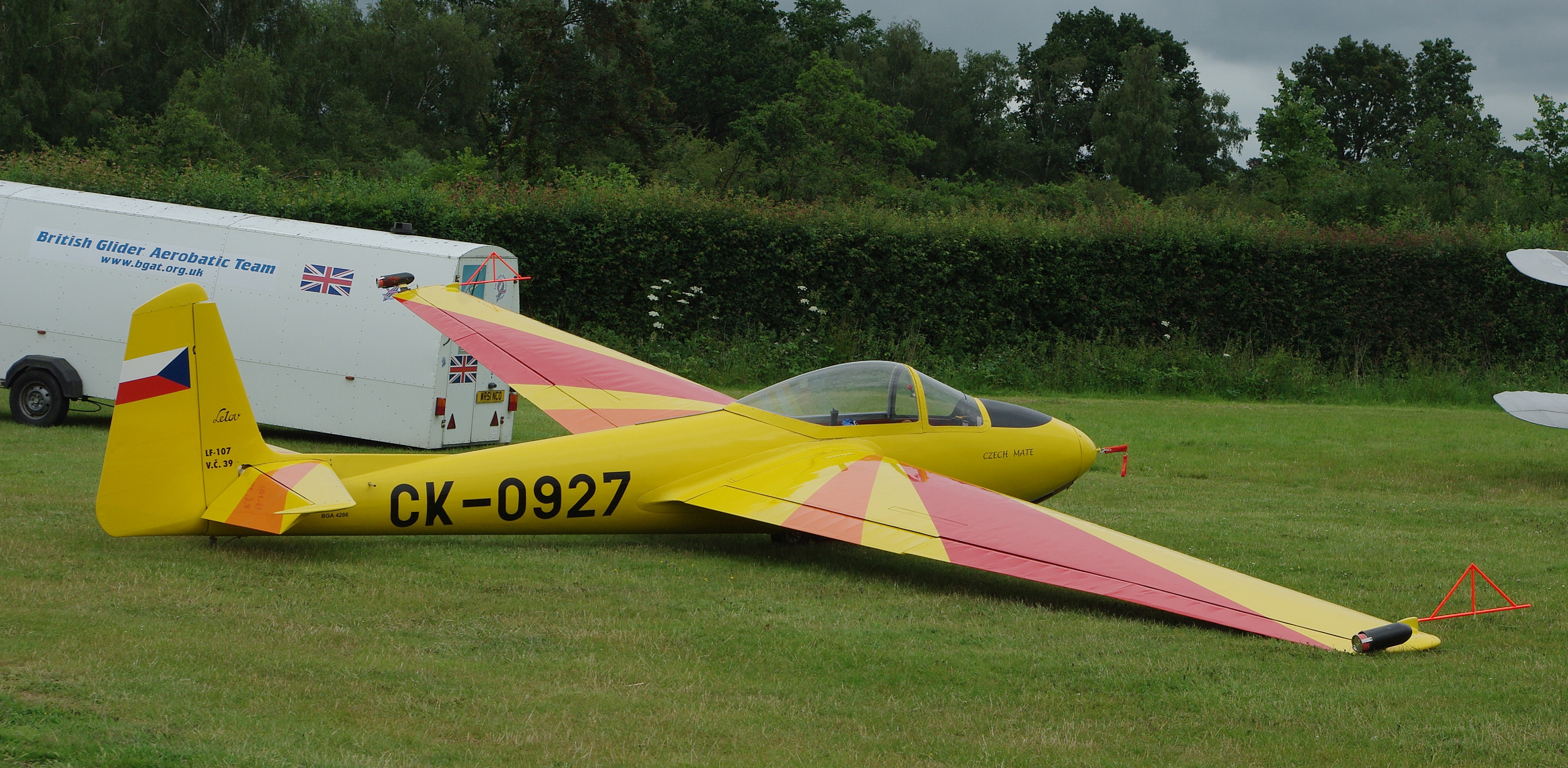
Lunak kitted out for aerobatics at Old Warden, June 2014

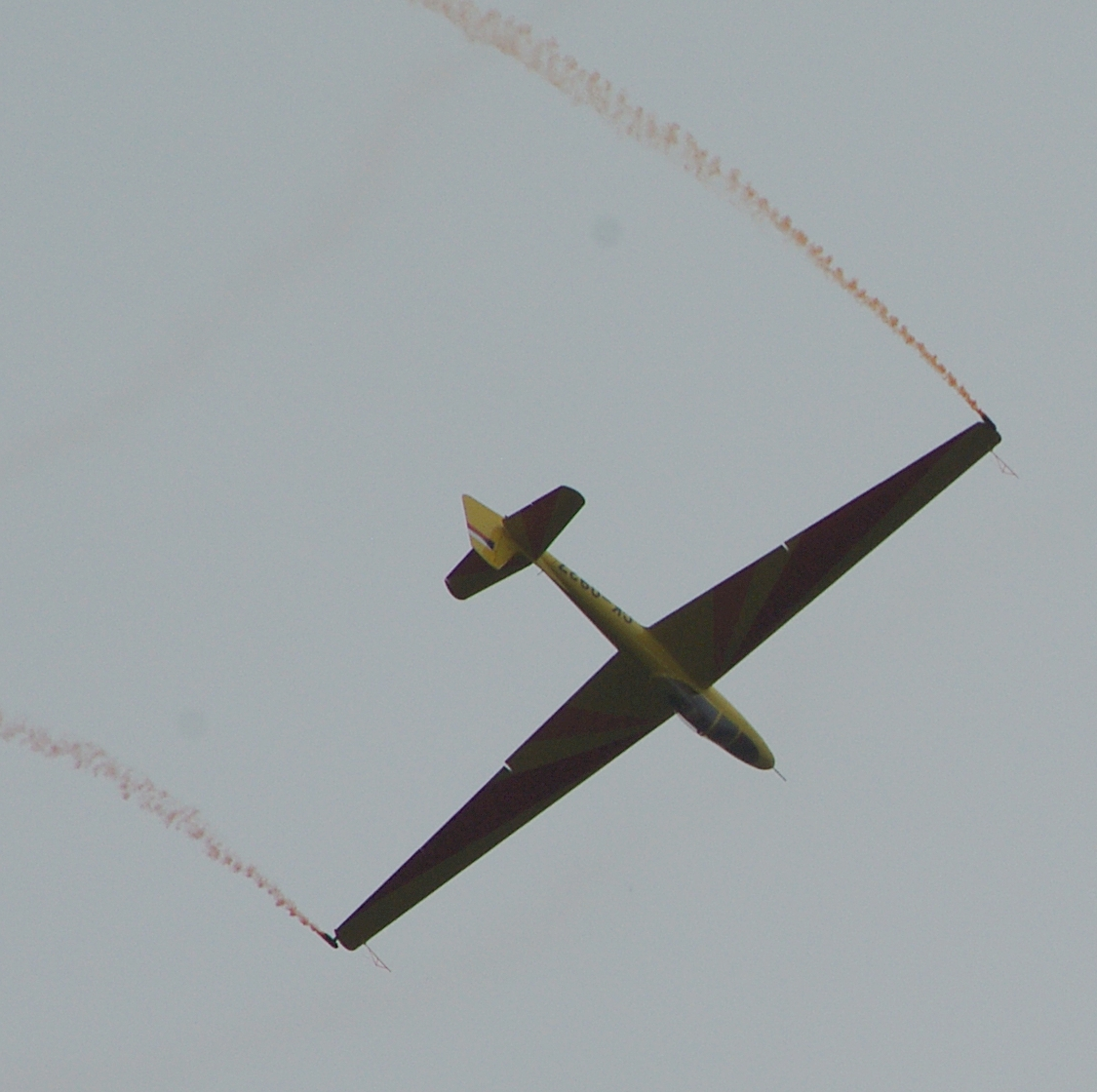
Lunak doing aerobatics

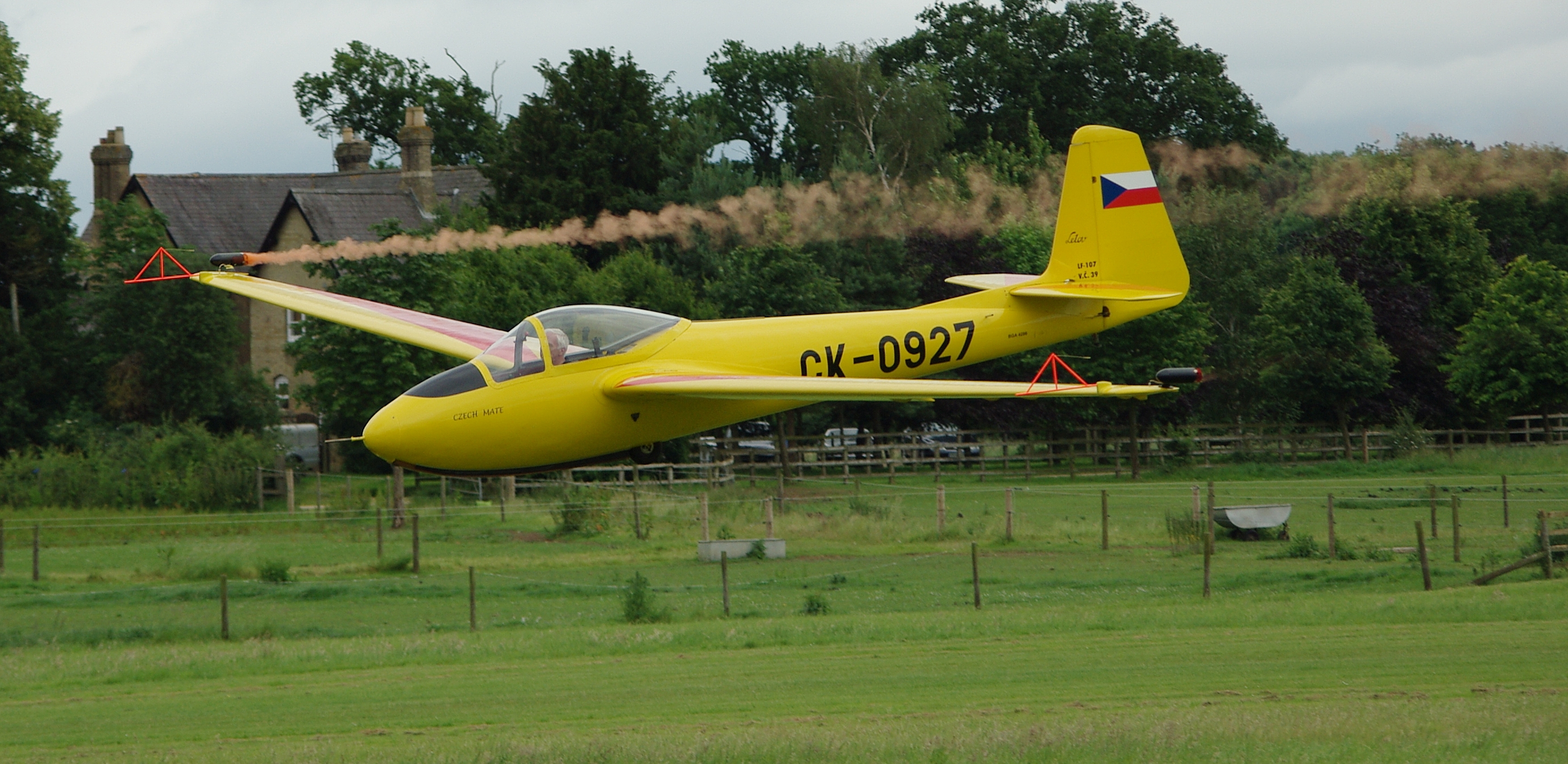
Lunak landing

LF-107 Luňák
The initial production version of this aerobatic glider, 75 built.
VT-7
Simpler construction with a revised cockpit for use by the Czech military.
XLF-207 Laminar
The Letov XLF-207 Laminar was the first glider in the world with a laminar flow wing. Its maiden flight took place in Praha Letnany in August 1951.

== Specifications (LF-107 Luňák) ==
Data from

General characteristics

- Crew: one
- Length: 6.78 m (22 ft 3 in)
- Wingspan: 14.27 m (46 ft 10 in)
- Wing area: 13.38 m^{2} (144.0 sq ft)
- Aspect ratio: 15.22
- Empty weight: 205 kg (452 lb)
- Gross weight: 310 kg (683 lb)

Performance

- Maximum speed: 300 km/h (190 mph, 160 kn)
- Maximum glide ratio: 24 at 80 km/h (43 kn)
- Rate of sink: 0.85 m/s (167 ft/min) at 65 km/h (35 kn)

== See also ==
- List of gliders
