= Letov Š-22 =

Military aircraft

General information
- Type: Single-seat fighter
- National origin: Czechoslovakia
- Manufacturer: Letov Kbely
- Designer: Alois Šmolik
- Number built: 1

History
- First flight: March 1926

The Letov Š-22 was a single-seat, single-engine aircraft designed and built in Czechoslovakia in the mid-1920s. A parasol-wing Dewoitine-style fighter, it was not successful, and only one was built.

== Design and development ==
The Letov Š-22's designer Alois Šmolik briefly interrupted his series of biplane fighters with this Dewoitine-influenced parasol-wing monoplane. It was powered by a 336 kW (450 hp) Škoda L W-12 water-cooled engine, with three banks of four cylinders, driving a two-blade propeller. This engine was a Škoda version of the Hispano-Suiza 12Gb, with a new lower crankcase. The Š-22 was an all-metal design.

The wing was straight-edged with constant chord and blunt wing tips. It was braced to the lower fuselage with faired N-struts on each side. The engine was tightly cowled, the fairing following each cylinder bank individually. The pilot sat in an open cockpit just behind the wing trailing edge, and behind him the round fuselage tapered only gently. The braced tailplane, carrying split elevators, was mounted at the top of the fuselage and a straight-edged fin carried a round-topped rudder which extended to the keel. The Š-22 had a fixed, conventional undercarriage, with mainwheels on V-struts. It was to be armed with a pair of 7.70 mm (0.303 in) synchronised Vickers machine guns firing through the propeller arc.

The Š-22 first flew in March 1926, but by the end of April Letov had decided it was not viable, and development ceased.

== Specifications ==
Data from Green and Swanborough p.334

General characteristics

- Crew: One
- Length: 7.65 m (25 ft 1 in)
- Wingspan: 10.18 m (33 ft 5 in)
- Wing area: 15.59 m^{2} (167.8 sq ft)
- Empty weight: 934 kg (2,059 lb)
- Gross weight: 1,285 kg (2,833 lb)
- Powerplant: 1 × Škoda L W-12 water-cooled, 340 kW (450 hp)
- Propellers: 2-bladed
