= Letov Kbely =

Czech aircraft manufacturer

Coordinates: 50°7′58.94″N 14°31′13.67″E

- LATECOERE Czech Republic

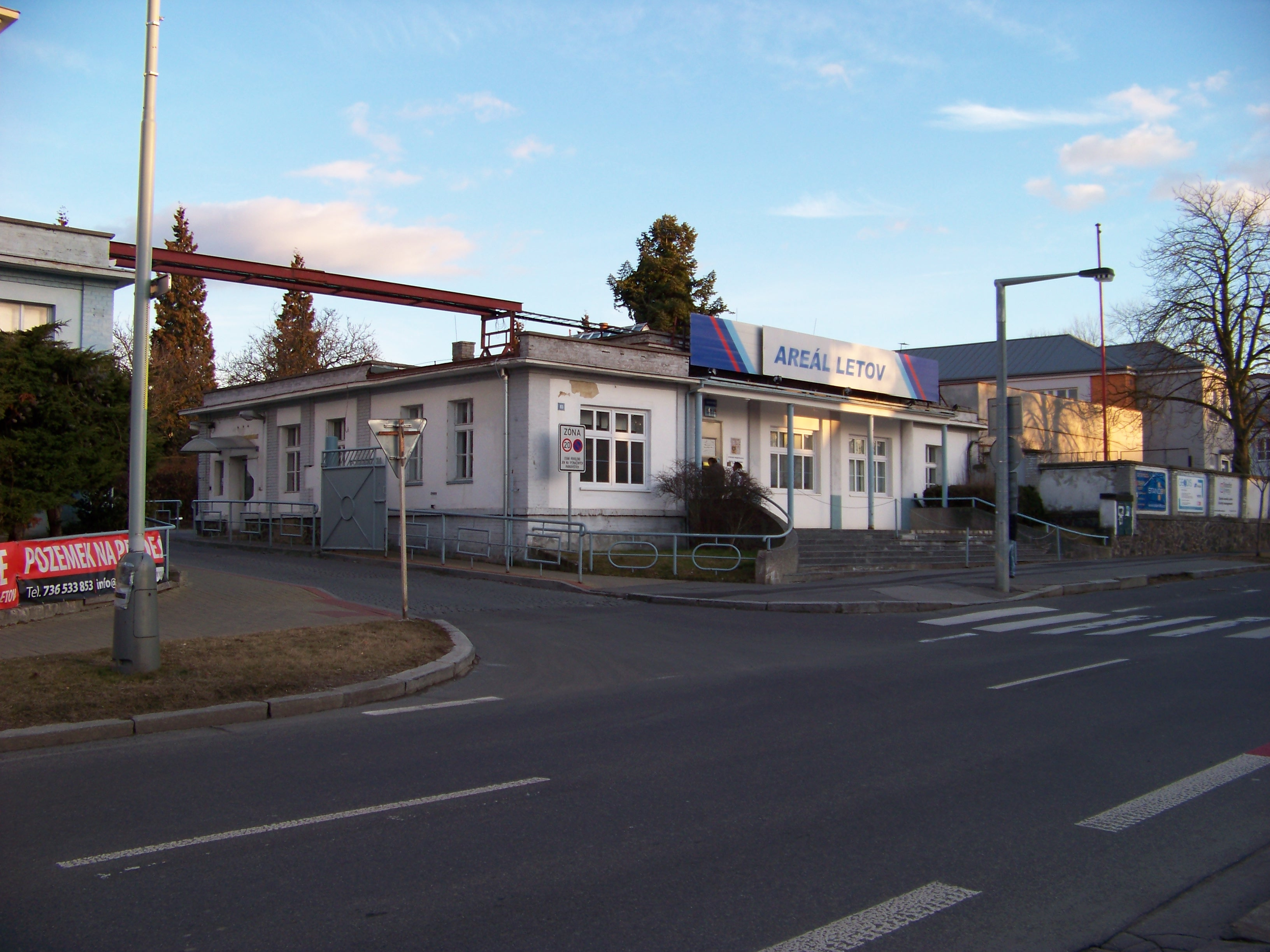
- Industry: Aerospace
- Founded: 1918
- Fate: Purchased by Groupe Latécoère in 2000
- Headquarters: Prague-Letňany, Czech Republic
- Parent: Groupe Latécoère (2000–present)
- Website: www.latecoere.aero/en/latecoere-ceska-republika/

Letov is an aircraft company located in Letňany district of Prague, Czech Republic. It is the oldest aircraft company in the region.

== History ==
Letov was founded in 1918 by the Czechoslovak Ministry of Defense to repair World War I trophy planes. The first indigenous aircraft, the Letov Š-1, was designed and built in 1920, and some 50 aircraft types were built by 1939. During World War II the factory served as repair shop for the German Luftwaffe. Production lines were also set up during World War II for combat versions of the Ju 290 aircraft, commencing with the Ju 290 A-2, which carried a search radar for its patrol role. Since the 1950s, the plant has manufactured parts for the MiG-15, MiG-19 and MiG-21.

Over 4,000 wings and empennages for L-29 Delfín, a jet trainer aircraft that became the standard jet trainer for the air forces Warsaw Pact nations in the 1960s, were built by Letov. The company has also built wings and empennages for 2500 L-39 Albatros trainer aircraft since the 1970s.

In the early 1990s, Letov began manufacturing emergency exit doors for the Airbus A321. After it was split into several businesses, Groupe Latécoère acquired its aircraft manufacturing division in 2000. The business was renamed Latecoere Czech Republic in 2013. The Prague subsidiary manufactures aircraft components and assembles door structures.

== Aircraft ==
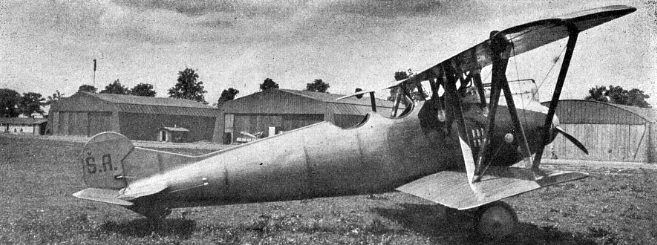
Letov Š-1

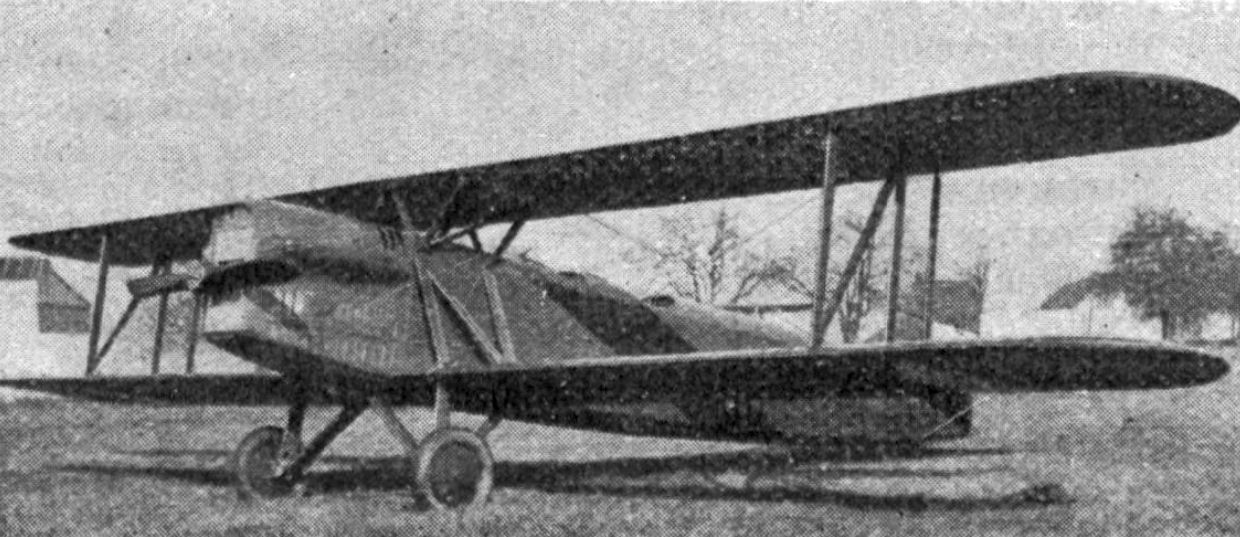
Letov Š-16

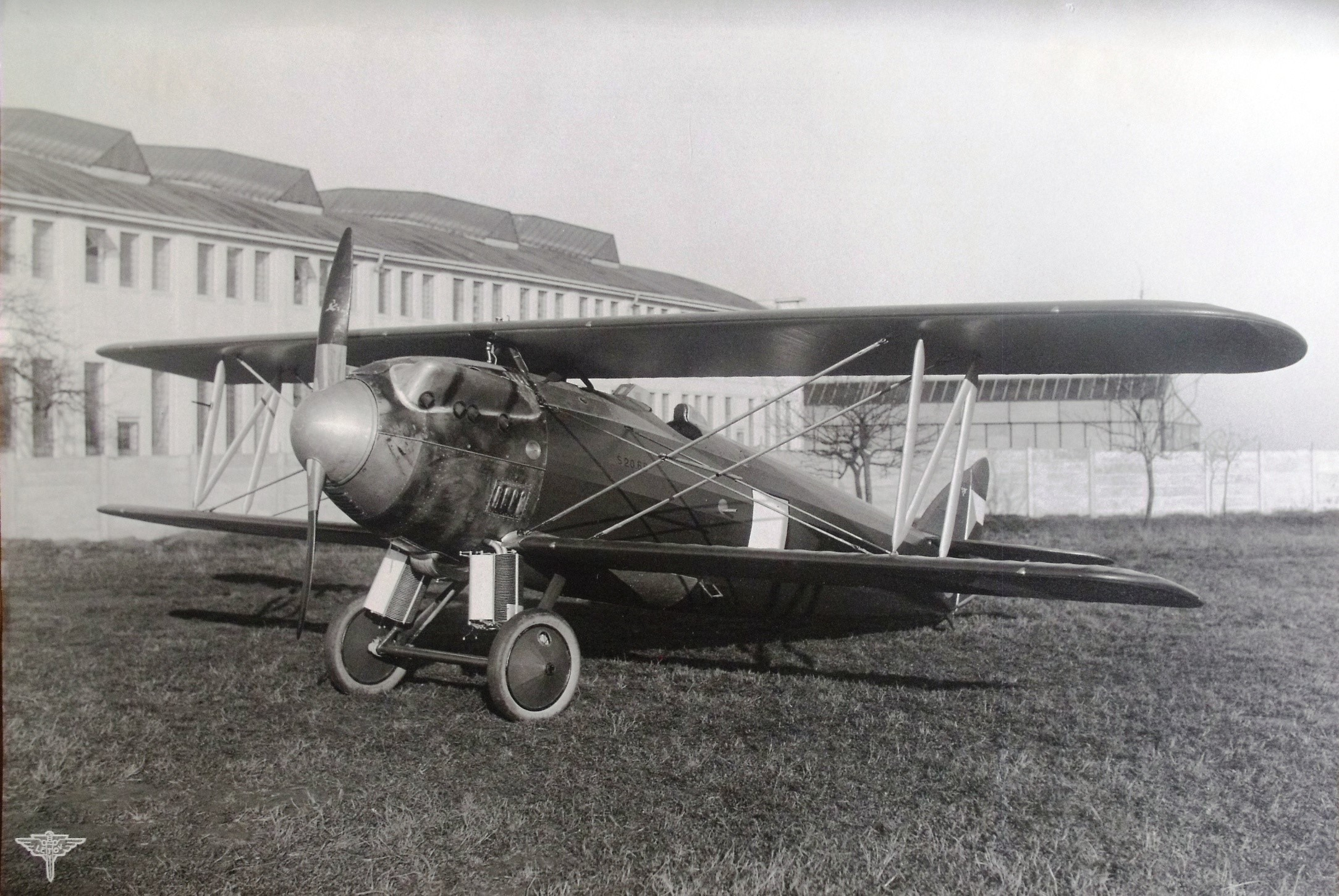
Letov Š-20

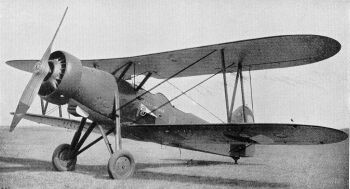
Letov Š-328

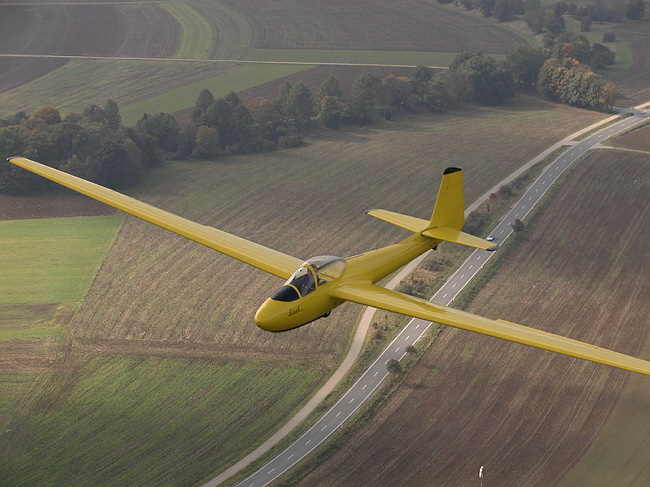
Letov LF-107 Luňák

Model name	First flight	Number built	Type
Letov Š-1	1920	28	Single engine biplane reconnaissance airplane
Letov Š-2	1921	64	Single engine biplane reconnaissance airplane
Letov Š-3	1922	2	Single engine monoplane fighter
Letov Š-4	1922	20	Single engine biplane fighter
Letov Š-5	1923	1	Single engine biplane reconnaissance airplane
Letov Š-6	1923	35	Single engine biplane bomber
Letov Š-7	1923	1	Single engine biplane fighter prototype
Letov Š-8	1923	1	Single engine monoplane racing airplane
Letov Š-9			1923 three-engine bomber project
Letov Š-10		51	Single engine reconnaissance biplane; Hansa-Brandenburg B.I built under license
Letov Š-11			1923 twin-engine bomber project
Letov Š-12	1924	1	Single engine monoplane fighter prototype
Letov Š-13	1924	1	Single engine biplane fighter prototype
Letov Š-14	1924	1	Single engine biplane fighter prototype
Letov Š-15 (I)			1924 four-engine monoplane airliner project
Letov Š-15 (II)			1926 light experimental sports plane
Letov Š-16	1926	89	Single engine biplane bomber
Letov Š-17	1929	1	Single engine biplane bomber prototype
Letov Š-18	1925	46	Single engine biplane trainer
Letov Š-19	1924	9	Single engine biplane airliner; civilian version of Š-6
Letov Š-20	1925	~118	Single engine biplane fighter
Letov Š-21		1	Single engine biplane trainer
Letov Š-22	1926	1	Single engine monoplane fighter
Letov Š-24			1927 night bomber project; based on Š-16
Letov Š-25	1930	1	Single engine biplane trainer
Letov Š-27 (I)			1928 three-engine, 18 passenger airliner project
Letov Š-27 (II)			1931 training aircraft project; two built but cancelled before completion
Letov Š-28	1929	1	Single engine reconnaissance biplane prototype
Letov Š-29 (I)			1927 four-engine biplane bomber project
Letov Š-29 (II)			1929 four-engine monoplane bomber project
Letov Š-30			Large four-engine biplane airliner project
Letov Š-31	1929	33	Single engine biplane fighter
Letov Š-32	1931	5	Three engine monoplane airliner
Letov Š-33	1930	1	Single engine monoplane bomber
Letov Š-34 (I)			late 1920s three-engine bomber project
Letov Š-34 (II)			1930 single-engine monoplane bomber project; Š-33 derivative
Letov Š-39	1931	21	Single-engine, high-speed sport monoplane
Letov Š-40			1934 twin-engine airliner studies
Letov Š-41			1934 twin-engine airliner studies
Letov Š-42			1935 twin-engine bomber project; derivative of Š-40
Letov Š-43			1936 twin-engine medium bomber project
Letov Š-44			1936 single-seat light fighter project
Letov Š-49			1936 two-seat, two-engine light bomber project
Letov Š-50	1938	1	Two engine monoplane utility airplane
Letov Š-51			1938 fighter project
Letov Š-52			1938 Twin-engine reconnaissance-bomber project
Letov Š-56			1938 all metal, twin-boom attack aircraft/light bomber project
Letov Š-57			1938 two-seat liaison aircraft project
Letov Š-116	1930	12	Bomber version of Š-16
Letov Š-118	1928	2	Š-18 with Walter NZ-85 radial engine
Letov Š-128	1931	12	Š-28 with Gnome et Rhône-built Bristol Mercury VII engine
Letov Š-131	1929	3	Racing version of Š-31
Letov Š-132			1920s bomber/transport airplane project
Letov Š-137			1920 transatlantic airliner project
Letov Š-139	1933	6	Ŝ-39 with Pobjoy R engine and Townend ring
Letov Š-218	1926	63	Development of Š-18 with steel-tube frame and Walter NZ 120 engine
Letov Š-228		4	Version of Š-28 for Estonia with Walter-built Bristol Mercury VII engine
Letov Š-231	1933	35	Š-31 with Walter-built Bristol Mercury engine
Letov Š-239	1935	15	Š-39 with Walter Minor 4 engine
Letov Š-328	1933	~412	Production version of Š-28
Letov Š-331	1935	1	Š-31 with Walter K.14 engine
Letov Š-428		1	Close ground support aircraft version of Š-28
Letov Š-431		1	Š-31 with Armstrong Siddeley Tiger engine
Letov Š-516			Š-16 with Isotta-Fraschini Asso 750 engine
Letov Š-528	1935	6	Planned replacement for Š-328
Letov Š-616	1930	12	Š-16 with Hispano-Suiza 12Nbr engine
Letov Š-716	1930	1	Š-16 with Skoda L engine
Letov Š-816	1931	2	Š-16 with Praga ESV engine
Letov Š-916			Š-16 with Lorraine-Dietrich engine
Letov L-42			1960 twin engine business jet/trainer project
Letov L-43			1960 twin engine STOL light transport/trainer project
Letov L-48			1960 24-seat twin engine regional airliner project
Letov L-52			1947 jet fighter project, based on the Me 262
Letov L-53			Observation/artillery spotting/multipurpose airplane project
Letov L-101	N/A	0	Two engine monoplane airliner
Letov L-103			1946 30-seat, twin-engine pressurized airliner project
Letov L-105			1946 ultralight aircraft project
Letov L-106			1948 twin-boom transport airplane project
Letov L-290 Orel	1946	1	Four engine transport; Junkers Ju 290 built under license
Letov L-501			1946 single engine monoplane fighter project; resembled the P-51 Mustang
Letov LF-107 Luňák	1948	75	Glider
Letov LK-2 Sluka	1988		Ultralight
Letov LK-3 Nova			Ultralight
Letov MK-1 Kocour			Motor glider
Letov ST-4 Aztek			Ultralight
Letov XLA-54	1950	1	Single engine monoplane trainer
Letov XLF-207 Laminar	1951	75	Glider

== See also ==
- Aero Vodochody
- Avia
- Beneš-Mráz
- Let Kunovice
- Zlin Aircraft
