= Letov Š-31 =

Czechoslovak biplane fighter

Š.31
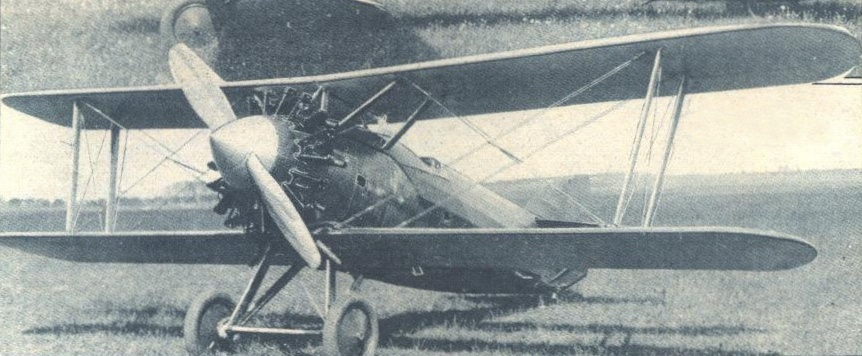
- Letov Š-31

General information
- Type: Fighter
- Manufacturer: Letov
- Primary users: Czechoslovak Air Force Spanish Republican Air Force

History
- First flight: 1929

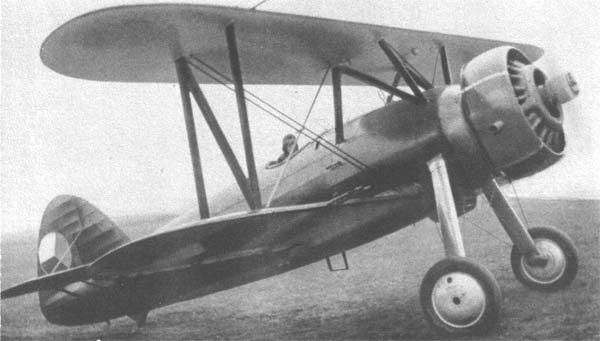
Letov Š-231

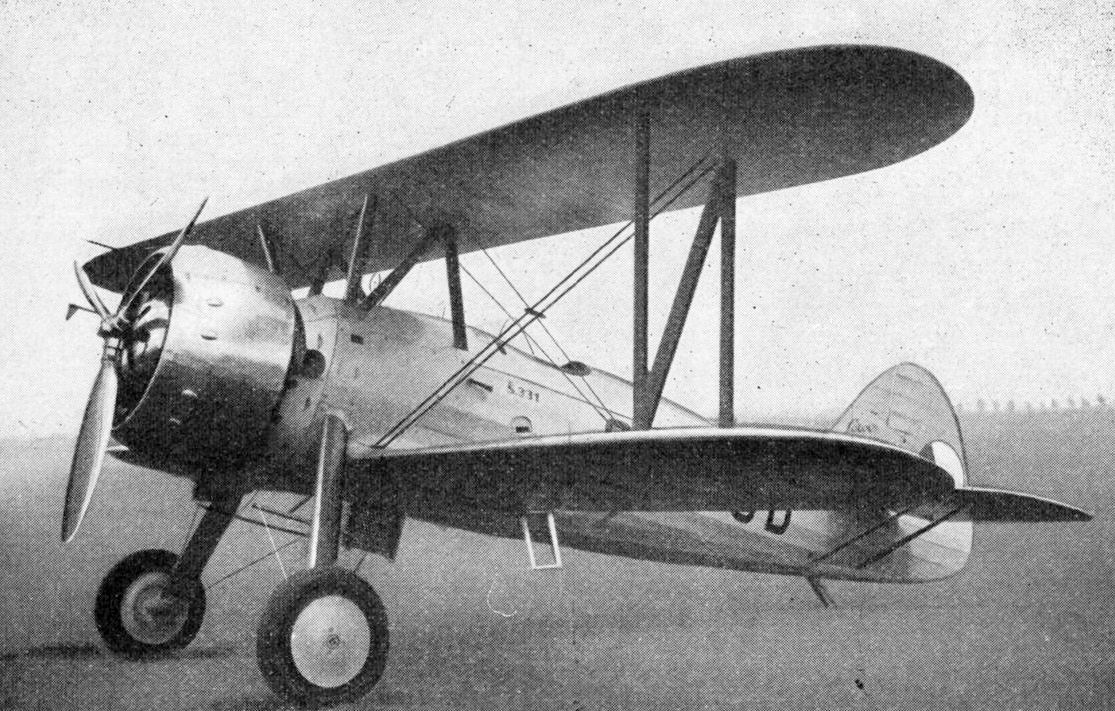
Letov Š-331 photo from Le Pontential Aérien Mondial 1936

The Letov Š-31 was a fighter aircraft produced in Czechoslovakia in the early 1930s in a number of variants. All of the aircraft had metal tubular framing and fabric covering with a metal engine cowling.

The first flight of the definitive and highly altered Š.231 version was on March 17, 1933. After testing at the Czechoslovak flight facility at Prague-Lethany, modifications were undertaken to improve the machine's performance. It entered production the following year and began equipping Czech fighter units in June 1936. The machines however did not remain in frontline fighter status with the Czechoslovak Air Force until the German occupation of Czechoslovakia in 1939. The sole Š.331 and 22 out of 24 produced Š.231s were sold to representatives of the Spanish Republican government. Reports of their combat record in the Spanish Civil War are vague, but at least three machines survived the war and were used by victorious Nationalists. The operational performance and ultimate fate of the Š.331 is unrecorded.

While the Š.31, Š.131, Š.231, and Š.431 had engines of 480 to 680 hp, the Š.331 had a 670 kW (900 hp) Walter K.14 engine, giving it outstanding performance for an aircraft of the early 1930s.

In May 1935, the aircraft established a new Czechoslovak altitude record of 10,650 m (34,941 ft).

== Operators ==
Czechoslovakia

- Czechoslovak Air Force

Slovakia

- Slovak Air Force (1939–1945)

Spain

- Spanish Republican Air Force

Spain

- Spanish Air Force – Post civil war.

== Variants ==
- Š-31 – initial version with Walter-built Bristol Jupiter (33 built)
- Š-131 – racing version with BMW-built Pratt & Whitney Hornet (three built)
- Š-231 – main production version with Walter-built Bristol Mercury engine
- Š-331 – version with Walter K.14 engine (one built)
- Š-431 – version with Armstrong Siddeley Tiger engine (one built)

== Specifications (Š-231) ==
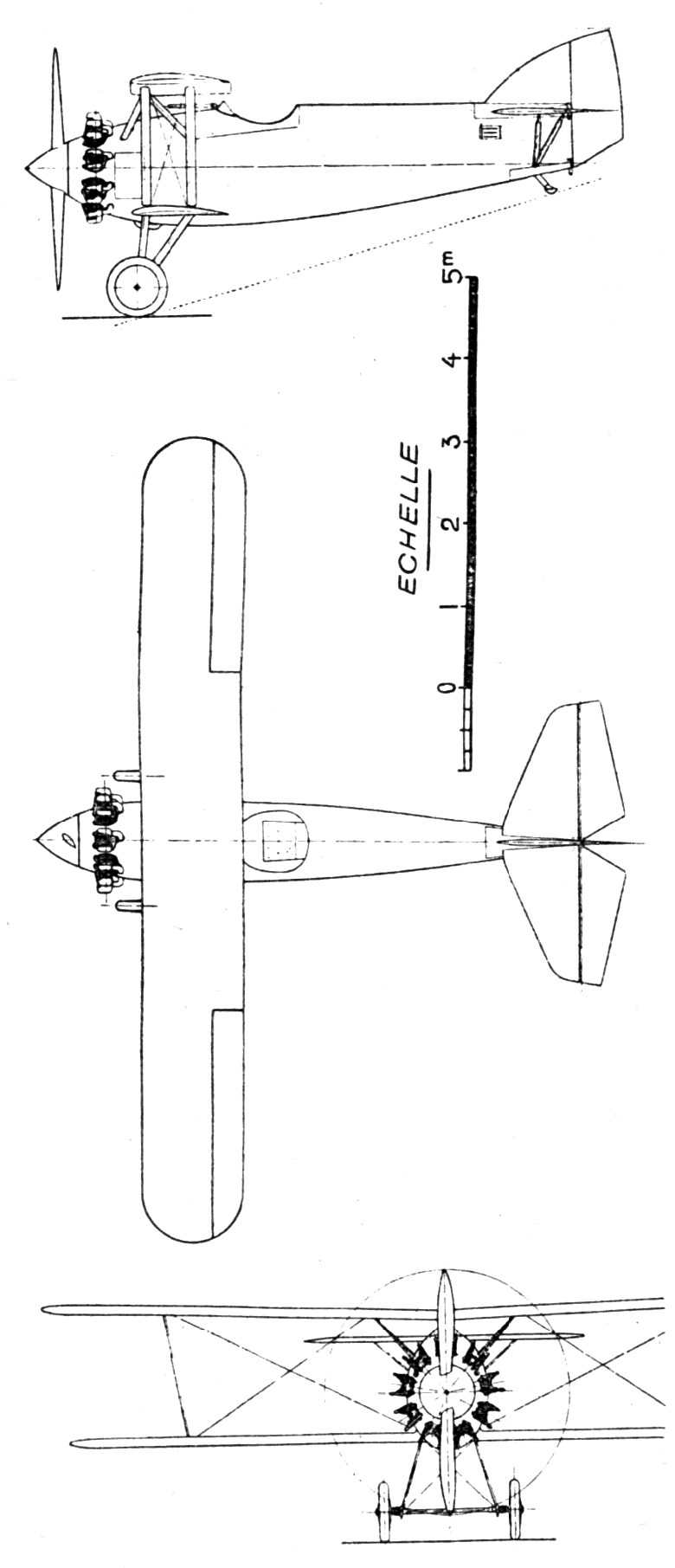
Letov Š-31 3-view drawing from L'Aérophile December,1929

Data from Tschechoslowakische Flugzeuge : von 1918 bis heute, Jane's All the World's Aircraft 1934

General characteristics

- Crew: 1
- Length: 7.85 m (25 ft 9 in)
- Wingspan: 10.06 m (33 ft 0 in)
- Height: 3 m (9 ft 10 in)
- Wing area: 21.5 m^{2} (231 sq ft)
- Empty weight: 1,243 kg (2,740 lb)
- Gross weight: 1,715 kg (3,781 lb)
- Fuel capacity: 200 L (53 US gal; 44 imp gal) main fuselage tank with a 100 L (26 US gal; 22 imp gal) centre-section gravity tank
- Powerplant: 1 × Walter Mercury V-S2 9-cylinder air-cooled radial piston engine, 412 kW (553 hp)
- Propellers: 2-bladed fixed-pitch propeller

Performance

- Maximum speed: 348 km/h (216 mph, 188 kn) at 5,000 m (16,000 ft)

300 km/h (190 mph; 160 kn) at sea level

- Cruise speed: 310 km/h (190 mph, 170 kn)
- Range: 450 km (280 mi, 240 nmi)
- Service ceiling: 9,300 m (30,500 ft) *Absolute ceiling: 9,750 m (31,990 ft)
- Time to altitude: 5,000 m (16,000 ft) in 8 minutes 13 seconds
- Wing loading: 82.5 kg/m^{2} (16.9 lb/sq ft)
- Power/mass: 0.245 kW/kg (0.149 hp/lb)

Armament

- Guns: Two fixed forward-firing 7.7 mm (0.303 inch) machine guns mounted in fuselage nose, one similar weapon in pod beneath each lower wing,
- Bombs: Six small bombs at hard points beneath lower wings

== See also ==
Related lists

- List of Interwar military aircraft
- List of aircraft of the Spanish Republican Air Force
