= Letov Š-18 =

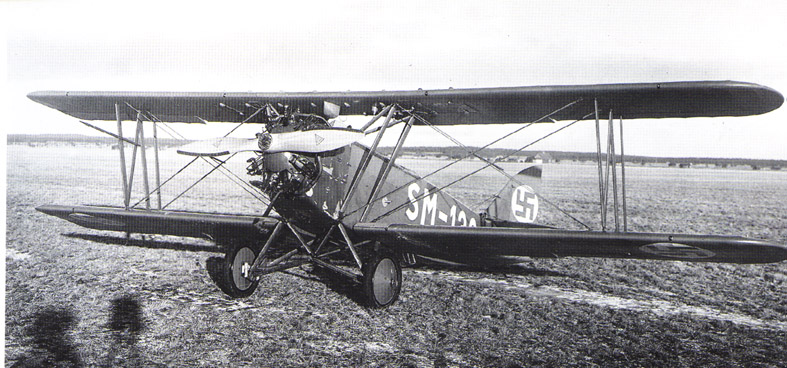

General information
- Type: Primary trainer
- Manufacturer: Letov Kbely
- Designer: Alois Šmolík
- Primary users: Czechoslovak Air Force Finnish Air Force

The Letov Š-18 was a Czechoslovak single-engined, two-seat biplane trainer. It was designed by Alois Šmolík at Letov Kbely. The Š-18 first flew in 1925.

The aircraft was quite successful and sold well, both to private pilots and to flying clubs. Apart from the basic variant, there was also still the type Š-118, which was equipped with a Walter NZ 85 engine (85 hp, 63 KW). Some machines were exported to Bulgaria. The Czechoslovak Air Force used the type 1925 to 1930 as a beginner trainer aircraft.

A complete reconstruction of the fuselage led to the Š-218, which had a steel tube frame and was equipped with a 120 hp (89 kW) Walter NZ 120 engine. The first flight of this type took place in 1926.

In 1929, one Š-218 Šmolík was presented at Helsinki International Air Show. The Finnish Air Force showed interest in the type and purchased it in March 1930. Nine more were soon ordered along with the manufacturing license. The nine aircraft ordered from Czechoslovakia arrived at Finland in June–July 1931. The Finnish State Aircraft Factory manufactured 29 slightly modified aircraft in three series. The first ten (powered by 145 hp (108 kW) Walter Mars engines) were ready in 1933, the second series of ten aircraft (powered by 162 hp (121 kW) Walter Gemma engines) were ready in 1935, and nine more (powered by 150 hp (110 kW) Bramo Sh 14) were in 1936. The Finnish version could develop a maximum speed of 155 km/h (83 knots, 96 mph). The type was in service with the Finnish Air Force as a primary trainer between 1930 - 1945. One aircraft is still preserved at the Finnish Aviation Museum in Vantaa and one replica is being built in Finland (as of 2005).

== Versions ==
- Letov Š-18 Walter NZ-60
- Letov Š-118 Walter NZ-85
- Letov Š-218 Walter NZ-120 or Bramo (Finnish production)

== Operators ==
Bulgaria

- Bulgarian Air Force

Czechoslovakia

- Czechoslovak Air Force

Finland

- Finnish Air Force 39 aircraft

== Specifications (Š-218 Šmolík) ==
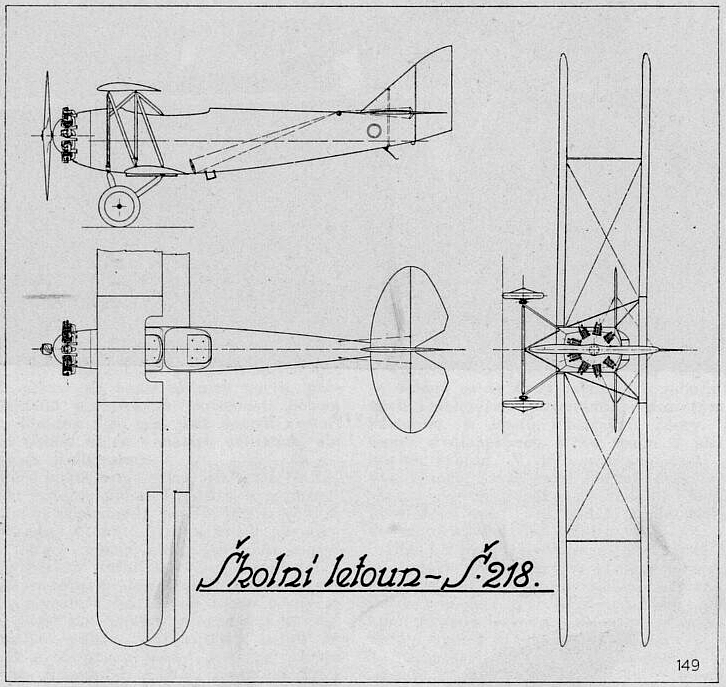
Š-218 three-view drawing

Data from Jane's all the World's Aircraft 1928

General characteristics

- Crew: 2
- Length: 6.97 m (22 ft 10 in)
- Wingspan: 10 m (32 ft 10 in)
- Height: 2.64 m (8 ft 8 in)
- Wing area: 18.64 m^{2} (200.6 sq ft)
- Empty weight: 470 kg (1,036 lb)
- Gross weight: 696 kg (1,534 lb)
- Powerplant: 1 × Walter NZ 120 nine-cylinder, air-cooled, radial piston engine, 89 kW (120 hp)
- Propellers: 2-bladed fixed pitch propeller

Performance

- Maximum speed: 160 km/h (99 mph, 86 kn)
- Cruise speed: 150 km/h (93 mph, 81 kn)
- Stall speed: 60 km/h (37 mph, 32 kn)
- Range: 375 km (233 mi, 202 nmi)
- Endurance: 2 hours
- Service ceiling: 4,000 m (13,000 ft)
- Time to altitude: 1,000 m (3,300 ft) in 5.7 minutes
- Wing loading: 33.7 kg/m^{2} (6.9 lb/sq ft)
- Power/mass: 0.1289 kW/kg (0.0784 hp/lb)

== Bibliography ==
- Anderson, Lennart (November–December 2019). "La renaissance de l'aviation militair bulgare dans les années vingt" [The Rebirth of Bulgarian Military Aviation in the Twenties]. Avions (in French). No. 232. pp. 52–66. ISSN 1243-8650.
- Listemann, Phillipe; Ritaranta, Eino (Winter 2012). "Finnish Air Force Letov S.218A". Air-Britain Aeromilitaria. Vol. 38, no. 152. pp. 181–182. ISSN 0262-8791.
