= Letov Š-33 =

General information
- Type: Long-range bomber
- National origin: Czechoslovakia
- Manufacturer: Letov
- Number built: 1

History
- First flight: 1930

The Letov Š-33 was a 1930s prototype Czechoslovak long-range bomber, designed and built by Letov.

== Development ==
Intended to meet a Czech military requirement and designed as a three-seat long-range bomber, the Š-33 first flew in 1930. The Š-33 was a cantilever mid-wing monoplane with a conventional tailskid landing gear. Powered by an 800 hp (597 kW) Isotta Fraschini engine, the Š-33 was tested but no production order was placed.

== Specifications ==
Data from

General characteristics

- Crew: three
- Wingspan: 21.70 m (71 ft 2 in)
- Max takeoff weight: 4,400 kg (9,700 lb)
- Powerplant: 1 × Isotta Fraschini piston engine, 600 kW (800 hp) built by Praga
- Propellers: 4-bladed

Performance

- Maximum speed: 270 km/h (170 mph, 150 kn)

Armament

- Guns: three machine-guns
- Bombs: up to 800Kg (1764lb)
