= Letov Š-25 =

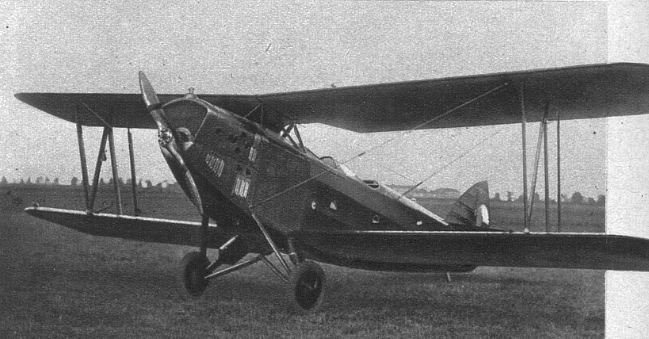

General information
- Type: Primary trainer
- Manufacturer: Letov Kbely
- Designer: Alois Šmolík
- Primary user: Czechoslovak Air Force
- Number built: 1

History
- First flight: July 1930

The Letov Š-25 was a Czechoslovak single-engined, two-seat biplane trainer. It was designed by Alois Šmolík at Letov Kbely.

== Design ==
The Š-25 was a biplane trainer with a metal frame and linen skin. It competed with the A-46 and BH-41 for the Czechoslovak Air Force contract for a new trainer aircraft. Although displaying good flight characteristics and short takeoff and landing, the Š-25 lost out to the BH-41.

== Specifications ==
Data from

General characteristics

- Crew: 2
- Length: 9.45 m (31 ft 0 in)
- Wingspan: 11.35 m (37 ft 3 in)
- Wing area: 19.80 m^{2} (213.1 sq ft)
- Empty weight: 960 kg (2,116 lb)
- Max takeoff weight: 1,180 kg (2,601 lb)
- Powerplant: 1 × Skoda HS 8Fb piston engine, 220 kW (300 hp)
- Propellers: 2-bladed fixed pitch propeller

Performance

- Maximum speed: 197 km/h (122 mph, 106 kn)
- Cruise speed: 165 km/h (103 mph, 89 kn)
- Range: 600 km (370 mi, 320 nmi)
- Service ceiling: 4,700 m (15,400 ft)
