= Letov L-101 =

L-101

General information
- Type: Airliner
- National origin: Czechoslovakia
- Manufacturer: Letov Kbely
- Status: Cancelled project

The Letov L-101 was an airliner designed in Czechoslovakia shortly after the end of the Second World War. It was to have been a 12-seat twin-engine feederliner, built using German engines left over from Czechoslovakia's occupation. The Letov factory was nationalised on 24 October 1945, and the L-101 was its first project, along with finishing work on the Junkers Ju 290.

As designed, the L-101 was a conventional cantilever low-wing monoplane. The structure throughout was to be of metal, and skinned in metal except for fabric covering for the rudder and elevators. The tailwheel undercarriage was fully retractable, with the main units retracting rearwards into the engine nacelles. The flight crew of two had a flight deck separate from the passenger cabin.

However, following the Communist coup of 1948, the various Czechoslovak aircraft and automotive manufacturers were amalgamated under CZAL, and work on the L-101 project did not proceed under the new regime.

== Specifications (as designed) ==
Data from Jane's all the World's Aircraft 1947

General characteristics

- Crew: 2
- Capacity: 12 pax
- Length: 13.43 m (44 ft 1 in)
- Wingspan: 18.14 m (59 ft 6 in)
- Height: 4.17 m (13 ft 8 in)
- Wing area: 41.4 m^{2} (446 sq ft)
- Empty weight: 3,285 kg (7,242 lb)
- Gross weight: 5,250 kg (11,574 lb)
- Fuel capacity: 750 L (200 US gal; 160 imp gal) in two main fuel tanks with 2x 225 L (59 US gal; 49 imp gal) auxiliary tanks
- Powerplant: 2 × Argus As 410 inverted V-12 air-cooled piston engine, 347 kW (465 hp) each at 3100 rpm at sea level
- Propellers: 2-bladed variable-pitch airscrews

Performance

- Maximum speed: 320 km/h (200 mph, 170 kn)
- Service ceiling: 6,000 m (20,000 ft)
- Wing loading: 127 kg/m^{2} (26 lb/sq ft)
- Power/mass: 7.5 kg/kW (12.34 lb/hp)
