= Letov Š-16 =

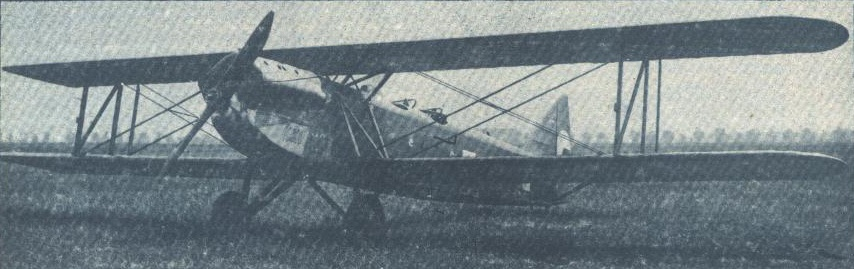
- Letov Š-116

General information
- Type: Bomber
- Manufacturer: Letov Kbely
- Designer: Šmolík
- Primary users: Czechoslovak Air Force Aviation Regiment; Turkish Air Force; Yugoslav Royal Navy
- Number built: 89

History
- First flight: 1926

The Letov Š-16 was a single-engined twin-seat biplane aircraft used in the bomber and aerial observation roles. It was designed by Alois Šmolík and produced by the Czechoslovak aircraft manufacturer Letov Kbely.

It was a broadly conventional aircraft, being largely composed of duralumin and steel while using straightforward and economic construction techniques. Its wing structure was somewhat unorthodox, having a lengthy portion of the spar that was largely unsupported, save for a form of strut bracing typically reserved for torpedo bombers. Separate models were developed for bomber and observation duties; however, there was little difference in their manufacture beyond their equipment fitout.

The Š-16 performed its maiden flight in 1926. It would be procured not only by the Czechoslovak Air Force but also by several export customers. The aircraft was produced in various models, such as the Š-16J seaplane for Yugoslavia, the Š-16L for Latvia and the Š-16T for Turkey.

== Design ==
The Letov Š-16 was a relatively conventional single-engined twin-seat biplane. While distinct variants of the aircraft were produced for the bomber and aerial observation missions, they differed in terms of equipment fitout rather than their construction, save for relatively minor alterations. Its construction made extensive use of several metals, such as duralumin for the wings and steel tubing throughout the fuselage; in contrast, the exterior was covered in doped fabric. The aircraft incorporated several novel features into its design, such as the wing structure, which made use of only a single pair of interplane struts despite a wing span of 15.5 meters. In comparison with several other techniques of metal construction, those used for the Š-16 were relatively straightforward and economic. Its construction was fairly original for the era.

The fuselage was divided into three sections; the forward portion contained the engine mounting, the middle section accommodated a pair of cockpits, and the third comprised the tail unit. The core of latter was a plain wire-based girder to which the vertical and horizontal struts were pin-jointed to the tubular longerons. Any components that were ever expected be subject to meaningful amounts of stress were not welded. The middle portion of the fuselage was partially wire-braced as well as triangulated by diagonal tubes while the front portion had sturdy bulkheads instead of the tubular members found elsewhere. These bulkheads used box section construction and were lightened via numerous holes drilled into them. One of these bulkheads functioned as a firewall that separated the engine from the middle section, which contained the primarily fuel tank, which was covered with rubber as protection against small arms fire. A service tank was also present in the centre of the top plane; when combined with the primary fuel tank, the aircraft could fly for up to five and a half hours at full power.

The unsupported portion of the spar was somewhat alleviated by a manner of strut bracing more typically found on torpedo bombers. The wing had a relatively narrow chord and a high aspect ratio of 0.52. The wing structure, which was composed of duralumin, was centred around the primary spars; these had a plane box-type design that eased manufacture but did not achieve a comparable strength-to-weight ratio to several competing aircraft even upon its introduction. All of the main fittings were made of steel, including the lugs that attached the spars to the fuselage and to the outer spars. Trough section ribs, which had outwards facing edges, were used; in places, the upper and lower flanges of these ribs were braced only by vertical distance pieces.

== Variants ==
Š-16
Two-seat bomber, reconnaissance biplane.
Š-16J
Seaplane version for Yugoslavia. One built.
Š-16L
Export version for Latvia.
Š-16T
Export version for Turkey.
Š-116
Long range reconnaissance aircraft with 500 hp (370 kW) Skoda L engine. Three built.
Š-216
Bomber powered by Walter-built 480 hp (360 kW) Bristol Jupiter engine. One built, later converted to Š-316.
Š-316
version with Hispano-Suiza 12N engine
Š-416
version with Breitfeld-Danek BD-500 engine
Š-516
version with Isotta-Fraschini Asso 750 engine
Š-616
version with Hispano-Suiza 12Nbr engine
Š-716
version with Skoda L engine
Š-816
version with Praga ESV engine
Š-916
version with Lorraine-Dietrich engine
Š-17
third prototype Š-16 with a 500 hp (370 kW) Breitfeld-Danek (Praga) engine

== Operators ==
Czechoslovakia

- Czechoslovak Air Force (115 aircraft)

Latvia

- Aviation Regiment (21 aircraft)

Turkey

- Turkish Air Force (16 aircraft)

Yugoslavia

- Yugoslav Royal Navy (one aircraft)

== Specifications (Š-16) ==

Data from Monografie: Letov Š-16

General characteristics

- Crew: 2
- Length: 10.22 m (33 ft 6 in)
- Wingspan: 15.30 m (50 ft 2 in)
- Height: 3.23 m (10 ft 7 in)
- Wing area: 46.40 m^{2} (499.4 sq ft)
- Empty weight: 1,400 kg (3,086 lb)
- Gross weight: 2,450 kg (5,401 lb)
- Powerplant: 1 × Lorraine-Dietrich 12Cc liquid-cooled W12 engine, 330 kW (440 hp)
- Propellers: 2-bladed wooden fixed-pitch

Performance

- Maximum speed: 230 km/h (140 mph, 120 kn) at ground level
- Cruise speed: 190 km/h (120 mph, 100 kn)
- Endurance: 5.5 hr
- Service ceiling: 6,500 m (21,300 ft)
- Time to altitude: 33 min to 5,000 m (16,000 ft)

Armament

- Guns: 1 x fixed, forward-firing, 7.7 mm (0.303 in) ZB vz.09 machine-gun in the forward fuselage; 2x 7.7 mm (0.303 in) Lewis guns on a flexible mount in the rear cockpit
- Bombs: 3 × 200 kg (440 lb) bombs under fuselage, 12 × 20 kg (44 lb) under wings

== See also ==
Related lists

- List of Interwar military aircraft
