= Letov Š-20 =

Š-20 and Š-21
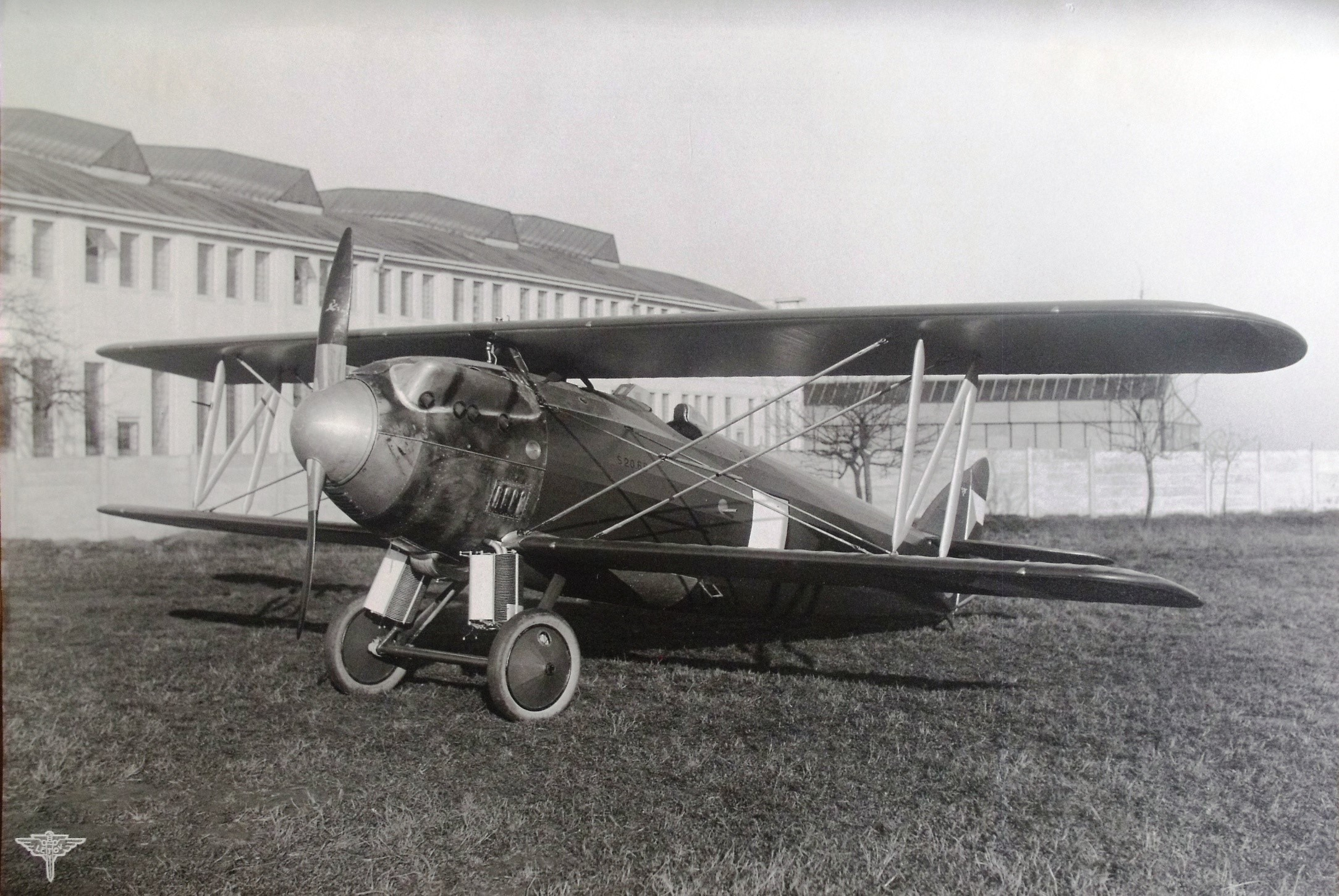
- Š-20

General information
- Type: Fighter
- National origin: Czechoslovakia
- Manufacturer: Letov
- Number built: c. 118

History
- First flight: 1925

The Letov Š-20 was a fighter aircraft produced in Czechoslovakia during the 1920s.

== Design and development ==
The Letov Š-20 was a conventional, single-bay biplane with unstaggered wings, braced by N-struts. In overall appearance, it greatly resembled contemporary SPAD fighters. The fuselage and empennage were of welded steel tube construction and covered in fabric. The wings had a tubular metal spar but were otherwise wooden, and also fabric-covered.

The Czechoslovak Air Force bought 105 machines, and ten examples were produced for Lithuania under the designation Š-20L. These remained in service until 1936 and 1935 respectively.

== Operational history ==
An Š-20 placed second in the single-engine category of the national President of the Republic air race in 1925, but fared better the following year. In the 1926 race, an Š-20 not only won this category, but also set a new national airspeed record of 234 km/h (146 mph). This record was short-lived, however, since the prize for the fastest circuit was also won in an Š-20, and this raised the record to 245 km/h (153 mph).

A single prototype of an unarmed advanced trainer version was built as the Š-21, but this did not sell.

== Variants ==
- Š-20 – initial production version
  - Š-20M – revised version with slimmed down rear fuselage (main production version for Czechoslovakia)
  - Š-20L – export version for Lithuania (eight built)

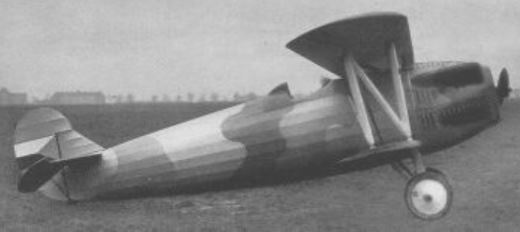
A side view of the Š-21 prototype

  - Š-20R – version with further revisions to fuselage (one built)
  - Š-20J – version with Walter-built Bristol Jupiter engine
- Š-21 – trainer version with Hispano-Suiza 8Aa engine (one built)

== Specifications (Š-20) ==
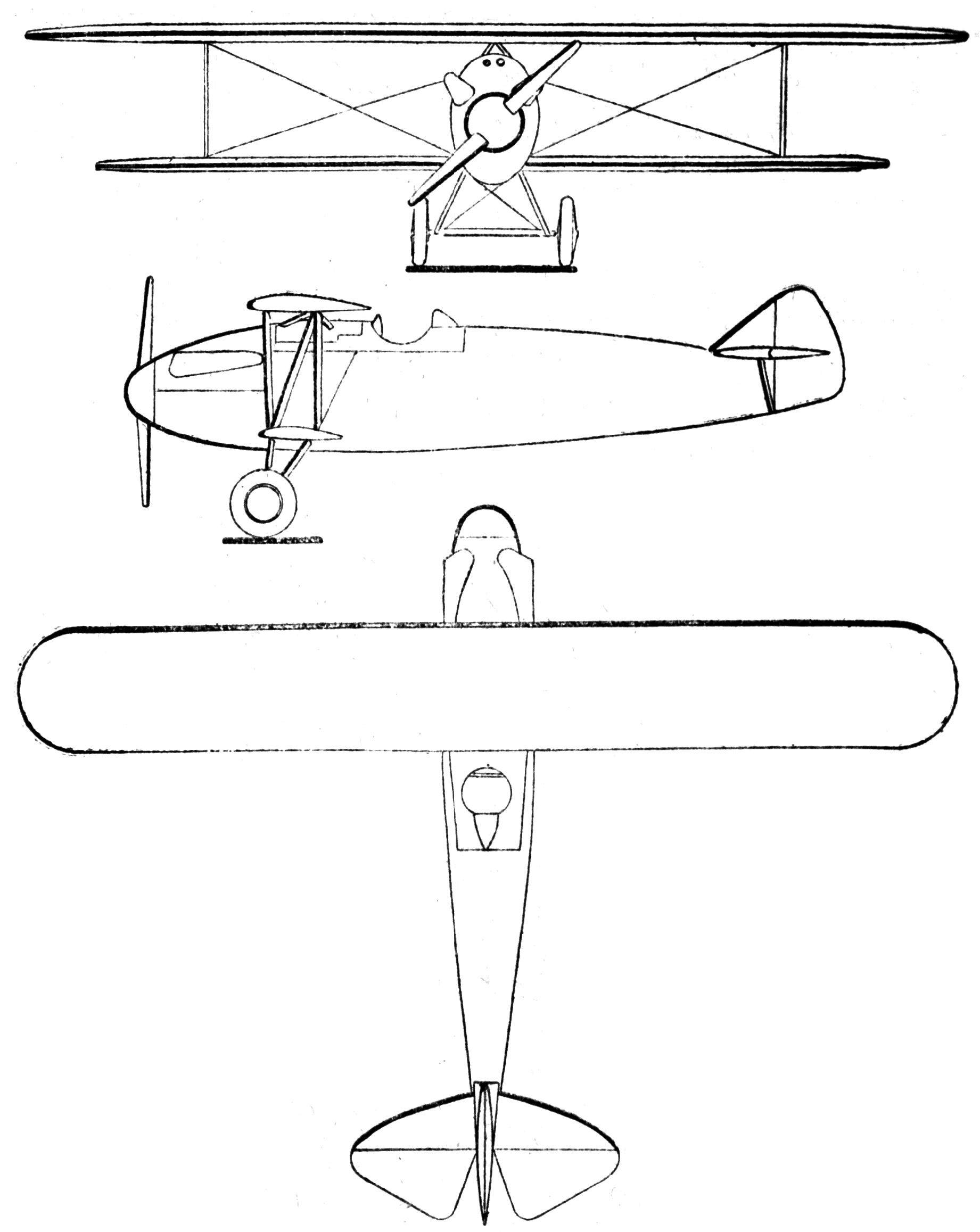
Letov S-20 3-view drawing from Les Ailes January 13, 1927

Data from Jane's all the World's Aircraft 1928

General characteristics

- Crew: 1
- Length: 7.44 m (24 ft 5 in)
- Wingspan: 9.6 m (31 ft 6 in)
- Height: 2.56 m (8 ft 5 in)
- Wing area: 18.4 m^{2} (198 sq ft)
- Empty weight: 740 kg (1,631 lb)
- Gross weight: 1,050 kg (2,315 lb)
- Powerplant: 1 × Škoda-built Hispano-Suiza 8Fb V-8 water-cooled piston engine, 221 kW (296 hp)
- Propellers: 2-bladed wooden fixed-pitch propeller

Performance

- Maximum speed: 257.5 km/h (160.0 mph, 139.0 kn)
- Range: 528 km (328 mi, 285 nmi)
- Endurance: 2 hours 10 minutes
- Service ceiling: 7,250 m (23,790 ft)
- Rate of climb: 6 m/s (1,200 ft/min)
- Time to altitude: 5,000 m (16,000 ft) in 13 minutes 40 seconds
- Wing loading: 57 kg/m^{2} (12 lb/sq ft)
- Power/mass: 0.2163 kW/kg (0.1316 hp/lb)

Armament

- Guns: 2x fixed, forward-firing, synchronised 7.7 mm (0.303 in) Vickers machine-guns (ZB vz.09) in the forward fuselage upper decking

== See also ==
Related lists

- List of Interwar military aircraft
