= Letov Š-1 =

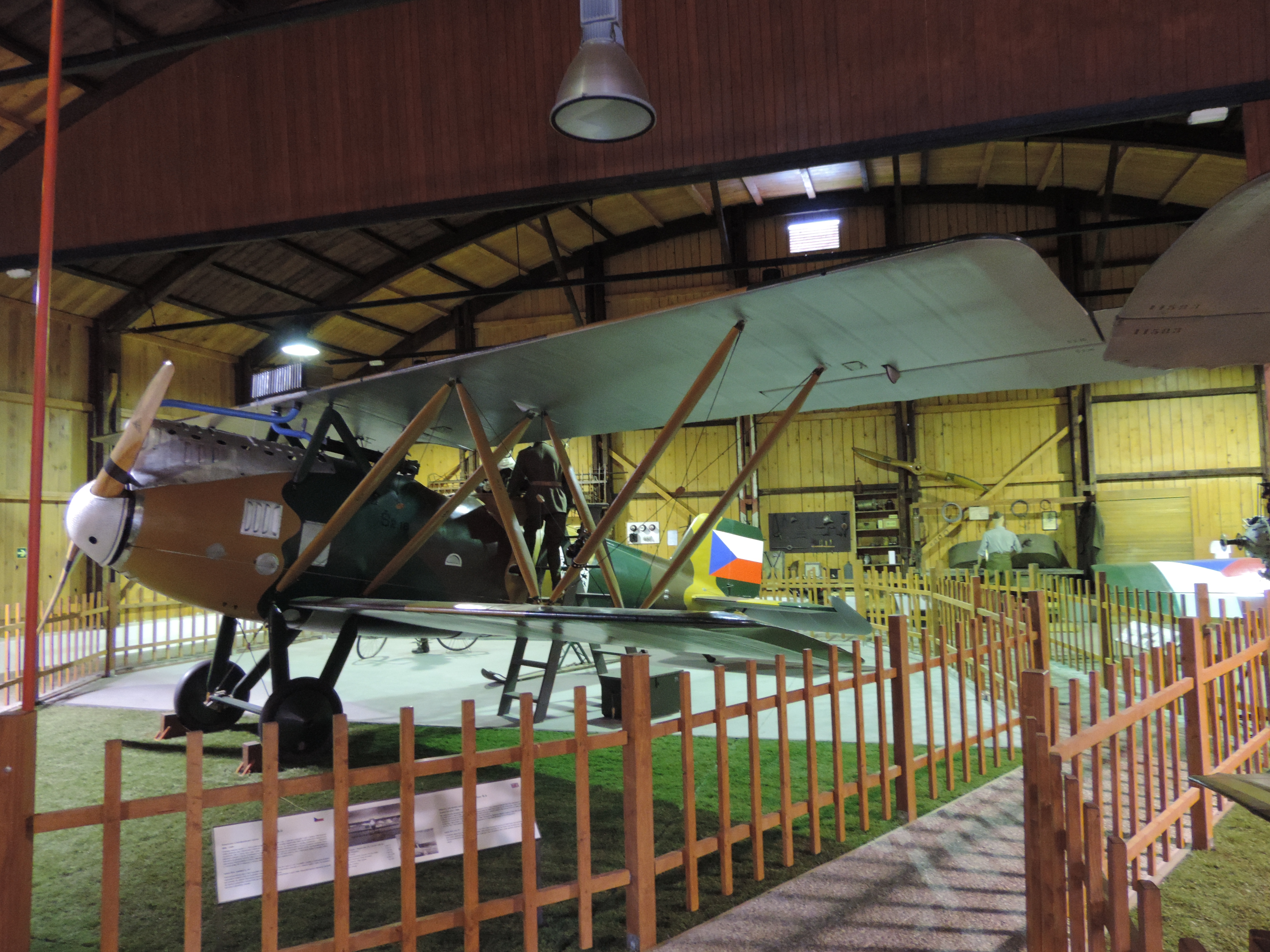
- A Letov Š-2 (re-engined Š-1) at the Kbely museum

General information
- Type: Surveillance
- Manufacturer: Letov Kbely
- Designer: Alois Šmolík
- Primary user: Czechoslovak Air Force
- Number built: 28 Š-1, 64 Š-2

History
- First flight: 1920

The Letov Š-1 was a Czechoslovak single-engined, two-seat biplane surveillance aircraft. It was the first military aircraft built in Czechoslovakia. It was designed by Alois Šmolík at Letov Kbely. The Š-1 first flew in 1920.

== Variants ==
SH-1
127 kW (170 hp) Hiero L engines. Later redesignated Š-1. 28 built.
SM-1
194 kW (260 hp) Maybach Mb.IVa engines. Later redesignated Š-2. 64 built.
Sm A 1
Commercial variant. Canopy over rear cockpit for two passengers.

== Specifications (Š-1) ==
Data from The Encyclopedia of World Aircraft

General characteristics

- Crew: 2
- Length: 8.3 m (27 ft 3 in)
- Wingspan: 13.23 m (43 ft 5 in)
- Height: 3.1 m (10 ft 2 in)
- Empty weight: 861 kg (1,898 lb)
- Max takeoff weight: 1,375 kg (3,031 lb)
- Powerplant: 1 × Hiero L 6-cylinder water-cooledin-line piston engine, 169 kW (227 hp)
- Propellers: 2-bladed fixed-pitch propeller

Performance

- Maximum speed: 194 km/h (121 mph, 105 kn)
- Range: 715 km (444 mi, 386 nmi)
- Service ceiling: 6,000 m (20,000 ft)

Armament
