= Letov Š-4 =

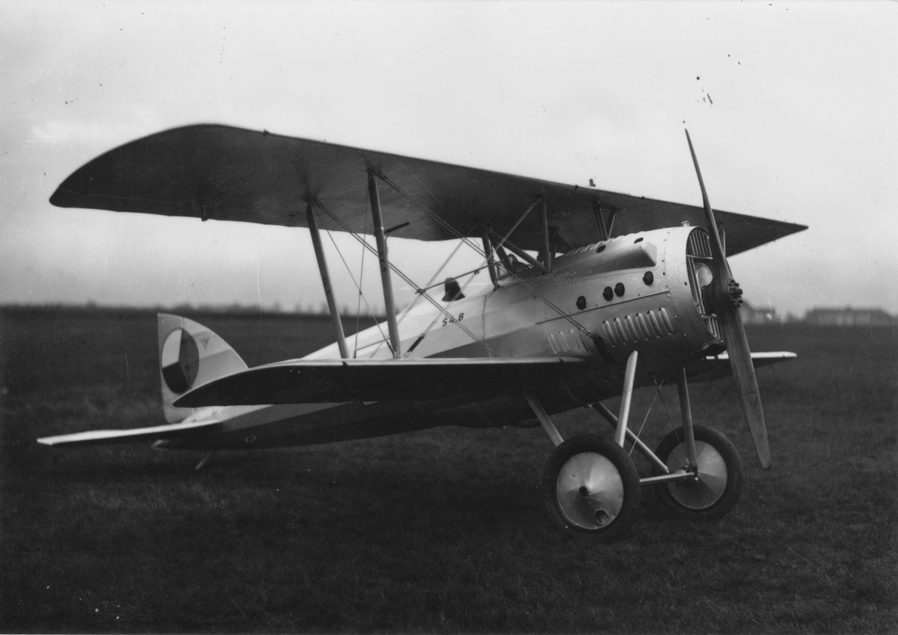

General information
- Type: Fighter
- Manufacturer: Letov Kbely
- Primary user: Czechoslovak Air Force
- Number built: 20

History
- Introduction date: 1923
- First flight: 1922
- Retired: 1928

The Letov Š-4 was a Czechoslovak single-bay, unstaggered biplane fighter and trainer in the 1920s.

== Production history ==
The Š-4 was first created in 1922 as an intended successor to the SPAD S.VII and S.XIII, in service with the newly created Czechoslovak Air Force. It first flew in 1922, with fabric-covered wooden wings and a metal fuselage and tail.

== Operational history ==
The Czechoslovak Air Force ordered 20 Š-4s in 1922 and these were delivered in early 1923. The plane lived out the 1920s as a fighter and trainer, but by 1927 difficulties were being experienced due to the low manufacturing quality of the Š-4. As a result, all remaining Š-4s were upgraded to Š-4a trainer aircraft in 1928.

== List of operators ==
Czech Republic

- Czechoslovak Air Force

== Specifications ==
Data from Jane's all the World's Aircraft 1924

General characteristics

- Crew: 1
- Length: 6.58 m (21 ft 7 in)
- Wingspan: 8 m (26 ft 3 in)
- Height: 2.62 m (8 ft 7 in)
- Wing area: 15.9 m^{2} (171 sq ft)
- Empty weight: 673 kg (1,484 lb)
- Gross weight: 980 kg (2,161 lb)
- Powerplant: × Hispano-Suiza 8Ba V-8 water-cooled piston engine, 160 kW (220 hp)
- Propellers: 2-bladed wooden fixed pitch propeller

Performance

- Maximum speed: 232 km/h (144 mph, 125 kn)
- Service ceiling: 6,200 m (20,300 ft)
- Time to altitude: 3,000 m (9,800 ft) in 9.3 minutes
- Wing loading: 61.5 kg/m^{2} (12.6 lb/sq ft)
- Power/mass: 0.16 kW/kg (0.1 hp/lb)

Armament

- Guns: 2 x synchronised 7.7 mm (0.303 in) Vickers machine-guns

== See also ==
Related lists

- List of Interwar military aircraft

== Bibliography ==
- Green, William; Swanborough, Gordon (1997). The complete book of fighters : an illustrated encyclopedia of every fighter aircraft built and flown. Surrey: Colour Library Direct. ISBN 1-85833-777-1.
