= Spinner (aeronautics) =

Aircraft component

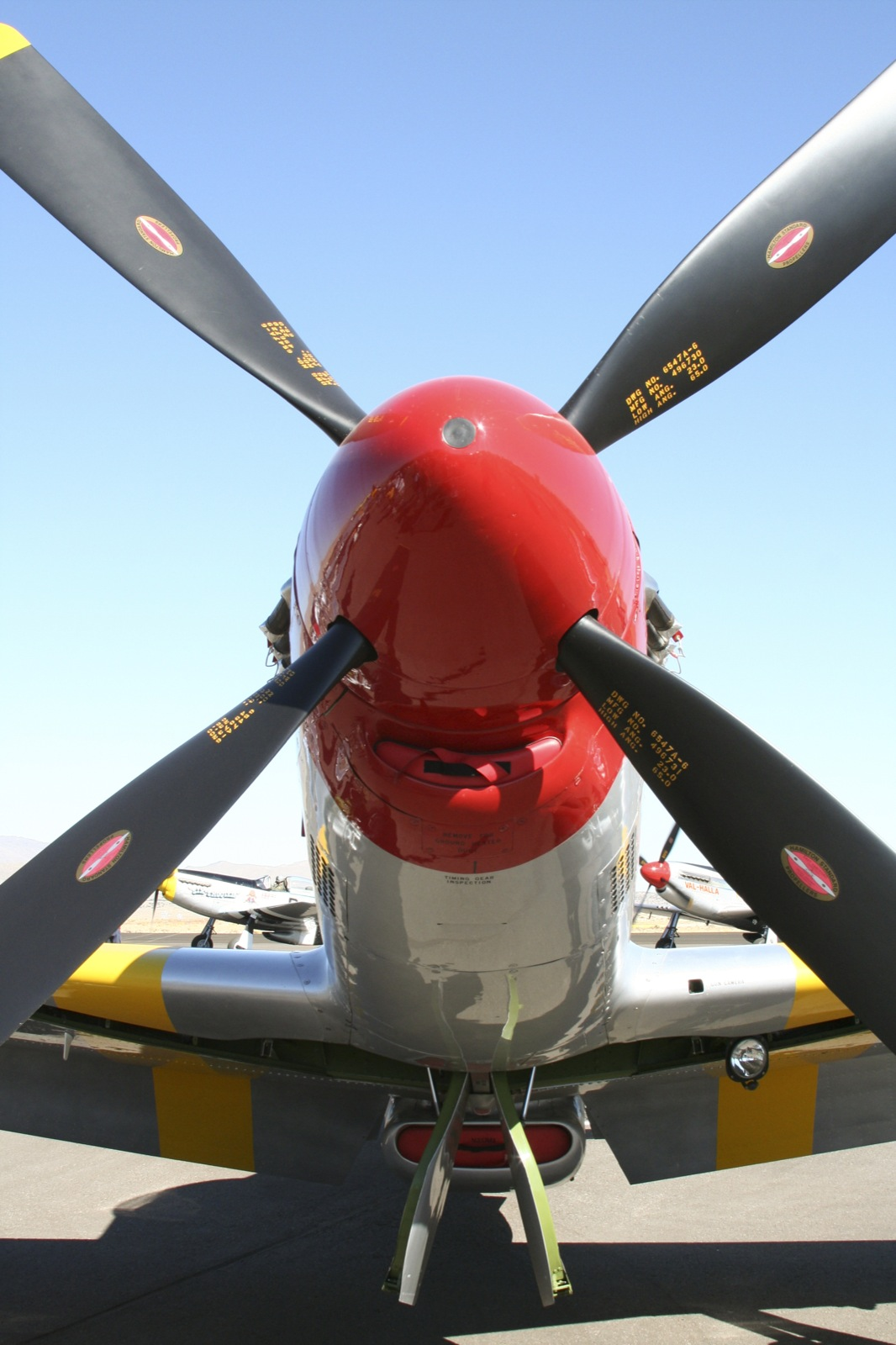
North American P-51 Mustang with a large-style spinner that fits over the propeller.

A spinner is an aircraft component, a streamlined fairing fitted over a propeller hub or at the centre of a turbofan engine. Spinners both make the aircraft overall more streamlined, thereby reducing aerodynamic drag, and also smooth the airflow so that it enters the air intakes more efficiently. Spinners also fulfill an aesthetic role on some aircraft designs.

== Piston engine spinners ==
Piston-powered aircraft often have spinners of one of two basic designs. The large spinner fits over the propeller, while the smaller skull cap style is directly attached to the propeller and just covers the propeller mounting bolts.

The spinner may be constructed from aluminium or fibreglass. Often softer grades of aluminium are used to reduce the tendency to crack in service. Early fibreglass spinners introduced as kits for the homebuilt aircraft market in the early 1990s initially developed a poor reputation for cracking. More recent models have resolved these problems and they now function as well as aluminium ones do.

The normal method of installation of a large spinner on a light aircraft involves installing a circular spinner back plate over the engine driveshaft, then the propeller, followed by a spinner front plate. The spinner dome is then mounted over this assembly and secured with screws to the back and front plates. Small plates are usually fitted behind the propeller to fill in the spinner dome cutouts and are secured to the backplate again with screws. Some spinner designs do not incorporate the front plate, although these are not suitable for higher-powered engines.

The loss of a spinner in flight has caused damage to aircraft as well as accidents. If the spinner becomes partially detached then damage to the engine cowling can result, along with a high degree of vibration that results in the need for an immediate engine shut-down and a forced landing. In cases where the spinner has completely departed the aircraft it often impacts the airframe or the windshield, with potentially catastrophic results.

Because of their role as a rotating component and the risk of cracking and failure due to engine vibration, spinners require regular inspection, particularly of the back plate as well as the spinner dome itself.

== History ==
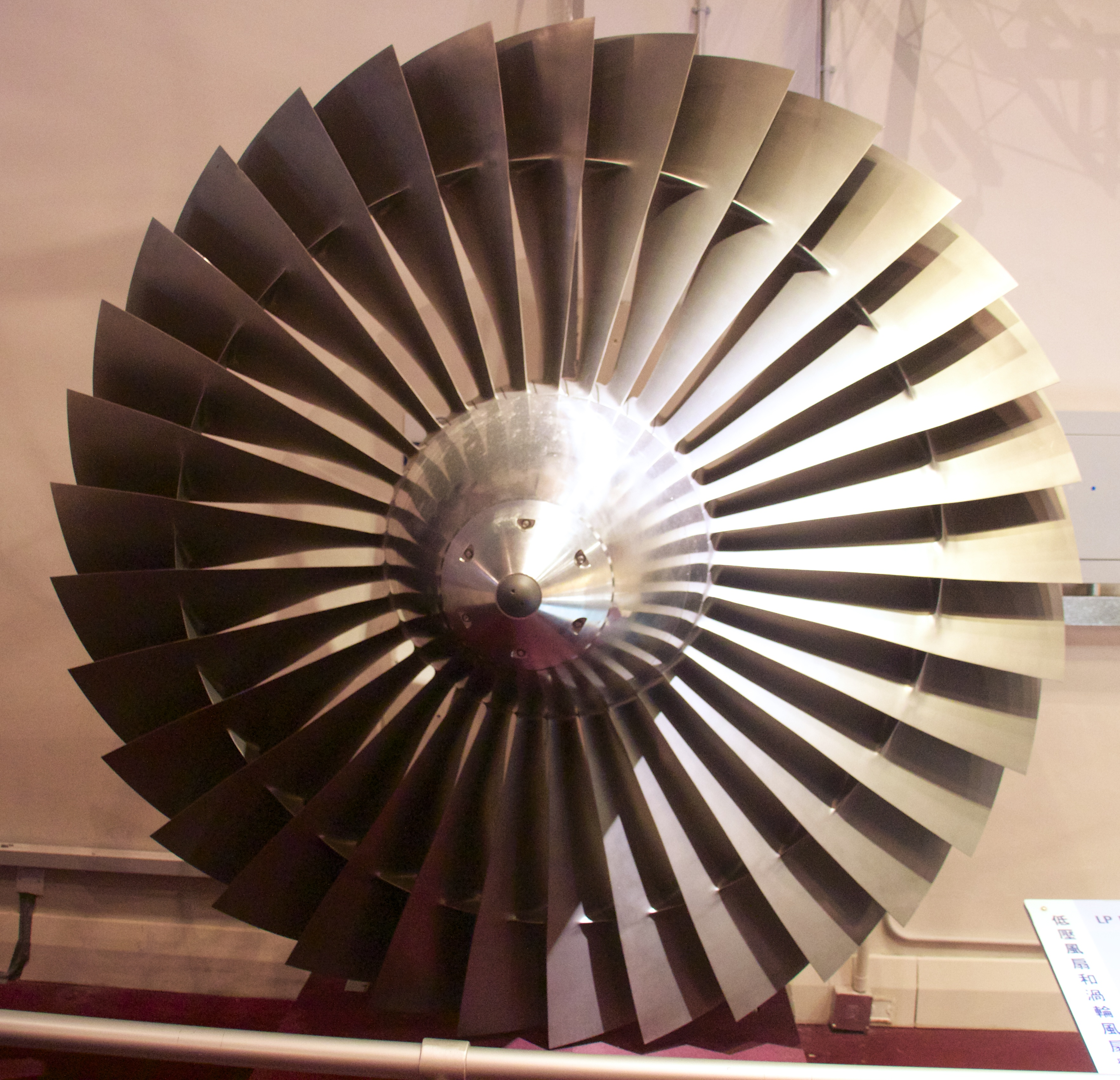
A fan from a Rolls-Royce RB211 turbofan engine, with its spinner visible at the centre of the fan blades.

The first spinners were fitted to aircraft in the early 1910s, originally to reduce drag caused by the large-diameter rotary engines of that era, and also were prominent on World War I-era aircraft, like the Morane-Saulnier N French monoplane fighter, and for the Central Powers, Robert Thelen's Albatros D.I through D.V series of fighter designs. In some cases spinners were found to block airflow to the engine, causing overheating, a problem later solved by careful aerodynamic design.
