= List of aircraft (La–Lh) =

This is a list of aircraft in alphabetical order beginning with 'La' through 'Lh'.

== La–Lh ==
=== La France ===
(Neal La France, Wichita, KS)

- La France Cadet SF

=== La Mouette ===
(Fontaine-lès-Dijon, France)

- La Mouette Atlas
- La Mouette Cosmos
- La Mouette Hermes
- La Mouette O2B
- La Mouette Profil
- La Mouette Racer
- La Mouette Revo
- La Mouette Samson
- La Mouette Skybike
- La Mouette Sphinx
- La Mouette SR 210
- La Mouette Top Model
- La Mouette Top Secret
- La Mouette Topless
- La Mouette ZR 250

=== La Porte ===
(La Porte Aircraft Co, La Porte, IN)

- La Porte 1938 Monoplane

=== LAA ===
(Laboratorio Artigiano Aeronautico)

- LAA N.3
- LAA N.3/S
- LAA N.5/R
- LAA N.5Cab
- LAA N.5AQ (AQ - Alta Quota - high altitude)

=== Labahan ===
- Labahan Hitchhiker

=== LaBiche ===
(LaBiche Aerospace)

- LaBiche FSC-1

=== Laboratoire Eiffel ===
(Laboratoire Eiffel - LE)

- LE C1

=== Labourdette-Halbronn ===
- Labourdette-Halbronn H.T.1
- Labourdette-Halbronn H.T.2

=== LACAB ===
(Les Ateliers de Constructions Aeronautiques Belges)

- LACAB T.7
- LACAB GR.8

=== Lacey ===
(Joseph L Lacey, Tulsa, OK)

- Lacey M-10
- Lacey M-10C VW Twin

=== Lachassagne ===
(Adolphe Lachassagne)

- Lachassagne AL-1
- Lachassagne Al-2
- Lachassagne AL 3
- Lachassagne AL 5
- Lachassagne AL-6
- Lachassagne AL-7

=== LACO ===
(LACO (Fdr: Joe Laven), Desert Hot Springs, CA)

- LACO 125
- LACO 145

=== Lacroix ===
(Léon Lacroix)

- Lacroix 2L.XVI

=== Lacroix-Bourdin ===
(Léon Lacroix & Raymond Bourdin)

- Lacroix-Bourdin 2LB.7
- Lacroix-Bourdin 2LB.9

=== Lacroix-Nazaris ===
(Léon Lacroix & Barret de Nazaris)

- Lacroix-Nazaris LN-1
- Lacroix-Nazaris LN-2
- Lacroix-Nazaris LN-3

=== Lacroix-Nazaris-Bourdin ===
(Léon Lacroix, Barret de Nazaris & Raymond Bourdin)

- Lacroix-Nazaris-Bourdin LNB-12

=== Lacroix-Trussant ===
(Léon Lacroix et Gérard Trussant)

- Lacroix-Trussant LT.51 Microplan

=== Lada Land ===
- Lada Land VM-01

=== Ladd ===
(Robert Ladd )

- Ladd Taylor Chihuahua

=== Ladougne ===
(Emile Ladougne)

- Ladougne La Colombe

=== LAE ===
(LAE Helicopters Cyprus)

- LAE Ultrasport 496T

=== L.A.F. ===
(Ligue Aéronautique Française)

- L.A.F. Desmon flying boat

=== Lafay ===
(Louis Etienne Lafay, Brazil)

- Lafay Rio de Janeiro
- Lafay Independência

=== Lafayette ===
(Lafayette Aircraft Works, 230 W Washington Blvd, Los Angeles, CA)

- Lafayette T

=== Laflamme Helicopters ===
- Laflamme Helicopters LAF-01

=== Lage ===
(Lage (aircraft constructor))

- Lage 1946 aeroplane

=== Laird ===
(E M Laird Company, 244 South Wichita Street (Wichita) Kansas / E M Laird Airplane Co, 4500 W 83 St (Ashburn Field) Chicago, IL)

- Laird 1912 Monoplane
- Laird#2 1913 Baby Biplane
- Laird 1915 Biplane
- Laird B-3
- Laird B-4
- Laird C-6 Special
- Laird Commercial
- Laird Derby Racer
- Laird LC-1B
- Laird LC-AA Commercial
- Laird LC-B
- Laird LC-R Commercial
- Laird LC-B200
- Laird LC-1B200 Commercial
- Laird LC-B300
- Laird LC-1B285
- Laird LC-1B300 Commercial
- Laird LC-DC Speedwing Junior
- Laird LC-DE Speedwing Junior
- Laird LC-DW Solution
- Laird LC-DW300 Super Solution
- Laird LC-DW500 Super Solution
- Laird LC-EW450 Sesquiwing
- Laird LC-R200 Speedwing
- Laird LC-R300 Speedwing
- Laird LC-RW300 Speedwing
- Laird LC-RW450 Speedwing
- Laird Limousine
- Laird S Sportplane
- Laird Standardwing
- Laird Swallow
- Laird Twin
- Laird-Turner Meteor LTR-14
- Laird-Turner Special

=== Laird Aircraft Corporation ===
(471 W. First St., Wichita, Ks.)

- Laird Whippoorwill

=== Laird ===
(Charles L Laird, Wichita, KS, 1930: Aircraft Engineering, Chicago, IL)

- Laird Pierce Arrow
- Laird Special

=== Laister ===
- Laister LP-15 Nugget
- Laister LP-49
- Laister-Kauffman TG-4

=== LAK ===
(Lietuviškos aviacinės konstrukcijos)

- LAK Genesis 2
- LAK-9
- LAK-12
- LAK-16
- LAK-17
- LAK-19
- LAK-20

=== Lake ===
(Dan Lake, Lake City, KS )

- Lake C-1

=== Lake ===
(Lake Aircraft Corp (pres: Jack Strayer), Sanford, ME)

- Lake LA-4
- Lake LA-4-200 Buccaneer
- Lake LA-4-250 Renegade
- Lake Renegade
- Lake LA-250 Seawolf
- Lake LA-270 Seafury
- Lake LA-270T Turbo Seafury
- Lake LA-270 Turbo Renegade
- Lake Seaplane

=== Lakes ===
- Lakes Hydro-monoplane
- Lakes Sea Bird
- Lakes Water Bird
- Lakes Water Hen

=== Lam ===
(Larry Lam )

- Lam Wanderer

=== Lambach ===
(J.W.H. (Hugo) Lambach) see:DSA

- Lambach HL.I
- Lambach HL.II

=== Lambert ===
(Lambert Aircraft Engineering BVBA)

- Lambert Mission 106
- Lambert Mission 108
- Lambert Mission 212
- Lambert Mission 212-100
- Lambert Mission 212-200
- Lambert Mission 212-300
- Lambert Mission 212-400
- Lambert Mission 216

=== Lambert ===
(Monocoupe Div, (S L "Casey") Lambert Aircraft Corporation, St Louis, MO and Long Island, NY)

- Lambert D Box Full
- Lambert G
- Lambert H
- Lambert Monocoach
- Lambert Twin Monocoach

=== Lamco ===
(Danex Engineering Kft)

- Lamco Eurocub

=== Lammer Geyer Aviation ===
- Lammer Geyer Jupiter

=== Lampich ===
(Arpad Lampich)

- Lampich L-1 Mama Kedvence (Mummy's Darling)
- Lampich L-2 Róma (Rome)
- Lampich L-4 Bohóc (Clown)
- Lampich BL-6
- Lampich BL-7
- Lampich L-9 Veréb (85 hp)
- Lampich L-9 II (Spatz) (85 hp)
- Lampich L-16
- Lampich D-20 Pajtás (Rogue)
- NL XXI (95 hp)
- NL XXII (150 hp)

=== Lamson ===
(Merger of Central Aircraft (crop spraying) & Robert T Lamson Aircraft Co, Yakima, WA)

- Lamson Air Tractor

=== Lancair ===
(Neico Aviation Inc (Fdr: Lance A Niebauer), Redmond, OR)

- Lancair IV
- Lancair IV-P
- Lancair Columbia 300
- Lancair Legacy
- Lancair Propjet
- Lancair 200
- Lancair 235
- Lancair 320
- Lancair 360
- Lancair ES
- Lancair Sentry
- Lancair Super ES
- Lancair Tigress
- Lancair Barracuda
- Lancair Mako

=== Lancashire ===
(Lancashire Aircraft Company)

- Lancashire Prospector

=== Landgraf ===
((Fred) Landgraf Helicopter Co, 135 St at Central Ave, Los Angeles, CA)

- Landgraf H-2
- Landgraf H-3
- Landgraf H-4

=== Landis & Earle ===
((George L) Landis & Earle (Blodgett), 4633 Cramer St, Milwaukee, WI)

- Landis & Earle 101

=== Landray ===
(Etienne-Claude Landray and Gilbert Landray)

- Landray GL.01
- Landray GL.02 Ami Pou
- Landray GL.03 Pouss Pou
- Landray GL.04 Visa Pou (ULM)
- Landray GL.05 (ULM)
- Landray GL.06 Papillon (ULM)
- Landray GL.07 Galopin (Etienne Landray and Philippe-Claude Massé)
- Landray-Massè LM01 Galopin Bis
- Landray JPM 3 Loiret

=== Lane Automatous Air-Ship Co Lane ===
(Lane Automatous Air-Ship Co, San Francisco, CA)

- Lane 1908 Helicopter

=== Lang ===
(Frank Lang, Lockport, IL)

- Lang Sport

=== Langdon ===
(Jesse E Langdon, Bell, CA)

- Langdon 1929 Helicopter

=== Lange ===
- Lange Antares

=== Lange-Billard ===
- Lange-Billard 1910 Triangular Wing

=== Langhurst ===
(Louis F Langhurst, Carriere, MI)

- Langhurst Stuka

=== Langley ===
(Dr Samuel P Langley, Washington, DC)

- Langley Aerodrome
- Langley Monoplane

=== Langley ===
(Langley Aircraft Corp (pres: Caleb S Bragg), Port Washington, NY)

- Langley Twin
- Langley NL
- Langley 29-65
- Langley 29-90
- Langley 2-4-90

=== Langlois ===
(Jacques Langlois)

- Langlois JL.2

=== Lanier ===
(Edward H Lanier and son (Edward M), Miami and Jacksonville, FL, Covington, KY, 1943: (E M) Lanier Aircraft Corp, Marlton, NJ)

- Lanier 110 Paraplane Commuter PL-8
- Lanier 120 Paraplane I
- Lanier Paraplane II
- Lanier 443 Paraplane
- Lanier Vacuplane
  - Lanier XL-1
  - Lanier XL-2
  - Lanier XL-3
  - Lanier XL-4
  - Lanier LVF (a.k.a. XL-5)

=== Lanitz Aviation ===
(Leipzig, Germany)

- Lanitz Escapade One
- Lanitz Escapade Two
- Lanitz Sherwood Ranger

=== Lansing ===
(C R Lansing, Warren, OH)

- Lansing 1931 Monoplane

=== Lansing ===
(Orville G Barnum and Lansing (Ed) Ratelle, Portland, OR)

- Lansing 1T

=== Lantres-Bouffort ===
(Gérard Lantres & Bouffort) (see also:Bouffort-Lantres)

- Lantres-Bouffort LB.20 Elytroplan

=== Lanzius ===
(Lanzius Aircraft Co, New York, NY)

- Lanzius L I Variable Speed Aeroplane (1917)
- Lanzius L II
- Lanzius Variable Speed Aeroplane (1918)

=== LAPAN ===
(Lembaga Penerbangan dan Antariksa Nasional - National Institute of Aeronautics and Space, Indonesia)

- LAPAN XT-400

=== Lardin ===
(Arthur Lardin, W A McCurdy, E Smith, New Castle, DE)

- Lardin AL-1

=== Lark ===
(Lark Aircraft Co (Pres: Romer G Weyant), 217 E Lincoln, Wichita, KS)

- Lark 1927 Biplane

=== Larkin ===
((W Keith) Larkin Aircraft Corp, Watsonville, CA)

- Larkin KC-3 Skylark

=== Laranudi ===
- Larnaudi twin-engined flying boat
- Larnaudi single-engined flying boat

=== Laron ===
(Laron Aviation Tech, Borger, TX)

- Laron Wizard

=== Laros ===
(OKB Laros)

- Laros-100

=== Larrieu ===
(Jean Larrieu)

- Larrieu JL.2

=== Larsen ===
(Carl Ludvig Larsen)

- Larsen LN-11
- Larsen Special II

=== Larsen ===
(Herman Larsen, Keasbey, NJ)

- Larsen 2-C

=== Larson ===
(Merle Larson & Paul Holmes, Larson Aero Development, Concord, CA)

- Larson D-1 Agricultural Biplane
- Larson F-12 Baby
- Larson Helicopter
- Larson Speed Bird
- Larson-Holmes B
- Larson-Holmes Illusion (B)

=== Las Brisas ===
(Las Brisas Sales, Ozark, MO)

- Las Brisas Mohawk

=== Lasalle ===
(LaSalle Aircraft Co (Pres: Claude C. Flagg), 111 Maple St, Joliet, IL, c. 1928-1933: Ottawa, IL)

- LaSalle F-2
- LaSalle Model A Coupe

=== Lasco ===
(Larkin Aircraft Supply Company Ltd, Coode Island, Melbourne)

- Lasco Lascondor
- Lasco Lascoter
- Lasco Lascowl

=== Lascurain ===
( Ing. Ángel de Lascurain y Osio)

- Lascurain Toloche
- Lascurain Sport
- Lascurain Aura
- Lascurain-Salinas XB1
- Lascurain Quetzatcoatl

=== Laser ===
(Laser Aerobatics)

- Laser Aerobatics Akro Model Z

=== Lasher ===
(C W Lasher, Winter Springs, FL)

- Lasher Renegade 1
- Lasher Little Thumper

=== Lasley ===
((John A) Lasley Tool & Machine Co, Beloit, MI)

- Lasley Sport

=== Lasserre ===
(G. Lasserre - aka SO G.L.3 Libellule)

- Lasserre G.L.3 Libellule

=== Latécoère ===
(Société Industrielle d'Aviation Latécoère [SIDAL or SILAT] from 1922) (now Groupe Latécoère)

- Latécoère 1 C2 two-seat single-engine fighter project; designation may have also been used for license-built Breguet 14s
- Latécoère 2 Salmson 2s produced under license after WWI
- Latécoère 3
- Latécoère 4
- Latécoère 5
- Latécoère 6
- Latécoère 7 monoplane bomber project
- Latécoère 8
- Latécoère 9
- Latécoère 10
- Latécoère 11
- Latécoère 12
- Latécoère 13
- Latécoère XIV high-wing cantilever monoplane transport; not related to later 1924 design
- Latécoère 14
- Latécoère 15
- Latécoère 15H
- Latécoère 16
- Latécoère 17
- Latécoère 18 twin-engine light transport biplane
- Latécoère 19
- Latécoère 20 ambulance version of Latécoère 19
- Latécoère 21
- Latécoère 22
- Latécoère 23
- Latécoère 24
- Latécoère 25
- Latécoère 26
- Latécoère 27
- Latécoère 28
- Latécoère 29
- Latécoère 30
- Latécoère 32
- 100-102 and 110: missiles, drone targets
- Latécoère 101 four-engine push-pull flying boat
  - Latécoère 120-123: derivatives of the 101; 120 reused for drone/missile
- Latécoère 124 101 with four single engines
- Latécoère 130-134: derivatives of the 631; some coupled engines and shaft-driven propellers
- Latécoère 140-141: four-engine airliner with 631 wing
- Latécoère 150-153: four-engine flying boats
- Latécoère 160 four-engine airliner with 631 wing; derivative of the Latécoère 150
- Latécoère 170 six-engine reconnaissance flying boat
- Latécoère 180-185: eight-engine developments of 170
- Latécoère 210 six-engine airliner
- Latécoère 221-228: ASW aircraft projects; various engine concepts
- Latécoère 225 (1948) four-engine bomber project
- Latécoère 225
- Latécoère 231 Malafon missile
- Latécoère 255 pulse jet fighter project
- Latécoère 257 ASW missile project
- Latécoère 270 seaplane jet fighter project
- Latécoère 290
  - Latécoère 291
  - Latécoère 292
  - Latécoère 293
  - Latécoère 294
  - Latécoère 295
  - Latécoère 296
  - Latécoère 297
- Latécoère 298
- Latécoère 299
- Latécoère 300
  - Latécoère 301
  - Latécoère 302
- Latécoère 310
- Latécoère 340
- Latécoère 350
- Latécoère 360
- Latécoère 370
- Latécoère 380
  - Latécoère 381
  - Latécoère 382
  - Latécoère 383
  - Latécoère 384
  - Latécoère 385
  - Latécoère 386
- Latécoère 410
- Latécoère 420
- Latécoère 430
- Latécoère 440
  - Latécoère 441
  - Latécoère 442
  - Latécoère 443
- Latécoère 460
- Latécoère 470
- Latécoère 480
- Latécoère 490
  - Latécoère 491
  - Latécoère 492
  - Latécoère 493
  - Latécoère 494
- Latécoère 500
  - Latécoère 501
  - Latécoère 502
  - Latécoère 503
- Latécoère 510
- Latécoère 521 Lieutenant de Vaisseau Paris
  - Latécoère 520
  - Latécoère 522
  - Latécoère 523
  - Latécoère 524
  - Latécoère 525
- Latécoère 530
- Latécoère 531
- Latécoère 550
- Latécoère 560
- Latécoère 570
- Latécoère 580
- Latécoère 581
- Latécoère 582
- Latécoère 583
- Latécoère 590
- Latécoère 600
- Latécoère 601
- Latécoère 602
- Latécoère 611
  - Latécoère 610
  - Latécoère 612
  - Latécoère 613
  - Latécoère 614
  - Latécoère 615
  - Latécoère 616
  - Latécoère 617
- Latécoère 620
- Latécoère 631 Lionel de Marmier
  - Latécoère 630
  - Latécoère 632
  - Latécoère 633
  - Latécoère 634
  - Latécoère 635
  - Latécoère 636
  - Latécoère 637
  - Latécoère 638
  - Latécoère 639
- Latécoère 640
- Latécoère 670
  - Latécoère 671
  - Latécoère 672
  - Latécoère 673
  - Latécoère 675
- Latécoère 703
- Latécoère 710
- Latécoère 730
- Latécoère 740
- Latécoère 780
- Latécoère 790
- Latécoère 800
- Latécoère 810
- Latécoère 820
- Latécoère 830
- Latécoère 850
- Latécoère 860
- Latécoère 870
- Latécoère 880
- Latécoère 900

=== Latham ===
(Glen G. Latham)

- Latham Alco Coupe

=== Latham ===
(Société Latham)

- Latham 42
- Latham 43
- Latham 45
- Latham 47
- Latham 47P
- Latham 110
- Latham 230
- Latham C-1
- Latham E-5
- Latham HB.5
- Latham L.1
- Latham L.2
- Latham Trimoteur (cH.1)
- Latham CH.1 (Trimoteur)

=== Lathrop ===
(Lathrop Polytechnical Institute, Kansas City, MO)

- Lathrop School A

=== Lauér ===
- Lauér L.II

=== Lauret ===
- Lauret l'Ailette

=== Laville ===
(André Laville / BNK - Buro Novyikh Konstruktsii)

- Laville DI-4
- Laville PS-89

=== Lavochkin ===
- Lavochkin-Gorbunov-Goudkov LaGG-1
- Lavochkin-Gorbunov-Goudkov LaGG-3
- Lavochkin La-5
- Lavochkin La-7 "Fin"
- Lavochkin La-9 "Fritz"
- Lavochkin La-11 "Fang"
- Lavochkin La-15 "Fantail" "Type 21"
- Lavochkin Aircraft 120 La-9 precursor
- Lavochkin Aircraft 126 La-9 precursor
- Lavochkin Aircraft 150 "Type 3"
- Lavochkin Aircraft 152 "Type 4"
- Lavochkin Aircraft 154
- Lavochkin Aircraft 156 "Type 5"
- Lavochkin Aircraft 160 Strelka "Type 6"
- Lavochkin Aircraft 174
- Lavochkin Aircraft 174D
- Lavochkin Aircraft 174TK
- Lavochkin Aircraft 168 "Type 15"
- Lavochkin Aircraft 176
- Lavochkin Aircraft 180 (UTI La-15 / La-15UTI)
- Lavochkin Aircraft 190
- Lavochkin Aircraft 200
- Lavochkin La-250 'Anakonda'

=== Lavoisier ===
(Pierre Lavoisier)

- Lavoisier LP.24

=== Lavorini ===
(Nedo Lavorini)

- Lavorini Flying Flea

=== Lawhorn ===
(Jerry L Lawhorn, Anchorage, AK)

- Lawhorn Kee Bird
- Lawhorn LA-3

=== Lawrence ===
(George Lawrence )

- Lawrence 1909 Biplane

=== Lawrence ===
(Lawrence Institute of Technology, Southfield, MI)

- Lawrence Special

=== Lawrence-Lewis ===
(George R Lawrence, Chicago IL. 1915: Lawrence- (Harry S) Lewis Aeroplane Co, Chicago, IL)

- Lawrence-Lewis A-1
- Lawrence-Lewis B-1

=== Lawson ===
((Alfred William) Lawson Airplane Co, Green Bay and Milwaukee, WI, 1925: Lawson Aircraft Co, New York, NY)

- Lawson C-2 Air-Line
- Lawson L-4 Air-line (a.k.a.Midnight Air-Liner)
- Lawson MT-1
- Lawson MT-2
- Lawson Pursuit

=== Lay Brothers ===
(Henry and Jack D Lay, Helena, MT)

- Lay Brothers LT-1
- Lay brothers SL-4

=== Layzell Gyroplanes ===
- Layzell Cricket
- Layzell Merlin

=== Lazor-Rautenstrauch ===
(Jim Blick, Bethany, CT)

- Lazor-Rautenstrauch 1950 Monoplane (Belle of Bethany)

=== Lazarov ===
(Zvetan Lazarov / DAR) (Cyrillic:Лазаров)

- Laz-1
- Laz-2
- Laz-3
- Laz-4
- Laz-5
- Laz-6
- Laz-7
- Laz-7M
- Laz-8
- Laz-9
- Laz-10H
- Laz-11
- Laz-12
- Laz-13
- Laz-14

=== LCA ===
(LCA Srl.)

- LCA LH 212 Delta

=== L.D. ===
- L.D. Ca2

=== Leach ===
((Ronald) Leach Aero Service, Main & Franklin Sts, Hartford, MI)

- Leach 1933 Biplane

=== Leader ===
(Leader Aircraft Co (Pres: Karl Bjorkenheim), 4114 East 14th St, Oakland, CA)

- Leader Lancer

=== LEAF ===
(Leading Edge Air Foils, Peyton, CO)

- LEAF Graffiti
- LEAF Trike
- LEAF Tukan
- LEAF Antares 503
- LEAF Antares 582

=== Lear ===
(1929: (Archie and Claude) Lear Aircraft Corp, Pratt KS. 1954: (William P) Lear Inc, Santa Monica, CA, 1959: Established Swiss-Amaerican Aviation Corp, St Gallen, Switzerland. 1962: Lear-Siegler Corp. Jan 1963: Lear Aircraft Co, Wichita, KS)

- Lear 1929 Biplane
- Lear 1930 Monoplane
- LearStar

=== Learjet ===
(Learjet Industries Inc. 1969: Gates Learjet Corp, 6868 S Plumer Ave, Tucson, AZ, 1990: Acquired by Bombardier Inc, Canada (q.v.). 1997: Bombardier flight test center moved to Learjet facility, Wichita, KS)

- Learjet 23
- Learjet 24
- Learjet 25
- Learjet 28
- Learjet 29 Longhorn
- Learjet 31
- Learjet 35
- Learjet 36
- Learjet 40
- Learjet 45
- Learjet 50
- Learjet 55
- Learjet 60
- Learjet 65
- Learjet 70
- Learjet 75
- Learjet C-21A

=== Learfan ===
(Learfan Ltd.)

- Lear Fan 2100

=== Lebed ===
- Lebed I
- Lebed II
- Lebed III
- Lebed IV
- Lebed V
- Lebed VI
- Lebed VII
- Lebed VIII
- Lebed IX
- Lebed X
- Lebed XI
- Lebed XII
- Lebed XIII
- Lebed XIV
- Lebed XV
- Lebed XVI
- Lebed XVII
- Lebed XVIII
- Lebed XIX
- Lebed XXI
- Lebed XXII
- Lebed XXIII
- Lebed XXIV
- LM-1

=== Leblanc ===
(Albert Leblanc)

- Leblanc L.04A
- Leblanc L.52

=== Lebouder ===
(Robert Lebouder)

- Lebouder Autoplane

=== Lecoin-Damblanc ===
(Louis Lecoin and Louis Damblanc)

- Lecoin-Damblanc Alérion

=== Lederlin ===
- Lederlin 380L

=== Leduc ===
(René Leduc et Fils)

- Leduc 0.10
- Leduc 0.16
- Leduc 0.20
- Leduc 0.21
- Leduc 0.22

=== Leduc ===
(René Leduc, amateur constructor)

- Leduc RL-12
- Leduc RL-16
- Leduc RL-19
- Leduc RL-21
- Leduc RL-24

=== Lee ===
(Lee Inman School of Flying, Eugene, OR)

- Lee L-1P-S
- Lee L-2P-T

=== Lee-Richards ===
(Cedric Lee & G. Tilghman Richards)

- Lee-Richards annular bilpane
- Lee-Richards annular biplane glider
- Lee-Richards annular monoplane

=== Lefebvre ===
(Robert Lefebvre)

- Lefebvre MP-204 Busard
- Lefebvre MP-205 Busard

=== Legallois ===
(Roland Legallois)

- Legallois 01

=== Legend Aircraft ===
(Performance Aircraft Inc (Pres: Jeff Ackland), Olathe, KS, 2002: Legend Aircraft Inc)

- Legend Turbine Legend
- Legend JC 100

=== Legend Lite ===
(Legend Lite Inc, New Hamburg, Ontario, Canada)

- Legend Lite SS-11 Skywatch

=== Leger ===
(Claude Léger)

- Léger JCL.01

=== Leger ===
(René Léger)

- Léger RL.1
- Léger RL.2
- Léger RL.3

=== Leger Aviation ===
(Leger Aviation SARL, Archiac, France)

- Leger Pataplume 1
- Leger Pataplume 2

=== Leglaive ===
(Fernand Leglaive)

- Leglaive Miniplane
- Leglaive-Gaultier LG.150 (Fernand Leglaive & Roger Gaultier)

=== Léglise ===
(see SOSA)

=== Legrand-Simon ===
(Paul Legrand et Michel Simon)

- Legrand-Simon LS-50 Dauphine
- Legrand-Simon LS-60

=== Leighnor ===
(William C Leighnor, Hutchinson, KS)

- Leighnor Mirage 2
- Leighnor W-4 (a.k.a. WL-4, or Mirage)

=== Leins ===
(Ballard Leins, Tinsley Park and Auburn, IN)

- Leins Bal-Aire

=== Leineweber ===
(Curtis, William, and Victor H Leineweber, Chicago, IL)

- Leineweber 1921 Helicopter

=== Leka ===
(Leka Aeroplane Co (Theodor & Thermistocles M Leka, Naum P Mele), New York, NY)

- Leka 1930 Aeroplane

=== Lemaire ===
(René Lemaire)

- Lemaire RL.1
- Lemaire ARL-11 Babysquale

=== Lemberger ===
- Lemberger LD20b

=== leMire ===
(William LeMire )

- LeMire Proud Bird

=== Lemp ===
((First name unrecorded) Lemp, Augusta, GA)

- Lemp B

=== Lenderpergt ===
(Patrick Lenderpergt)

- Lenderpergt LP.1 Sybille

=== Lenert ===
(Lenert Aircraft Co, Pentwater MI. c.1940: Lenert Aviation Corp, 1220 Vance St, Toledo, OH)

- Lenert 1927 Biplane
- Lenert B
- Lenert C
- Lenert PT-2 (a.k.a. Zephyr)

=== Leonard ===
(George W Leonard, Santa Ana, CA)

- Leonard Special

=== Leonardo ===
(Leonardo S.p.A / Leonardo-Finmeccanica / Finmeccanica)

- Leonardo M-345 (re-vamped S.211)
- Leonardo DRS T-100 Integrated Training System
- Leonardo SW-4 Solo

=== Leopoldoff ===
- Leopoldoff L-3
- Leopoldoff L-31 Colibri
- Leopoldoff L-32 Colibri
- Leopoldoff L-4 Colibri
- Leopoldoff L-5 Colibri
- Leopoldoff L-53 Colibri
- Leopoldoff L-55 Colibri
- Leopoldoff L-6 Colibri
- Leopoldoff L-7 Colibri

=== Lepicier ===
(Evangeliste Lepicier, Brooklyn, NY)

- Lepicier A

=== Lerho ===
(Lerho Laboratories Inc, Pittsburgh, PA)

- Lerho Terraplane

=== Leroy ===
(G. Leroy)

- Leroy Motoplaneur - LEROY G., Aéroc-Club de l'Eure, Professeur Technique à l'Ecole Professionelle d'Évreux

=== Les Mureaux ===
see ANF Les Mureaux

=== Lesher ===
(Prof Edgar J Lesher, Univ of Michigan, MI)

- Lesher Nomad
- Lesher Teal

=== Let ===
(Letalski Konstrukcijski - Ljubljana)

- Let LK-1

=== Let ===
- Let Ae-45S
- Let Ae-145
- Let C-11
- Let L-200 Morava
- Let L-410 Turbolet
- Let L-610
- Aircraft Industries L 410 NG
- Let LF-109 Pionýr
- Let L-13 Blaník
- Let L-23 Super Blaník
- Let L-33 Solo
- Let TG-10

=== LET ===
(Letecké Zavody, Narodni Podnik)

- LET Brigadyr
- LET C-11
- Let L-200 Morava
- LET XLD-40 Mir
- LET L-40 MetaSokol
- LET L-410
- LET L-420
- LET Z-37 Cmelak
- LET L-610
- LET Aero 45S / Aero 145

=== LET Mraz ===
- M.1 Sokol
- M.2 Skaut
- M.3 Bonzo

=== Let-Mont ===
(Vikýřovice, Czech Republic)

- Let-Mont Piper UL
- Let-Mont Tulak

=== Leteneur ===
(Charles Leteneur)

- Leteneur 1947 aeroplane

=== Letord ===
(Société d'Aviation Letord / Établissements Letord)

- Letord Let.1
- Letord Let.2
- Letord Let.3
- Letord Let.4
- Letord Let.5
- Letord Let.6
- Letord Let.7
- Letord 9Bn 2
- Letord-Béchereau 2

=== Letord & Niepce ===
- Letord & Niepce Monoplan 1909

=== Letov ===
(Vojenska Tovarna na Letadla Letov)

- Letov Š-1
- Letov Š-2
- Letov Š-3
- Letov Š-4
- Letov Š-5
- Letov Š-6
- Letov Š-7
- Letov Š-8
- Letov Š-9
- Letov Š-10
- Letov Š-11
- Letov Š-12
- Letov Š-13
- Letov Š-14
- Letov Š-15
- Letov Š-16
  - Letov Š-16J
  - Letov Š-116
  - Letov Š-216
  - Letov Š-316
  - Letov Š-416
  - Letov Š-516
  - Letov Š-616
  - Letov Š-716
  - Letov Š-816
  - Letov Š-916
- Letov Š-17
- Letov Š-18
  - Letov Š-118
  - Letov Š-218
- Letov Š-19
- Letov Š-20
- Letov Š-21
- Letov Š-22
- Letov Š-25
- Letov Š-27
- Letov Š-28
  - Letov Š-128
  - Letov Š-228
  - Letov Š-328
  - Letov Š-428
  - Letov Š-528
- Letov Š-31
  - Letov Š-131
  - Letov Š-231
  - Letov Š-331
  - Letov Š-431
- Letov Š-32
- Letov Š-33
- Letov Š-39
  - Letov Š-139
  - Letov Š-239
- Letov Š-50
- Letov L-8
- Letov TOM-8
- Letov L-101
- Letov L-290
- Letov LF-107 Luňák
- Letov XLF-207 Laminar
- Letov SH-1
- Letov SM-1
- Letov Sm A 1
- Letov LK-1
- Letov LK-2 Sluka
- Letov LK-3
- Letov ST-4 Aztek
- Letov TL-32 Typhoon

=== Levasseur ===
(Sociéte Pierre Levasseur Aéronautique)

- Levasseur PL.1
- Levasseur PL.1 T-O-3
- Levasseur PL.2
- Levasseur PL.3 AM3
- Levasseur PL.4
- Levasseur PL.5
- Levasseur PL.5 C2B 1926 Two-seater biplane naval fighter. 3 examples constructed. Sesquiplane wing layout . Fuselage wooden, but with a marine hull design.
- Levasseur PL.6
- Levasseur PL.7
- Levasseur PL.8
- Levasseur PL 8 'Oiseau Blanc'
- Levasseur PL.9
- Levasseur PL.10
- Levasseur PL.101
- Levasseur PL.104 1935 Armed reconnaissance three-seat biplane project with a Hispano-Suiza 12 Xbr engine.
- Levasseur PL.105 1935 Armed reconnaissance three-seat biplane project with a Hispano-Suiza 9 V engine.
- Levasseur PL.106 1935 Armed reconnaissance three-seat biplane project with a Hispano-Suiza 12 Xbr engine with PL 15 radiator layout.
- Levasseur PL.107
- Levasseur PL.108
- Levasseur PL 109 1939 No details
- Levasseur PL.11
- Levasseur PL.12
- Levasseur PL.14
- Levasseur PL.15
- Levasseur PL.151
- Levasseur PL.154
- Levasseur PL.200
- Levasseur PL.201
- Levasseur PL.300 1935 Biplane single engine torpedo bomber. Project only with enclosed cockpit and folding wings. Powered by Hispano-Suiza 12 Ybrg. Two seater as a bomber and three seat in the reconnaissance role.
- Levasseur PL.301 1935 Biplane single engine torpedo bomber floatplane. Project only with enclosed cockpit and exposed rear-gunner position. Powered by Hispano-Suiza 12 Ybrg.
- Levasseur PL.400
- Levasseur PL.401
- Levasseur-Abrial A-1
- Levasseur Wibault (1922) night-bomber design
- Levasseur Saint Raphël
- Levasseur Landeroin-Robert Monoplan 1913 Three-seat experimental triple wing monoplane with distinctive rollover frame-come forward wing support.

=== Levi ===
(Renato Levi)

- Levi RL3 Monsoon
- Levi RL6 Go-Plane

=== LeVier ===
(Tony LeVier)

- LeVier Cosmic Wind

=== Levy ===
(Hydravions Georges Levy)

- Levy G.L.40
- Levy Type R
- Levy-Besson (Georges Levy, Marcel Besson)
- Levy-Besson HB.2 (Georges Levy, Marcel Besson)
- Levy-Biche 4 HO.2
- Levy-Biche LB.2 (Jean Biche / Constructions Aéronautiques J Levy)
- Levy-Biche LB.4
- Levy-Biche LB.6 (Jean Biche / Constructions Aéronautiques J Levy)
- Levy-Lepen R

=== Lewis ===
(Charles H Lewis, Denver, CO)

- Lewis 6425

=== Lewis & Vought ===
(Lewis & Vought Corporation)

- Lewis & Vought VE-7
- Lewis & Vought VE-8
- Lewis & Vought VE-9

=== Lewis-American ===
((Paul) Lewis-American Airways Inc/Gray Goose Airplane Co, Denver, CO)

- Lewis-American A
- Lewis-American Auto-Airplane
- Lewis-American Gray Goose

=== Leyat ===
(Marcel Leyat)

- Leyat biplane
- Leyat glider
- Leyat convertible biplane
- Leyat 1928 convertible biplane
- Leyat Hélica Avion

=== Leyat-Jacquemin ===
(Marcel Leyat et André Jacquemin)

- Leyat-Jacquemin 1933 monoplane
- Leyat-Jacquemin 1934 monoplane
- Leyat-Jacquemin glider

=== LFG ===
(Luftfahrzeug Gesellschaft m.b.H. Berlin-Charlottenburg) - (a.k.a. LFG Roland / LFG Stralsund / LFG Bittersfeld)

- LFG Roland Pfeilflieger
- LFG Roland C.I
- LFG Roland C.II
- LFG Roland C.III
- LFG Roland C.V
- LFG Roland C.VIII
- LFG Roland D.I
- LFG Roland D.II
- LFG Roland D.III
- LFG Roland D.IV
- LFG Roland D.V
- LFG Roland D.VI
- LFG Roland D.VII
- LFG Roland D.VII
- LFG Roland D.VIII
- LFG Roland D.IX
- LFG Roland D.X
- LFG Roland D.XI
- LFG Roland D.XII
- LFG Roland D.XIII
- LFG Roland D.XIV
- LFG Roland D.XV (I)
- LFG Roland D.XV (II)
- LFG Roland D.XVI
- LFG Roland D.XVII
- LFG Roland Dr.I
- LFG Roland E.I
- LFG Roland G.I
- LFG Roland R.I
- LFG V 1
- LFG V 2
- LFG V 3 Susanna
- LFG V 3a Susanne
- LFG V 8
- LFG V 13 Strela
  - LFG V 130 Strela
- LFG V 14
- LFG V 15
- LFG V 16
- LFG V 17
- LFG V 18 Sassnitz
- LFG V 20 Arkona
- LFG V 23
- LFG V 25
- LFG V 26
- LFG V 27
- LFG V 28
- LFG V 36
- LFG V 39
- LFG V 40
- LFG V 42
- LFG V 44
- LFG V 52
- LFG V 58
- LFG V 59
- LFG V 60
- LFG V 61
- LFG V 101 Jasmund
- LFG Bitterfeld W
- LFG Bitterfeld W.16
- LFG Bitterfeld WD
- LFG Stralsund V 19

=== LFU ===
(Leichtflugtechnik-Union)

- LFU 205

=== LH Aviation ===
- LH Aviation LH-10 Ellipse
