= V58 =

V58 or V-58 may refer to:

- LFG V 58, a German sport biplane
- Vanadium-58, an isotope of vanadium
- Vestergade 58, a listed building in Aarhus, Denmark
- Gallery V58, an art gallery in Mejlen in Aarhus, Denmark
- V58, a voice encoding used in ANDVT
- V58, encounter for other and unspecified procedures and aftercare, in the ICD-9 V codes
