= Diesel Air Dair 100 =

Dair 100
- Type: Aircraft engine
- National origin: United Kingdom
- Manufacturer: Diesel Air

The Diesel Air Dair 100 is an opposed-piston aircraft diesel engine, designed and produced by Diesel Air Ltd of Olney, Buckinghamshire for use in airships, home-built kit planes and light aircraft. The prototype was built in the 1990s and exhibited at PFA (now LAA) airshows. Although Diesel Air engines have been fitted to an AT-10 airship and to a Luscombe 8A monoplane, production numbers have been very limited.

== Design and development ==
The Dair 100 engine is a twin-cylinder two-stroke, opposed-piston, 1,810 cc (110.5 cu in) displacement, liquid-cooled, diesel engine direct drive design. It produces 100 hp (75 kW) at 2500 rpm, with a compression ratio of 18:1. The engine has two cylinders and two crankshafts linked to four pistons, the combustion chamber formed between the crowns of the pistons. There are no poppet valves, each cylinder having a ring of ports at each end. In this "one-direction (uniflow)" engine these ports, respectively, admit air and expel exhaust gases. This design eliminates the need for a cylinder head and camshafts. Scavenging is assisted by a centrifugal air pump, the pump also serving to provide a mild supercharging effect. Fitment of an exhaust-driven turbocharger is permissible.

The engine may use either diesel fuel (DERV) or Jet-A1 kerosene (AVTUR). Jet-A1 is more readily available at airfields, but its reduced lubricity (compared to diesel fuel) could mean that additional cylinder lubrication may be required. Fuel is directly injected into each cylinder, pressure being supplied by a hydraulically-governed mechanical fuel pump.

Dry sump lubrication is by high pressure pump delivering oil to plain main bearings and con-rod bearings.

== Applications ==
- Advanced Airship Technologies Group AT-10 airship
- Luscombe 8A

== Specifications (Dair 100) ==
Data from Tacke

=== General characteristics ===
- Type: Twin cylinder, two stroke diesel aircraft engine
- Bore: 80 mm (3.1 in)
- Stroke: 90 mm (3.5 in)
- Displacement: 1,810 cc (110.5 cu in)
- Length: 698 mm (27.5 in)
- Width: 368 mm (14.5 in)
- Height: 563 mm (22.2 in)
- Dry weight: 93 kg (205.0 lb)

=== Components ===
- Fuel type: diesel or Jet A1
- Cooling system: liquid cooling
- Reduction gear: none (direct drive to propeller)

=== Performance ===
- Power output: 100 hp (75 kW)
- Compression ratio: 18:1

== See also ==
- Zoche aero-diesel

Related lists

- List of aircraft engines
