= LFG V 18 Sassnitz =

1920s German flying boat

18 Sassnitz

General information
- Type: flying boat airliner
- National origin: Germany
- Manufacturer: Luft-Fahrzeug-Gesellschaft (LFG)
- Designer: G. Baazt
- Number built: 2

History
- First flight: 1921

The LFV V 18 Sassnitz was a German flying boat able to hold up to eight passengers. Only one is known to have flown.

== Design and development ==
The largely metal LFG V 18 Sassnitz flying boat, named after the town on Germany's north-eastern, Baltic coast, was an enlarged, more powerful development of the LFG V 8 Bärbel. It was a three bay biplane with slight forward stagger, its wings braced together with three pairs of parallel, forward leaning interplane struts on each side. The lower wing was in two parts and mounted on top of the fuselage. Both thin-section wings were rectangular in plan out to blunted tips, with outboard ailerons vertically interconnected by a streamlined linking strut. Its wingtip floats had completely enclosed streamlined mountings below the outer wings.

It was powered by an uncowled, pusher configuration, water-cooled Mercedes D.IIIa engine which was strut-mounted from the fuselage just under the upper wing, its two-bladed propeller behind the upper trailing edge and above the lower.

Like the V 8, the V 18 had a rectangular cross-section fuselage, slender behind the wings and curving upwards to the tail. Its longer forward fuselage allowed a raised enclosed cabin with four windows on each side, seating either four or eight passengers. The pilot had an open cockpit, raised up behind the cabin. The tail was very similar to that of the V 8a, all its surfaces rectangular apart from a little rounding of the upper leading edge of the fin, which carried a balanced rudder. The tailplane was high on the fin and braced from below with a single strut on each side. Balanced elevators pivoted on the rudder post.

The V 18 was LFG's first all-metal aircraft. They also offered a wooden version with similar power and weight.

== Operational history ==
The prototype was briefly flown over the Baltic and also provided sightseeing trips.

In July 1921 LFG reported that they had built two V 18s, one metal and the other wood, and that these were now stored following Allied restrictions on German aircraft construction after World War I. It is not known if the latter flew.

== Specifications ==
Data from Gütschow, 1978

General characteristics

- Crew: one pilot
- Capacity: up to eight passengers
- Length: 10.17 m (33 ft 4 in)
- Wingspan: 16.50 m (54 ft 2 in)
- Height: 3.30 m (10 ft 10 in)
- Empty weight: 1,000 kg (2,205 lb)
- Gross weight: 1,660 kg (3,660 lb)
- Powerplant: × Mercedes D.IIIa water-cooled, six cylinder inline, 117 kW (157 hp) 160 PS
- Propellers: 2-bladed

Performance

- Maximum speed: 140 km/h (87 mph, 76 kn)
- Endurance: 5½ hrs with 4 passengers, 2¾ hrs with 8.
