= Lambert Mission 212 =

Mission 212

General information
- Type: Four-seat kit built
- Manufacturer: Lambert Aircraft Engineering BVBA, Wevelgem
- Number built: 2

History
- First flight: 13 July 2004

The Lambert Mission 212 is a conventionally laid out low-wing, fixed undercarriage, single-engine, four-seat kit built aircraft designed in the UK by a Belgian college student. Kits are manufactured in Belgium.

== Design and development ==
The M212 has had an unusually long gestation time. It was designed in 1992 by Filip Lambert, then a student at the College of Aeronautics, Cranfield, and was selected as one of three winners of the Royal Aeronautical Society Light Aircraft Competition in 1995. Construction of the M212-100 prototype began in 1996. This aircraft was registered in the UK in 2000 and was displayed, complete apart from some engine and fuel supply systems, at the Popular Flying Association (PFA) Rally held at Cranfield in June 2002. The first flight, delayed by another two years, took place on 13 April 2004 at Cranfield with Roger Bailey as pilot.

The M212 is an all-composite aircraft with 95% of its weight in pre-pregs. The wing has two main spars plus an auxiliary one, all formed from glass and carbon fibre in epoxy resin. In plan the wing is gently straight tapered, with most sweep on the trailing edge and with turned up wingtips. It has 5° of dihedral and 2° of washout. Electrically actuated single slot flaps are fitted. Fin and rudder are swept, with a small dorsal fin; the rudder is horn-balanced. The tailplane is rectangular and set a little above the fuselage, carrying inset elevators.

The fuselage is a monocoque construction, tapering strongly to the rear. The cockpit seats four in two rows with dual controls in front, covered by a forward-hinged, single-piece canopy. There are two side windows for the rear seat passengers. The M212 has a fixed tricycle undercarriage, the mainwheels mounted on forward-leaning cantilever legs in narrow chord fairings, attached to the fuselage. The mainwheels have brakes and the nosewheel is steerable.

The first M212 is powered by a 112 kW (150 hp) Lycoming O-320-ED flat-four engine driving a three-bladed propeller. Other engines have been considered, including the 134 kW (180 hp) Superior X-360, a flat-four related to the Lycoming O-360, and the 134-149 kW (180-200 hp) DeltaHawk DH180A4 liquid-cooled, four-cylinder, two-stroke Diesels.

The M212 was initially intended to feature a Zoche aero-diesel ZO 01A, a radical single-row "cross-4" engine of 2,660 cc (162 cu in), producing up to 150 hp (112 kW) @ 2500 rpm. This engine was to be compact, lightweight (84 kg/185 lb), and economical, consuming some 21 litres per hour @ 75% power. As the Zoche company showed no signs of nearing production, Lambert had to settle for a more conventional, but readily available, option.

== Operational history ==
In the mid-2000s Lambert were concentrating on the Mission 106 and Mission 212 kits were not produced until late 2006. In May 2010 the first kit-built example and second M212, registered in the Netherlands, was flown. It attempted an around-the-world flight which was ended by an engine fire and an emergency landing in the Philippines.

== Variants ==
Data from Jane's All the World's Aircraft 2011/12

M212-100
First prototype, proof-of-principle, one example only.
M212-200
Production base level four-seater, flyaway or kit. Certification to JAR/FAR 23 planned.
M212-300
Proposed two-seat aerobatic trainer, now abandoned.
M212-400
Four seat version with increased baggage and range (1,850 km or 1,000 mi. Maximum takeoff weight 1,000 kg (2,425 lb); optional retractable undercarriage.
M216
Proposed version with retractable gear.

== Specifications (provisional) ==
Data from Jane's All the World's Aircraft 2011/12

General characteristics

- Crew: one
- Capacity: three
- Length: 7.40 m (24 ft 3 in)
- Wingspan: 9.80 m (32 ft 2 in)
- Height: 2.90 m (9 ft 6 in)
- Wing area: 12.00 m^{2} (129.2 sq ft)
- Aspect ratio: 8.0
- Empty weight: 722 kg (1,592 lb)
- Max takeoff weight: 1,150 kg (2,535 lb)
- Fuel capacity: 160 L (42.3 US gal; 35.2 Imp gal) in production aircraft
- Powerplant: 1 × Superior XP-360 flat-four, 134 kW (180 hp)
- Propellers: 3-bladed

Performance

- Maximum speed: 259 km/h (161 mph, 140 kn)
- Cruise speed: 233 km/h (145 mph, 126 kn) at 60% power
- Stall speed: 99 km/h (62 mph, 53 kn) flaps down
- Never exceed speed: 338 km/h (210 mph, 183 kn)
- Range: 1,018 km (633 mi, 550 nmi) maximum fuel, 60% power
- Rate of climb: 4.6 m/s (910 ft/min) maximum at sea level
- Take-off run: 280 m (920 ft)
