= Zoche aero-diesel =

German aircraft engine family under development

Zoche ZO series
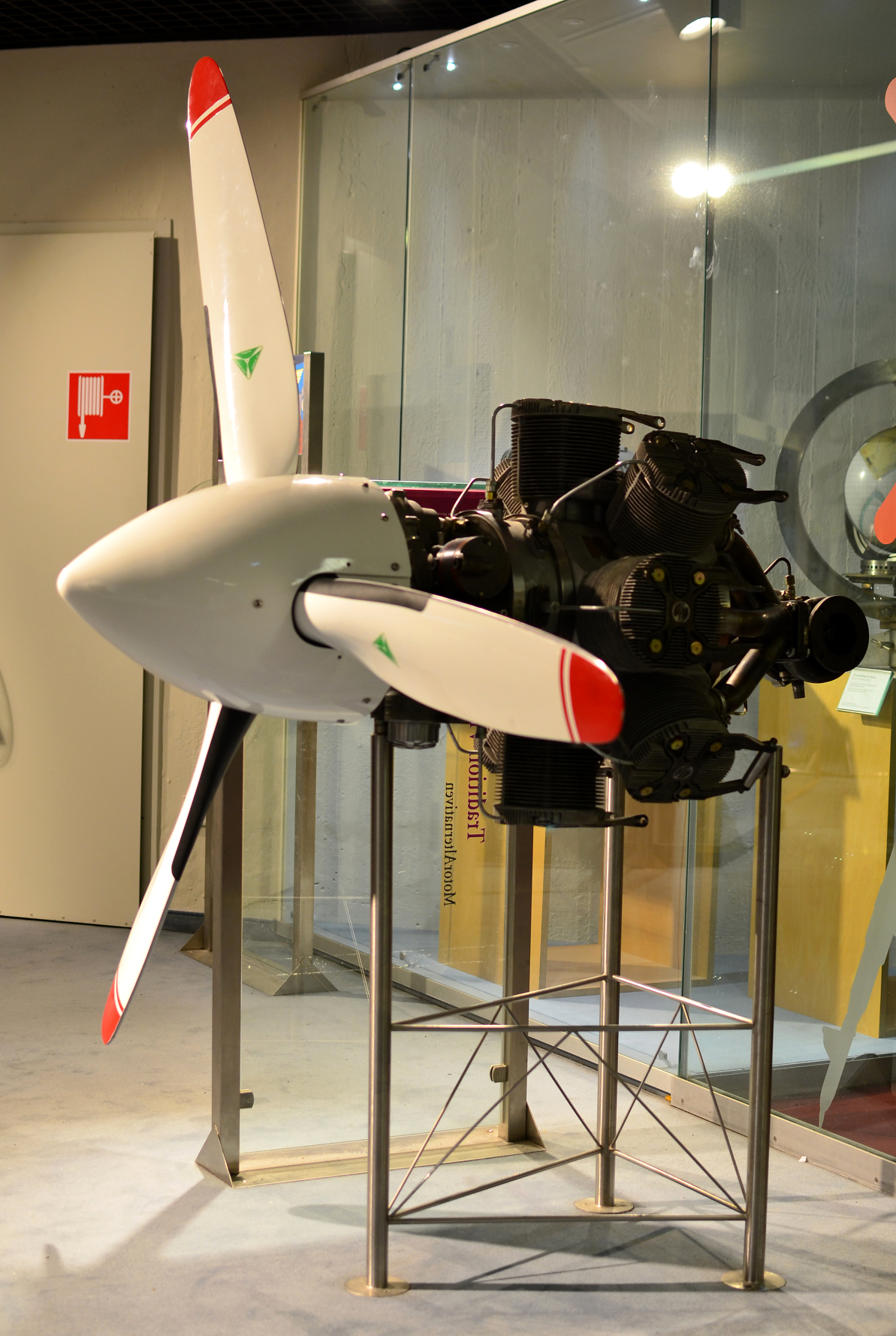
- Type: "Cross-8" radial aero-engine
- National origin: Germany
- Manufacturer: Zoche

The Zoche aero-diesels are a trio of radical German prototype diesel radial aero-engines intended for light aircraft, designed by Michael and Georg Zoche in the 1990s. Zoche aero-diesels are modular piston engines and are all direct-drive, air-cooled, radial two-stroke diesels with up to four cylinders per row. They all feature direct fuel-injection, two-stage charging (turbocharger and supercharger), and intercooling. In each plane (or row), all the pistons connect to a single throw on the crankshaft.

The testing and gestation period of the Zoche engines has already lasted over 25 years; and whether or when production may eventually start is unknown. However, in 2019, Georg Zoche posted this message online: "Don't worry and remain patient; we are working on it".

== Design and development ==
The range comprises three radial engines, namely: a "cross-4"; a twin-row "cross-8"; and a V-twin. As yet, there are no plans for a 3-cylinder version.

The AOPA website explains the "cross-4" ZO 01A as follows: "The radial design was chosen for its ability to be effectively air-cooled and 100% balanced at all rpm with a simple counterweight system. All four connecting rods are attached to a single crankshaft throw. This prevents any crankshaft twisting, which is hard to balance out in opposed-configuration engines. Zoche engines use a pneumatic starting system that does away with the need for a heavy-duty starter and battery system". Propeller rotation is clockwise (viewed from the cockpit). Engine mountings are attached to the cylinder heads. Engines are to be certified to JAR-E and FAR 33, and a TBO of 2,000 hours is anticipated.

The founder of the project is Michael Zoche, who claims that the ZO engines will have the following advantages:

- they will be lightweight, compact (with low frontal area) and very smooth;
- low fuel consumption; high power-to-weight ratio;
- the lubrication system will allow aerobatics;
- diesel fuel injection, so no carburetor icing;
- direct-driven generator, so no drive belts;
- good reliability through a low part count and absence of poppet valves;
- pneumatic starting obviates both electric starter motor and heavy starter battery;
- complete absence of rubber hoses; cheaper parts through modularity;
- reduced fire risk compared to avgas;
- good power output, even at altitudes up to 9,000 feet (3,000 m).
- the engines will also have a "classic radial" appearance that is appropriate for some aircraft types.

A Zoche engine has run effectively in wind tunnel tests, but Zoche seem barely any closer to production than they were a in 2010. Experimental engine manufacturers seem to experience difficulties in proceeding beyond the prototype stage. The cited engine weights include: starter-generator, hydraulic propeller-governor, turbocharger and supercharger, and oil- and fuel-filters.

== Zoche engine variants ==
ZO 01A
Single-row cross-4, 2,660 cc (162 cu in), (max) 150 hp (112 kW) @ 2500 rpm, 84 kg (185 lb)), fuel consumption 21 litres/h @ 75% power.

ZO 02A
Double-row cross-8, 5,330 cc (325 cu in), (max) 300 hp (224 kW) @ 2500 rpm, 123 kg (271 lb)), fuel consumption 42 litres/h @ 75% power.

ZO 03A
V-twin, 1,330 cc (81 cu in), (max) 70 hp (52 kW) @ 2500 rpm, 55 kg (121 lb)), fuel consumption 10 litres/h @ 75% power.

ZO 04A
A 2,000 hp (1,500 kW) compound diesel engine for use in the Sentinel 5000 airship on vectoring mounts.

A consequence of the modular design, with all engines sharing parts (such as an intercooler), is that the larger engines have a much higher power to weight ratio than the smaller engines, as follows:

- The 8 cylinder ZO 01A claims 2.43 bhp per kilogram;
- The 4 cylinder ZO 02A claims 1.78 bhp per kilogram;
- The 2 cylinder ZO 03A claims 1.27 bhp per kilogram.

== Lambert Mission ==
The Lambert Mission 212, a kit-built 4-seat aircraft from Belgium, was initially designed around the Zoche ZO1A engine; but, with the non-appearance of the Zoche, Lambert were obliged to select other engines, the DeltaHawk® DH200A4 (or DH180A4), or the XP-360 engine. In May 2010 the second M212 Mission (and first kit-built example) was successfully flown.

== See also ==
Comparable engines

- Thielert Centurion
- Wilksch Airmotive — WAM 100 (100 hp), WAM 120 (120 hp) and WAM 160 (160 hp)
- Diesel Air — 100 hp (75 kW) twin-cylinder two-stroke opposed-piston engine
- Continental O-300
- Continental O-360
- ULPower UL260i
- MidWest AE series

Related lists

- List of aircraft engines
