= Max Plan PF.204 Busard =

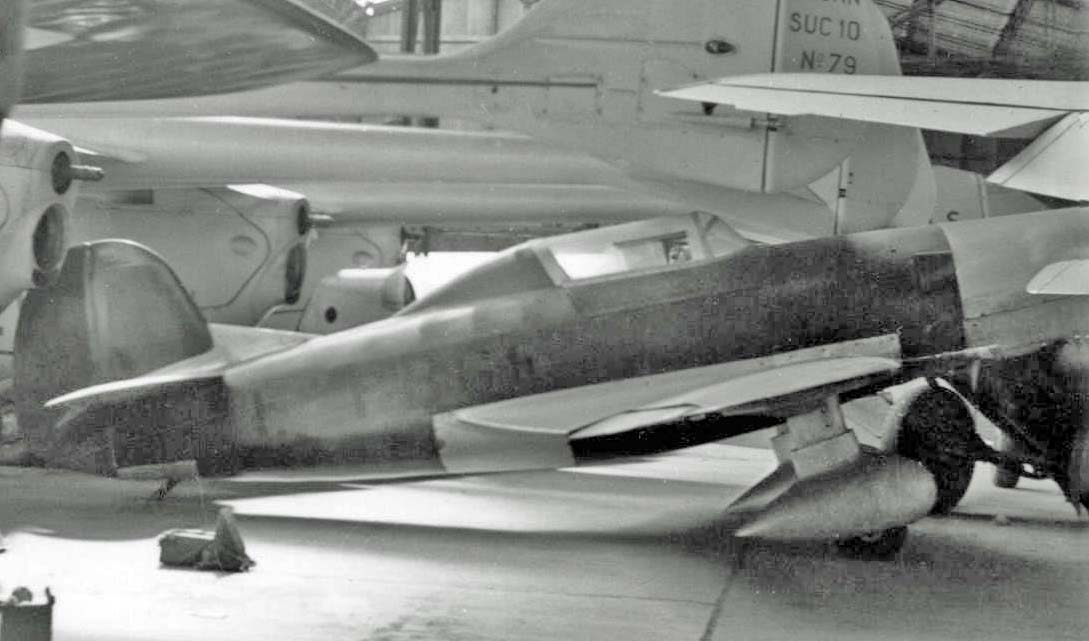
- The sole PF.204 Busard stored at Mitry-Mory airfield near Paris in May 1957

General information
- Type: light sporting monoplane
- National origin: France
- Manufacturer: Max Plan
- Designer: Max Plan
- Primary user: private pilot owner
- Number built: 1

History
- Introduction date: 1952
- First flight: 5 June 1952
- Retired: by 1963

The Max Plan PF.204 Busard was a French-built light sporting monoplane of the early 1950s. Following some modifications it was redesignated as PF.214; a planned derivative, the PF.215, was never made. The plane led to the subsequent construction of the Lefebvre Busard, a single-seat racing aircraft built marketed for homebuilding.

== Development ==
The PF.204 Busard was designed and built by Monsieur Max Plan for personal use as a racing and sporting monoplane. The PF.204 was of all-wood construction with plywood skin. The aircraft was fitted with a fixed cantilever undercarriage enclosed by light alloy fairings.

== Operational history ==
Only one example of the Busard was completed in 1952. By 1956 it had received several modifications, the most noticeable being a revised engine cowling and enlarged cockpit; at this point it was redesignated the PF. 214. At that time there were plans to replace the Minié with a 90 hp (67 kW) Continental C90 4-cylinder horizontally opposed engine, producing the PF.215.

After some years of active flying, it was placed in storage at Mitry-Mory airfield on the northeast outskirts of Paris by May 1957. It no longer appeared on the French civil aircraft register by 1964. By 2006 the aircraft was in storage at the Musée Regional de l'Air, Angers - Loire Airport, France.

== Variants ==
Max Plan PF.204 Busard
The original racer, designed and built by Max Plan, powered by a 75 hp (56 kW) Minié 4.DC.32 h4-cyl. horizontally opposed piston engine.
Max Plan PF.214 Busard
The sole MP.204 re-designated after modifications to the engine cowling and an enlarged cockpit.
Max Plan PF.215 Busard
A planned derivative to have been powered by a 90 hp (67 kW) Continental C90 4-cyl. horizontally opposed piston engine.

== Specifications (PF.204) ==
Data from Green (1956)

General characteristics

- Crew: 1
- Length: 17 ft 7 in (5.35 m)
- Wingspan: 18 ft 1 in (5.5 m)
- Wing area: 65 sq ft (6.0 m^{2})
- Empty weight: 419 lb (190 kg)
- Gross weight: 728 lb (330 kg)
- Max takeoff weight: 794 lb (360 kg)
- Powerplant: 1 × Minié 4.D.32 4-cylinder horizontally opposed, 75 hp (56 kW)

Performance

- Maximum speed: 130 mph (210 km/h, 110 kn)
- Cruise speed: 99 mph (160 km/h, 86 kn)
- Endurance: 2 hours 30 minutes
