= Lefebvre Busard =

MP.205 Busard

General information
- Type: Sport aircraft
- National origin: France
- Manufacturer: homebuilt
- Designer: Robert Lefebvre

History
- First flight: 1975

The Lefebvre MP.205 Busard (French: "Harrier") was a single-seat racing aircraft built in France in 1975 and marketed for homebuilding. Its design was adapted from that of the Lefebvre MP-204 'Busard' racer (itself derived from the Max Plan PF.204 Busard), that had been conceived to attempt a world airspeed record in the under 500 kg class in 1949. Compared to its predecessor, the Busard was lightened and intended to be powered by a lower-power engine, and simplified for construction by amateurs. Indeed, the prototype was built by the designer with assistance from students at the Albert Camus technical school of Rouen. Like the MP.204 that it was based on, the Busard was a streamlined, low-wing, cantilever monoplane of conventional design with fixed, tricycle undercarriage. Provision was made for the use of either an aero engine, or a Volkswagen automotive engine.

== Variants ==
Lefebvre MP-204 'Busard'
Derived from the PF.204 by Robert Lefebvre, powered by a 65 hp (48 kW) Continental A65 4-cyl. horizontally-opposed piston engine.
Lefebvre MP-205 'Busard'
Derivative of the MP-204, powered by a 90 hp (67 kW) Continental C90 4-cyl. horizontally-opposed piston engine.

== Specifications (MP-205 'Busard') ==
General characteristics

- Crew: One pilot
- Length: 5.35 m (17 ft 7 in)
- Wingspan: 6.00 m (19 ft 8 in)
- Wing area: 6.0 m^{2} (64 sq ft)
- Empty weight: 239 kg (527 lb)
- Gross weight: 345 kg (760 lb)
- Powerplant: 1 × Continental C90 , 67 kW (90 hp)

Performance

- Maximum speed: 290 km/h (180 mph, 160 kn)
