= Lambert Twin Monocoach =

American twin-engine aircraft

Monocoach H

General information
- Type: Twin-engine, 4 or 5 seat light aircraft
- National origin: U.S.A.
- Manufacturer: Lambert Aircraft Corporation
- Designer: Tom Towle
- Number built: 1

History
- First flight: 1936

The Lambert Twin Monocoach was a light, twin-engined U.S. aircraft, designed to carry three or four passengers. Initially it was fitted with economical, low-powered engines but even given a large increase of power it failed to attract customers.

== Design ==
The Lambert Corporation got into financial difficulties and failed during 1936, the year that the Monocoach first flew. As a result, the earliest pre-World War II accounts of it use the Lambert name and later ones, like Jane's All the World's Aircraft 1938 refer to it as the Monocoupe Monocoach after the succeeding company. Although it was designated the Type H from the start, it has also been referred to as the Lambert or Monocoupe Twin Monocoach to distinguish it from the earlier Lambert Monocoach, a single-engine aircraft.

The Monocoach H had a low, one-piece wooden wing, built around two box-spars with girder-type ribs and fabric covering. In plan the very low aspect ratio (5.6) wing was rectangular out to semi-elliptical tips. It had short Frise type ailerons outboard; between them, along the trailing edge and under the fuselage, were NACA-type split, balanced flaps. The ailerons and flaps were the only metal framed wing structures.

The Monocoach's two 67 kW (90 hp) Lambert R-266 five-cylinder radial engines were mounted ahead of the wing leading edge under broad-chord cowlings with short nacelles which reached back to mid-wing. There were oil tanks in the nacelles and each engine had a fuel tank in the wing with a total fuel capacity was 265 L (58 imp gal; 70 US gal).

Its fuselage had a welded steel tube structure, metal skinned ahead of the wing and fabric covered aft. The cabin had side-by-side seats, equipped with dual control, positioned just behind the leading edge and a bench seat for two or three behind the crew. Slender-framed windows reached almost to the trailing edge; the cabin was accessed through a wide, port-side door and there were baggage spaces in the nose and under the rear seat.

The Monocoach's horizontal tail was similar in plan to that of the wing and its vertical tail was rounded, with a large fin. The rear control surfaces were all balanced and fitted with trim tabs. All rear surfaces had steel structures and were fabric covered.

Its retractable undercarriage was conventional and had a track of 3.0 m (9 ft 10 in). The mainwheels, which were fitted with hydraulic brakes and mounted on single shock absorber legs, were electrically retracted rearwards into the engine nacelles. The tailwheel was steerable and was enclosed in a streamlined fairing.

== Development ==
The exact date of the first flight is uncertain but it was probably in the summer of 1936; the October 1936 issue of Popular Aviation reported that it had just completed its initial flight but also that it had been on a long demonstration tour, covering 1,868 mi (3,006 km) in a week.

The Lambert-powered aircraft was never certified. Despite the possibly optimistic manufacturer's performance figures, it was judged short of power and also had poor directional stability with one engine out. The radials were therefore replaced with a pair of 150 hp (110 kW) Menasco D-4 four-cylinder, inverted air-cooled in-line engines. Fin area was increased by the replacement of the central surface by two fins almost at the tips of the tailplane.

At the end of the 1930s, Lambert gave the original and later variants the names Zenith and Zephyr respectively.

== Variants ==
Monocoach H or Zenith
Lambert engines, single fin.

Monocoach H or Zephyr
Menasco engines, twin fins.

== Specifications (Lambert engines) ==
Data from Jane's All the World's Aircraft 1938

General characteristics

- Crew: One
- Capacity: Three or four passengers
- Length: 24 ft 6 in (7.47 m)
- Wingspan: 36 ft 0 in (10.97 m)
- Height: 7 ft 10 in (2.39 m)
- Wing area: 231.2 sq ft (21.48 m^{2})
- Aspect ratio: 5.6
- Airfoil: NACA 2315
- Empty weight: 1,182 lb (536 kg)
- Gross weight: 3,220 lb (1,461 kg)
- Fuel capacity: 265 L (58 imp gal; 70 US gal)
- Powerplant: 2 × Lambert R-266 5-cylinder radial, 90 hp (67 kW) each
- Propellers: 2-bladed Hamilton Standard

Performance

- Maximum speed: 150 mph (240 km/h, 130 kn)
- Cruise speed: 133 mph (214 km/h, 116 kn) at 8,600 ft (2,600 m)
- Range: 875 mi (1,408 km, 760 nmi)
- Service ceiling: 10,800 ft (3,300 m) service
- Rate of climb: 560 ft/min (2.8 m/s)
- Wing loading: 13.9 lb/sq ft (68 kg/m^{2})
- Landing speed: 48 mph (77 km/h; 42 kn) with flaps extended
