= Laros-100 =

Russian light aircraft designed for aerobatics flying

General information
- Type: two-seat aerobatic aircraft
- National origin: Russia
- Manufacturer: Laros OKB
- Designer: Vladimir P. Lapshin
- Number built: 1

History
- First flight: 14 June 2013

The Laros-100 is a Russian light aircraft specifically designed for aerobatics flying.

== Design and development ==
The Laros-100 has a high wing of rectangular plan mounted at 0° angle of incidence and without dihedral. It has two spars which, like the ribs, are made from aluminium alloy and is aluminium-skinned. Its ailerons are horn-balanced; there are no flaps. A single faired strut on each side braces the wing to the lower fuselage.

The fuselage has a steel tube structure which is aluminium-skinned. Its 200 hp (150 kW) Lycoming AEIO-360 engine is conventionally nose-mounted and drives a two-blade propeller. Apart from its windscreen, the cabin is under the wing and seats two in tandem, with access by two starboard-side, forward-hinged doors. In profile the fuselage tapers to the tail, providing ground clearance for a tailwheel undercarriage. Both tail surfaces are trapezoidal in outline, with the tailplane on top of the fuselage. The port-side elevator carries an electrically powered trim tab.

The prototype has conventional landing gear, though proposed production models offered nosewheel gear as an alternative. The mainwheels are mounted, unfaired, on cantilever legs and has hydraulic brakes. The tailwheel is steerable and fully castoring.

== Operational history ==
The Laros-100 first flew on 14 June 2013 from Drakino airfield, Serpukhov, piloted by Yevgeny Frolov. It first appeared in public two months later at the 2013 Moscow Salon. There are no reports of production or of sales apart from that of the prototype, which was put on offer in 2014.

== Specifications ==
Data from Jane's All the World's Aircraft 2016-17

General characteristics

- Crew: two
- Length: 6.45 m (21 ft 2 in)
- Wingspan: 7.15 m (23 ft 5 in)
- Height: 1.85 m (6 ft 1 in)
- Wing area: 10.70 m^{2} (115.2 sq ft)
- Aspect ratio: 5.0
- Airfoil: NACA23014
- Empty weight: 535 kg (1,179 lb) equipped
- Max takeoff weight: 700 kg (1,543 lb)
- Fuel capacity: 100 L (22 imp gal; 26 US gal)
- Powerplant: 1 × Lycoming AEIO-360 air-cooled, fuel injection flat-four engine, 150 kW (200 hp)
- Propellers: 2-bladed Whirl Wind 200C, variable pitch

Performance

- Maximum speed: 260 km/h (160 mph, 140 kn)
- Stall speed: 85 km/h (53 mph, 46 kn)
- Rate of climb: 7.0 m/s (1,380 ft/min) at sea level
- Take-off run: 100 m (330 ft)
