= Larsen Special II =

Type of aircraft

General information
- Type: Homebuilt aircraft
- National origin: Norway
- Designer: Carl Ludvig Larsen
- Number built: 1

History
- First flight: 1952

The Larsen Special II, is an early homebuilt aircraft that was designed and built in Norway. It was the first homebuilt aircraft to be issued a certificate of airworthiness in Norway.

== Design and development ==
Carl Ludvig Larsen was a decorated World War II pilot who produced his own aircraft design.

The Larsen Special II started as a single-seat low-wing, retractable tricycle gear aircraft. It is built of all-aluminium construction. It features 15 US gal (57 L) tip tanks and a swept tail. The wing uses a center-section split-flap.

== Operational history ==
The prototype was built in 1952, and test flown with engines ranging from 65 to 90 hp (48 to 67 kW) It was registered as LN-11. On 9 July 1955 the aircraft crashed at Fornebu and was rebuilt as the Larsen Special II, registered as LN LMI a two-seat aircraft powered by a 100 hp (75 kW) Continental O-200 engine. It crashed again in 1975 and 1982. The prototype is owned by the Norwegian Aviation Museum in Bodø, and is awaiting restoration.

== Specifications (Larsen Special II) ==
Data from Sport Aviation

General characteristics

- Capacity: one
- Length: 18 ft (5.5 m)
- Wingspan: 22 ft (6.7 m)
- Height: 7 ft 6 in (2.29 m)
- Airfoil: 23012 tapering to a 23008
- Empty weight: 527 lb (239 kg)
- Gross weight: 900 lb (408 kg)
- Powerplant: 1 × Continental C-90 , 90 hp (67 kW) (originally a Continental A-65)

Performance

- Maximum speed: 130 kn (150 mph, 240 km/h)
- Cruise speed: 120 kn (140 mph, 230 km/h)
- Range: 1,300 nmi (1,500 mi, 2,400 km)
