= LaBiche FSC-1 =

FSC-1

General information
- Type: Roadable aircraft
- Manufacturer: LaBiche
- Number built: 1

The LaBiche Aerospace FSC-1, a.k.a. LaBiche 460sc, is a prototype roadable aircraft.

== Design and development ==
The FSC-1 is claimed to be the first known vehicle capable of automatic conversion from aircraft to car at the touch of a button. LaBiche is currently testing the FSC-1 prototype #1 (as of Oct 2007). The FSC-1 requires a pilot and driver's license to operate. However, upon approval from the FAA, development is underway for utilizing a new satellite navigation "hands free" flight system to travel from airport to airport that will eliminate the need for a pilot's license. Numerous safety systems and fail safes are also employed on the FSC-1, such as a recovery parachute.

The "Flying Sports Car-1" FSC-1, developed and marketed by LaBiche Aerospace under the name FSC-1, is a 5-seat, single engine, integrated style flying car. The LaBiche FSC-1 was introduced as a roadable aircraft (flying car) to fulfill the needs of a personal vehicle that is capable of "true" high-speed, "door-to-door" travel, utilizing current automotive and aviation infrastructure.

== History ==
Development of the FSC-1 began in the late 1980s after Mitchell LaBiche, founder of LaBiche Aerospace, while on a typical cross-country trip in a light aircraft, became stranded for several days because of foul weather, when the weather was clear only 60 miles away yet there was no way to move the aircraft to the clear weather. This painful challenge stirred the designer to come up with a modern, flexible, and practical vehicle capable of true "door-to-door" travel.

The idea of flying cars (or roadable aircraft) had long been known. However, initial work centered on VTOL vehicles. After several years of research, market analysis, and customer surveys, the requirements for the FSC-1 were developed.

=== Model history ===
- 2002 – First announced
- 2007 – Initial market sales

=== Today ===
LaBiche Aerospace is now testing the full-scale prototype #1 (as of Oct 2007).

A Kickstarter failed to raise sufficient orders by August 28, 2014.

== Specifications LaBiche FSC-1 ==
General characteristics

- Length: 19 ft 0 in (5.79 m)
- Wingspan: 33 ft 4 in (10.16 m)
- Width: 6 ft 8 in (2.03 m) Car mode
- Height: 7 ft 10 in (2.38 m)

Car mode height4 ft 10 in (1.47 m)

- Empty weight: 2,502 lb (1,135 kg)
- Max takeoff weight: 3,807 lb (1,727 kg)
- Powerplant: 1 × General Motors LS-2 supercharged V-8, 451 hp (336 kW)
- Propellers: 2-bladed counter-rotating propellers

Performance

- Maximum speed: 261 kn (300 mph, 483 km/h)

Car mode max speed180 mph (290 km/h)

- Cruise speed: 225 kn (258 mph, 416 km/h)
- Take off speed: 63 kn (72 mph; 117 km/h)
- Minimum landing speeds: 60 kn (69 mph; 110 km/h)
- Range: 845 nmi (972 mi, 1,565 km)
- Service ceiling: 34,100 ft (10,400 m)
- Rate of climb: 2,640 ft/min (13.4 m/s)
- Minimum landing distance: 455 ft (139 m)
- Take off distance (rear wheel assist): 476 ft (145 m)
- Take off distance (Norminal): 1,231 ft (375 m)
