= Lanier Paraplane Commuter 110 =

Paraplane

General information
- Type: One or two seat STOL
- National origin: United States
- Designer: Edward H. Lanier
- Number built: 1

History
- First flight: 1958
- Developed from: Lanier Paraplane II

The 1958 Lanier Paraplane Commuter 110 or 110 Paraplane Commuter PL-8 was one of the last designs stemming from Edward H. Lanier's 1930s patents, and aircraft incorporating apertures in the upper surfaces, which claimed to give benefits in safety, lift and STOL ability.

== Design and development ==
In the early 1930s Edward H. Lanier published six US patents concerned with increased aircraft lift and stability, minimising the stall, sideslip and spin. This was to be achieved through vacuum chamber ("Vacua-cells"), initially in the upper fuselage but later in the upper wing, where the reduced pressure established by airflow over a curved surface would act on the lower surface inside the cell, providing lift. The second patent suggests that the cell should contain angled spanwise slats to prevent air entering them at low speeds and that these should be adjustable so that the cells could be closed when required. The earlier patents stress stability improvements; claims of enhanced lift begin with the fourth patent. Five Lanier Vacuaplanes were built in the 1930s, followed by three Paraplanes from about 1948, before the Paraplane Commuter 110 which first flew in 1958.

The Commuter 110 had a wing area of 111 sq ft (10.3 m^{2}), large for its 20 ft 7 in (6.28 m) span, and controllable air entrance slots ("Vacua-Jets") under the lower surface near its leading edge, passing air to the upper surface for boundary layer control. Other details of the upper surface are scarce but photographs appear to show rear hinged, single-piece slats over Vacua-cells as well as narrow open channels next to the fuselage in the very long wing root fairings. Structurally, the cantilever mid wing had strongly cranked inner sections and was tapered in plan with elliptical wing tips. The outer panels carried control surfaces which operated differentially as ailerons and together as flaps. In addition there were split flaps under the trailing edges of the wing roots.

The fuselage of the Commuter 110 was a semi-monocoque structure, flat-sided and tapering upwards markedly aft of the wing roots to the tail. The pilot sat in an enclosed cockpit long enough to contain a second seat in tandem, the canopy merging into the upper fuselage at its rear. One source describes the Commuter as a single seat aircraft, another as a one or two seater. The Commuter's empennage was conventional, with straight edged, square-tipped horizontal surfaces and a straight edged rudder with a trim tab mounted on a narrow fin with a fillet to the fuselage. There was a 150 hp (112 kW) Lycoming O-320 air-cooled flat-four engine in the nose, driving a two-blade propeller. It had a fixed conventional undercarriage with cantilever main legs mounted on the lower fuselage and a short-legged tailwheel on the sloping underside, about halfway between the edges of the root fairings and the extreme tail. The mainwheels had brakes and the tailwheel was steerable.

The Commuter made its first flight in 1958. Described as an STOL aircraft, it had respectable takeoff and landing characteristics, though no records comparing performance with open and closed Vacua-cells seems to have survived. A more recent study suggests the known figures were not exceptional given its thick wing, weight and power. Perhaps more significantly, the authors' computed aerodynamic investigations of open or slatted upper wing surfaces, though made at very low Reynolds numbers, show no evidence that Vacua-cells enhanced wing performance.

A side-by-side two-seat version, the Commuter 120 was under development in 1960-1964 though it may not have been completed.

== Specifications ==
Data from Jane's All the World's Aircraft 1960/1

General characteristics

- Crew: one
- Length: 21 ft 5 in (6.53 m)
- Wingspan: 20 ft 7 in (6.28 m)
- Wing area: 111.0 sq ft (10.31 m^{2})
- Aspect ratio: 3.8
- Empty weight: 780 lb (354 kg)
- Gross weight: 1,280 lb (581 kg) normal
- Max takeoff weight: 1,400 lb (635 kg) ferrying
- Fuel capacity: 24 US gal (20 Imp gal; 91 L) normal, in wing tanks; 44 US gal (37 Imp gal; 166 L) for ferrying
- Powerplant: 1 × Lycoming O-320 air-cooled flat four, 150 hp (110 kW)
- Propellers: 2-bladed McCauley, 6 ft 4 in (1.93 m) diameter metal, fixed pitch

Performance

- Maximum speed: 165 mph (266 km/h, 143 kn)
- Cruise speed: 151 mph (243 km/h, 131 kn)
- Range: 625 mi (1,006 km, 543 nmi) normal, with 45 min reserves
- Service ceiling: 23,000 ft (7,000 m)
- Rate of climb: 1,500 ft/min (7.6 m/s) or more, at sea level
- Take-off and landing speeds: less than 30 mph (48 km/h)
- Take-off and landing runs: 60 ft (18 m)
