= Levasseur PL.400 =

1930s French aircraft

PL.400

General information
- Type: Artillery observation / liaison
- National origin: France
- Manufacturer: Société Pierre Levasseur Aéronautique (Levasseur)
- Number built: 2

History
- First flight: 19 December 1939

The Levasseur PL.400 was an artillery observation / liaison aircraft built by Société Pierre Levasseur Aéronautique in the late 1930s.

The PL.400 was a high-wing monoplane of wood and metal construction. The aircraft first flew on December 19, 1939, but was later burned intentionally in June 1940 to avoid capture by German forces.

PL.400
The first prototype, powered by a 220 hp (160 kW) Potez 9C radial engine; one built.
PL.401
The second prototype, powered by a 220 hp (160 kW) Renault 6Q-09 in-line engine; completed but not flown before the French collapse in 1940.

== Specifications ==
Data from Aviafrance : Levasseur PL 400

General characteristics

- Crew: 2
- Length: 9.72 m (31 ft 11 in)
- Wingspan: 14 m (45 ft 11 in)
- Height: 2.9 m (9 ft 6 in)
- Wing area: 26 m^{2} (280 sq ft)
- Empty weight: 922 kg (2,033 lb)
- Gross weight: 1,290 kg (2,844 lb)
- Powerplant: 1 × Potez 9C 9-cylinder air-cooled radial piston engine, 160 kW (220 hp)

Performance

- Maximum speed: 202 km/h (126 mph, 109 kn) at sea level
- Range: 900 km (560 mi, 490 nmi)
- Service ceiling: 5,500 m (18,000 ft)
- Time to altitude: 2,000 m (6,600 ft) in 8 minutes 48 seconds

== See also ==
Related lists

- List of Interwar military aircraft
