= Leins Bal-Aire =

Bal-Aire

General information
- Type: Home designed and built single seat sports biplane
- National origin: United States
- Designer: Ballard Leins
- Number built: 1

History
- First flight: 8 July 1960

The Leins Bal-Aire was a US sports biplane designed and built by a professional pilot for his own use, completed in 1960.

== Design and development ==
The Bal-Aire was designed and built by Ballard Leins, a United Airlines pilot. He spent two years on its construction. It is a staggered biplane, with wings of constant chord mounted without sweep. They are wooden structures with fabric covering, the lower planes mounted on the lower fuselage longerons and the upper one supported over the fuselage on cabane struts. The pilot has an open cockpit just behind the upper trailing edge, in which there is a small cut-out to improve upward forward vision.

The rest of the Bal-Aire has a steel tube structure and fabric covering. A nose mounted, 150 hp (112 kW) Franklin 6A4-150 air-cooled flat six engine drives a two blade propeller. Behind it the fuselage is deep, with flat sides and bottom and a decked upper surface. The rear decking starts behind the cockpit at the height of the pilot's head, gradually falling to the tail. The fin is strongly straight tapered and square tipped, with a straight edged rudder that extends down to the keel; the tailplane is both strut and wire braced to the fin. The Bal-Aire has a fixed, conventional undercarriage with faired legs and main wheels and a steerable tailwheel.

The Bel-Aire first flew on 8 July 1960.

== Operational history ==
The Bal-Aire won second prize for outstanding workmanship at the Fly-in of the Experimental Aircraft Association.

It was restored to flight during the 1990s.

== Specifications ==
Data from Jane's All the World's Aircraft 1960/1

General characteristics

- Crew: One
- Length: 17 ft 6 in (5.33 m)
- Wingspan: 21 ft 0 in (6.40 m)
- Height: 6 ft 0 in (1.83 m)
- Empty weight: 750 lb (340 kg)
- Gross weight: 1,049 lb (476 kg)
- Powerplant: 1 × Franklin 6A4-150 air-cooled flat six, 150 hp (110 kW)

Performance

- Maximum speed: 105 mph (169 km/h, 91 kn)
- Cruise speed: 100 mph (160 km/h, 87 kn) 50 mph (43 kn; 80 km/h)
- Range: 125 mi (201 km, 109 nmi)
- Rate of climb: 2,000 ft/min (10 m/s) from sea level
- Landing speed: 50 mph (43 kn; 80 km/h)
- Landing run: 300 ft (91 m)
- Take-off run: 300 ft (91 m)
