= Lacey M-10 =

American homebuilt aircraft

M-10

General information
- Type: Homebuilt aircraft
- National origin: United States
- Designer: Joe Lacey

The Lacey M-10 is an American homebuilt aircraft that was designed to use simple construction techniques.

== Design and development ==
The Lacey M-10 was designed to have a minimum of rigging required for construction. The strutless, flat bottomed wing omits features such as washout, compound curves, dihedral and angle of incidence. Other than ailerons, the simple wing does not use flaps, leading edge slots or any other lift devices.

The M-10 is a cantilevered, high wing, conventional landing gear-equipped aircraft that seats two in tandem. The all-wood wing is able to pivot 90 degrees for trailering or storage. The pivot works by removing four bolts, using a jack to raise the wing a few inches for pivoting, then lowering the wing again, reattaching the bolts in the same pattern. The controls are mounted overhead. The front and rear occupant each have an individual door for entry on either side.

Although only two M-10s have been built, the simple construction of the flat-winged M-10 has resulted in it becoming a popular design for model aircraft competition.

== Operational history ==
In September 2014 at least one M-10 was still on the American Federal Aviation Administration aircraft registry.

== Variants ==
M-10
Initial model powered by a single Continental C-90 engine.
M-10C
A twin engine variant powered by two Volkswagen air-cooled engines on nose mounted pylons designed by Joseph Lacey and R. G. Muggins. Empty weight increased to roughly 100 lb (45 kg) to 740 lb (336 kg) in comparison to the single engine design, with a performance decrease to 100 mph (161 km/h) in cruise. The cabin can be converted into a sleeper for one person.

== Specifications (M-10) ==
Data from Air Trails, Plane & Pilot

General characteristics

- Crew: one
- Capacity: one
- Length: 20 ft (6.1 m)
- Wingspan: 20 ft (6.1 m)
- Wing area: 110 sq ft (10 m^{2})
- Empty weight: 638 lb (289 kg)
- Gross weight: 1,118 lb (507 kg)
- Fuel capacity: 20 U.S. gallons (76 L; 17 imp gal)
- Powerplant: 1 × Continental C90 horizontally opposed piston aircraft engine, 90 hp (67 kW)
- Propellers: 2-bladed

Performance

- Maximum speed: 120 kn (140 mph, 230 km/h)
- Cruise speed: 100 kn (120 mph, 190 km/h)
- Stall speed: 48 kn (55 mph, 89 km/h)
- Range: 380 nmi (440 mi, 710 km)
- Rate of climb: 1,000 ft/min (5.1 m/s)

== See also ==
Aircraft of comparable role, configuration, and era

- Wittman Tailwind
