= LFG V 8 Bärbel =

1920s German flying boat prototype

V 8 Bärbel

General information
- Type: Three seat passenger flying boat or trainer
- National origin: Germany
- Manufacturer: Luft-Fahrzeug-Gesellschaft (LFG)
- Designer: G. Baazt
- Number built: 1

History
- First flight: 1920-1

The LFG V 8 Bärbel (Barbel) in English) was a small, single-engined, biplane flying boat which carried two passengers. The sole example was built in Germany shortly after World War I but was exported and used for Baltic flights.

== Design and development ==
LFG's first post-World War I flying boat was the monoplane V 3 Susanna which appeared in 1919. In 1921 they built the V 8 Bärbel, a biplane, though again powered by a single Mercedes D.II engine in pusher configuration.

The Bärbel was a two bay biplane. Its lower wing was attached to the upper fuselage and the one piece upper wing was high above, the bays defined by parallel, vertical interplane struts between the wing spars. The equal span wings were mounted without stagger and with dihedral only on the lower one. Both had wooden structure and were fabric covered. They were almost rectangular in plan, though the tips were slightly angled and blunted. The upper wing carried short ailerons; though a general arrangement diagram shows these as overhung, photographs show no such balances.

Its Mercedes D.II engine was mounted between the wings on short struts from the upper fuselage; longer struts from its mounting supported the upper wing centre-section. Both trailing edges had central cut-outs for its two-bladed propeller.

The Bärbel had a rectangular cross-section fuselage with a flat planing bottom, its main step close to the centre of gravity under the wings. Behind it the rear fuselage had a narrower, V-section underside that ended at a second step midway between trailing edge and the tail. LFG had experimented with sponsons and then with a wide hull to provide stability on the water with the earlier V 3 and V 3a flying boats but the Bärbel had deep wingtip floats attached directly to the wing under the outer interplane struts. The pilot's open cockpit was near the nose and a second cockpit had a pair of side-by-side seats just forward of the lower wing leading edge. Dual control could be fitted for pilot training. Behind the first step the fuselage tapered in plan and profile, curving upwards to the tail. Fuselage, floats and the tail were made from duralumin.

All the tail surfaces were rectangular. Its fin, broader than high, carried the tailplane near its top, supported from below by a single strut on each side. Rudder and elevators were aerodynamically balanced.

== Operational history ==
Only the prototype is known to have been built. After its sale on 21 October 1920 to a Finn and LFG's receipt of an export permit in November, it was used for journeys around the Baltic. The sale date suggests the construction date of 1921 provided by Gütschow was a year late.

== Specifications ==
Data from Gütschow,1978

General characteristics

- Crew: one pilot
- Capacity: two passengers
- Length: 8.33 m (27 ft 4 in)
- Wingspan: 13.50 m (44 ft 3 in) upper and lower spans equal
- Empty weight: 870 kg (1,918 lb)
- Gross weight: 1,260 kg (2,778 lb)
- Powerplant: 1 × Mercedes D.II 6-cylinder, water-cooled, inline piston engine, 88 kW (118 hp) 120 PS
- Propellers: 2-bladed

Performance

- Maximum speed: 125 km/h (78 mph, 67 kn)
- Endurance: 3.5 hr
