= Laville DI-4 =

DI-4

General information
- Type: Fighter
- National origin: Soviet Union
- Designer: Henri Laville
- Number built: One

History
- First flight: 4 January 1932

The Laville DI-4 (Russian: Лавиль ДИ-4) was a prototype two-seat fighter aircraft developed in the Soviet Union in the 1930s. The chief designer Henri Laville was one of several French aviation specialists invited to work in the Soviet Union and not surprisingly the DI-4 layout was typical of the French trend at the time with the first high-mounted gull wing on a Soviet aircraft and all-metal construction.

The test flight program was completed in 1933 but despite good performance the aircraft did not enter mass production, in part because the Soviet Union had no plans to purchase the Curtiss V-1570 engine.

== Specifications (DI-4) ==
Data from Istoriia konstruktskii samoletov v SSSR do 1938

General characteristics

- Crew: 2
- Length: 8.5 m (27 ft 11 in)
- Wingspan: 13.3 m (43 ft 8 in)
- Wing area: 23.9 m^{2} (257 sq ft)
- Empty weight: 1,448 kg (3,192 lb)
- Gross weight: 1,949 kg (4,297 lb)
- Powerplant: × Curtiss V-1570 Conqueror V-12 liquid-cooled piston engine, 448 kW (601 hp)
- Propellers: 2-bladed fixed-pitch propeller

Performance

- Maximum speed: 266 km/h (165 mph, 144 kn)
- Range: 500 km (310 mi, 270 nmi)
- Service ceiling: 6,440 m (21,130 ft)
- Time to altitude: 5,000 m (16,000 ft) in 17 minutes
- Wing loading: 81.5 kg/m^{2} (16.7 lb/sq ft)
- Power/mass: 0.230 kW/kg (0.140 hp/lb)
- Horizontal turn time: 15 seconds

Armament

- Guns: 2× 7.62 mm (0.3 in) synchronized PV-1 machine guns and 2x 7.62 mm (0.3 in) turret-mounted DA machine guns

== Bibliography ==
- Kotelnikov, V.; Kulikov, V. & Cony, C. (December 2001). "Les avions français en URSS, 1921–1941" [French Aircraft in the USSR, 1921–1941]. Avions: Toute l'Aéronautique et son histoire (in French) (105): 50–56. ISSN 1243-8650.
