= Levasseur PL.200 =

1930s French observation seaplane

PL.200
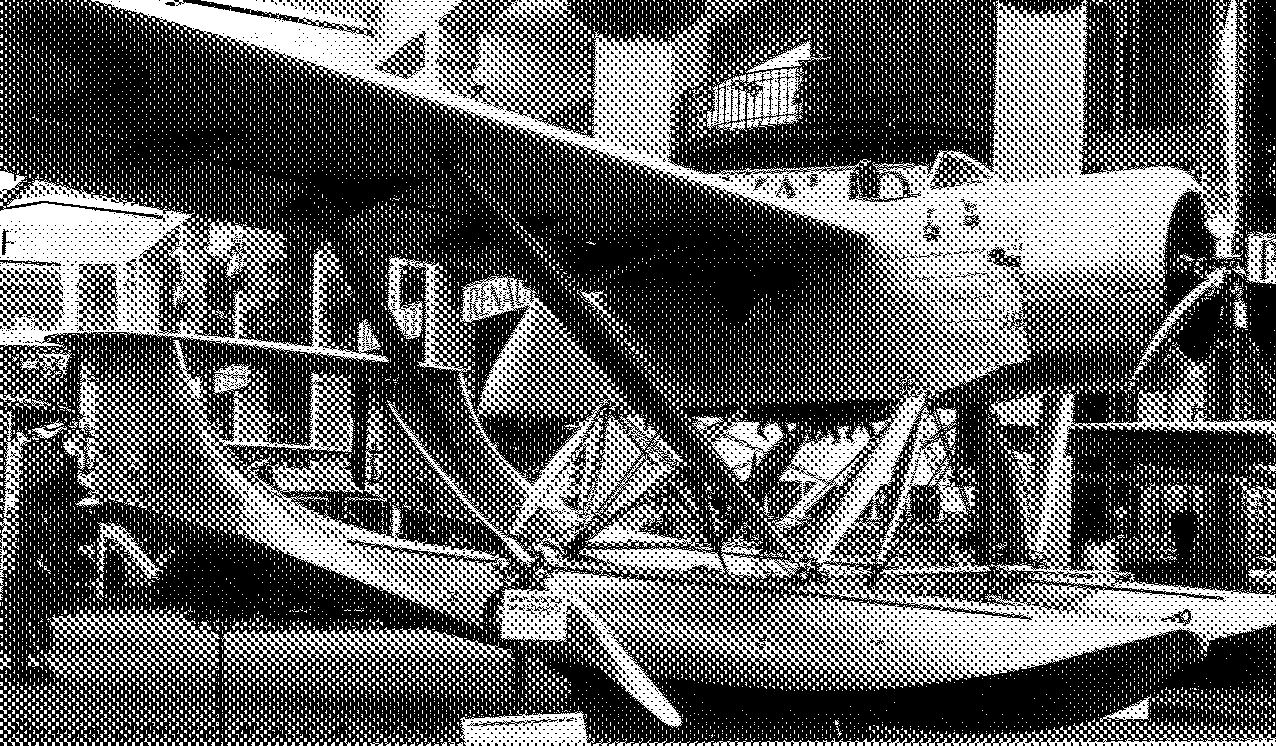
- The PL.200 at the Paris Salon d'Aéronautique

General information
- Type: Observation seaplane
- Manufacturer: Levasseur
- Number built: 1

History
- First flight: February 1935

The Levasseur PL.200 was an observation seaplane built by Levasseur in the mid-1930s. It was a high-wing monoplane with a short, all-metal fuselage nacelle at mid-span, and a wing made of metal.

== Design and development ==
The fuselage and wings were supported on struts above the two floats which extended rear-wards to form the tail unit with twinfins and rudders and single tailplane with elevator. The 720 hp (540 kW) Hispano-Suiza 9Vbrs engine was mounted as a tractor in the nose of the fuselage nacelle, which also housed the crew of three. An improved version was developed, with extended fins and a 740 hp (550 kW) Gnome & Rhône 9Kfr engine as the PL.201,

== Variants ==
PL.200
Initial observation seaplane, powered by a 720 hp (540 kW) Hispano-Suiza 9Vbrs engine.
PL.201
Improved version with extended fins, powered by a 740 hp (550 kW) Gnome & Rhône 9Kfr engine.

== Specifications ==
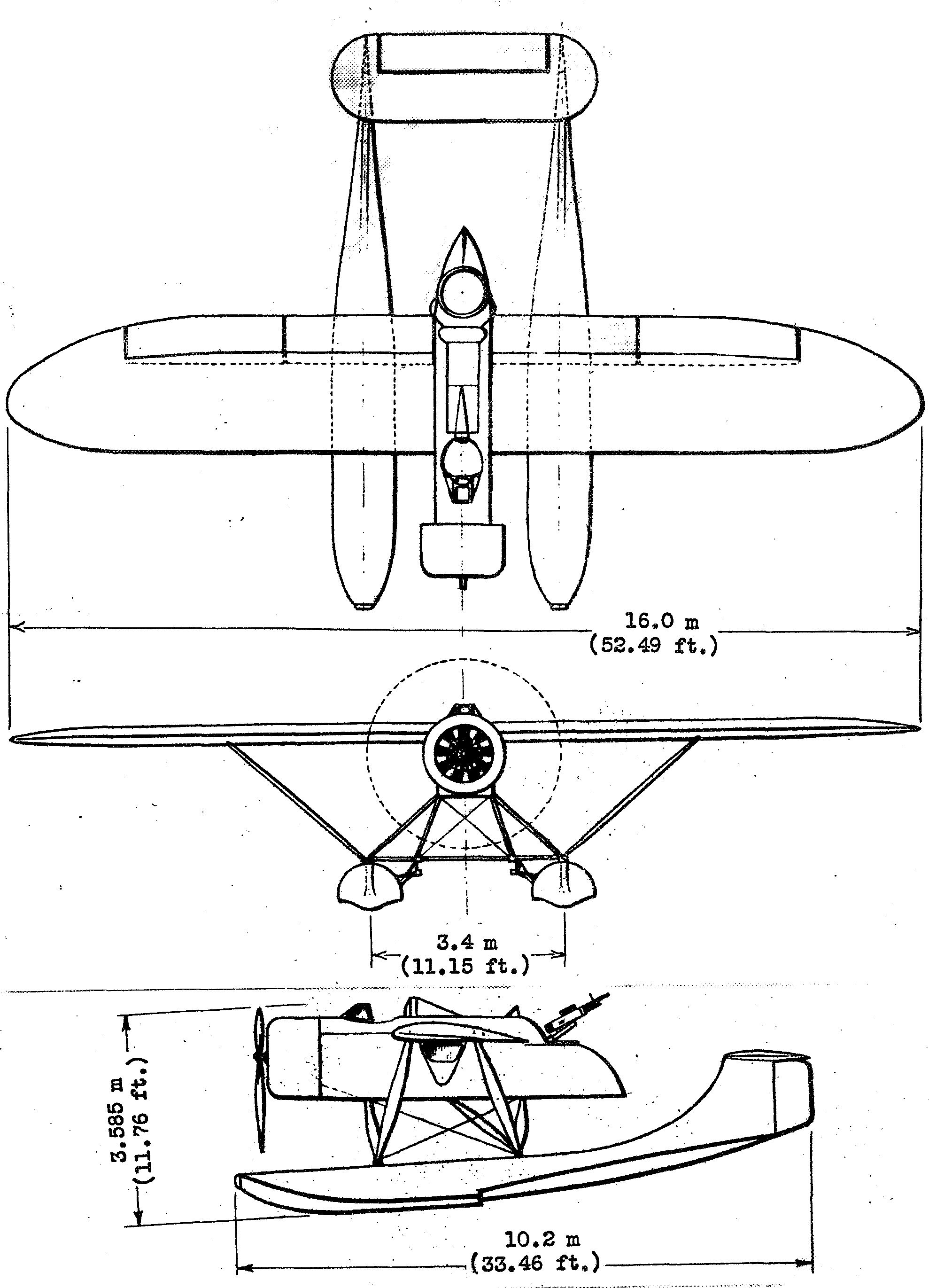
A 3-view of the PL.200

Data from

General characteristics

- Crew: three
- Length: 10.23 m (33 ft 7 in)
- Wingspan: 16.00 m (52 ft 6 in)
- Wing area: 35.00 m^{2} (376.7 sq ft)
- Empty weight: 1,760 kg (3,880 lb)
- Gross weight: 3,300 kg (7,275 lb)
- Powerplant: 1 × Hispano-Suiza 9Vbrs 9-cylinder air-cooled radial engine, 540 kW (720 hp)
- Propellers: 3-bladed variable pitch metal propeller

Performance

- Maximum speed: 225 km/h (140 mph, 121 kn)
- Range: 1,000 km (620 mi, 540 nmi)
- Service ceiling: 4,500 m (14,800 ft)

== Bibliography ==
- Bénichou, Michel (February 1985). "PL 200 et PL 201, Les Levasseur bifides" [PL 200 and PL 201: The Split Levasseurs]. Le Fane de l'Aviation (in French). No. 183. pp. 30–35.
