= Léger Aviation =

French aircraft manufacturer

SARL Léger Aviation
- Company type: Société à responsabilité limitée
- Industry: Aerospace
- Headquarters: Archiac, France
- Products: homebuilt aircraft plans and materials
- Website: sarllegeraviation.free.fr

SARL Léger Aviation was a French aircraft manufacturer based in Archiac. When it was in operation the company specialized in the design and manufacture of wooden ultralight aircraft in the form of plans for amateur construction. The company also supplied raw material for construction.

The company was a Société à responsabilité limitée.

Founded by father and son team Fabien and Jean Claude Léger the company produced plans and materials for two designs, the open cockpit Leger Pataplume 1 and the enclosed cockpit Leger Pataplume 2. Both aircraft emphasized simplicity and ease of construction and were marketed with the French slogan "simplicite, economie, amusement".

By 2013 the company website had been removed and the plans were apparently no longer available.

== Aircraft ==
Summary of aircraft built by Léger Aviation
Model name	First flight	Number built	Type
Leger Pataplume 1			Two-seat open cockpit homebuilt aircraft
Leger Pataplume 2			Two-seat enclosed cockpit homebuilt aircraft
