= Lammer Geyer Jupiter =

Jupiter

General information
- Type: Four-seat homebuilt cabin monoplane
- National origin: South Africa
- Manufacturer: Lammer Geyer Aviation
- Designer: Peter Wareham

History
- First flight: 1 December 2002

The Lammer Geyer Jupiter is a South African four-seat cabin monoplane designed by Lammer Geyer Aviation for sale as a kit for amateur construction.

== Design and development ==
Design on the Jupiter started in 1996 and the prototype, registered ZU-CNH first flew on 1 December 2002. The Jupiter is an all-composite low-wing cantilever monoplane with a fixed tricycle landing gear.

The prototype is powered by a 210 hp (157 kW) Continental IO-360 flat-six engine with a three-bladed tractor propeller. The cabin has room for four seated side-by-side in two rows.

== Specifications (prototype) ==
Data from Jane's All the World's Aircraft 2004-2005

General characteristics

- Crew: one
- Capacity: three
- Length: 7.25 m (23 ft 9.5 in)
- Wingspan: 9.80 m (32 ft 1.75 in)
- Height: 2.36 m (7 ft 9 in)
- Wing area: 15.50 m^{2} (166.8 sq ft)
- Aspect ratio: 6.2
- Empty weight: 560 kg (1,235 lb)
- Gross weight: 1,025 kg (2,259 lb)
- Powerplant: 1 × Continental IO-360 flat-six , 157 kW (210 hp)

Performance

- Maximum speed: 281 km/h (175 mph, 152 kn)
- Cruise speed: 253 km/h (157 mph, 136 kn)
- Stall speed: 80 km/h (50 mph, 43 kn)
- Range: 2,000 km (1,242 mi, 1,079 nmi)
- Service ceiling: 8,230 m (27,000 ft)
- g limits: +6/-3.5
- Rate of climb: 10.0 m/s (1,970 ft/min)
