= Lada Land VM-01 =

Soviet light utility helicopter

VM-01

General information
- Type: Light utility helicopter
- Manufacturer: Lada Land
- Number built: 1

History
- First flight: May 2001

The VM-01 (Russian: ВМ-01) is a light helicopter from the Lada Land (Russian: Лада Лэнд) company in Tolyatti, Russia. The design was created privately by the company, but production was assisted by OKB Mil and Kamov.

== Design ==
The aircraft contains a rotary-piston engine, four-bladed main rotor, two-bladed tail rotor, skid undercarriage, titanium alloys in the construction of the load system, and composite materials in the fuselage construction. The first flight was in May, 2001.

== Specifications ==
General characteristics

- Crew: 1
- Capacity: 2 (1 pilot + 1 passenger)
- Max takeoff weight: 830 kg (1,830 lb)
- Powerplant: 1 × PD VAZ-413 rotary piston engine, 112 kW (150 hp)
- Main rotor diameter: 9 m (29 ft 6 in)

Performance

- Cruise speed: 140 km/h (87 mph, 76 kn)
- Range: 330 km (210 mi, 180 nmi)
- Service ceiling: 3,000 m (9,800 ft)
- Rate of climb: 4 m/s (790 ft/min)
