= Lacroix-Trussant LT-51 =

LT-51 Microplan

General information
- Type: Two seat sports aircraft
- National origin: France
- Manufacturer: Gérard Trussant
- Designer: Léon Lacroix
- Number built: 1

History
- First flight: 25 June 1939

The Lacroix-Trussant L.T.-51 Microplan was a French, low-powered, two seat amateur-built biplane. It flew just before the outbreak of World War II. After the war it was re-engined and flew until 1953.

== Design and development ==
In 1935 Léon Lacroix built, in collaboration with Gérard Trussant, a Mignet Pou-de-Ciel. He then joined with Barrat de Nazaris to design and construct three Pou types and a very small, single seat biplane, the LN-3, named the Microplan. After crashing the latter, de Nazaris decided to leave light aircraft design and Lacroix rejoined Trussant to design and build another biplane, the LT-51 which, with de Nazaris' blessing, inherited the Microplan name. Though another small biplane, the LT-51 was a two-seater with over twice the wing area of its predecessor.

It was a single bay biplane with approximately equal span, rectangular plan wings mounted with dihedral only on the lower wing and with marked stagger, so that the single interplane strut on each wing leant forward strongly. These struts had airfoil sections and had extended, faired heads and feet. Inverted-V cabane struts linked the upper wing centre section to the upper fuselage. Long ailerons were fitted only on the lower wing.

The Microplan was powered by a geared-down 24 kW (32 hp) Lefèvre flat twin engine mounted in the nose with its cylinders projecting for cooling. Behind the nose the fuselage was flat sided with deep, rounded upper decking. Its single, open cockpit was under the trailing edge of the wing and behind it narrowed to the tail. This was conventional, with a tapered, round tipped tailplane and elevators mounted on top of the fuselage. It had a tall, straight edged and round tipped fin and rudder, the latter reaching down to the keel and moving in an elevator cut-out.

The biplane had conventional landing gear with each independently mounted mainwheel attached to faired V-struts and to a single long faired strut to the upper fuselage; there was a long tailskid.

Its first flight was from Agen on 25 June 1939, piloted by Sauret. In September 1939 it was scheduled to take part in a light aircraft rally at Cahors, piloted by Trussant, which, given international developments, may not have taken place. Hidden, the Microplan survived the war and was re-engined by Frantz Trussant with a more powerful 30 kW (40 hp) Volkswagen engine in a modified nose, making its first flight on 5 August 1948. In July 1949 it was registered as F-WFKQ in the name of de Nazaris, passing after his death in 1952 to his widow; it was involved in an accident at Biscarosse in March 1953 and de-registered but went on to fly in Spain. It is currently stored, though not on display, at the Musée de l'Aviation Légère (Museum of Light Aviation) near Revel, Haute-Garonne.

== Specifications ==
Data from Les Ailes July 1939

General characteristics

- Crew: One
- Capacity: One passenger
- Length: 4.55 m (14 ft 11 in)
- Wingspan: 6 m (19 ft 8 in)
- Wing area: 8.5 m^{2} (91 sq ft)
- Airfoil: NACA 23012
- Empty weight: 155 kg (342 lb)
- Powerplant: 1 × Lefèvre flat twin 750 cc (46 cu in) capacity, 24 kW (32 hp) at engine speed of 3,525 rpm, geared down 2:1
- Propellers: 2-bladed

Performance

- Maximum speed: 145 km/h (90 mph, 78 kn)
- Cruise speed: 120 km/h (75 mph, 65 kn) at 3,000 rpm
