= Langley Twin =

2-4 Twin

General information
- Type: Utility aircraft
- National origin: United States
- Manufacturer: Langley
- Designer: Arthur Draper and Martin Jensen
- Number built: 2

History
- First flight: 1940

The Langley 2-4, variously described as the Langley Monoplane or Langley Twin was a twin-engine utility aircraft built in the United States in 1940. Named in honour of Samuel Pierpont Langley, the aircraft was designed to make use of non-strategic materials in its construction and thereby avoid any shortages brought about by war. Its design was conventional - a low-wing cantilever monoplane with twin tails and tailwheel undercarriage. The manufacturing process, however, was unorthodox, and the aircraft's structures were built up from mahogany veneers bent over moulds and impregnated with vinyl and phenol resins to make them hold their shape. The use of metal for structural elements - even in fasteners - was thereby almost completely avoided.

Two prototypes were constructed, one with 65 hp (49 kW) engines, and another with 90 hp (67 kW) engines. The second machine was purchased by the United States Navy and evaluated as the XNL-1, but the navy did not order the type. Once the United States entered the war, it transpired that the resins needed for construction were in far shorter supply than the metal that would have been needed to produce an aircraft by conventional means, and the project was abandoned. The XNL-1 was sold as war surplus, and, following an accident in 1965, its wings, engine nacelles, and main undercarriage were mated to a Stinson 108 fuselage to create a one-of-a-kind homebuilt aircraft named the Pierce Arrow.

== Specifications (2-4-90) ==
Data from U.S. Civil Aircraft Vol. 8

General characteristics

- Crew: one pilot
- Capacity: three passengers
- Length: 20 ft 8 in (6.30 m)
- Wingspan: 35 ft 2 in (10.72 m)
- Height: 7 ft 2 in (2.18 m)
- Wing area: 171.4 sq ft (15.92 m^{2})
- Empty weight: 1,565 lb (710 kg)
- Gross weight: 2,550 lb (1,157 kg)
- Fuel capacity: 40 US gal (33 imp gal; 150 L)
- Powerplant: 2 × Franklin 4AC-199-E3 air-cooled flat-four, 90 hp (67 kW) each

Performance

- Maximum speed: 140 mph (230 km/h, 120 kn)
- Cruise speed: 120 mph (190 km/h, 100 kn) (75% power)
- Range: 400 mi (640 km, 350 nmi)
- Service ceiling: 14,000 ft (4,300 m)
- Rate of climb: 720 ft/min (3.7 m/s)

== Bibliography ==
- Juptner, Joseph P. (1980). U.S. Civil Aircraft Vol. 8 (ATC 701 –ATC 800). Fallbrook, California, US: Aero Publishers, Inc. ISBN 0-8168-9178-8.
- "Post-War "Family" Aircraft". Flight. 30 October 1941.
- Taylor, Michael J. H. (1989). Jane's Encyclopedia of Aviation. London: Studio Editions. p. 564.
- "Without Priority". Flight. 8 January 1942.
- aerofiles.com
