= Leger Pataplume 1 =

French homebuilt aircraft

Pataplume 1

General information
- Type: Amateur-built aircraft
- National origin: France
- Manufacturer: Leger Aviation
- Status: Plans no longer available (2013)

History
- Variant: Leger Pataplume 2

The Leger Pataplume 1 is a French amateur-built aircraft, designed by Leger Aviation of Archiac and made available in the form of plans for amateur construction. The aircraft's design goals are simplicity and economy of construction with low operating costs.

When it was available the aircraft was marketed with the French slogan "simplicite, economie, amusement".

By 2013 the company website had been removed and the plans were apparently no longer available.

== Design and development ==
The Pataplume 1 features a strut-braced mid-wing, a two-seats-in-tandem open cockpit with a windshield, fixed conventional landing gear and a single engine in tractor configuration.

The aircraft is made from wood and finished with doped aircraft fabric. Its 10 m (32.8 ft) span wing has an area of 16.5 m^{2} (178 sq ft) and is supported by two parallel struts per wing. The recommended engine is a 45 hp (34 kW) 1600 cc Volkswagen air-cooled engine four-stroke powerplant.

While there were no kits supplied for the design, Leger Aviation did supply all needed raw materials.

== Specifications (Pataplume 1) ==
Data from Bayerl and Leger Aviation

General characteristics

- Crew: one
- Capacity: one passenger
- Length: 6.00 m (19 ft 8 in)
- Wingspan: 10 m (32 ft 10 in)
- Wing area: 16.5 m^{2} (178 sq ft)
- Empty weight: 190 kg (419 lb)
- Gross weight: 370 kg (816 lb)
- Fuel capacity: 40 litres (8.8 imp gal; 11 US gal)
- Powerplant: 1 × Volkswagen air-cooled engine 1600 cc, four cylinder, air-cooled, four stroke automotive conversion, 34 kW (45 hp)
- Propellers: 2-bladed wooden

Performance

- Maximum speed: 130 km/h (81 mph, 70 kn)
- Cruise speed: 120 km/h (75 mph, 65 kn)
- Stall speed: 60 km/h (37 mph, 32 kn)
- Never exceed speed: 140 km/h (87 mph, 76 kn)
- Maximum glide ratio: 9:1 at 80 km/h
- Rate of climb: 3 m/s (590 ft/min)
- Wing loading: 22.4 kg/m^{2} (4.6 lb/sq ft)
