= Louis Langhurst =

American engineer and inventor (1907–1995)

Louis Francis Langhurst (22 January 1907 – 17 May 1995) was an American engineer and inventor. Born in Cedar Rapids, Iowa, he is best known for building a 7/10-scale flying replica of Germany's feared Junkers Ju 87 "Stuka" dive-bomber.

== Career ==
Louis Langhurst spent over 35 years building and designing equipment for the extraction of useful oils from soybeans, nuts and other vegetables and held several patents for cracking and flaking machines built specifically for this purpose. Though possessing only a high school education, he became largely self-taught in mechanical, chemical, structural and aeronautical engineering. He sought to enlist during WWII but was turned down as his work with strategically valuable raw materials was considered more important to the war effort than his direct participation in the armed forces. He did obtain a pilot's license in 1944, however. Langhurst owned several different aircraft in later years, including a Luscombe, BT-13 Vultee Valiant, North American AT-6 Texan and a Stinson SR-10 Reliant. In 1967-68 he built a Smith Miniplane and rebuilt a Mooney Mite in 1970.

== Birth of an idea ==
In 1970, while living on a 70-acre farm in Carriere, Mississippi, Louis Langhurst first got the idea of building a replica Junkers Ju 87 Stuka, a two-seat monoplane dive-bomber used by Germany's Luftwaffe (Air Force) during WWII. Langhurst patterned his replica on the Ju 87B-2, as this version was in production at the outbreak of WWII and constituted the largest number of all Stukas built during the war.

With no original plans available, Langhurst spent the next three years gathering and studying research materials on the aircraft and making the necessary aerodynamic calculations in order to draft plans for a 7/10th scaled-down version. Only two original and intact Ju 87 Stukas existed in the world. One, a Ju 87D model, was on display at the Royal Air Force Museum in Hendon, England. The other, a Ju 87B of the type Langhurst wanted to build, was owned by the Chicago Museum of Science and Industry. At this time, the latter Stuka was on loan to the EAA Air Museum in Franklin, WI for restoration as it had been damaged in Chicago while being lowered from the ceiling for cleaning. Langhurst made several trips to the EAA Museum in Wisconsin, taking numerous detailed photos and measurements of the plane. From these he developed 3-view drawings.

By April 1973, Langhurst had enough drawings completed to actually begin cutting metal. He opted for all-metal construction based on the parameters he had set for the scale replica and also because he felt his metal-working skills were superior to those he had working with wood. Framing was steel tubing with .020 and .025 2024-T3 aluminum skinning on the wings, fuselage and tail surfaces. Langhurst selected a standard NACA 2415 airfoil for the wing ribbing as it closely hewed to the original Stuka rib type. Where compound curves were necessary, such as the engine cowling and wheel spats, he fabricated parts from fiberglass.

The original Stuka dive-bomber had fixed, rather than retractable, landing gear and this greatly simplified Langhurst's choice of a substitute. He installed the landing gear and tail wheel salvaged from a Fairchild PT-19 training plane. It mattered little that these did not exactly resemble the originals as the main wheels on a Stuka were normally covered with streamlined metal spats. Langhurst would later fashion similarly shaped spats out of fiberglass. He also utilized the PT-19's control stick and linkages for the control surfaces on his Stuka.

Langhurst constructed his Stuka's sliding three-section "greenhouse" crew canopy from 1/2"-square 4130 tubing and 1/16" Plexiglas, covering it with aluminum strips. The plane's three-bladed fixed-pitch wooden propeller was fashioned by Ted Hendrickson who specialized in creating custom-made props.

Because Langhurst's Stuka was scaled down from the original, he ran into what he termed "scaling effects", changes that occur in aerodynamic performance, handling and center-of-gravity (CG) due to differences in overall weight and the reduced surface area of the wings and control surfaces. This necessitated deviating in some instances from the shape of the original Ju 87, most notably a visibly shorter rear fuselage length.

Langhurst initially housed his Stuka project in a shed on his farm but later built a proper hangar for the plane once it outgrew this space. He also applied for and was granted permission to clear a 1,700-ft grass airstrip on his property from which to fly the completed aircraft. By his own estimation, Langhurst spent 8,000 man-hours working on his Stuka.

After much consideration, Langhurst painted the aircraft in the same scheme and unit markings as that of Germany's most highly decorated Stuka pilot, Oberst Hans-Ulrich Rudel, who commanded III Gruppe/Stuka Geschwader 2 Immelman (III./StG2) on the Eastern Front during WWII. The plane was assigned the official FAA registration tail code N87LL and sports the registration code T6+AD along the fuselage.

== Flight Testing ==
By July 1978, Langhurst's replica Stuka was complete and ready for flight testing. Following an inspection of the aircraft, the FAA agent in Jackson Mississippi issued temporary airworthiness papers so that testing could begin. Initially the plane's wheel pants, dive brakes, machine guns and dummy center line-mounted bomb were left off so as to conduct testing of the aircraft in a "clean" condition. Later in the program, these items were individually added back on to determine how they affected the plane's overall handling characteristics.

Among the initial problems encountered with the aircraft were flight controls out of adjustment, inadequate braking action and shimmying of the tail wheel. None of these posed any serious impediments to the aircraft's basic aerodynamic performance, however, and all were eventually corrected. A flight accident occurred when one of the test pilots applied the brakes too hard upon landing, tipping the aircraft nose first and wrecking the plane's propeller. Langhurst had to wait eight months for the manufacture of a new custom-made propeller.

By July 1979 the flight testing and necessary flying time were finished and the FAA lifted the temporary restrictions. Langhurst had long planned on taking the plane to the annual EAA Fly-In at Oshkosh, WI and, with his friend Col. Reggie Braddock at the controls and Langhurst occupying the backwards-facing rear gunner's seat, made the 900 mile trip that summer. Langhurst had attended the Fly-In for the past 15 years but this was the first time he had his own home-built aircraft to bring along.

In talking over the Ju 87 Stuka's actual flight characteristics with several former Luftwaffe pilots who had flown them during the war, Langhurst felt his replica shared many similarities, chiefly the quick responsiveness of the controls, the need to "…fly the airplane all the time you are in it" and the ability to land it three point or on two wheels with equal ease. In November 1980, legendary Stuka pilot Hans-Ulrich Rudel, in company with his wife Ursula, appeared on Langhurst's doorstep in Mississippi, wishing to see and possibly fly in Langhurst's replica. Though Langhurst's pilot's medical certificate had been revoked by the FAA due to a kidney operation and he could no longer legally fly an airplane, Langhurst obligingly rolled his Stuka out from its hangar. Rudel clambered into the rear gunner's seat while Langhurst turned over the engine and the two took off together to put the plane through its paces, including a steep dive aimed at the grass airfield. Afterwards, Rudel declared, "It is handling exactly as the real Stuka, only how nice to fly one and not be shot at!".

== Ownership history ==
In 1981, after 175 hours of flight time, Langhurst loaned his home-built Stuka to the San Diego Aerospace Museum (now the San Diego Air and Space Museum) where it was placed on display for the next ten years. When the museum declined an offer to purchase the plane for its permanent collection, Langhurst listed it in the publication Trade-A-Plane and sold the aircraft to newspaper editor Roland Weeks of Biloxi, Mississippi. In 2002, Weeks sold the plane to Mitch Sammons of Augusta, Maine where the plane was a frequent performer at local air shows. In 2018, Mitch Sammons donated the Langhurst Stuka to the Big Easy Wing of the Commemorative Air Force (CAF) where it now resides at Lakefront Airport in New Orleans, Louisiana.

== Other Stuka replicas ==
A second flyable Stuka replica, also 7/10-scale, was completed by Richard H. Kurzenberger of Horseheads, NY in 1987. Kurzenberger had seen Langhurst's Stuka at the EAA Fly-In in Oshkosh, WI in 1979 and talked with him about the plane. Langhurst had no plans to share but simply offered these words of advice: "If you are a builder, you know what to do." Kurzenberger snapped a picture of Langhurst's Stuka and studied it for three months. He then began making sketches and finally produced a scaled-up 3-D drawing to work from.

Upon Kurzenberger's retirement in 1983 at age 65, he started work on his replica. Like Langhurst, Kurzenberger purchased a junked PT-19 fuselage, mainly to use its fixed landing gear but also to salvage any usable 4130 Chromalloy tubing and re-use the control linkages and rod ends which had stainless steel needle bearings and would give the replica Stuka's flight controls a smoother feel. Kurzenberger also acquired a Lycoming GO-435 C model aero engine through a publication called Trade-A-Plane. It came complete with a three-blade constant speed propeller. Kurzenberger simplified some of the forms on his Stuka, especially around the nose of the plane, so it did not adhere as faithfully as Langhurst's to the original Ju 87 dive-bomber's lines. He also chose to omit the swastika emblems on the tail. In overall appearance, however, there was no mistaking what historical plane it represented.

In July 1986, Kurzenberger took his Stuka up on its first test flight. It was given the FAA registration code N87DK and sported the fuselage registration code T6+KL. Kurzenberger received an FAA-issued certificate of airworthiness in 1987. He kept the plane stored in nearby Elmira, NY for the next twelve years until he sold it in 2000 with an accrued flight time of 359 hours. The new owner's father, Amos Faux-Burhans, making his first familiarization flight in the aircraft, crashed upon take-off from the Faux-Burhans Airport in Urbana, Maryland on 26 May 2000 and died from his injuries. His son had purchased the plane just two weeks earlier. The aircraft was so badly damaged from both the crash impact and subsequent fire that it was written off.

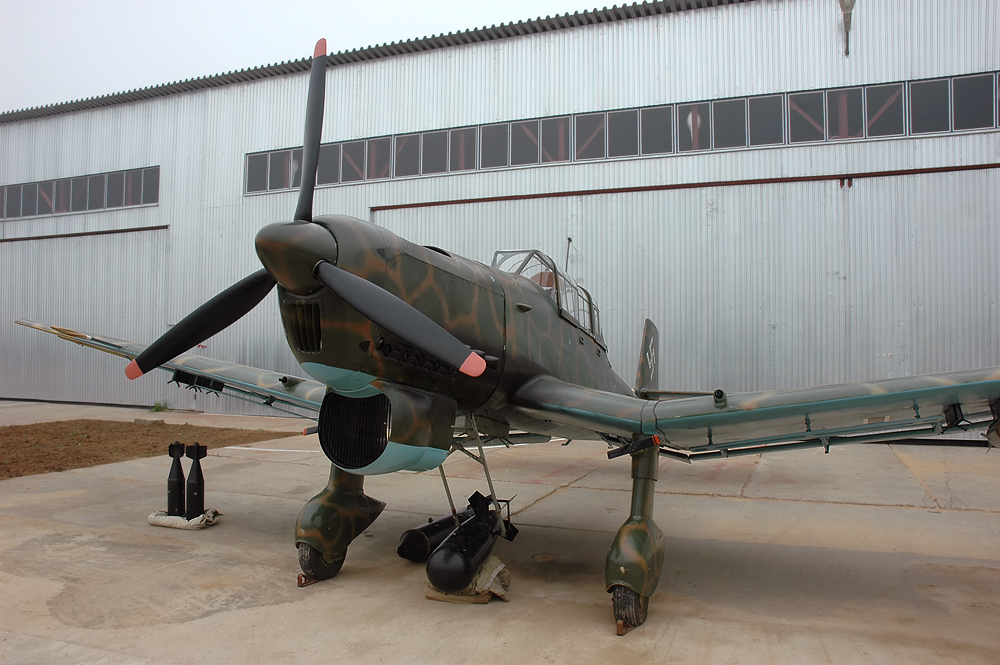
Vladimir Nesonov's 3/4-scale Stuka on display at the Central Air Force Museum outside Moscow.

Vladimir Nesonov, a retired Ukrainian army pilot, built a 3/4-scale replica Stuka from scrap and powered it with a four-cylinder engine. He flew it for the first time in June 2002 at an airfield in Dzhankoi, Ukraine. The plane is currently on exhibit at the Central Air Force Museum at Monino Airfield, just east of Moscow.

As of 2016, Jeff Willoughby was still working on a 5/8-scale Stuka replica in Pennsylvania, a project he began in 2003. Construction is primarily wood with an aluminum main spar and aluminum skinning for the wings and fuselage. The plane will be powered by a 110 hp converted Corvair automobile engine.

A fifth replica Stuka, similar to Jeff Willoughby's in scale and engine size, was under construction in Serbia as of 2011 but currently remains unfinished.

== Langhurst Stuka specification ==
Data from Military Aircraft Replicas: A New Era in Flight

General characteristics

- Crew: 2
- Length: 24 ft 0 in (7.32 m)
- Wingspan: 32 ft 6 in (9.91 m)
- Height: 7 ft 6 in (2.29 m)
- Wing area: 164 sq ft (15.2 m^{2})
- Empty weight: 1,680 lb (762 kg)
- Gross weight: 2,275 lb (1,032 kg)
- Powerplant: 1 × Lycoming GO-435-B 6-cylinder air-cooled horizontally-opposed piston engine, 220 hp (160 kW)
- Propellers: 3-bladed constant-speed wooden propeller

Performance

- Maximum speed: 119 kn (137 mph, 220 km/h)
- Rate of climb: 1,100 ft/min (5.6 m/s)
- Wing loading: 13.8 lb/sq ft (67 kg/m^{2})

Armament

- Guns:
  - 2× 7.92 mm (0.312 in) dummy machine guns in wings
  - 1× 7.92 mm (0.312 in) dummy machine gun on flexible mount, rear cockpit
- Bombs:
  - 250 kg (551 lb) dummy bomb mounted along center line of fuselage
  - 4× 50 kg (110 lb) dummy bombs mounted near wingtips

== Bibliography ==
- Kurzenberger, Richard H. (2003). The Exciting Life of an Emigre. Trafford Publishing.
- Langhurst, Louis F. (August 1974). "7/10 Stuka Project Report". Sport Aviation.
- Langhurst, Louis F. (December 1975). "Stuka Project Update". Sport Aviation.
- Langhurst, Louis F. (October 1979). "Stuka Over Oshkosh!". Sport Aviation.
- Langhurst, Louis F. (1983). Military Aircraft Replicas: A New Era in Flight. Lourene Ventures.
- Sammons, Mitch (March 2008). "The Langhurst Stuka". Warbirds. Vol. 31, no. 2.
- Simmons, Thomas E. (May 1990). "One Last Flight Over Pickle Ridge". Mississippi Magazine.
