= Lanzius L II =

L II

General information
- Type: Fighter
- National origin: United States
- Manufacturer: Lanzius Aircraft Co, New York NY.
- Designer: George Lanzius
- Number built: 6

History
- Developed from: Lanzius L I (Variable Speed Aeroplane)

The Lanzius L II was a single-seat fighter designed and built in the United States around 1918. The sole prototype is believed to have been tested at McCook Field.

== Design and development ==
George Lanzius, an immigrant from Holland, founded the Lanzius Aircraft Company in New York, to develop his inventions for variable-camber and variable-incidence wings. Lanzius first designed and built a two-seat aircraft under a US Signal Corps contract in 1917, named the Lanzius Variable Speed Aeroplane (aka L I). His second aircraft, the L II, was a single-seater derived from the L I also featuring the cable operated variable-camber and incidence.

The two-bay wings had external trusses over the upper main-spars and under the lower main spars and the variable-camber and incidence were operated by cables and pulleys, with incidence variable from 0° to +15°. Power was supplied by a variety of engines but principally by a 350 hp (260 kW) Packard 1A-1237 V-12 in-line water-cooled engine. During a test flight the engine failed and the L II crashed. Meanwhile, in April 1918, four similar aircraft were ordered, powered by 400 hp (300 kW) Liberty L-12 water-cooled V-12 engines. The first of these was destroyed after a structural failure in flight killed Lanzius test pilot Lester E. Holt. The United States Army Air Service (USAS) rejected the remaining three aircraft and returned them to Lanzius.

== Variants ==
Lanzius Variable Speed Aeroplane (1917)
(L I) A two-seater built to a US Signal Corps contract in 1917, incorporating Lanzius' variable camber and incidence systemand powered by a 140 hp (100 kW) Duesenberg 4-cylinder water-cooled inline engine.
Lanzius L II
A prototype single-seater fighting scout, powered by a 350 hp (260 kW) Packard 1A-1237 V-12 water-cooled engine.
Lanzuius Variable Speed Aeroplane (1918)
Four aircraft similar to the L II, but powered by 400 hp (300 kW) Liberty L-12 engines.

== Specifications (L II) ==
Data from The Complete Book of Fighters

General characteristics

- Crew: 1
- Length: 7.62 m (25 ft 0 in)
- Wingspan: 11.58 m (38 ft 0 in)
- Gross weight: 544 kg (1,200 lb)
- Powerplant: 1 × Packard 1A-1237 V-12 water-cooled in-line piston engine, 260 kW (350 hp)

Performance
