= Langlois JL.2 =

French agricultural aircraft

General information
- Type: Single seat, triple wing sports aircraft
- National origin: France
- Designer: Jacques Langlois

History
- First flight: August 1979

The Langlois JL.2 was a three-winged agricultural aircraft built in France in 1979. It failed to sell and only one was built.

== Design and development ==
The Langlois JL.2 was an unusually laid out three wing aircraft, not a conventional triplane but a tandem wing design of the Mignet Pou-du-Ciel type with an extra forward low wing. The upper front and rear wings had the same span but the lower one was both shorter and of narrower chord. Its function was to stabilize the pendulum mode oscillations to which the tandem wing design was prone. Langlois intended it to be a fertilizer spreader, or crop duster, calling for robust construction and a more powerful engine than in most Mignet style aircraft.

All three wings were simple parallel chord, square tipped cantilever structures. The stabilizing wing was mounted on the lower fuselage longerons and the rear wing on the upper rear fuselage. The upper wing was pivoted high over the fuselage; on each side on a pair of inverted V-struts from the upper fuselage and a single, forward strut from below met at a pivot point. The JL.2 was controlled, like all Mignet type designs, by changing the wing incidence. This was done through two links connecting the rear of the wing and the control column. There were no ailerons.

The fuselage was a simple flat sided construction except at the nose, where a 134 kW (180 hp) Lycoming O-360-A2A air-cooled flat four engine was smoothly cowled. Immediately behind the engine was a hopper for the fertilizer. This was filled from above and discharged sideways, below the fuselage, via two side-by-side, vertical, narrowing ducts which fed spreaders with deflector plates on top. These structures were braced with struts from a frame under the nose. The pilot sat high in the cockpit at the leading edge of the rear wing under a perspex canopy with minimal obstruction. The fin was triangular and the unbalanced rudder rectangular. The JL.2 had a fixed tailwheel undercarriage, with main wheels on cantilever legs. A tailwheel with a long leg kept the tail high off the ground.

The JL.2 first flew in August 1979 and received its Certificate of Airworthiness on 29 January 1980. However, there was little call in France for such an agricultural aircraft, so when the certificate expired the following January it was not renewed and the aircraft was abandoned at Mortagne. It had flown 102 hours.

== Specifications ==
Data from Gaillard (1991), p.179

General characteristics

- Crew: one
- Length: 6.07 m (19 ft 11 in)
- Upper wingspan: 8.2 m (26 ft 11 in) upper forward and rear wings
- Lower wingspan: 7.0 m (23 ft 0 in)
- Wing area: 27.5 m^{2} (296 sq ft) all three wings
- Empty weight: 535 kg (1,179 lb)
- Gross weight: 1,019 kg (2,247 lb)
- Powerplant: 1 × Lycoming O-360-A2A air-cooled flat four, 130 kW (180 hp)
- Propellers: 2-bladed
