= Lawhorn Kee Bird =

General information
- Type: Homebuilt aircraft
- National origin: United States of America
- Designer: Jerry Lawhorn

History
- First flight: July 1957

The Lawhorn Kee Bird is a high-wing, conventional landing gear homebuilt aircraft designed for bush flying.

== Design and development ==
The Kee Bird is the second design from Jerry Lawhorn. It was designed as a low-cost hunting, camping and fishing transport in high-altitude rough landing strips.

The key feature of the aircraft are the oversized 35 in (89 cm) tires for tundra operations. The fuselage is of steel tube construction with doped aircraft fabric covering with round porthole windows. It features upward opening doors, removable seats and overhead mounted wheel controls. The windscreen uses 1/8" safety glass. The aluminium wings were sourced from a Boeing YL-15.

Aircraft construction started in September 1954 and completed in July 1957.

== Specifications (Lawhorn Kee Bird) ==
Data from Sport Aviation

General characteristics

- Capacity: 3
- Length: 23 ft 6 in (7.16 m)
- Wingspan: 39 ft (12 m)
- Wing area: 260 sq ft (24 m^{2})
- Airfoil: 4415
- Empty weight: 1,477 lb (670 kg)
- Gross weight: 2,250 lb (1,021 kg)
- Powerplant: 1 × Lycoming O-435-1 , 190 hp (140 kW)
- Propellers: 2-bladed Hartzell

Performance

- Maximum speed: 109 kn (125 mph, 201 km/h)
- Cruise speed: 96 kn (110 mph, 180 km/h)
- Stall speed: 23 kn (26 mph, 42 km/h)
- Rate of climb: 1,200 ft/min (6.1 m/s)
