= LFG V 3 Susanna =

1910s German flying boat

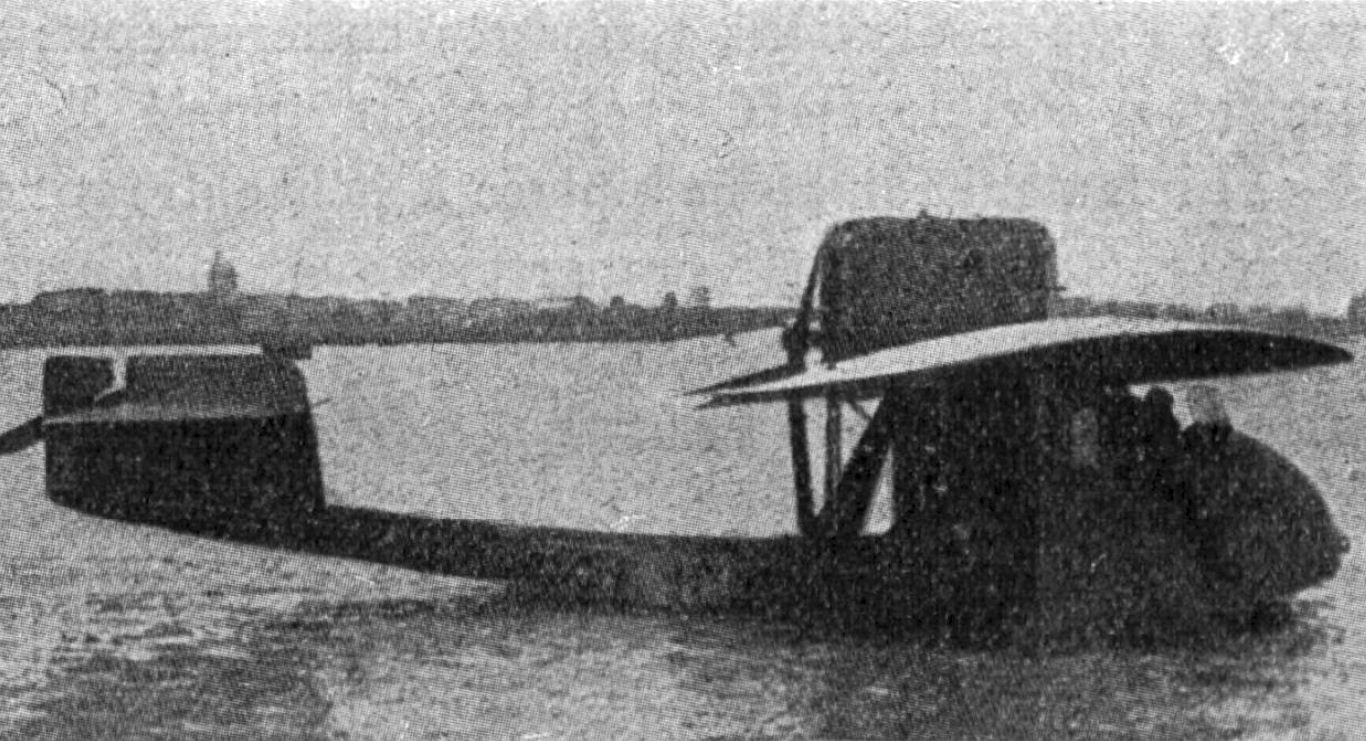
- LFG V 3a Susanne

General information
- Type: Tourer or trainer
- National origin: Germany
- Manufacturer: Luft-Fahrzeug-Gesellschaft (LFG)
- Number built: 1 V 3 and 1 V 3a

History
- First flight: 1919

The LFG V 3 Susanna was a three-seat, high wing monoplane flying boat with a single, pusher configuration engine mounted above the wing. A later variant, the LFG V 3a Susanne, was a bigger, more powerful four-seater. Only one of each was built.

== Design and development ==
During World War I Luft-Fahrzeug-Gesellschaft (LFG) were best known for their Roland fighter series, though there were several water-borne designs amongst their one-off prototypes, both floatplanes and flying boats. The LFG 3 Susanna or LFG V 3 Susanne was their first post-war flying boat, appearing in 1919. Though many German prototypes of this period were judged by the Allies to be warplanes and destroyed, the Susanna was accepted as a civil type.

The wing of the Susanna was essentially rectangular in plan, though the tips were slightly angled and the trailing edge complicated by overhung ailerons and a central cut-out for the pusher propeller. Its 88 kW (118 hp; 120 PS) Mercedes D.II was on top of the centre-section, supported by transverse, inward leaning pairs of struts from the upper and lower fuselage. The outer wings were braced on each side with an N-strut from the upper fuselage to the wing spars.

The flying boat had a rectangular section fuselage with a flat, single-step planing bottom. Short sponsons under the wing gave stability on water. Both pilot and passengers sat in open cockpits within a fairing on top of the forward fuselage. The pilot was near the nose, with side-by side rear seats immediately behind him under the wing leading edge. Fuel, carried in a 30 L (6.6 imp gal; 7.9 US gal) tank in the sponsons and another, 30 L (6.6 imp gal; 7.9 US gal) tank in the fuselage was pumped to the engine by compressed air. Behind the step the fuselage was narrow in profile though wider in plan. The tail was conventional with rectangular, broad chord fixed surfaces. A vertical tail, broader than it was high, carried a narrow, straight-edged, conventionally balanced rudder. The tailplane was high on the fin and had, like the aileron, elevators with horn-balances; they had a nick for rudder movement.

In 1920 a more powerful, four seat variant, the V 3a Susanne, was flown. It was similar to the V 3 but the wing plan was no longer as rectangular, having blunted and more angled tips. The horn-balanced ailerons were replaced with conventional surfaces. Its completely revised hull was shallow but wide, curving outwards in plan from the nose, at its broadest under the wing and tapering smoothly back to the tail. The extra width provided stability on the water and the sponsons had gone. The underside ahead of the single step, just aft of the centre of gravity, was concave in section rather than flat; behind it the profile was "claw-like", dipping down into the water then up again to the tail. On top of the hull, the pilot had a wider cockpit with room beside him for one passenger and the other two now had the protection of a small, enclosed cabin. The tail was also modified: a single strut on each side strengthened the tailplane from below, the elevator horn balances were removed, the rectangular tail surfaces blunted and the tailplane given angled tips. The control surfaces were partly duralumin.

It was powered by a 136 kW (182 hp; 185 PS), six-cylinder, 17.5 L (1,070 cu in) Benz Bz.IIIa inline engine, mounted above the wing and driving a larger, 2.9 m (9 ft 6 in) diameter propeller. It was also larger, with span increased by 8% and length by 14%. These modifications increased the empty weight from 700 kg (1,500 lb) to 1,200 kg (2,600 lb). A fuel capacity of 195 L (43 imp gal; 52 US gal) gave the V 3a a duration of 4 hours.

== Operational history ==
Both the LFG V 3s were entered onto the German civil register by June 1920. In October 1920 an order was placed for one by a Hamburg based company who intended to move it to Norway. This may have been the V 3 as Andersson and Sanger suggest, though in December LFG was granted an export licence for an aircraft with an 185 hp engine, pointing to the V 3a. It was transported to Hamburg but then put in store. In November 1921 its engine was confiscated by the RTG, the body set up in early 1920 to destroy German aircraft and engines or distribute them between the Allies. Nothing more is known about it, but it never reached Norway.

== Variants ==
V 3 Susanna
Three seat flying boat with single, over-wing pusher engine. Sponsons.
V 3a Susanne
Four seat, enlarged and more powerful with completely new hull without sponsons. Cleaned up and with revised control surfaces.

== Specifications (V 3 Susanna) ==
Data from die deutschen Flugboote (1978), p.211

General characteristics

- Crew: one pilot
- Capacity: two passengers or student
- Length: 8.33 m (27 ft 4 in)
- Wingspan: 13.32 m (43 ft 8 in)
- Height: 2.82 m (9 ft 3 in)
- Empty weight: 700 kg (1,543 lb)
- Gross weight: 1,130 kg (2,491 lb)
- Fuel capacity: 110 L (24 imp gal; 29 US gal)
- Powerplant: 1 × Mercedes D.II six cylinder, water-cooled, 88 kW (118 hp) 120 PS

Performance

- Maximum speed: 135 km/h (84 mph, 73 kn)
