= LFG V 58 =

1920s German aircraft

V 58
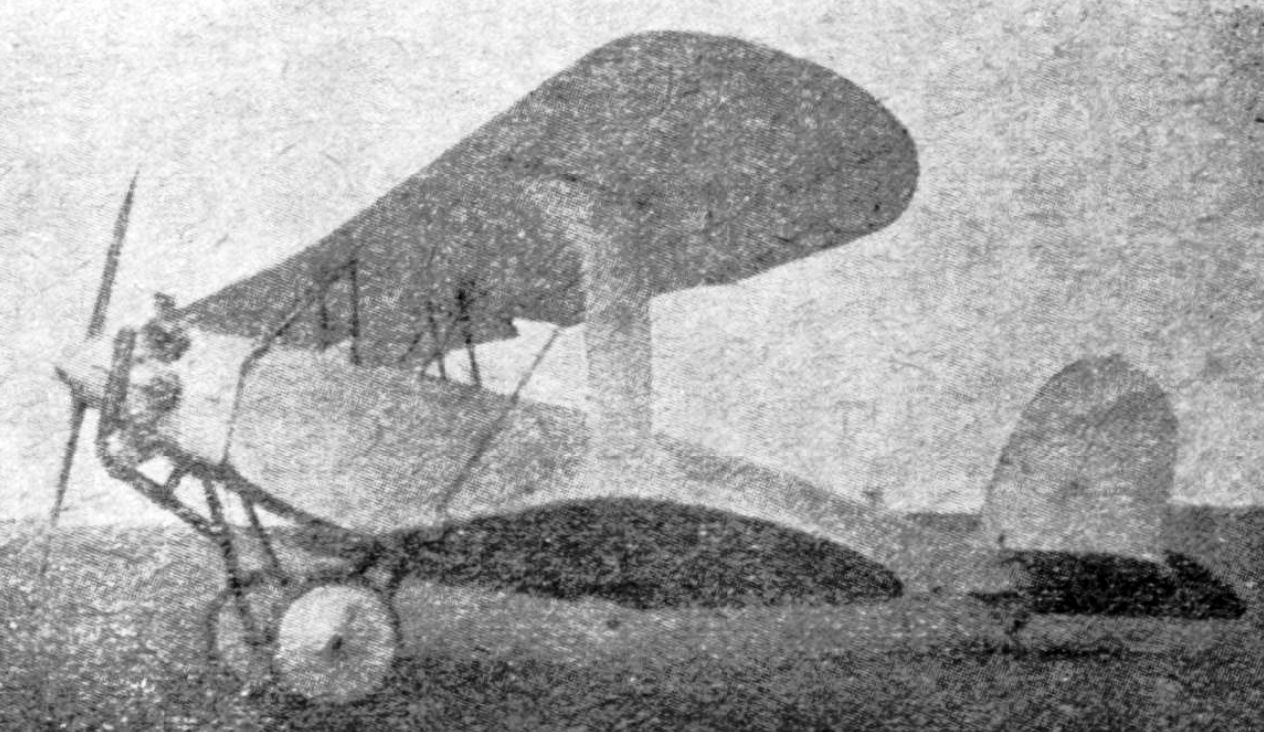

General information
- Type: Light sport aircraft
- National origin: Germany
- Manufacturer: LFG
- Status: prototype only
- Number built: 1

History
- First flight: 1926

The LFG V 58 was a light sport aircraft built in Germany in the late 1920s.

== Specifications ==
Data from

General characteristics

- Crew: 2
- Length: 6.70 m (22 ft 0 in)
- Wingspan: 10.00 m (32 ft 10 in)
- Height: 2.70 m (8 ft 10 in)
- Wing area: 24.00 m^{2} (258.3 sq ft)
- Empty weight: 530 kg (1,168 lb)
- Gross weight: 750 kg (1,653 lb)
- Powerplant: 1 × Siemens-Halske Sh.11 seven-cylinder radial engine , 75 kW (100 hp)

Performance

- Maximum speed: 130 km/h (81 mph, 70 kn)
- Cruise speed: 115 km/h (71 mph, 62 kn)
- Range: 165 km (103 mi, 89 nmi)
