= Lambert Mission 106 =

Mission 106
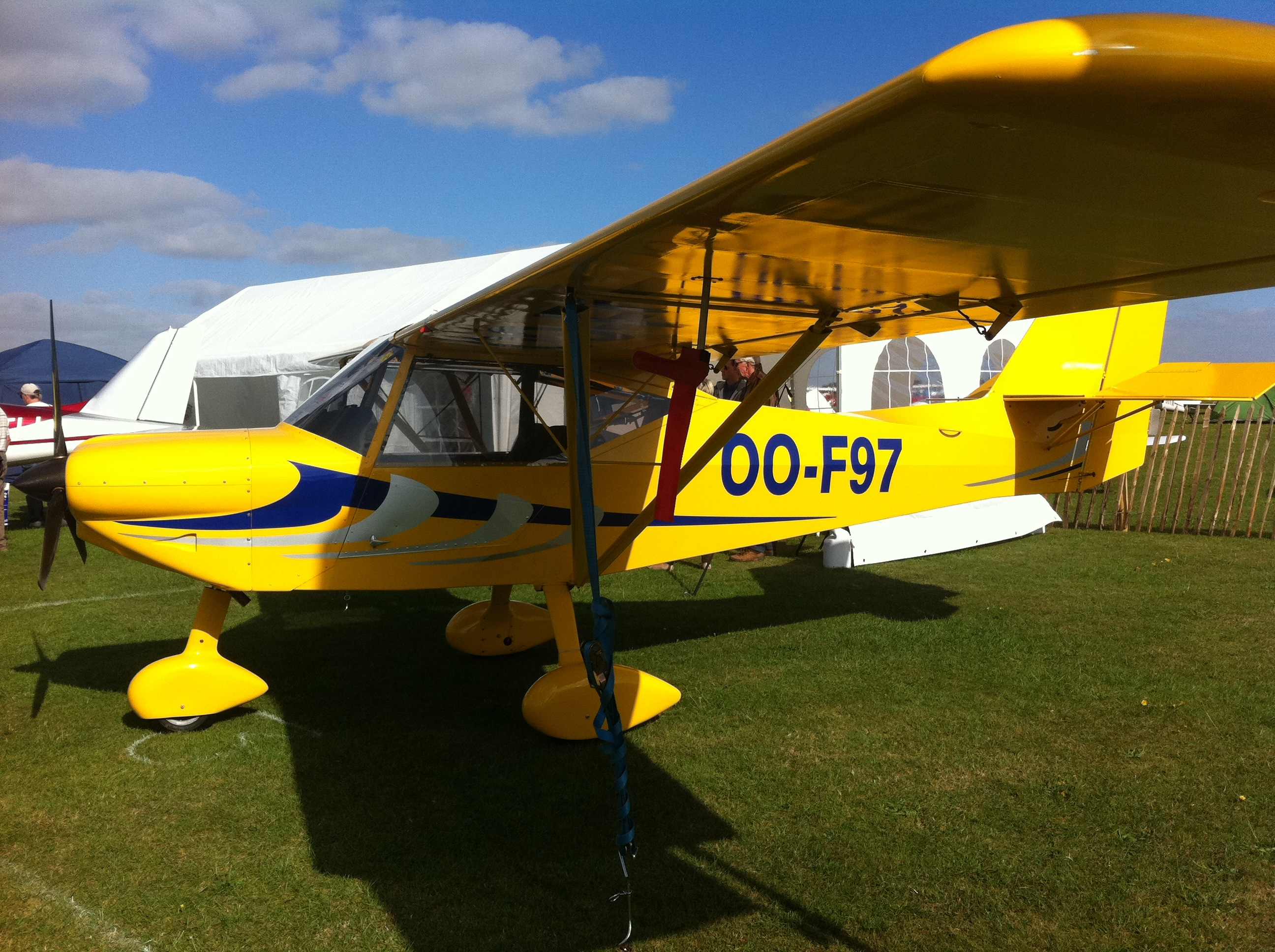

General information
- Type: Two seat ultralight
- National origin: Belgium
- Manufacturer: Lambert Aircraft Engineering BVBA
- Status: In production
- Number built: c.10

History
- First flight: c.2003

The Lambert Mission 106 is a conventionally laid out, high-wing ultralight, seating two side-by-side. Designed in Belgium, there are ULM and LSA versions.

== Design and development ==
The first prototype of the M106 was built and flown in the Slovak Republic around 2003. Its constant chord wing has twin tubular aluminium spars with wooden ribs and, like the rest of the aircraft, is fabric covered. The wing, with 2° of dihedral, carries pushrod-operated Frise ailerons and manual flaps. On each side a pair of V-form lift struts of circular cross section brace the wing to the lower fuselage longerons, assisted by further jury struts. The fuselage and empennage have a steel alloy structure. The fin and rudder are swept and the horizontal tail is placed slightly above the upper fuselage line; the fin and tailplane are wire braced together. The port elevator carries a trim tab. There is side-by-side seating for two under the wing leading edge.

After trials with Rotax and Volkswagen engines, Lambert chose the Belgian 61 kW (82 hp) ULPower UL260i flat-four to power the M106. The development period also produced changes to the undercarriage, which initially had V-strut main legs and half-axles. These were replaced with cantilever spring glass fiber legs. The standard M106 has a fixed tailwheel undercarriage, though tricycle gear is an option. The wheels may be faired. A glass cockpit electronic flight instrument system is standard equipment.

Production began in late 2005 with a batch of eight aircraft built in the Slovak Republic and assembled in Belgium. Belgian CAA certification was obtained in April 2006. The M106 is built to meet the European ULM maximum takeoff weight (MTOW) limits of 450 kg (992 lb) and is available only in flyaway form; the M108 variant is heavier, intended for areas which allow higher MTOWs, and may be kit built.

== Operational history ==
Eight Mission 106s appeared on the European Civil aircraft registers in mid-2010 and one 108 is registered in the UK in 2012.

== Variants ==
Mission 106
MTOW of 450 kg (992 lb) to meet European ULM regulations.
Mission 108
LSA compatible version, strengthened version with a maximum takeoff weight of 600 kg (1,323 lb), 75 kW (100 hp) Rotax engine. Kits available, tricycle or tailwheel landing gear.

== Specifications (Mission M106) ==
Data from Jane's All the World's Aircraft 2011/12

General characteristics

- Capacity: two
- Length: 6.10 m (20 ft 0 in)
- Wingspan: 9.32 m (30 ft 7 in)
- Height: 2.15 m (7 ft 1 in) tailwheel undercarriage
- Wing area: 11.80 m^{2} (127.0 sq ft)
- Airfoil: NACA 230102
- Empty weight: 260 kg (573 lb)
- Max takeoff weight: 450 kg (992 lb) 495 kg (1.091 lb) where allowed
- Fuel capacity: 78 L (20.6 US gal; 15.4 Imp gal)
- Powerplant: 1 × ULPower UL260i flat-four, 61 kW (82 hp)
- Propellers: 3-bladed DUC Swirl ground adjustable pitch

Performance

- Maximum speed: 185 km/h (115 mph, 100 kn)
- Cruise speed: 157 km/h (98 mph, 85 kn)
- Stall speed: 65 km/h (40 mph, 35 kn) flaps down
- Never exceed speed: 210 km/h (130 mph, 110 kn)
- Range: 700 km (430 mi, 380 nmi) at 75% power
- Rate of climb: 5.08 m/s (1,000 ft/min) maximum at sea level
- Take-off run: 110 m (361 ft)

Avionics

- Dyson Avionics D100 EFIS and EMS D10 standard
