= Latécoère 500 =

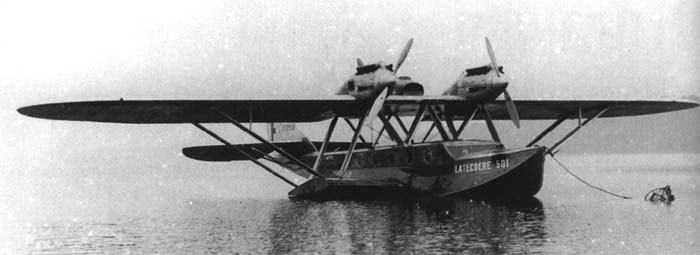
- Latécoère 501

General information
- Type: Flying boat mail plane
- National origin: France
- Manufacturer: Latécoère
- Status: Retired
- Number built: 2

History
- First flight: 24 February 1932

The Latécoère 500 was a flying boat designed and produced by the French aircraft manufacturer Latécoère.

The Latécoère 500 was developed during the early 1930s specifically for use on the transatlantic mail route to South America. The design process drew upon multiple aspects of the company's previous flying boats; specifically, the shaping of the hull was derived from both the Latécoère 340 and the Latécoère 380. The resulting aircraft was a large parasol-wing monoplane equipped with broad sponsons and a fully enclosed cabin. Three engines were installed on the wing, two tractor-fashion on the leading edge, and one pusher-fashion on the trailing edge.

In response to a specification issued by the French aviation ministry, Latécoère also produced a passenger-carrying variant, the Latécoère 501, which actually flew first. However, flight testing revealed that the 500 possessed poor flying qualities, and thus was not accepted for service and soon after scrapped. The Latécoère 501 was operated for a while on passenger routes across the Mediterranean.

== Design ==
The Latécoère 500 is a large sesquiplane flying boat. Both the structure and the hull itself were composed of metal, primarily duralumin. It had a twin-step hull, the forward one being intended to benefit the aircraft's take-off performance while the rear step improved its landing characteristics. This hull featured a distinctive sharp stern, a curved V-shaped bottom, and a pair of symmetrical planing fins that ensured transverse stability on the water as well as accommodated fuel; the internal volume of the planing fins was divided by a transverse bulkhead as to provide an individual fuel supply for each engine.

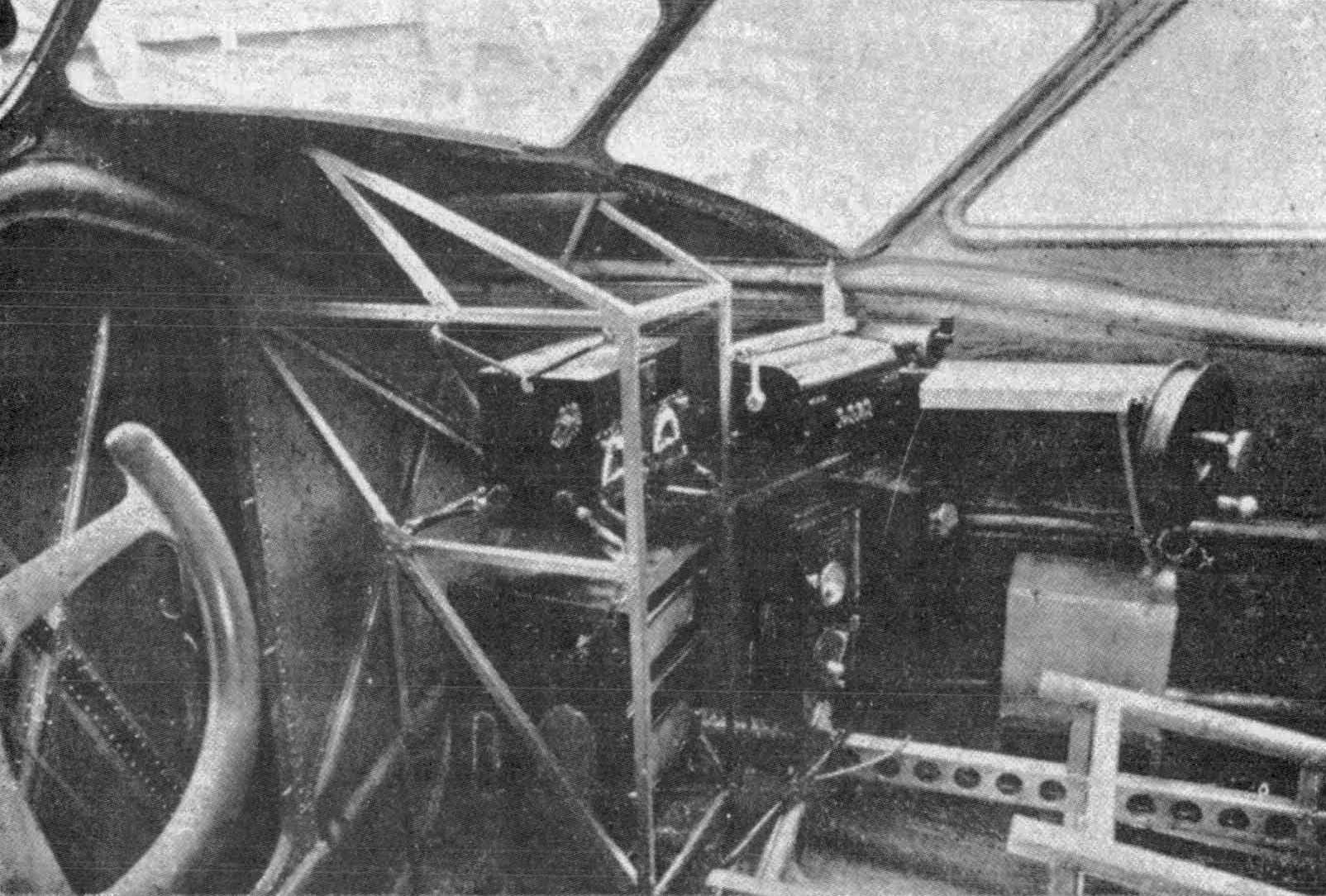
Navigator's position of a Latécoère 500

The central hull of the flying boat was divided into four watertight compartments, these being the pilot's station, the main passenger cabin, the baggage hold, and a second hold intended for mail. The pilot's station was fully enclosed and was typically operated by a crew of three, the pilot being seated on the left while stations provisioned with instrumentation and apparatus for the radio operator and navigator were located on the right. While on the water, personnel could climb out onto the deck via a hatch in the pilot's station. The cabin, which could comfortably seat up to eight passengers and adorned by eight relatively large portholes, was accessed via a passage that separated the cabin from the lavatory. In addition to the mail itself, a bilge pump and various tools for the mechanic were also present in the mail compartment.

The wing of the Latécoère 500 is of a relatively conventional twin-spar design, being cross-braced by a combination of alloy tubing and high-tensile steel wires. While the central section of the wing was composed of metal, the majority of the wing and tail surfaces were composed of fabric. Both the rudder and elevator were balanced using compact metal ailerons that were adjustable in flight. The stresses incurred by the wing struts were transferred to the spar via steel fittings that were treated to be rustproof, while continuous I-section stringers transferred the skin stresses to the transverse frames. The box spars featured lightened webs and multiple flanges. The tail surfaces was of typical braced monoplane design, the structure of which used tubular spars, truss-type ribs, and lightened webs.

The Latécoère 500 was powered by a total of three Hispano-Suiza 12Jb engines, which combined were capable of generating up to 1,200 hp; this provided sufficient power that the takeoff run could still be completed successfully even in the event of a single engine failure. The central engine was fitted in a Pusher configuration while the other two used a tractor configuration instead. All three engine were mounted on the wing via tubular struts and cross-based between the two wing spars via tubes and steel wires. An individual fuel system was used for each engine; an auxiliary hand pump could supply fuel to any or all of the engines if so required. Cooling was provided via three Chausson radiators, one mounted directly beneath each engine. The oil tanks were located within the engine nacelles. The British manufacturer Bristol Aeroplane Company supplied the engine starter system, it also powered the onboard radio set.

== Variants ==
- Latécoère 500 - mailplane version (1 built)
- Latécoère 501 - airliner version (1 built)

== Specifications (Laté 500) ==
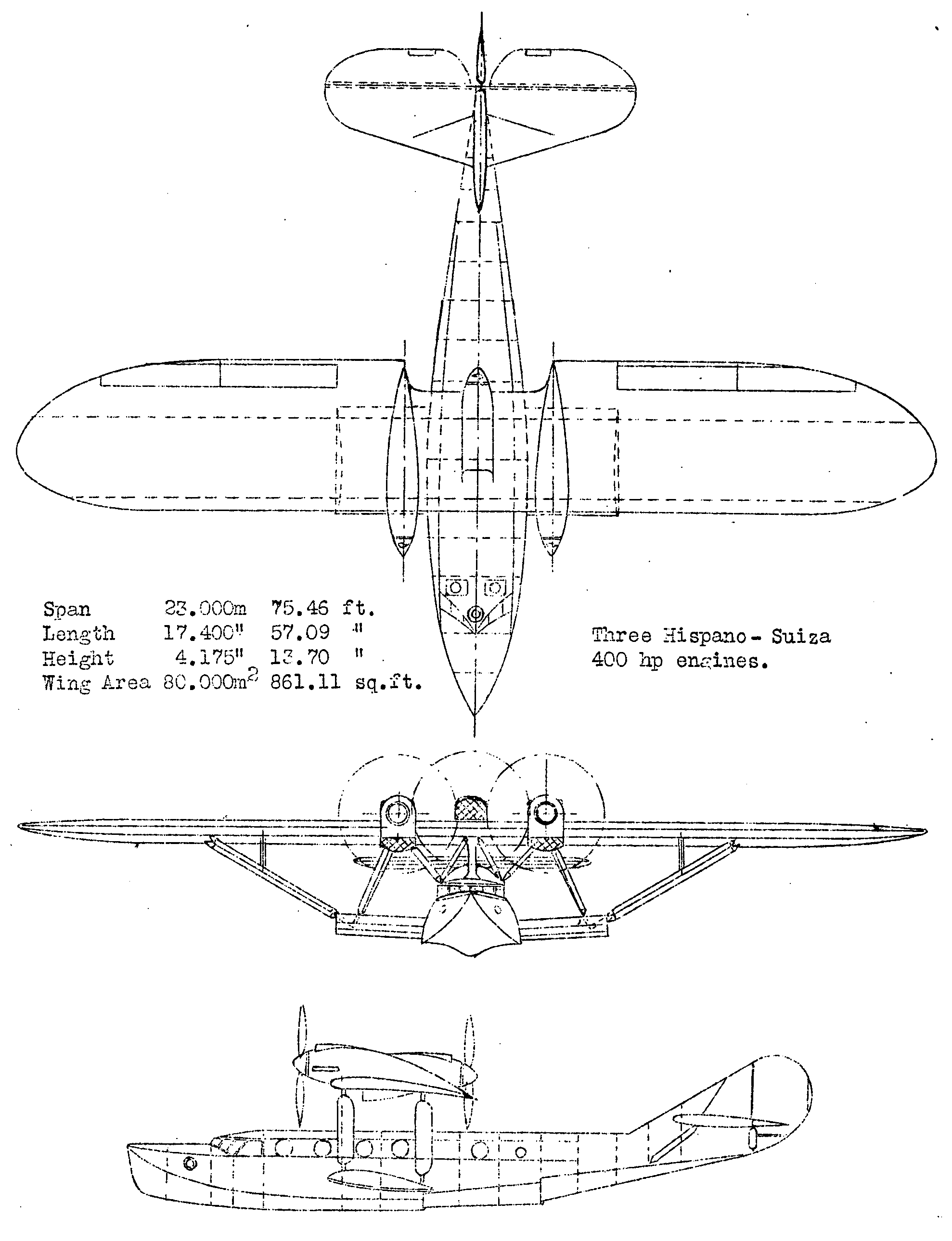
Latécoère 501 3-view drawing from NACA-AC-170

Data from N.A.C.A

General characteristics

- Crew: Three
- Length: 17.74 m (58 ft 2 in)
- Wingspan: 31.40 m (103 ft 0 in)
- Height: 4.93 m (16 ft 2 in)
- Wing area: 148.3 m^{2} (1,600 sq ft)
- Empty weight: 4,446 kg (9,802 lb)
- Gross weight: 9,816 kg (21,641 lb)
- Powerplant: 3 × Hispano-Suiza 12Jb , 300 kW (400 hp) each

Performance

- Maximum speed: 210 km/h (130 mph, 110 kn)
- Range: 4,800 km (3,000 mi, 2,600 nmi)
- Service ceiling: 4,600 m (15,100 ft)
