= Latécoère 440 =

440

General information
- Type: Torpedo and conventional floatplane
- National origin: France
- Manufacturer: Latécoère (La societe industrielle d'aviation Latécoère)
- Number built: 2

History
- First flight: 1931
- Developed from: Latécoère 28

The Latécoère 440 was a single-engined, high-winged float plane built as a coastal defence aircraft for the French Navy in the early 1930s. Two were produced to contract but did not impress in tests and the Navy chose instead the Latécoère 290.

== Design and development ==
At the end of the 1920s the French Navy saw the need for a coastal defence aircraft, capable of attacking hostile ships with torpedoes or bombs at distances up to 400 km from the coast. They preferred an aircraft that operated from water and, to be capable of torpedo launches, this required a floatplane design rather than a flying boat. The Latécoère 440 was designed to this brief and gained the company contracts for two prototypes in September 1930. The 440 was based on the floatplane version, type 28-3 of the Latécoère 28 transport, though strengthened for military use. The two types were very similar in appearance and dimensions, though the 440 had different crew accommodation to suit its military purpose, a slightly uprated version of the single Hispano-Suiza 12 engine and a revised fin.

The high wings of the 440 had exactly the same span of those of the 28 and the same plan away from the centre section, of constant chord with roughly elliptical tips. They were constructed from a mixture of wood and metal, based on two rectangular spars and fabric covered. Double ailerons covered most of the straight part of the trailing edge. There were a pair of very wide chord lift struts under each wing, linking the lower fuselage longeron to the two wing spars near mid-span. The centre section was supported by four faired spars from points on the lift struts about 30% outboard, together with a steel cabane.

The Latécoère 440 was powered by a 650 hp (485 kW) Hispano-Suiza 12 Nbr upright V-12 engine. Two of its radiators were placed on the underside of the lift struts, close to the fuselage, with a third on the port side of the fuselage itself. This allowed a smoothly streamlined nose profile, though the cross-section of the fuselage here and elsewhere was essentially rectangular. The aircraft commander, who was also navigator and bomb aimer was stationed with his bomb sights immediately behind the engine firewall. The pilot's cabin was under the wing, with his windshield at about mid chord; he had a Rhodoid glazed panel in the wing for a better view. The cabin rear was glazed and extended into a deep cut-out in the wing trailing edge to improve upward visibility. It merged into the gunner/radio operator's circular glazed cupola. The three crew positions were linked by a starboard side corridor which had an external door at each end. The externally braced tailplane, placed on the top of the fuselage had a swept leading edge and carried split elevators. The fin was nearly triangular but the rudder was deep and rounded. Neither control surface was balanced, but both had trim tabs.

Long floats, each with a displacement of 5.2 m^{3} and a single step were mounted on pairs of very wide chord vertical members that joined the lift struts at the same point as those going upwards to the centre section. Bracing was provided by a single, similar strut on each side from float to lower fuselage, leaning backwards at about 60°. No tail float was necessary as the 440 sat at flight attitude on the water. Though designed for a floatplane role, the 440 could and did fly as a landplane. In that configuration the main undercarriage leg replaced the forward of the two float struts and the axle was linked to the lower fuselage by a V form pair of radius struts. In both configurations, the offensive armament of torpedoes or bombs was carried on the fuselage underside, between the undercarriage legs.

The date of the first flight is uncertain, but the first of the two 440s was delivered to the CEPA (Centre d'Expérimentation Pratique de l'Aviation Navale) at St-Raphael on 22 September 1931 and the second that December. Trials were delayed by engine problems, the result of coolant circulation difficulties. Examination brought criticism of the float construction, for they were seen as too weak and subject to corrosion for prolonged service at sea. The flight characteristics were also criticised, CEPA pilots finding the controls heavy. There was also a serious lateral instability, which, together with poor visibility hindered the deployment of the torpedo.

In the end it was decided to abandon the 440 in favour of the cheaper Latécoère 290, another militarised version of the Latécoère 280 transport. The fate of the first 440 is not known, but the second machine remained in use at St-Raphael until at least 1934, serving as a general-purpose and training aircraft.

== Specifications (floatplane) ==
Data from Cuny 1992, pp. 195

General characteristics

- Crew: 3
- Length: 14.10 m (46 ft 3 in)
- Wingspan: 19.25 m (63 ft 2 in)
- Height: 5.545 m (18 ft 2 in)
- Wing area: 58.40 m^{2} (628.6 sq ft)
- Empty weight: 3,082 kg (6,795 lb)
- Gross weight: 5,181 kg (11,422 lb)
- Powerplant: 1 × Hispano-Suiza 12 Nbr water-cooled V-12, 480 kW (650 hp) at 2,000 rpm
- Propellers: 2-bladed Ratier 9380, metal, fixed pitch, 4.20 m (13 ft 9 in) diameter

Performance

- Maximum speed: 225 km/h (140 mph, 121 kn) at sea level
- Cruise speed: 170 km/h (110 mph, 92 kn) at sea level
- Combat range: 790 km (490 mi, 430 nmi) Radius of action
- Service ceiling: 4,000 m (13,000 ft)
- Rate of climb: 2.04 m/s (402 ft/min) to 3,000 m (9,843 ft)

Armament

- 2×forward firing 7.7 mm (0.303 in) Vickers machine guns, replenishable from bomb aimer's position
- 2×movable 7.7 mm (0.303 in) Lewis guns in dorsal cupola
- 2×movable 7.7 mm (0.303 in) Lewis guns in ventral position
- 1×700 kg (1,543 lb) torpedo under centre section, off-set to starboard, or
- 2×420 kg (926 lb) bombs, or
- similar combinations of lance bombs, etc
