= Latécoère 22 =

1920s French aircraft

General information
- Type: Mail plane
- National origin: France
- Manufacturer: Latécoère
- Number built: 1

History
- First flight: 1927

The Latécoère 22 was a French mailplane built for Lignes Aériennes Latécoère in 1927.

== Design ==
The Latecoere 22 was a single-seat high-wing parasol monoplane intended for mail freight.

== Specifications (Latécoère 22) ==
Data from

General characteristics

- Crew: 1
- Length: 8.2 m (26 ft 11 in)
- Wingspan: 12.6 m (41 ft 4 in)
- Height: 2.98 m (9 ft 9 in)
- Wing area: 27 m^{2} (290 sq ft)
- Empty weight: 967 kg (2,132 lb)
- Gross weight: 1,821 kg (4,015 lb)
- Powerplant: 1 × Lorraine 8BI V-8 water-cooled inverted piston engine, 190 kW (260 hp)

Performance

- Maximum speed: 175 km/h (109 mph, 94 kn)
- Range: 325 km (202 mi, 175 nmi)
- Service ceiling: 4,000 m (13,000 ft)
