= Latécoère 26 =

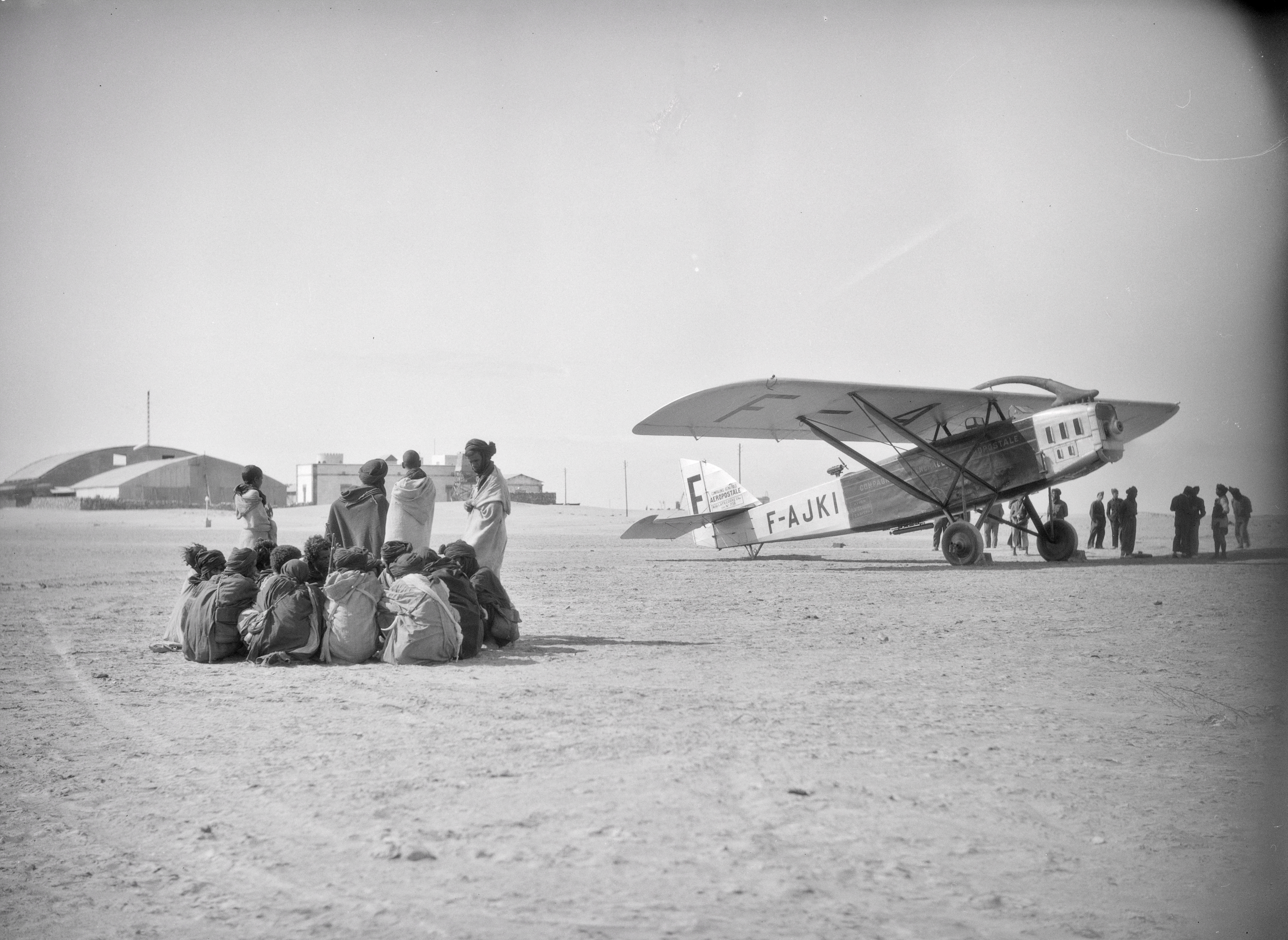

General information
- Type: Mail-carrying monoplane
- Manufacturer: Latécoère
- Primary user: Aéropostale
- Number built: 90

History
- First flight: 1926

The Latécoère 26 was a French monoplane mail plane designed and built by Latécoère.

== Development ==
The Latécoère 26 was designed in the 1920s as a mail carrier, based on the earlier Latécoère 25 with a longer fuselage, and first flew in 1926. It had a parasol wing with a fixed tailskid landing gear. The main landing gear was both robust and wide-track, to enable the aircraft to land on unprepared surfaces. It was powered by a single nose-mounted Renault 12Ja piston engine, and had room for only two passengers and an open cockpit for the pilot.

== Operational history ==
Most of the aircraft were operated by Aéropostale on North and West African mail routes; two aircraft were sold in Argentina.

== Variants ==
Laté 26
Initial production variant.
Laté 26-2-R
Introduced in 1927 it had a radio compartment.
Laté 26-3
Added fuel tank in wing centre-section.
Laté 26-3-R
With a balanced rudder.
Laté 26-6
Added a co-pilots cockpit in tandem behind the pilot, different landing gear and increased fuel capacity.
Laté 26-6/2
Re-engined with a 500hp (373kW) Renault engine and reduced wing area and tail surfaces.

== Operators ==
Argentina
France

- Aéropostale

== Specifications (26-2-R) ==
Data from The Illustrated Encyclopedia of Aircraft (Part Work 1982-1985). Orbis Publishing. p. 2293.

General characteristics

- Crew: 1
- Capacity: 2 passengers and 5 m³ (176.57 ft³) of mail.
- Length: 17.4 m (57 ft 0 in)
- Wingspan: 17.40 m (57 ft 1 in)
- Height: 3.90 m (12 ft 1.5 in)
- Wing area: 48.60 m^{2} (523.14 sq ft)
- Empty weight: 1,590 kg (3,505 lb)
- Gross weight: 3,364 kg (7,416 lb)
- Powerplant: 1 × Renault 12Ja V-12 piston engine , 336 kW (450 hp)

Performance

- Maximum speed: 188 km/h (117 mph, 102 kn)
- Range: 680 km (423 mi, 368 nmi)
- Service ceiling: 4,750 m (15,585 ft)

== See also ==
- Mail plane
