= Latécoère 298 =

1936 French seaplane family

General information
- Type: Torpedo-bomber seaplane
- Manufacturer: Latécoère, Breguet
- Status: Retired
- Primary users: French Navy Luftwaffe
- Number built: 121

History
- Introduction date: 28 October 1938
- First flight: 6 May 1936
- Retired: 1951

The Latécoère 298 (sometimes abridged to Laté 298) was a French seaplane that served during World War II. It was designed primarily as a torpedo bomber, but served also as a dive bomber against land and naval targets, and as a maritime reconnaissance aircraft. Of a sturdy and reliable construction and possessing good manoeuvrability, it was France's most successful military seaplane, and served throughout the war in various guises.

== Development ==
The design originated in a French Navy requirement for a torpedo bomber to replace the unsuccessful Laté 29 that had just entered service. The prototype Laté 298, as it came to be known, was completed at Latécoère's Toulouse plant in 1936 and first flew on 6 May 1936.

It was designed as a single-engined, mid-wing cantilever monoplane, powered by an 880 hp Hispano-Suiza 12Y twelve-cylinder liquid-cooled engine. Two exceptionally large floats were attached to the fuselage by struts, each one containing a fuel tank.

A ventral crutch served to accommodate different payloads, depending on the mission. It could carry one Type 1926 DA torpedo, two 150 kg bombs or depth charges. Additional armament consisted of three 7.5 mm Darne machine guns, two fixed forward firing and one rear-firing on a flexible mount.

== Operational history ==
The first Laté 298s entered service in October 1938 with the Escadrilles (squadrons) of the Aéronautique Navale, the French Navy air force. Some were based in naval bases, and others on the seaplane tender Commandant Teste. At the outbreak of the war four squadrons flew with this aircraft, and by May 1940, when the German offensive in the west began, 81 aircraft equipped six squadrons.

The Laté 298s first saw action during the Battle of France in 1940. They were used at first for maritime patrol and anti-submarine duties, but did not meet any German ships. Later, as the Wehrmacht drove through France, they were used to harass and interdict armoured columns. Despite not having been designed for this role, they suffered fewer losses than units equipped with other types.

After the armistice of June 1940, the French Navy under the Vichy regime was allowed to retain some Laté 298 units, and captured aircraft were used by the Luftwaffe.

After Operation Torch, French units in Africa sided with the Allies. In this guise, the Laté 298 was used for Coastal Command missions in North Africa, in cooperation with Royal Air Force Wellingtons.

The Laté 298's final combat missions were flown during the liberation of France, where they were used to attack German shipping operating from strongholds on the Atlantic coast.

The last Laté 298s were retired from active service in 1946, but continued to serve as trainers until 1950.

No Laté 298 aircraft survived after 1950.

== Variants ==
All variants powered by a Hispano-Suiza 12Ycrs-1 engine.

- Laté 298A: First production variant.
- Laté 298B: Variant with folding wings for use on seaplane carriers; observation post added; crew of four.
- Laté 298D: Similar to 298B without the folding wings.
- Laté 298E: Observation variant with the fixed weapons replaced by an observer's gondola; one prototype built.
- Laté 299: A land-based three-seat reconnaissance-torpedo bomber derived from the Late 298, powered by a 920 hp Hispano-Suiza 12Y-43, first flight on 7 July 1939, (two prototypes built).

== Operators ==
France

- French Navy

Vichy France

- Vichy French Air Force

Nazi Germany

- Luftwaffe

== Specifications (Laté 298D) ==
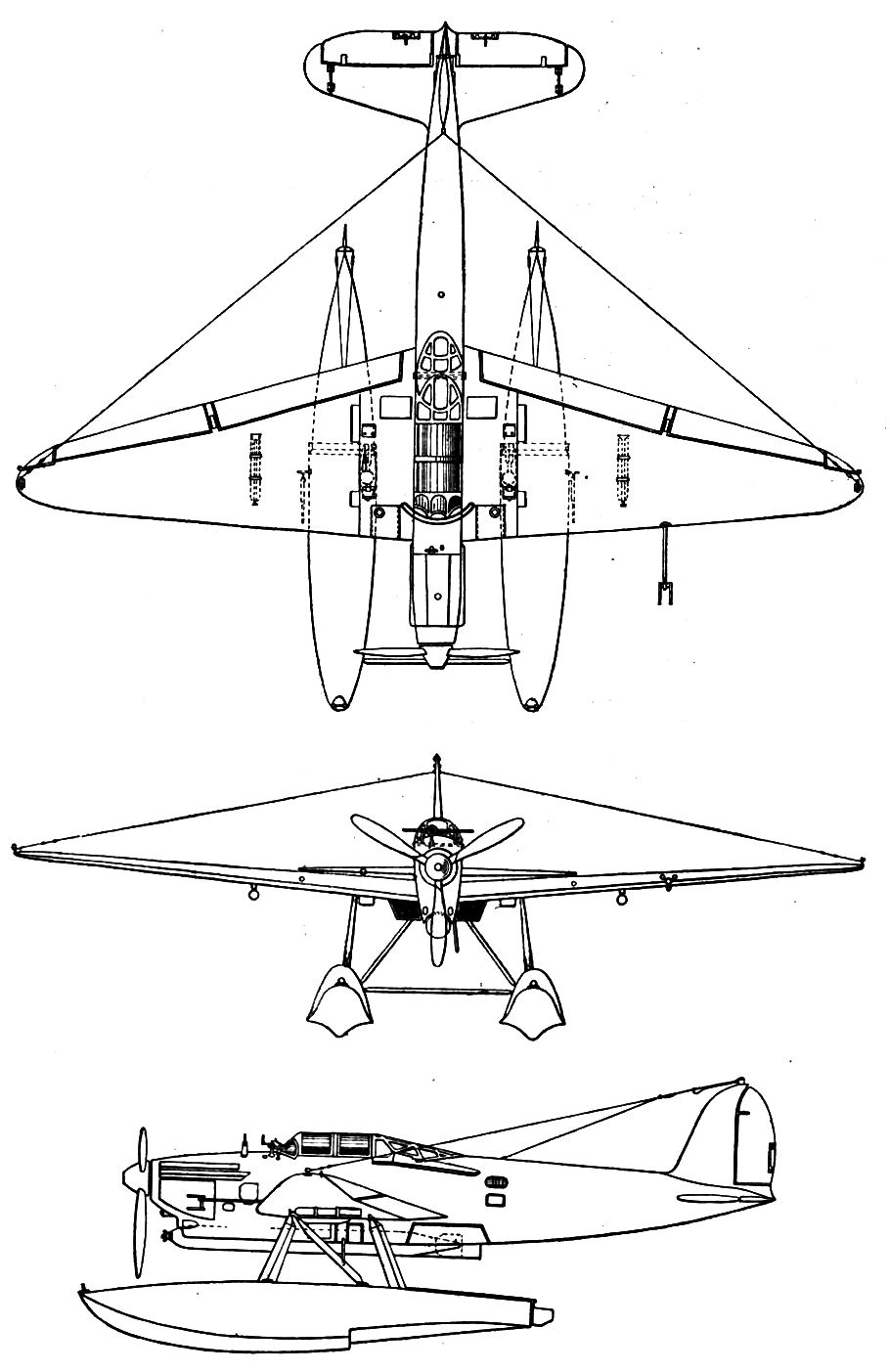
Late 298 3-view drawing from L'Aerophile December 1943

Data from aviafrance

General characteristics

- Crew: 3
- Length: 12.56 m (41 ft 2 in)
- Wingspan: 15.5 m (50 ft 10 in)
- Height: 5.25 m (17 ft 3 in)
- Wing area: 31.6 m^{2} (340 sq ft)
- Airfoil: Clark CYH
- Empty weight: 3,085 kg (6,801 lb)
- Gross weight: 4,533 kg (9,994 lb)
- Powerplant: 1 × Hispano-Suiza 12Ycrs-1 V-12 liquid-cooled piston engine, 660 kW (880 hp)
- Propellers: 3-bladed variable-pitch propeller

Performance

- Maximum speed: 295 km/h (183 mph, 159 kn) at 2,500 m (8,200 ft)
- Range: 1,000 km (620 mi, 540 nmi)
- Service ceiling: 5,500 m (18,000 ft)
- Time to altitude: 1,000 m (3,300 ft) in 6 minutes 33 seconds

Armament

- Guns: 3 × 7.5 mm Darne machine guns
- Bombs: 680 kg (1,499 lb) bombs / torpedo

== See also ==
Related lists

- List of aircraft of World War II
