= Latécoère 521 =

1930s French flying boat

Laté 521
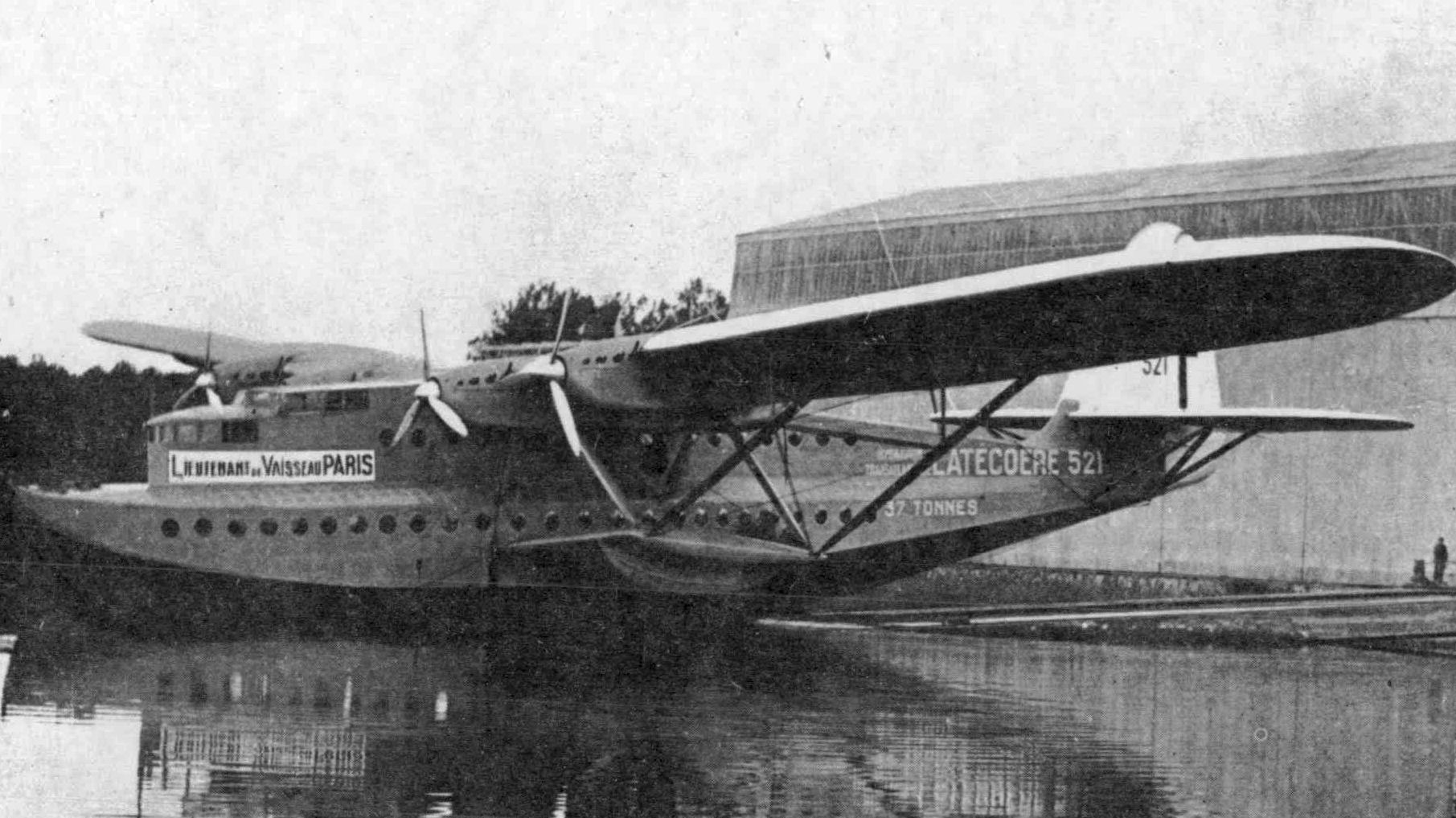

General information
- Type: Transport and maritime patrol flying boat
- Manufacturer: Groupe Latécoère
- Primary user: Air France
- Number built: 5 (1 × 521, 1 × 522, 3 × 523)

History
- First flight: 10 January 1935

The Latécoère 521 was a French six-engined double deck flying boat designed and manufactured by Pierre-Georges Latécoère. At the time of its completion, it held the distinction of being the largest aircraft to be built in France as well as one of the first large passenger aircraft capable of flying trans-Atlantic routes.

First flown on 10 January 1935, the Laté 521 achieved several world records relating to payload and endurance. It was introduced to passenger service by national operator Air France, which was able to launch several previously unattainable long-distance passenger routes. As a civilian aircraft, the Laté 521 was outfitted as a luxurious airliner, providing a high level of comfort for up to 72 passengers. Shortly after the outbreak of the Second World War, the Laté 521 were taken over by the French Navy, who typically operated the type as a long distance maritime patrol aircraft. None survived the conflict due to sabotage by the retreating German forces. The Laté 521 was the basis of the single Laté 522 "Ville de Saint Pierre" civil airliner, and the three Laté 523 navalized variants.

== Design and development ==
During the early 1930s, French aircraft manufacturer Groupe Latécoère set about designing a new large flying boat, which was intended to perform long-range flights, carrying both passengers and air mail. Around this era, France, Germany, the United Kingdom, the Soviet Union, and the United States, were endeavouring to launch ever-larger aircraft that would exceed the scale and payload capabilities of preceding aircraft and ultimately displace the ocean liner as the principal means of passenger travel. The development of such aircraft was a matter of national prestige and Latécoère quickly found support for their endeavour.

The design, designated the Laté 520, was a large sesquiplane, comprising a central double-decked hull and a pair of stub wings, somewhat resembling the smaller Latécoère 300. Weighing roughly 37,000 kg (82,000 lb) loaded and 17,000 kg (37,000 lb) empty, it was the largest aircraft to be manufactured by French industry at that time. It offered a maximum range of 4,500 km (2,800 mi) between refuelling stops. The four inboard water cooled engines, which were mounted as tandem push-pull pairs and intended to be capable of generating up to 750 kW (1,000 hp), enabled the aircraft to attain a maximum design speed of 260 km/h (160 mph). It was named Lieutenant de vaisseau Paris, after an accomplished French naval officer and record-breaking pilot of the era.

The Laté 520 featured a large double-decked hull that provided room for 80 passengers. It featured an all-metal structure, largely composed of duralumin. The hull used a longitudinal construction approach, dissipating stress from the skin across its transverse frames. As a measure to mitigate against potential damage, the hull was divided into seven water-tight compartments. The stub-wings, hinged to the bottom of the hull, each carried a sponson to provide additional stability upon the water, as well as housing large fuel tanks and featuring an airfoil section to assist during takeoff runs. A large number of stiffeners were present throughout the stub-wings to achieve a relatively stress-resistant construction, conveying and distributing stresses across the frames and hull spars.

The wing of the Laté 520 comprised a centre section and two fabric-covered outer sections, these being braced to the stub wings. This wing used a conventional two-spar design, both the box spars and ribs being made of duralumin. The structure of the wing was internally braced by a combination of duralumin tubular tie rods and round high-tensile steel tubing. The rounded wing tips were supported by lattice-form spars. The statically-balanced ailerons were divided into three sections, the central ailerons using lattice-form spars while the outer ailerons had spars composed of round tubing; externally, the ailerons had fabric coverings. The wing was braced on either side by four inclined v-struts; these bracing struts were faired with shaped duralumin sheeting, internally held by compact flat plates and U-sections.

In its civilian service configuration, the Laté 521 would transport a maximum of 72 passengers in luxurious conditions. However, typical trans-Atlantic services would normally only carry around 26 passengers, all of which would be upon the lower deck. Larger passenger complements could be carried on the shorter trans-Mediterranean routes for which the design had originally been envisioned to serve. On the lower level, there was a salon occupied by 20 armchairs and tables, along with six deluxe double cabins, each with its own bathroom, and seating for a further 22 passengers, a kitchen, a bar, a lavatory, and a baggage hold. Separate compartments for the wireless operator and navigator are also present on the lower deck. The more compact and narrower upper level of the hull featured seating for 18 passengers, along with a storage compartment, a second kitchen and bar, and another lavatory. The forward section of the upper deck is also where the two flying officers and the commanding officer would be seated. Directly behind the pilots is where the aircraft's flight engineers would be stationed, these engineers could directly access all six engines in-flight via compact walkways housed inside of the wings.

Originally, the Laté 521 was intended to be powered by an arrangement of four 890 kW (1,200 hp) Hispano-Suiza 18Sbr W-18 engines, derived from an existing air racing engine; however, these engines would ultimately never become available. In their place, it was decided to use six Hispano-Suiza 12Ydrs, each capable of 660 kW (890 hp), for the first aircraft. This change involved considerable redesign work and delayed the project's completion. Controlling these engines posed several difficulties; thus the throttles for the six engines use an integral design involving declutchable tips and stirrups, which eased control difficulties and enhancing the aircraft's maneuverability on the water as well.

== Operational history ==
On 10 January 1935, the first Laté 521 performed the type's first flight. Following a number of test flights, a highly-publicised demonstration flight was conducted in December 1935, flying via Dakar to Natal, Brazil, before turning north towards the French West Indies. This long distance flight was timed to deliberately coincide with the 300th year of French rule in the Americas. Shortly after successfully reaching Pensacola, Florida, the aircraft was caught in a hurricane and wrecked. The aircraft was salvaged and returned to France by ship, where it was rebuilt for regular service with flag carrier Air France on the trans-Atlantic routes. Prior to Air France's adoption of the Laté 521, the airline had only been able to carry air mail along some of its long distance routes, and thus had enabled new passenger services to be launched for the first time.

During June 1937, the Laté 521 flew non-stop to Natal before returning to France via the North Atlantic. On 30 December 1937, the type established a new Fédération Aéronautique Internationale (FAI) record, carrying a payload of 18,040 kg (39,770 lb) at an altitude of 2,000 m (6,600 ft) while flying over Biscarrosse, France. (The FAI Bulletin says it had six 485 kW (650 hp) engines at the time.) Having been equipped with more powerful engines, the Laté 521 conducted a further four return flights to New York between May and July 1939. During one of these, pilot Henri Guillaumet flew 5,875 km (3,651 mi) from New York City to Biscarrosse at an average speed of 206 km/h (128 mph), including 2,300 km (1,400 mi) with one engine out.

On the outbreak of the Second World War, the Laté 521 was pressed into service with the French Navy, all aircraft were attached to the flotilla E.6, based in Port-Lyautey, Morocco, where they performed maritime patrol flights over the North Atlantic. After the Armistice of 22 June 1940 between France and Nazi Germany, the aircraft was flown to Berre, near Marseille. The Laté 521 remained at Berre intact up until August 1944 when, following the launch of Operation Dragoon by the Allies to liberate southern France, the aircraft was deliberately destroyed by the retreating German occupying forces.

== Variants ==
Data from:

520
The initial design of the 520 series, powered by 4 × 750 kW (1,000 hp) Hispano-Suiza 18Sbr W-18 engines in tandem pairs.
521 Lieutenant de Vaisseau Paris
The first completed aircraft, powered by 6 × Hispano-Suiza 12Ydrs. Operated by Air France on route proving flights the 521 was militarised in 1939 and operated by the Vichy government until stored at Marignane, finally being destroyed when Axis troops retreated from advancing Allies.
522 Ville de Saint Pierre
The second aircraft of the 520 series, powered by 6 × Hispano-Suiza 12Y-37 engines, had a brief civilian career before being militarised similar to the 521. Operated by the Ministre des Colonies de Vichy, the 522 met a similar fate to the 521, being destroyed by retreating enemy troops in 1944.
523
Three armed maritime patrol aircraft named l'Algol, l'Aldébaran and l'Altair, operated by Vichy French forces.
524
Projected variant of the 521 to have been powered by 8 × CLM Lille 6As opposed-piston 2-stroke diesel engines.
525
Similar to the 524 but powered by 8 x Hispano-Suiza 12Y engines.

== Operators ==
France

- Air France
- Aviation Navale

== Specifications (Laté 521) ==

Data from Latécoère

General characteristics

- Crew: Five + cabin crew
- Capacity: 30–72
- Length: 31.62 m (103 ft 9 in)
- Wingspan: 49.3 m (161 ft 9 in)
- Height: 9.07 m (29 ft 9 in)
- Wing area: 330 m^{2} (3,600 sq ft) plus 53 m^{2} (570 sq ft) for the sponsons
- Empty weight: 18,882 kg (41,628 lb)
- Max takeoff weight: 40,000 kg (88,185 lb)
- Powerplant: 6 × Hispano-Suiza 12Ydrs V-12 liquid-cooled piston engine, 641 kW (860 hp) each (final engine fit)

Performance

- Maximum speed: 261 km/h (162 mph, 141 kn) at 2,000 m (6,600 ft)
- Cruise speed: 210 km/h (130 mph, 110 kn)
- Minimum control speed: 100 km/h (62 mph, 54 kn)
- Range: 4,100 km (2,500 mi, 2,200 nmi)
- Service ceiling: 6,300 m (20,700 ft)
- Rate of climb: 3.7 m/s (730 ft/min)
- Time to altitude: 9 minutes to 2,000 m (6,600 ft)

== See also ==
Aircraft of comparable role, configuration, and era

- Boeing 314 Clipper
- Dornier Do X
- Saunders-Roe Princess

Related lists

- List of aircraft of World War II
- List of flying boats and floatplanes
