= Latécoère 28 =

1927 airliner family by Latécoère

- Three view drawings of Latecoere 28

General information
- Type: Eight-passenger monoplane
- Manufacturer: Forges et Ateliers de Construction Latécoère
- Primary user: Aéropostale

History
- First flight: 1927
- Developed from: Latécoère 26

The Latécoère 28 was a long distance monoplane aircraft designed and produced by the French aircraft manufacturer Latécoère.

First flown in 1927, it had a fixed tailwheel undercarriage and an enclosed cockpit for its crew of two. When configured for airline use, the Latécoère 28 could accommodate up to eight seated passengers. It was produced in both land and floatplane configurations, being marketed towards the civilian market both as a mail plane and passenger airliner.

During its operating life, the Latécoère 28 became the main-stay of Air France's predecessor, Aéropostale, which heavily used the aircraft during the 1930s in its efforts to establish intercontinental air mail services and support French colonialism and French cultural influence during the Interwar period. Its pilots included famous poets and French men of letters, such as Antoine de Saint-Exupéry and Jean Mermoz, along with numerous veteran pilots from the First World War.

== Development ==
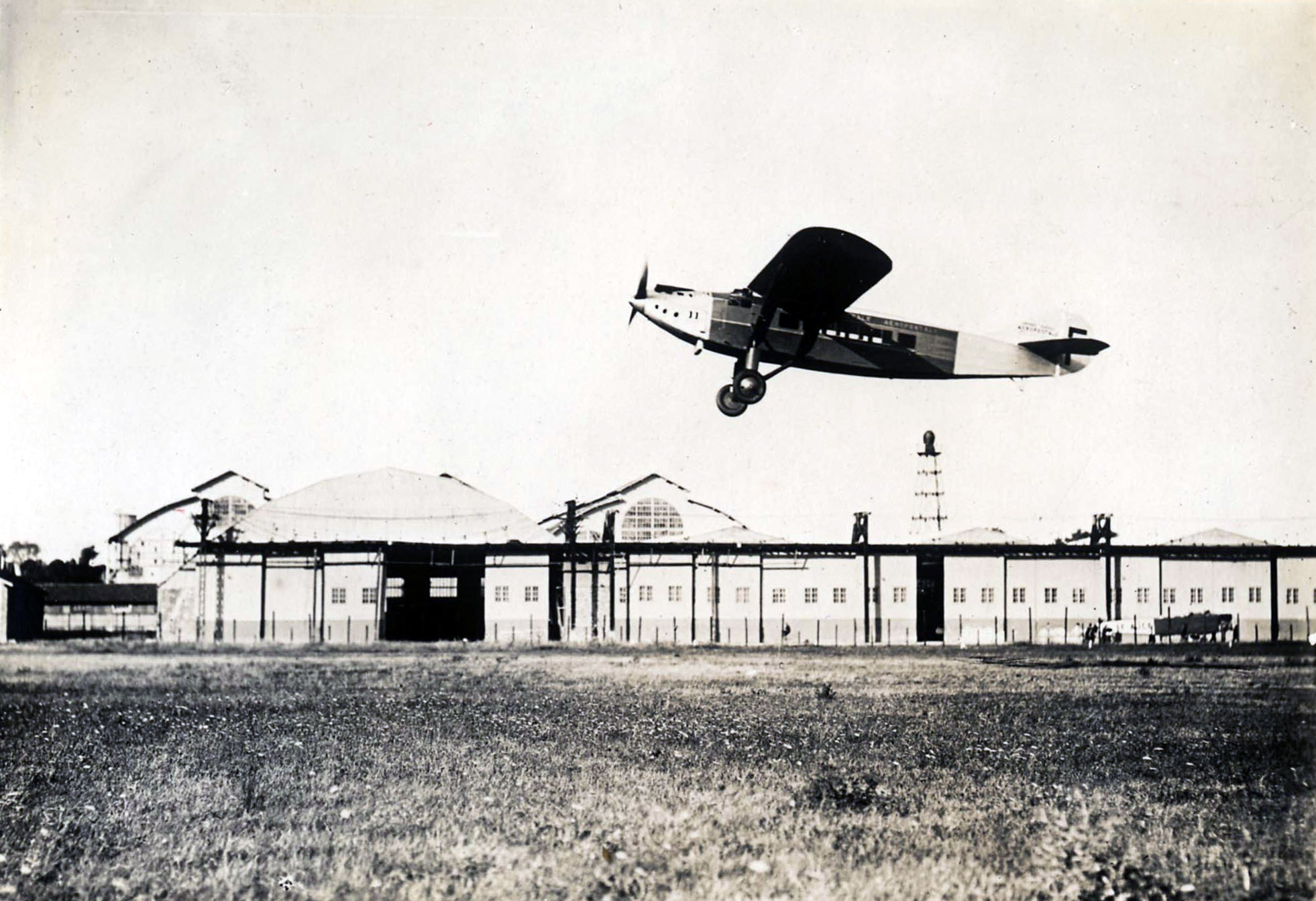
A Latécoère 28 in flight, 1933

The Latécoère 28 was a development of the Latécoère 26. A total of about fifty aircraft of several versions were produced between 1927 and 1932. The seaplane version, the Latécoère 28-3, was the first to make a postal delivery crossing of the South Atlantic when Jean Mermoz flew from Dakar to Natal in 21 hours and a half aboard the Comte-de-La Vaulx (prototype n° 919) on 12 May 1930. Unfortunately, the plane was lost at sea during the return flight (with no loss of life, nor of mail).

Early examples had been furnished with Renault 12Jbr engines; however, all use of this powerplant was quickly substituted for by Hispano Suiza 12, which was capable of providing up to 500 hp (370 kW). The floatplane version was equipped with the Hispano Suiza 12Lbr, which could generate to up 650 hp (480 kW).

== Design ==
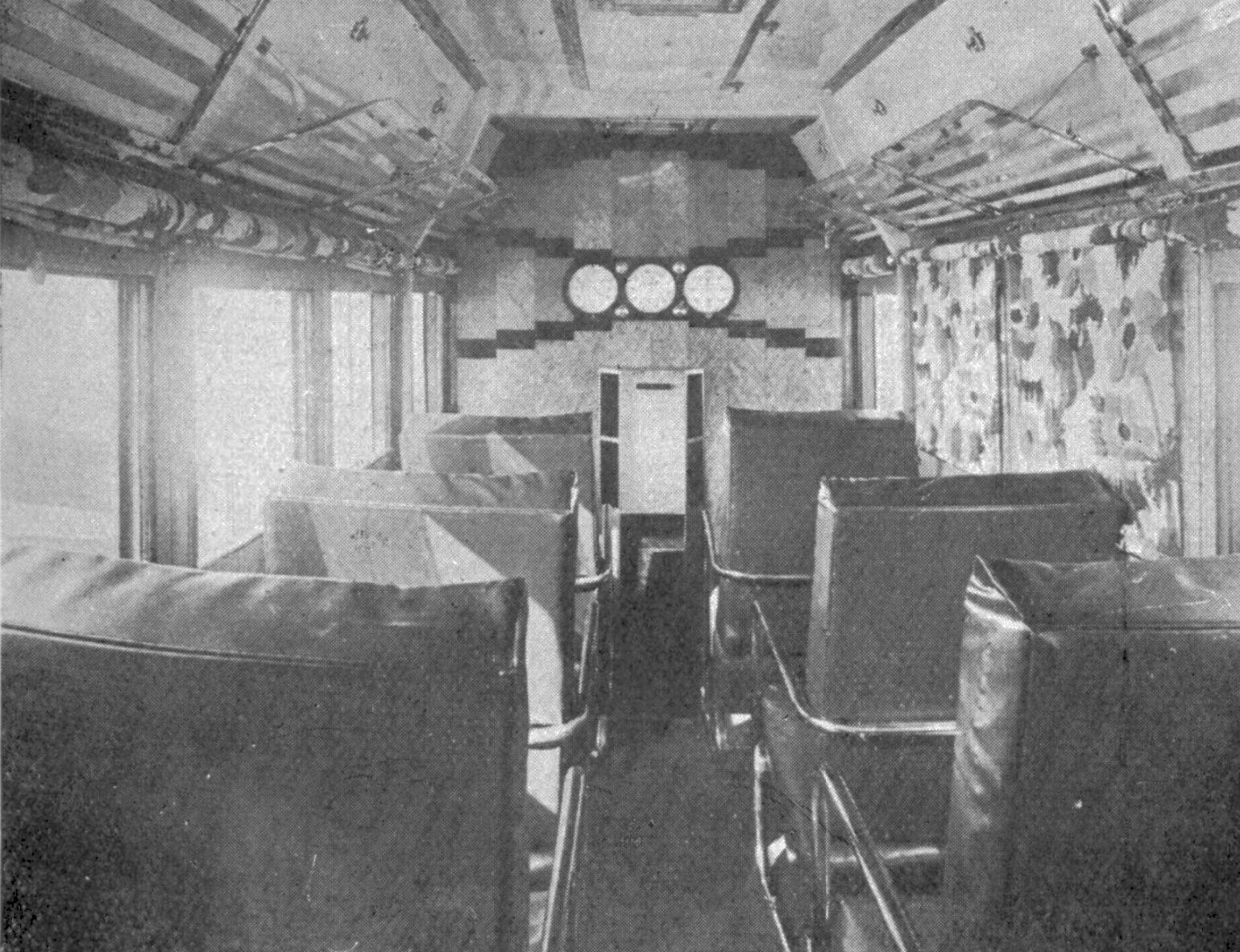
Passenger cabin of a Latécoère 28

The Latécoère 28 was a long-range high-wing single-engined monoplane. The fuselage, which was highly streamlined and largely supported by light-metal tubing, was internally divided into three sections, each with its own distinct structure and function. The main landing gear comprised two independent wheels mounted on axles joined to the fuselage and supported by elastic struts that incorporated shock absorbers. The recoil from landing was absorbed via a light-metal strut in the plane of the axle, supported at one end by the axle's bend and hinged to the fuselage at the other end; atypically strong carbon-injected steel, which was hardened and tempered after machining, was used. A hinged elastic tail skid was also used to dampen the landing forces.

The forwardmost section of the aircraft was the bow, the double tubular framework of which constitutes the engine bed in the form of a girder cradle. Two struts are used to deliver power to the propeller, while various accessories of the engine, including the radiator, fire extinguishers, control lines, fuel piping, and oil tank. Maintenance access to the engine was achieved via a removable aluminium hood. Directly behind the engine was two spaces, the pilot's room and the first baggage hold, the former being above the latter. The pilot's room was provisioned with an ample windshield, and was well ventilated via two sliding overhead doors that was intended to be used for emergency egress if such a circumstance required it; typical access was via a pair of side doors. The chief pilot would be seated on the left, provisioned with an instrument board complete with electric light switches, while the position on the right was equipped with a radio set.

The majority of the central section was divided from the pilot's room via two substantial bulkheads, between which were located the fuel tanks; these bulkheads were also the attachment points for both the wings and landing gear. Aft of the bulkhead was the passenger cabin, to the rear of which was the lavatory and a second baggage hold. Both the doors and windows had reinforced metal frames; a total of ten openable windows, along with washable fabric walls, a carpeted floor, ten baggage nets, and three ceiling lights for night flying were present in the passenger cabin. The rear section comprised a relatively simple arrangement of four girders that supported the tail unit; these were braced with piano wires and enclosed in a light wood cowling.

The wing of the Latécoère 28, which was furnished with a pair of ailerons and elliptical wingtips, was rigidly attached to the fuselage via a set of oblique struts. The structure comprised two spars composed of rectangular metal tubing, which was intentionally lightened via numerous holes and reinforced using riveted channel flanges; the distance between the spars was maintained by metal tubing braced by highly-resistant steel wiring. The ribs, which were triangularly-braced spruce girders with birch plywood gussets, determined the wing's profile via their curvature. Reinforced box ribs gave the wing rigidity of the wing at key attachment points, such as with the fuselage and towards the ends of the ailerons; the wing was primarily attached to the fuselage via four bolts, two for each spar. Each of the ailerons, which had an all-metal framework, were fitted with a light-metal horn. As to achieve the desired profile of the elliptical wingtips, the adjacent ribs were reshaped. In anticipation of a potential wing strike, the wing's design incorporated a damage control measure in the form of the spars terminating at two slightly weaker tip sections that would break off in the event of contact.

The vertical empennage of the tail was outfitted with a triangular fin and a balanced semi-circular rudder. The fin was supported at either end by a cross piece attached to the upper longerons of the fuselage and was braced via four wires running to the triangular horizontal stabilizer. The structure of the tail largely comprised light-metal tubular members and stamped ribs, the majority of which was joined using rivets. The exterior was mainly covered by fabric. Both the rudder and the elevator were balanced. The aircraft's flight controls comprised a rudder bar, a wheel for the ailerons and a control stick for the elevator.

== Operational service ==
The first aircraft were used by Aéropostale on the African mail routes connecting Casablanca and Dakar. The aircraft also inaugurated a Paris-Madrid service. The Latécoère 28 became famous in South America because of the regular mail service it performed between France and Argentina, amongst other destinations. This aircraft's introduction made it possible to send a letter from Paris to Santiago de Chile in what seemed then like an astonishingly short four days. Previously, the mail steamships had taken weeks or months.

The Latécoère 28 was also operated in a military capacity. Venezuela purchased three aircraft for use as bombers while the French government supplied several to the Second Spanish Republic during the Spanish Civil War.

== Variants ==
Laté 28.0
Initial production with a 500 hp (372.85 kW) Renault 12Jbr engine, 17 built (some later converted to 28.1).
Laté 28.1
Further production with a 500 hp (372.85 kW) Hispano-Suiza 12Hbxr engine, 29 built.
Laté 28.2
Mail carrier, one built (n°948).
Laté 28.3
Mail carrier floatplane, five built. Three entered service with Air-France under the erroneous designation Latécoère 28.1/H
Laté 28.3/H
A wheeled landing gear version of the 28.3, one built.
Laté 28.3-I
A passenger version of the 28.3, powered by a 700 hp (521.99 kW) Gnome et Rhône 14Kb Mistral Major radial engine, one built.
Laté 28.4-I
A development of the 28.3 with a 650 hp (484.70 kW) Hispano-Suiza 12Nbr engine, one built
Laté 28.5
Structurally strengthened version with a 650 hp (484.70 kW) Hispano-Suiza 12Nbr engine.
Laté 28.6
For Venezuela powered by a 650 hp (484.70 kW) Hispano-Suiza 12Nbr engine, three built.
Laté 28.8
One 28.0 modified with an enlarged wingspan
Laté 28.9
Three-seat landplane bomber for Venezuela, three built.

== Operators ==
=== Civil ===
Argentina

- Aeropostala Argentina

France

- Aéropostale
- Air France

Venezuela

- Aviacon Aeropostal Venezolana
- Linea Aeropostal Venezolana

=== Military ===
Spanish Republic

- Spanish Republican Air Force

Venezuela

- Venezuelan Air Force

== Specifications (Latécoère 28.0) ==
Data from Latécoère N.A.C.A

General characteristics

- Crew: 2
- Capacity: eight passengers or up to 925kg (2,039lb) of payload
- Length: 13.625 m (44 ft 8 in)
- Wingspan: 19.25 m (63 ft 2 in)
- Height: 3.58 m (11 ft 9 in)
- Wing area: 48.6 m^{2} (523 sq ft)
- Empty weight: 2,166 kg (4,775 lb)
- Gross weight: 3,856 kg (8,501 lb)
- Powerplant: 1 × Renault 12Jb V-12 liquid-cooled piston engine, 373 kW (500 hp)

Performance

- Maximum speed: 222 km/h (138 mph, 120 kn) at sea level
- Cruise speed: 200 km/h (120 mph, 110 kn)
- Range: 4,685 km (2,911 mi, 2,530 nmi)
- Service ceiling: 5,200 m (17,100 ft)
- Rate of climb: 2.04 m/s (402 ft/min)
- Time to altitude: 4,000m in 59 minutes and 38 seconds

== See also ==
Related development

- Laté 26
- Laté 29
- Laté 35

Aircraft of comparable role, configuration, and era

- Focke-Wulf A 17
- Fokker F.VII
- Kalinin K-5
- Nieuport-Delage NiD 540

Related lists

- List of aircraft of the Spanish Republican Air Force
- List of interwar military aircraft
