= Latécoère 340 =

General information
- Type: Medium-range passenger flying boat
- National origin: France
- Manufacturer: Latécoère (La societe industrielle d'aviation Latécoère)
- Designer: Marcel Moine
- Primary user: 1

History
- First flight: February 1930

The Latécoère 340 was a three-engined, parasol winged flying boat designed in 1929 in France for middle-distance, overseas routes. The sole prototype was destroyed early in the testing programme, and no more were built.

== Design and development ==
The Latécoère 340 (sometimes written 34-0) was a three-engined flying boat designed to serve medium-range routes, such as those across the Mediterranean from France to her African colonies. In general appearance it was similar to the Latécoère 21, with a parasol wing bearing two tractor and one central pusher engines, and used sponsons both for stability on the water and extra lift in the air. It was smaller than the Latécoère 21, carrying only five passengers.

The quite thick (13.5%) wings were fabric covered over a metal frame. They were of constant chord out to gently curved tips, each carrying two ailerons. The three 400 hp (298 kW) V-12 water-cooled Hispano Suiza 12 Jb engines were mounted close together on top of the wing and out of the spray in well-streamlined cowlings; those of the forward-facing outer engines slimmed finely to the trailing edge. Each engine drove a two-bladed propeller. Flat radiators were placed on the underside of the upper wing, beneath each motor. The primary attachment of the wings was not to the fuselage but to the sponson tips, by two pairs of parallel steel struts to mid-wing. On each side, another pair of struts went almost vertically from the sponson to the wing below the outer engine. The outer engines were further supported by struts to the upper fuselage longerons, from which also a pair of inverted V struts supported the central engine.

The hull of the Latécoère 340 had a planing bottom with two steps. It was built around a keel and four longerons and provided a mooring position in the nose, an enclosed cabin for pilot and radio operator and a passenger cabin with four windows on each side. Aft of the cabin there was a space for mail. The sponsons, symmetric in cross section and with a thickness/chord ratio of 12.5%, were entirely metal. The fuselage was aluminium covered, tapering towards the tail with decreasing skin thickness. Like the wings, the rear surfaces were metal structures with fabric covering. The tailplane was mounted a little way up the fin, the latter carrying a generous and rounded rudder, its lower edge blending elegantly into the lines of the lower fuselage. The rudder had a trim tab, but neither it nor the elevators had aerodynamic balances.

The Latécoère 340 flew for the first time in February 1930 at Saint-Laurent-de-la-Salanque, piloted by Prévot. During that month and the next, the aircraft's trials went promisingly. It seemed to have the calculated performance and could maintain height under full load on the power of two engines. However, on 2 April 1930 it was demonstrated to a French Navy official. It broke up in the air, killing both Prévot and his mechanic Hoff. The accident was ascribed to pilot error, with the suggestion that in his enthusiasm to demonstrate the aircraft's potential, Prévot exceed the safe speed range. It was the end of the programme, and F-AKDI was the only one built.

== Specifications ==
Data from Cuny 1992, pp. 110

General characteristics

- Crew: 2
- Capacity: 5 passengers
- Length: 14.50 m (47 ft 7 in)
- Wingspan: 23.0 m (75 ft 6 in)
- Height: 4.85 m (15 ft 11 in)
- Wing area: 70 m^{2} (753 sq ft) excluding sponsons
- Empty weight: 3,485 kg (7,683 lb)
- Gross weight: 5,610 kg (12,368 lb) maximum
- Powerplant: 3 × Hispano-Suiza 12 Jb watercooled V-12 , 298 kW (400 hp) each

Performance

- Maximum speed: 232 km/h (144 mph, 125 kn) at sea level
- Service ceiling: 7,400 m (24,278 ft) calculated
