= Groupe Latécoère =

Aircraft company in Toulouse, France

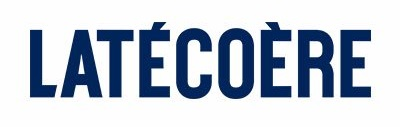
- Type: Public
- Traded as: Euronext: LAT; CAC Small
- Industry: aerospace
- Founded: September 1917
- Founder: Pierre-Georges Latécoère
- Headquarters: Toulouse, France
- Revenue: ▲€756 million (2025)
- Net income: ▼€-32 million (2025)
- Number of employees: 6,000 (2025)

The Groupe Latécoère (French: [ɡʁup latekɔɛʁ]) is an aircraft company based in Toulouse, France. Founded by the aeronautics pioneer Pierre-Georges Latécoère during 1917, the company became well known in its first few decades for its range of seaplanes, such as the six-engined Latécoère 631.

Presently, Groupe Latécoère operates as a major supplier of aerostructures, producing sections of fuselage and doors, having become the second-largest European supplier of onboard electrical wire harnesses and avionics bays through its Latelec subsidiary company. It is currently a member of the CAC Small and participates in all segments of aeronautics: commercial airliners with Airbus and Boeing, regional aircraft with Embraer and Bombardier, business aircraft with Dassault Aviation, as well as military aircraft with Dassault and Airbus.

== History ==
The company has its roots in the First World War; during September 1917, aeronautics pioneer Pierre-Georges Latécoère decided to invest in a series of factories in Toulouse. The business initially focused on the production of military material, such as shells and aircraft. It reportedly delivered roughly 800 aircraft to the French Army.

Following the end of the conflict, Latécoère engaged in the design and manufacture of numerous seaplanes. Perhaps the most significant of these was the six-engined Latécoère 631, a large passenger aircraft designed for transatlantic journeys. Billed as being The Ship of the Skies, the 631 performed its maiden flight during 1939; a total of 10 aircraft were completed. It was the largest production seaplane ever to be built, having a wingspan roughly one-third larger than the Short Sunderland, another contemporary large seaplane. The type was performing regular passenger services up, until September 1955.

By the turn of the century, Groupe Latécoère was principally known for the manufacture of aircraft equipment and aerostructures production. In the equipment sector, it is a leading manufacturer of avionics bays, onboard electrical harnesses, and closed-circuit television (CCTV) systems. Aerostructure work includes the production of fuselage sections, including both passenger and cargo doors, as a subcontractor to multiple aircraft manufacturers, such as Airbus, Boeing, Dassault Aviation, Bombardier Aerospace and Embraer. Furthermore, Groupe Latécoère provides design and engineering services for select clients. In addition to the firm's primary base in France, it operates at locations throughout the world, including the Czech Republic, Romania, the United States, Spain, the United Kingdom, Tunisia, Mexico and Brazil. Latecoere SA operates through a number of subsidiary businesses, including Letov Kbely, Latecoere do Brasil, and LaTelec, among others.

During the early 2010s, there were rumours that the British industrial conglomerate GKN would potentially acquire Groupe Latécoère. In early 2015, as a consequence of the company's high debt ratio, the firm restructured its operations, resulting in a significant drop in debt levels via an equity exchange, opening itself up to greater foreign ownership in the process. By September 2017, the company's financial situation had improved to such an extent that it was reportedly once again looking to expand its aerospace portfolio via acquisitions. That same year, it also committed to the establishment of a new company headquarters.

In early April 2019, it was announced that private equity firm Searchlight Capital had agreed to purchase a 26 percent stake in Groupe Latécoère in exchange for $106.8 million. By December 2019, the buying of additional shares had given Searchlight a controlling stake in the firm; this generated some political controversy over the firm's now-foreign ownership.

== Aircraft products ==
- Latécoère 1* (1918) Two-seat fighter; designation may have also been used for license-built Breguet 14s.
- Latécoère 2 (1918) Salmson 2s built under license.
- Latécoère 3 (1919) Two-seat, single-engine prototype transport and postal biplane.
- Latécoère 4 (1920) 15-passenger, three-engine prototype passenger biplane.
- Latécoère 5 (1924) Three-engine prototype bomber biplane developed from the Latécoère 4.
- Latécoère 6 (1924) Four-engine bomber biplane.
- Latécoère 7* (1922) High-wing monoplane bomber.
- Latécoère 8 (1922) Five-passenger, single-engine biplane airliner.
- Latécoère 9* (1922) Four-engine biplane.
- Latécoère 10* (1922) Four-engine monoplane.
- Latécoère 11* (1922) Three-engine transport/COIN aircraft
- Latécoère 12* (1922) Single-engine transport/COIN aircraft.
- Latécoère 13* (1922) Twin-engine airliner.
- Latécoère XIV (1923) High-wing, cantilever monoplane.
- Latécoère 14 (1924) Three-passenger, parasol-wing, single-engine airliner.
- Latécoère 15 (1924) Six-passenger, twin-engine monoplane airliner.
- Latécoère 15M (1924) twin-engine transport seaplane, converted from a Latécoère 15.
- Latécoère 16 (1924) Four-passenger, single engine airliner developed from the Latécoère 14.
- Latécoère 17 (1924) Four-passenger, single engine monoplane airliner.
- Latécoère 18 Twin-engine biplane transport flying boat
- Latécoère 19 (1925) Twin-engine prototype monoplane bomber developed from the Latécoère 15.
- Latécoère 20* (1926) Air ambulance derivative of the Latécoère 19.
- Latécoère 21 (1926) Six-passenger, twin-engine monoplane flying boat airliner.
- Latécoère 22 (1927) Single-seat, single-engine mailplane.
- Latécoère 23 (1927) Eight-passenger, twin-engine monoplane flying boat transport developed from the Latécoère 21.
- Latécoère 24 (1927) Three-engine parasol-wing monoplane flying boat, intended as a transatlantic mailplane.
- Latécoère 25 (1926) Five-passenger, single-engine airliner.
- Latécoère 26 (1926) Single-engine mailplane.
- Latécoère 27* (1927) Unbuilt improved version of the Latécoère 24.
- Latécoère 28 (1927) Eight-passenger, single engine long-haul monoplane airliner and mailplane developed from the Latécoère 26.
- Latécoère 29 (I)* Three-engine flying boat
- Latécoère 29 (II) (1930) Torpedo-bomber version of the Latécoère 28.
- Latécoère 30* Three-engine flying boat.
- Latécoère 32 (1928) Four-passenger, twin-engine monoplane flying boat airliner and mailplane developed from the Latécoère 23.
- Latécoère 101* (1940) Four-engine push-pull flying boat.
- Latécoère 124* (1945) Version of Latécoère 101 with four single engines.
- Latécoère 130* Derivative of the Latécoère 631.
- Latécoère 140* (1945) Four-engine airliner with Latécoère 631 wing.
- Latécoère 150* (1943-1948) Four-engine transatlantic flying boat.
- Latécoère 160* (1945) 52-passenger, four-engine transatlantic airliner with Latécoère 631 wing; landplane derivative of the Latécoère 150.
- Latécoère 170* (1945) Six-engine reconnaissance flying boat.
- Latécoère 180* Eight-engine development of the Latécoère 170.
- Latécoère 190*
- Latécoère 200*
- Latécoère 210* Six-engine airliner.
- Latécoère 220*
- Latecoere 225 (1984) Single-seat microlight amphibian
- Latécoère 255*
- Latécoère 270*
- Latécoère 290 (1931) Single-engine floatplane torpedo bomber.
- Latécoère 291* Derivative of the 290.
- Latécoère 292* Strengthened, reduced span version of 291.
- Latécoère 292/2* As 292 but with full-span 290 wings.
- Latécoère 293 (1932-1933) Torpedo floatplane.
- Latécoère 294 Torpedo floatplane, began as a converted 292.
- Latécoère 295* As 291, but with full-span 290 wings.
- Latécoère 296 (1937) Torpedo floatplane, 294 wings with 294 rear fuselage.
- Latécoère 297* Lightweight version of the 296.
- Latécoère 298 (1936) Single-engine floatplane torpedo and dive bomber, successor to the 29.
- Latécoère 299 (1939) Landplane reconnaissance-torpedo bomber version of the Latécoère 298.
- Latécoère 300 (1931) Four-engine flying boat mailplane.
- Latécoère 301 (1934-1935) Version of the Latécoère 300 for Air France.
- Latécoère 302 (1936) Maritime reconnaissance version of the Latécoère 300
- Latécoère 310* Single-engine biplane seaplane
- Latécoère 330* Three-engine flying boat.
- Latécoère 340 (1930) Five-passenger, three-engine medium range flying boat airliner.
- Latécoère 350 (1931) Ten-passenger, three-engine airliner developed from the Latécoère 28.
- Latécoère 360* (1930) High-wing trimotor transport.
- Latécoère 370* (1930) Enlarged version of the Latécoère 350.
- Latécoère 380 (1930) Twin-engine long-range flying boat mailplane.
- Latécoère 381 (1934) Maritime patrol version of the Latécoère 380.
- Latécoère 382*
- Latécoère 383*
- Latécoère 384*
- Latécoère 385*
- Latécoère 386*
- Latécoère 410* (1929) Single-engine reconnaissance flying boat.
- Latécoère 420* (1929) Four-engine reconnaissance flying boat.
- Latécoère 430* (1930s) Four-engine sesquiplane torpedo bomber seaplane.
- Latécoère 440 (1931) Single-engine floatplane coastal defense aircraft developed from the Latécoère 28.
- Latécoère 441* Version with Gnome-Rhone 14Kbr engine.
- Latécoère 442* Light bomber floatplane.
- Latécoère 443* Light bomber landplane, basically a 442 with landing wheels.
- Latécoère 460* (1931) Three-engine transport.
- Latécoère 470* (1930) Single-engine, low-wing touring aircraft.
- Latécoère 480* (1930) Twin-boom, four-engine airliner.
- Latécoère 490 (1931) Single-engine, two-seat prototype reconnaissance monoplane.
- Latécoère 491 (1932) Second prototype of the Latécoère 490, slightly longer but lighter.
- Latécoère 492* Version with glazed gunner's enclosure.
- Latécoère 493* Version with a supercharged Hispano-Suiza 12X engine.
- Latécoère 500 (1930) Twin-engine long-range flying boat mailplane.
- Latécoère 501 (1932) Airliner version of the Latécoère 500.
- Latécoère 510* (1929) Single-engine, high-wing monoplane fighter.
- Latécoère 520* (1930-1933) Initial design of the Latécoère 521.
- Latécoère 521 (1935) 30 to 72-passenger, six-engine large long-range flying boat airliner, militarized during WWII.
- Latécoère 522 (1939) Passenger flying boat, militarized during WWII.
- Latécoère 523 (1938) Maritime patrol version of the Latécoère 521.
- Latécoère 524* (1936) Eight-engine version.
- Latécoère 525* (1936) Eight-engine version.
- Latécoère 530* (1930) Four-engine, high-wing monoplane bomber.
- Latécoère 531* Floatplane version of the Latécoère 530.
- Latécoère 550 Four-engine floatplane torpedo bomber.
- Latécoère 560* (1932) Four-engine flying boat.
- Latécoère 570* (1932) Four-engine flying boat.
- Latécoère 570 (1939) Twin-engine prototype medium bomber.
- Latécoère 580* (1934) Three-engine parasol monoplane flying boat.
- Latécoère 581* Development of Latécoère 581, became the Latécoère 582.
- Latécoère 582 (1935) Three-engine long-range flying boat patrol aircraft.
- Latécoère 590* (1934) Aircraft study
- Latécoère 600* (1932-1933) Four-engine flying boat.
- Latécoère 601*
- Latécoère 602*
- Latécoère 610* (1935) four-engine reconnaissance flying boat for the French Navy
- Latécoère 611 (1940) Prototype four-engine maritime reconnaissance flying boat.
- Latécoère 612* Version with Pratt & Whitney R-1830 engines.
- Latécoère 613* Planned 611/612 variant.
- Latécoère 614* Planned 611/612 variant.
- Latécoère 615* Planned 611/612 variant.
- Latécoère 616* Planned 611/612 variant.
- Latécoère 617* Planned 611/612 variant.
- Latécoère 620* (1936-1936) 20-passenger, four-engine North Atlantic flying boat.
- Latécoère 630* (1936) Six-engine passenger flying boat, developed into the Latécoère 631.
- Latécoère 631 (1937) 46-passenger, six-engine large long-range flying boat airliner
- Latécoère 632* Planned 631 variant.
- Latécoère 633* Planned 631 variant.
- Latécoère 634* Planned 631 variant.
- Latécoère 635* Planned 631 variant.
- Latécoère 636* Planned 631 variant.
- Latécoère 637* Planned 631 variant.
- Latécoère 638* Planned 631 variant.
- Latécoère 639* Planned 631 variant.
- Latécoère 640* (1936) Six-engine long-range flying boat.
- Latécoère 670* (1938) Low-wing fighter.
- Latécoère 671* Gull-wing floatplane derivative of the Latécoère 670.
- Latécoère 672* Floatplane derivative of the Latécoère 670
- Latécoère 673* Floatplane fighter derivative of the Latécoère 670.
- Latécoère 675* (1938) Single-engine, low-wing fighter.
- Latécoère 703* (1949) Twin-engine amphibian transport.
- Latécoère 710 Derivative of Latécoère 631 with pressurized cabin and R-2800 engines.
- Latécoère 730* (1950) Twin-engine high-wing transport.
- Latécoère 740* Single-engine transport.
- Latécoère 780* (1951) Twin-engine, low-wing jet transport.
- Latécoère 790* (1951) Twin-engine, high-wing jet transport.
- Latécoère 800* (1951) Three-engine, low-wing jetliner.
- Latécoère 810* Seaplane jet trainer
- Latécoère 820* Twin-engine COIN aircraft.
- Latécoère 830*
- Latécoère 850*
- Latécoère 860*
- Latécoère 870*
- Latécoère 880*
- Latécoère 900* (1940) Development of Latécoère 631 with eight tandem engines and 250 ton MTOW.

aircraft marked * were projects only

== Missile products for the French Navy ==
- Malaface
- Malafon

== Current products ==
- Airbus A330 A340 (mid-fuselage upper shell)
- Airbus A340/500-600 (mid-fuselage upper shell and lower nose section)
- Airbus A380 (passenger doors, bulk cargo doors and lower nose section)
- Airbus A320 (passenger doors)
- Boeing 787 (passenger doors)
- Bombardier CRJ 700/900 (bulk cargo door)
- Embraer ERJ 170/175/190/195 (passenger doors, emergency exit door and forward and aft fuselage barrel section)
- Dassault Falcon 50 EX (Rear fuselage section)
- Dassault Falcon 7X (baggage door and rear fuselage section)
- Dassault Falcon 900 B/EX (Rear fuselage section)
- Boom Overture (electrical system)

== Current leadership ==
- Chairman of the Board of Directors: Thierry Mootz
- CEO: André-Hubert Roussel

== In popular culture ==
The name Latécoère is part of a "mystique" in France around the beginning of aviation and adventurers. It is part of a famous song by Henri Salvador, "Jardin d'Hiver", in its 3rd verse :

"Je voudrais du Fred Astaire
Revoir un Latécoère
Je voudrais toujours te plaire
Dans mon jardin d'hiver"

A possibly even more popular (and arguably very gross) reference is found in Lola Rastaquouère, a song by Serge Gainsbourg, a famous and controversial French artist:

"Comment oses-tu me parler d'amour toi, hein
Toi qui n'as pas connu Lola Rastaquouère
Je lui faisais le plein comme au Latécoère
Qui décolle en vibrant vers les cieux africains"

Latécoère is mentioned by name in the first sentence of Antoine de Saint Exupéry's famous autobiographical work, Wind, Sand, and Stars, (1936) - from the English translation:

"In 1926 I was enrolled as student airline pilot by the Latécoère Company, the predecessors of Aéropostale (now Air France) in the operation of the line between Toulouse, in southwestern France, and Dakar, in French West Africa."
