= Latécoère 25 =

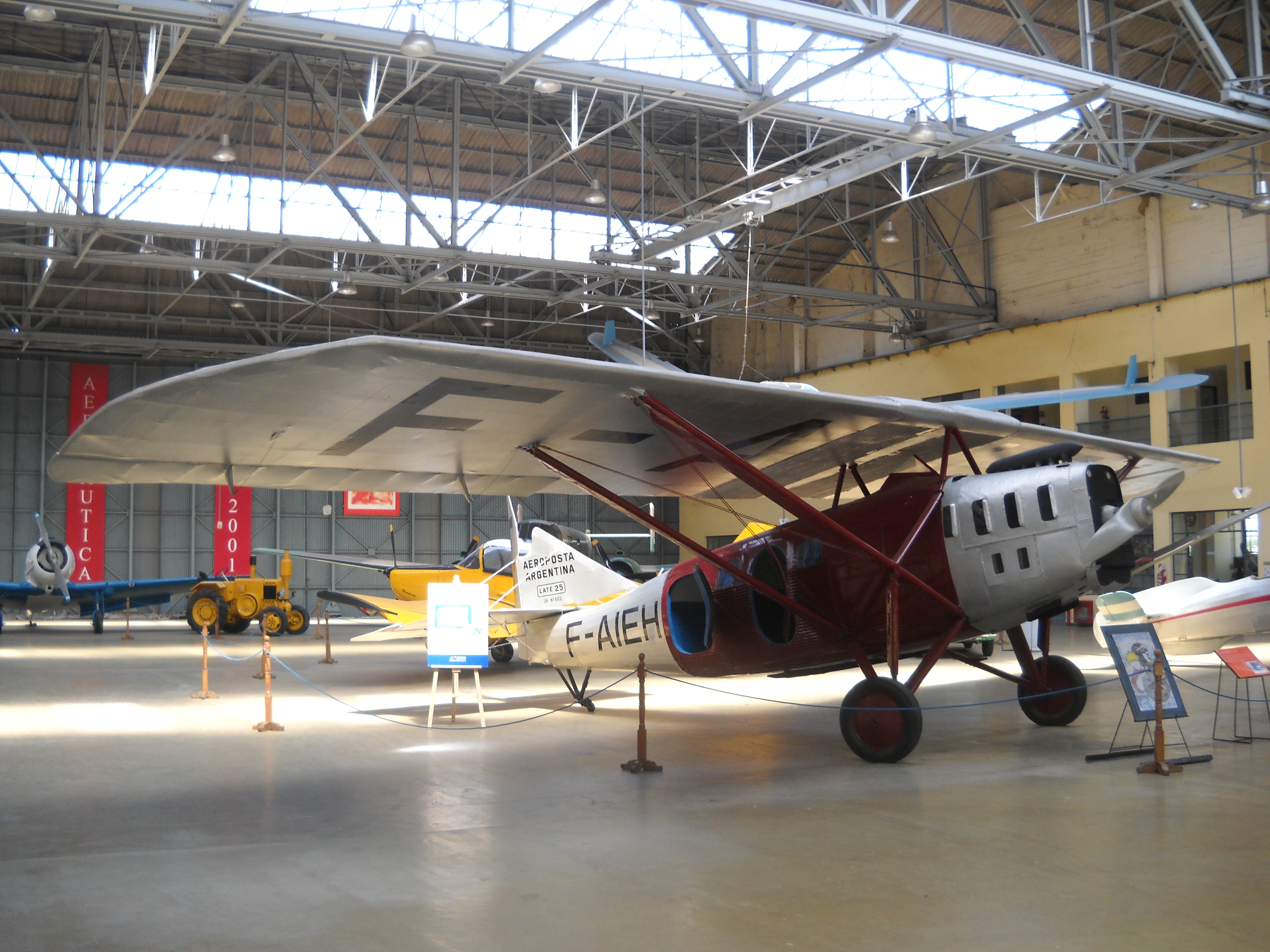
- Preserved Latecoere 25 displayed at the Museo Nacional de Aeronáutica de Argentina. It wears the markings of Aeroposta Argentina.

General information
- Type: Airliner
- National origin: France
- Manufacturer: Latécoère
- Primary user: Lignes Aériennes Latécoère
- Number built: >50

History
- First flight: February 1926

The Latécoère 25 is a French airliner built in 1925 for use on Latécoère's own airline and its subsidiaries. Essentially a refined version of the Latécoère 17 with an enlarged wingspan, it supplanted that type in production and then in service.

== Operational history ==
As Lignes Aériennes Latécoère increasingly shifted its emphasis from carrying passengers to carrying airmail, the Latécoère 25 found its definitive role as a mail plane, and was widely used in establishing the line's South American services. Airlines which operated the type included Aeroposta Argentina. Like the Latécoère 17, it was a conventional parasol-wing monoplane with enclosed seating for passengers and an open cockpit for the pilot.

One Latécoère 25 was involved in a celebrated incident when it made a forced landing high in the Andes. Hitherto, flights between Buenos Aires and Santiago made a 1,000 km (620 mi; 540 nmi) detour to avoid the mountains. On 2 March 1929, while searching for a safe route across the range, a Latécoère 25 piloted by Jean Mermoz was caught in a downdraught and forced down onto a plateau just 300 m (980 ft) across at an altitude of 4,000 m (13,000 ft). With his mechanic Alexandre Collenot and passenger, Count Henry de La Vaulx, Mermoz spent the next four days repairing and lightening the aircraft and making a clear path from it to the edge of the precipice. He then rolled it off the edge, diving to attain airspeed, and successfully reached Santiago.

== Survivors ==
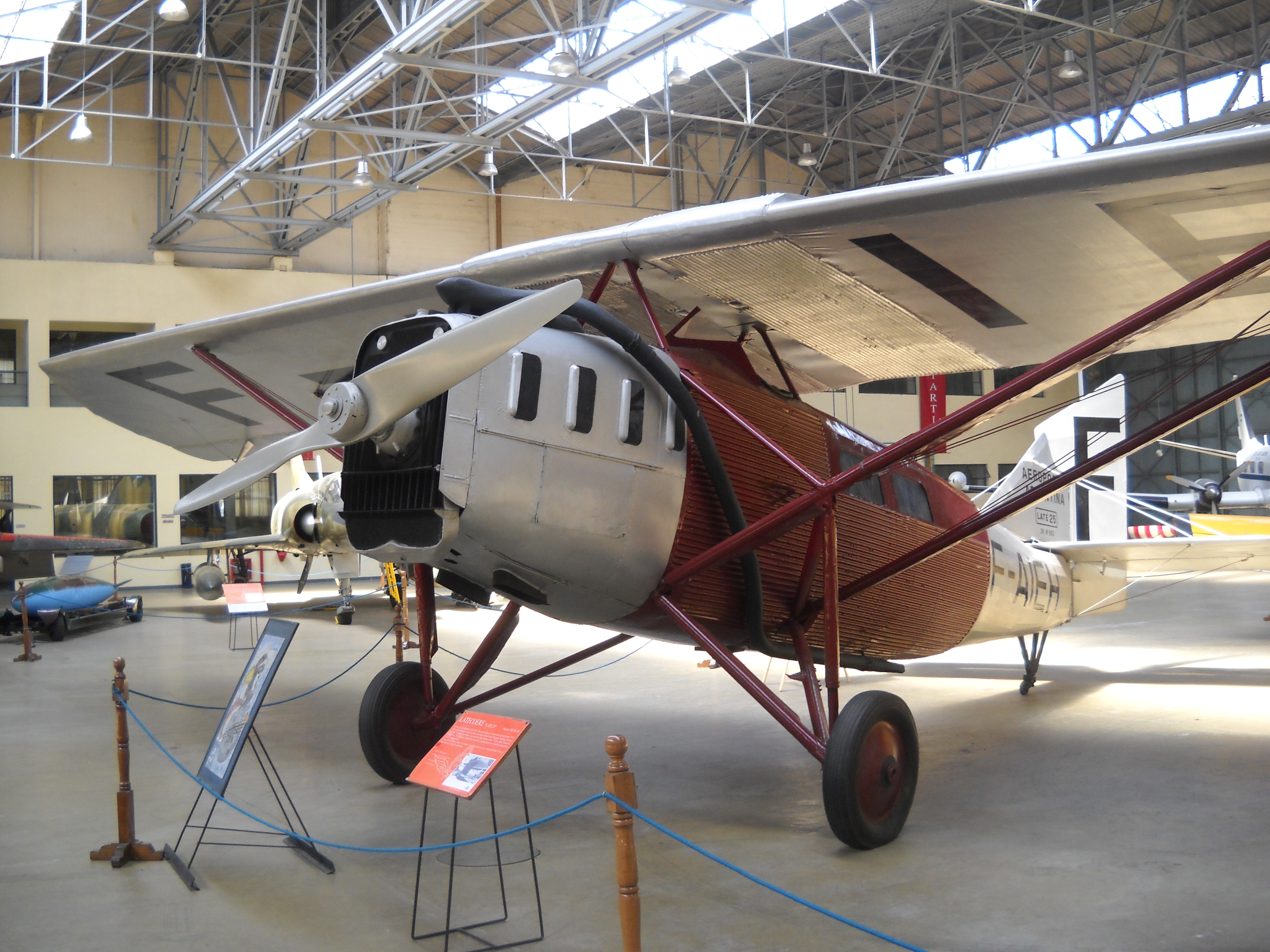
Left side view of preserved Latécoère 25.

The only surviving example of a Latécoère 25 is preserved in the Museo Nacional de Aeronáutica de Argentina in Morón. It wears the markings of Aeroposta Argentina.

== Variants ==
Latécoère 25
Latécoère 25-2R
production aircraft

== Specifications (Laté 25) ==
Data from Jane's all the World's Aircraft 1928

General characteristics

- Crew: 1
- Capacity: 5 passengers; 1,068 kg (2,355 lb) useful load
- Length: 9.45 m (31 ft 0 in)
- Wingspan: 17.4 m (57 ft 1 in)
- Height: 3.7 m (12 ft 2 in)
- Wing area: 48.6 m^{2} (523 sq ft)
- Empty weight: 1,650 kg (3,638 lb)
- Gross weight: 3,283 kg (7,238 lb)
- Fuel capacity: 565 kg (1,246 lb)
- Powerplant: 1 × Renault 12Ja V-12 water-cooled piston engine, 340 kW (450 hp)
- Propellers: 2-bladed fixed pitch propeller

Performance

- Maximum speed: 192 km/h (119 mph, 104 kn)
- Stall speed: 90 km/h (56 mph, 49 kn)
- Range: 850 km (530 mi, 460 nmi)
- Service ceiling: 4,200 m (13,800 ft)
- Time to altitude: 4,000 m (13,000 ft) in 44 minutes
- Wing loading: 67.5 kg/m^{2} (13.8 lb/sq ft)
- Power/mass: 0.1027 kW/kg (0.0625 hp/lb)
