= Latécoère 380 =

General information
- Type: Flying boat mail plane
- National origin: France
- Manufacturer: Latécoère
- Primary user: Aéropostale
- Number built: 5

History
- First flight: 24 August 1930

The Latécoère 380 was a flying boat aircraft designed and produced by the French aircraft manufacturer Latécoère. It was designed for use on Aéropostale's mail routes to South America, the aircraft subsequently saw military service as a maritime patrol aircraft.

The Latécoère 380 was a largely conventional flying boat design, being a parasol-wing monoplane equipped with sponsons set either side of the hull. It was powered by a pair of Hispano-Suiza 12Ydrs engines installed in a tandem push-pull paired arrangement. During September 1931, the first aircraft was used to set six world seaplane records, including three speed-with-load-over-distance records and a closed circuit distance-with-load record of 2,208 km (1,372 mi). A second mail plane was constructed soon afterwards, while a further three military-orientated flying boats, designated Latécoère 381, followed in 1934.

== Design ==
The Latécoère 380 was a twin-engined sesquiplane flying boat designed for the long distance carriage of air mail. It was parasol-wing monoplane, said wing being mounted roughly one meter above the hull on a vertical cabane that was laterally braced by two pairs of struts and longitudinally by two diagonal struts. The lower wing was divided into two parts and had a medium—thick profile that increased the lateral stability of the flying boat while on the water as well as during its take—off run; this profile also served to distribute the stresses from the struts.

The aircraft features an all-metal wing structure that consisted of two box spars set 2.2 m apart, tubular lattice ribs, and compression members that were braced by steel wires. Each part of the lower wing has two I spars, lattice ribs, and a light metal covering; the exterior of the wing was mainly covered by fabric. The wing is furnished with automatically actuated two-part ailerons, which were furnished with narrow balancing flaps that ran along nearly their entire trailing edges. The horizontal empennage featured a sizable stabilizer, which was braced via four streamlined steel wires and two N struts; it also had a two—part elevator. The vertical empennage had a fin and a rudder equipped with compact balancing flaps embedded into the trai1ing edges. Both the elevator and rudder were actuated via flexible controls, the pilot could also adjust the balancing flaps at any time during flight. All tail surfaces were supported by duralumin frames and covered with fabric.

The Latécoère 380's hull, which was composed entirely of lightweight metals, featured a relatively sharp prow towards its base that widens toward the top. It has two steps, one closer to the stem that assisted with taking off while the second aft step was used for alighting. The hull's structure consisted of numerous frames that were joined by the keel, along with various keelsons and stringers to which the light metal exterior was riveted to. The frames, keel, and keelsons had webs of sheet dualumin with riveted flanges; the frames were supported by inner tubular frames that were sometimes reinforced using triangular frames. Four bulkheads divided the hull into five compartments, which were provisioned with automatically closing doors. The aircraft's exterior was protected against the corrosive sea water via multiple measures, such as an oxidizing bath, a coat of white lead, and all fittings and joints being designed to be water-tight. Extensive use of tubular rivets was made throughout the aircraft's assembly.

The internal volume of the hull was divided into various compartments. The forward most compartment functioned as the manoeuvring port while on the water, having been furnished with mooring ropes, a grapnel, floating anchor, and a trap door. To the aft of this was the primary baggage hold, followed by the pilot's room; this space featured sliding side and overhead windows, and could be equipped with dual flying controls. The radio room was directly behind this compartment, being equipped with apparatus for both longwave and shortwave radio sets along with radiogoniometric equipment, batteries, antenna reel, map holders, and reserve provisions. The next compartment contained a passageway, the space to either side of which accommodated the aircraft's main fuel tanks, that led to a relatively well ventilated crew cabin with multiple portholes; two berths and a single seat were typically installed in this space so that crew members could rest while off-duty. The rearmost compartments contained a lavatory and another baggage hold.

The Latécoère 380 was powered by a pair of Hispano-Suiza 12Ydrs engines, each of which were rated to produce 650 hp, but were capable of providing a maximum of 740 hp at 2,100 rpm if circumstances required. These engines were mounted inside two boxes, positioned in tandem above the centre of the wing, that were supported by a lattice girder. Both these boxes and the engine cowling were composed of sheet duralumin. Inspection of the engines was facilitated via an opening in the wing, directly over the hull and between the engines. Cooling was achieved via radiators fitted to the lower side of the wing; these were sized as to be sufficient to effectively function even under the tropical conditions. Fuel was housed within duralurnin tanks located in a special compartment inside of the hull, along with various control cocks and a hand pump; these tanks were provisioned a mechanism to rapidly dump fuel mid-flight during an emergency. The oil tanks are located within the engine cowling while the oil radiators was positioned at either side of the engine nacelle.

== Variants ==
- Latécoère 380 - mailplane version (2 built)
- Latécoère 381 - maritime patrol version (3 built). Armed with twin 7.5 mm Darne machine guns in three positions, and 300 kg (660 lb) of bombs on underwing racks.

=== Unbuilt variants ===
- Latécoère 382 - tandem Hispano engines, weights and performance similar to Latécoère 381.
- Latécoère 383 - 'Un Hydravion d'exploration', with reduced span and wing area and four 350 hp Gnome-Rhône 7Kd engines mounted fore and aft of the wing in tandem pairs. The cabin was enlarged and fitted out as living quarters.
- Latécoère 383 bis - The Latécoère 383 fitted with Latécoère 381 wings.
- Latécoère 384 - The designation of the Latécoère 383 fitted with four 350 hp Hispano-Suiza 9Qa engines.
- Latécoère 384 bis - The designation of the Latécoère 383 bis fitted with four 350 hp Hispano-Suiza 9Qa engines.
- Latécoère 385 - The designation of the Latécoère 383/4 fitted with three 500 hp Gnome-Rhône 9Kbr engines, two tractor and one pusher in wing mounted nacelles.
- Latécoère 386 - The designation of the Latécoère 381 fitted with three 700 hp Gnome-Rhone 14Kbr engines, two tractor and one pusher in wing mounted nacelles.

== Operators ==
France

- Aéronavale
  - Escadrille 3E3 (Saint-Raphaël, 1934)
- Aéropostale

== Specifications (Laté 380) ==
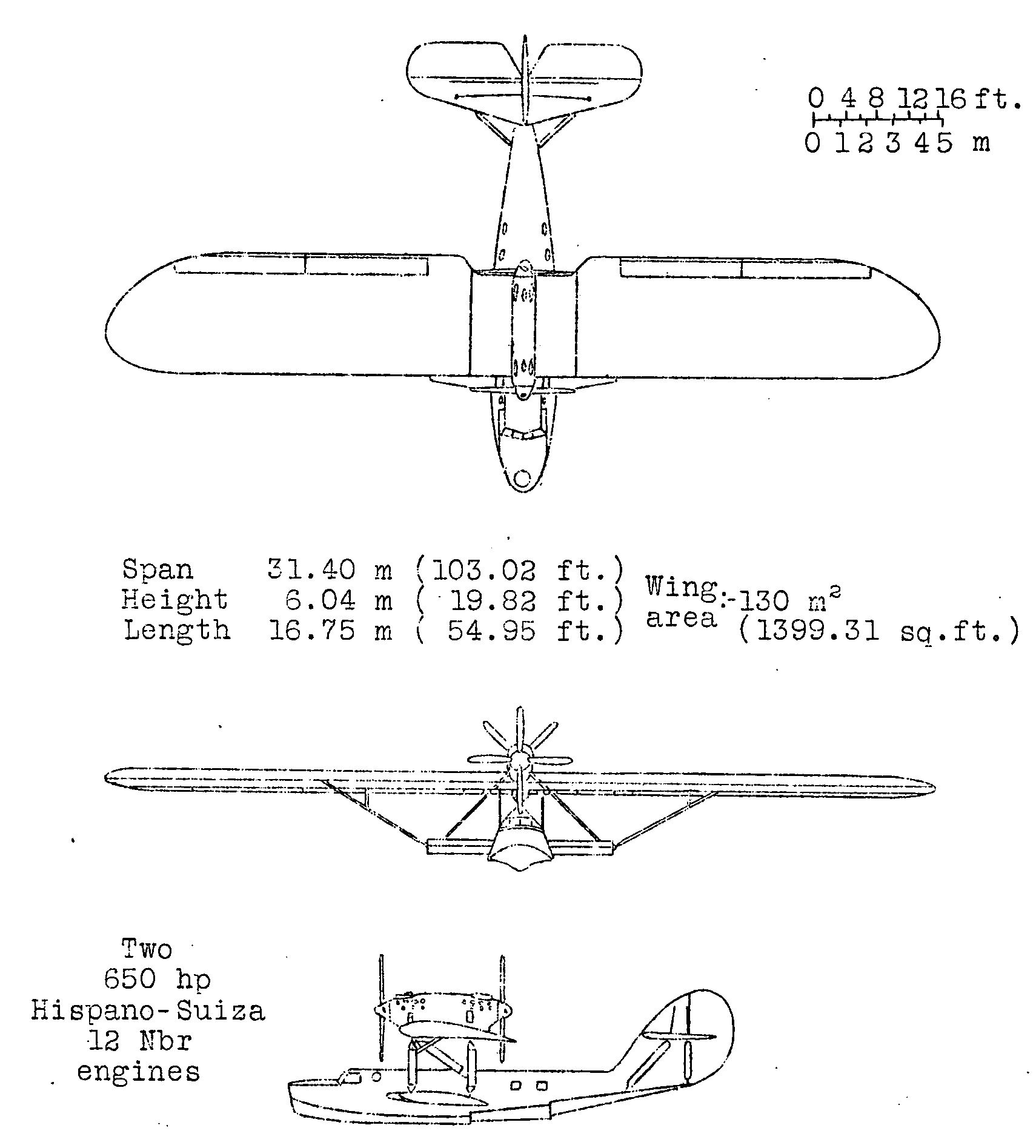
Laté 380 3-view drawing from NACA Aircraft Circular No.136

Data from N.A.C.A

General characteristics

- Crew: Three
- Length: 17.20 m (61 ft 5 in)
- Wingspan: 31.40 m (103 ft 0 in)
- Wing area: 130.0 m^{2} (1,400 sq ft)
- Empty weight: 5,475 kg (12,070 lb)
- Gross weight: 9,475 kg (20,889 lb)
- Powerplant: 2 × Hispano-Suiza 12Ydrs , 511 kW (685 hp) each

Performance

- Maximum speed: 209 km/h (130 mph, 110 kn)
- Range: 4,000 km (2,190 mi, 1,900 nmi)
- Service ceiling: 4,700 m (15,400 ft)
