= Latécoère 350 =

Type of aircraft

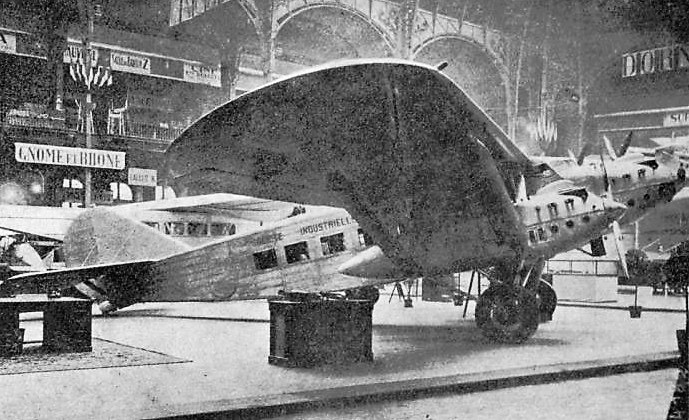

General information
- Type: Passenger transport
- National origin: France
- Manufacturer: Latécoère (La societe industrielle d'aviation Latécoère)
- Designer: Marcel Moine
- Number built: 1

History
- First flight: 2 February 1931

The Latécoère 350 was a trimotor development of the Latécoère 28, a successful single-engined French monoplane of around 1930. The three engines were intended to provide the reliability needed for overnight flights, but the 350 came out very overweight. Only one was built.

== Design and development ==
The Latécoère 350, or 35–0 as it was first called, was a direct development of the successful single-engined passenger carrying Latécoère 28. To increase cruising speed and, in particular to provide reliability for night flying, the new design had three engines. Apart from the immediate changes this involved and a modest increase in wingspan, the 350 and the 28 had much in common, both in structural detail and in general appearance. Both were high wing, strut braced monoplanes with enclosed cockpits and fixed undercarriages. The two extra engines of the 350 were mounted at the ends of stub wings, more streamlined support structures than lifting surfaces, which extended horizontally from the lower fuselage longerons. Each was further stabilised by a pair of struts from the upper part of the engine mounting to the wing roots. The outer engines were mounted as close together as possible, to minimize the couple resulting from the loss of power of one of them. They were housed in long, well streamlined cowlings that reached back as far as the wing trailing edge. The third engine was in the nose, as in the Latécoère 28. All the engines were 400 hp (298 kW) Hispano-Suiza 12Jb V-12 twelve water-cooled units. Three separate radiators for them were fixed under the stub wing.

The wings had constant chord with roughly elliptical tips, with roots joining the upper longerons. On each side, a pair of streamlined struts from the front and rear wing spars at mid-span transmitted lift loads to the end of the stub wing. There was another, slighter pair of struts from each engine mounting vertically to the wing. The wing structure was mostly metal, with some wooden components, then fabric covered. Each wing carried a pair of ailerons with trim tabs to reduce control loads. The fuselage was built around the usual four metal longerons and covered with an aluminium skin. Pilot and co-pilot sat side by side with dual control in an enclosed cabin just ahead of the leading edge, with fuselage windows on either side for lateral and downward vision. Access to the large passenger cabin, 4.60 m long, was via a radio compartment. The cabin seated ten passengers, five down each side with their own window. At the back were baggage spaces and toilet facilities. Passengers entered by a port-side door and luggage loaded through a door on the other side.

The empennage was very similar to that of the Latécoère 28, with a nearly triangular tailplane carrying split, tabbed elevators. The fin was also triangular, with a semi-circular, unbalanced but tabbed rudder. The undercarriage units were mounted at the end of each stub-wing, giving it a wide 5.70 m (18 ft 8 in) track. The wheels were large, with low pressure tyres of 1,150 mm diameter and 250 mm width (45 × 10 in). Each unit had an axle, articulated at the lower longeron, and a pair of oleo legs fixed to the stub wing where the lift struts joined.

The Latécoère 350 first flew on 2 February 1931, piloted by Antoine de Saint-Exupéry. It turned out that the 350 had come out more than 30% overweight, an excess of about a tonne. Consequently, the useful load was reduced from the design estimate of 1,000 kg (2,205 lbs) to about 350 kg (772 lbs), making the 350 quite unfit for purpose. In view of that, it hardly mattered that flight tests showed that some of the performance estimates were optimistic: maximum speed was 5% less and the stalling speed higher. Since the aircraft was government funded and its property, Saint-Exupéry flew it to Villacoublay early in 1933. Its career thereafter is not recorded.

== Specifications ==
Data from Cuny 1992, p. 92

General characteristics

- Crew: 2/3
- Capacity: 10 passenger
- Length: 14.96 m (49 ft 1 in)
- Wingspan: 22.35 m (73 ft 4 in)
- Height: 3.55 m (11 ft 8 in)
- Wing area: 74.80 m^{2} (805.1 sq ft)
- Empty weight: 4,400 kg (9,700 lb)
- Gross weight: 6,500 kg (14,330 lb)
- Powerplant: 3 × Hispano-Suiza 12Jb V-12 water-cooled piston, 298 kW (400 hp) each at 2,000 rpm at sea level

Performance

- Maximum speed: 238.5 km/h (148.2 mph, 128.8 kn) at sea level
- Cruise speed: 200 km/h (120 mph, 110 kn)
- Stall speed: 114 km/h (71 mph, 62 kn)
- Service ceiling: 6,250 m (20,510 ft)

== Cited sources ==
- Cuny, Jean (1992). Latécoère Les avions et hydravions. Paris: Editions Larivière. ISBN 2-84890-067-9.
