= Latécoère 550 =

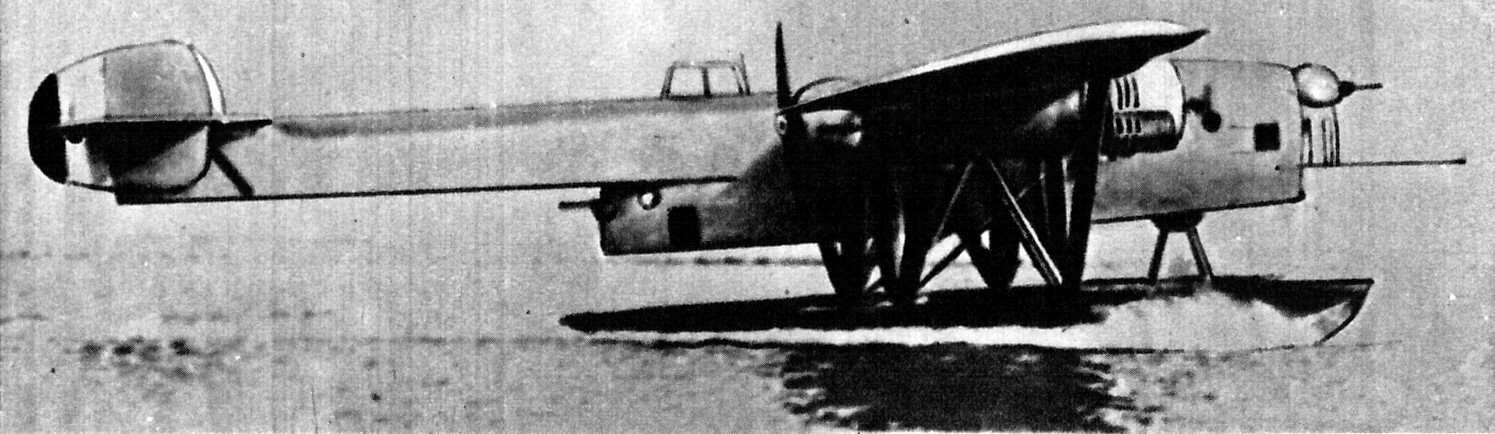

General information
- Type: Torpedo bomber
- National origin: France
- Manufacturer: La societe industrielle d'aviation Latécoère
- Number built: 1

History
- First flight: 29 April 1933

The Latécoère 550 was a four-engined French seaplane, designed in the early 1930s as a bomber/torpedo bomber. Though initial handling problems were partly resolved, the aircraft was deemed too slow and did not go into production.

== Design and development ==
In late 1932 Latécoère received an order from the Commission d'examen des Prototypes et Appareils Nouveaux de l'Aeronautique (CEPANA) for a large four-engined floatplane for bomber and torpedo bomber rôles. The resulting aircraft, the Latécoère 550 flew the following year. It was a high-wing monoplane with its four Gnôme et Rhône 9 Kdr radial engines mounted on the wings in tandem, tractor-pusher pairs. The tractor motors, neatly cowled, projected well clear of the leading edge; the pusher pair were placed in deep cut-outs in the trailing edge. The cowlings of the latter pair were removed after the first few flights to improve cooling. The wing centre section, between the engines, had an all-metal internal structure and the forward part of the skin was also metal, replaced by fabric further aft. The outer wing sections were slightly tapered on the leading edge only, with elliptical tips; they were entirely fabric-covered over a largely wooden structure, though the principal ribs were metal lattices. 6° of dihedral were added after the first tests. Double ailerons of mixed wood-and-metal construction filled almost all the trailing edges beyond the engine cut-outs.

The fuselage was flat-sided and bottomed and only slightly curved on the upper surface. The forward part, from the nose to about midway to the tail was an all-steel structure built on four longerons. Further aft, the longerons continued but were now internally braced with spruce struts and fabric-covered. The forward part was deeper, ending at the rear with an open position for a ventral gunner. At the nose, where the upper fuselage sides curved inwards to an upper gun turret and a navigator's glazed position below, the lower part ended slightly further aft in an enclosure for the bomb aimer. Pilot and co-pilot sat side by side in a glazed cockpit ahead of the leading edge. Behind them, under the same glazing, sat the engineer and the radio operator. Further aft, at the wing trailing edge, was a dorsal gunner's turret. All crew positions were joined by a corridor.

The Latécoère 550 had its tailplane mounted on top of the fuselage, strut braced from below and bearing twin inboard fins and rudders separately braced to the top of the fuselage. During flight trials, these vertical surfaces evolved in stages from a rather blunt shape, with extensions below the tailplane to a surface with a smoothly curved trailing edge entirely above the tailplane. The rudders were fitted with trim tabs. Because of the inboard rudders, the elevators had three sections.

The 550 was normally equipped with long, single stepped floats. These were mounted below the engines with four vertical spars per side and braced to the fuselage with a further pair running upwards and inwards. Each float also held the inner ends of a pair of lift struts which joined the outer section of the wing at about mid-span. Between engine, float and fuselage the bracing was complicated by further diagonal struts. The floats were replaced for a time with a pair of single wheels, contained in a streamlined structure strong enough to allow attachment of the same struts that connected to the floats. In this landplane configuration a small steerable tailwheel was added. The split undercarriage allowed the 550 to launch torpedoes and bombs from a longitudinally divided bay beneath the fuselage, with a maximum weapons weight of 1,500 kg (3,100 lbs) and torpedoes carried on the port side.

The first flight was made from Latécoère's marine base at Biscarosse on 29 April 1933 with the 550 in seaplane form. After some modifications to engine cowlings, wings and tail it went to CEPANA at Saint-Raphaël, Var for trials in October 1933 and in November was converted, in less than four hours, into a landplane. It was not well received and described as unfit for purpose: instabilities, high control loads and pitching on contact with the water were amongst the criticisms. After modifications, including the final vertical stabiliser changes, the 550 went back to CEPANA in April 1934 in seaplane form. It seems to have handled better, but by now its maximum speed was seen as low; when the sole 550 was lost in October 1934, its port float struts collapsing on alighting, there was no enthusiasm for further development.

== Specifications (seaplane) ==
Data from Cuny 1992, pp. 177

General characteristics

- Crew: 5
- Length: 19.79 m (64 ft 11 in)
- Wingspan: 33.97 m (111 ft 5 in)
- Height: 5.79 m (19 ft 0 in)
- Wing area: 129 m^{2} (1,390 sq ft)
- Empty weight: 7,264 kg (16,014 lb) up to 7,305 kg depending on equipment
- Gross weight: 10,569 kg (23,301 lb)
- Powerplant: 4 × Gnome-Rhône 9Kdr 9-cylinder radial, 370 kW (500 hp) each at 2,250 rpm

Performance

- Maximum speed: 252 km/h (157 mph, 136 kn) at 100 m
- Combat range: 1,000 km (620 mi, 540 nmi)
- Service ceiling: 6,500 m (21,300 ft) calculated
- Rate of climb: 4.10 m/s (807 ft/min) to 4000 m (13,125 ft)

Armament

- 1× 7.7 mm (0.303 in) Lewis machine gun in each of the turrets and in the open ventral position.
- Bombs and torpedoes up to 1,500 kg (3,100 lb) in total in fuselage bay, bombs in starboard side racks and torpedo port side.

== See also ==
Related lists

- List of flying boats and floatplanes
