= Latécoère 8 =

- Latécoère 8 on display at the Salon de l'Aéronautique in December 1921.

General information
- Type: Airliner
- National origin: France
- Manufacturer: Latécoère
- Primary user: Lignes Aériennes Latécoère
- Number built: 1

History
- First flight: February 1922

The Latécoère 8 was a French airliner built in 1921, but only to the extent of a single example. It was a conventional two-bay biplane with unstaggered wings and fixed tailskid undercarriage. The five-seat passenger cabin was fully enclosed and featured a celluloid panel on its ceiling as an emergency exit. The pilot sat in a separate, open cockpit to the rear of the passenger cabin. A single engine was mounted in the nose, fitted with tall pipes to carry the engine exhaust clear of the upper wing. Construction was of metal and wood, and was inspired by techniques used on the Breguet 14.

The single Latécoère 8 was exhibited at the 1921 Salon de l'Aéronautique in Paris and shortly thereafter, flew passengers and mail for Latécoère's own airline on a route between France, Spain, and Morocco. It was found to be underpowered, and when it crashed not long into its career it was not repaired.

== Specifications ==
General characteristics

- Crew: One pilot
- Capacity: 5 passengers
- Length: 8.60 m (28 ft 3 in)
- Wingspan: 12.60 m (41 ft 4 in)
- Height: 3.40 m (11 ft 2 in)
- Wing area: 46.2 m^{2} (498 sq ft)
- Empty weight: 1,500 kg (3,300 lb)
- Gross weight: 2,270 kg (5,000 lb)
- Powerplant: 1 × Renault 12Fe , 224 kW (300 hp)

Performance

- Maximum speed: 160 km/h (100 mph, 87 kn)
- Range: 500 km (310 mi, 270 nmi)
- Service ceiling: 3,500 m (11,500 ft)
