= Latécoère 13 =

General information
- Type: Airliner
- National origin: France
- Manufacturer: Latécoère
- Number built: 1

History
- First flight: 1922

The Latécoère 13 was a French airliner designed by Lignes Aériennes Latécoère in the early 1920s.

== Design ==
The Latecoere 13 was twin-engine airliner.

== Specifications ==
Data from

General characteristics

- Crew: Two
- Length: 12.75 m (41 ft 10 in)
- Wingspan: 25.40 m (83 ft 4 in)
- Height: 3.70 m (12 ft 2 in)
- Gross weight: 4,500 kg (9,921 lb)
- Powerplant: 2 × Hispano-Suiza 8Fb , 220 kW (300 hp) each

Performance

- Maximum speed: 150 km/h (93 mph, 81 kn)
