= Latécoère 24 =

French parasol winged flying boat

General information
- Type: Long range postal flying boat
- National origin: France
- Manufacturer: Latécoère (La societe industrielle d'aviation Latécoère)
- Designer: Marcel Moine
- Number built: 1

History
- First flight: late 1927

The Latécoère 24 was a French three-engined parasol winged flying boat, built in 1927 to test the longer stretches of the South Atlantic crossing. Trials showed that it was overweight and consequently performed below specification.

== Design and development ==
In 1926, Latécoère were considering ways of crossing the South Atlantic in steps. One obvious route from France's colonial possessions in West Africa and the Brazilian mainland involved a 1,400 mi ( 2,250 km) flight due south, from the Cape Verde Islands to Fernando de Noronha, as its greatest step. The aircraft they designed to do this was a three-engined parasol winged flying boat, the Latécoère 24. It was designed to carry mail, not passengers.

With its parasol wing high above the hull, the three engines which were mounted in the upper surface were well clear of spray. Two of the three 500 hp (373 kW) Farman 12 Wd W-12 water-cooled inline engines were mounted as close to the centre line as propeller clearance would allow, in tractor configuration; the third was mounted on the centre line as a pusher. This arrangement minimised the asymmetric forces resulting from the loss of any one engine. Each drove a four-bladed propeller. The wing itself was rectangular in plan, square tipped and with a low aspect ratio of about 5.8. It was a steel structure, fabric covered. The ailerons filled most of the trailing edge and carried compensators. The major structural connections between wing and hull were via the sponsons; one pair of wide streamlined struts leaned outwards from the sponson tips to mid-span on each side, and another pair went almost vertically upwards from the same point. Struts direct from wing to fuselage strengthened the centre section, supported the engines and transferred their loads.

Seen side on, the Latécoère 24's fuselage was slender and elegant, yet from below it was broad beamed to match the stubby wings. At the widest point its beam was 3.5 m and its height 1.70 m (11 ft 6 in x 5 ft 7 in). It was built of spruce and ash. The trapezoidal sponsons were largely wooden, with metal longerons. There was a mooring position in the nose with a post room aft, followed by positions for navigator and radio operator. The pilot sat in an open cockpit to starboard. Behind him were fuel tanks within firewalls, followed by mail compartments. The planing bottom had two steps, the first at the trailing edge of the sponsons and the second well aft. The tail unit had a wide chord rounded fin that carried a nearly semi-circular rudder and a tailplane at mid height to keep it clear of the water. The tailplane incidence was adjustable on the ground; the elevators had leading edge compensators like those fitted to the ailerons.

The Latécoère 24 flew for the first time from Saint-Laurent-de-la-Salanque at the end of 1927, crewed by pilot Prévot and engineer Hoff. Official trials followed and the results were not encouraging. Much of the criticism was aimed at the fuselage, chiefly its hydrodynamics and its weight. Overall, the aircraft was some 10% heavier than had been calculated in the contract, and as a result speed, range and altitude were below the expected values. There were also concerns about the reliability of the Farman engines. Consequently, Latécoère began to design a similar aircraft with a new and lighter hull and more reliable Renault engines, but this, the Latécoère 27, never got off the drawing board. Meanwhile, the Latécoère 24 was seriously damaged at its moorings when a squall lifted it onto a jetty on the Salanque. No more were built.

== Specifications ==
Data from Cuny 1992, pp. 105

General characteristics

- Crew: 3
- Length: 23.40 m (76 ft 9 in)
- Wingspan: 30.0 m (98 ft 5 in)
- Height: 4.50 m (14 ft 9 in)
- Wing area: 174 m^{2} (1,873 sq ft) without sponsons
- Empty weight: 7,670 kg (16,909 lb)
- Gross weight: 12,430 kg (27,403 lb)
- Powerplant: 3 × Farman 12 Wd W-12 (12 cylinders in three blocks of 4) watercooled , 373 kW (500 hp) each

Performance

- Maximum speed: 170 km/h (106 mph, 92 kn) at sea level
- Range: 2,500 km (1,554 mi, 1,350 nmi)
- Rate of climb: 0.55 m/s (109 ft/min) to 2,000 m (6,560 ft)
