= Latécoère 21 =

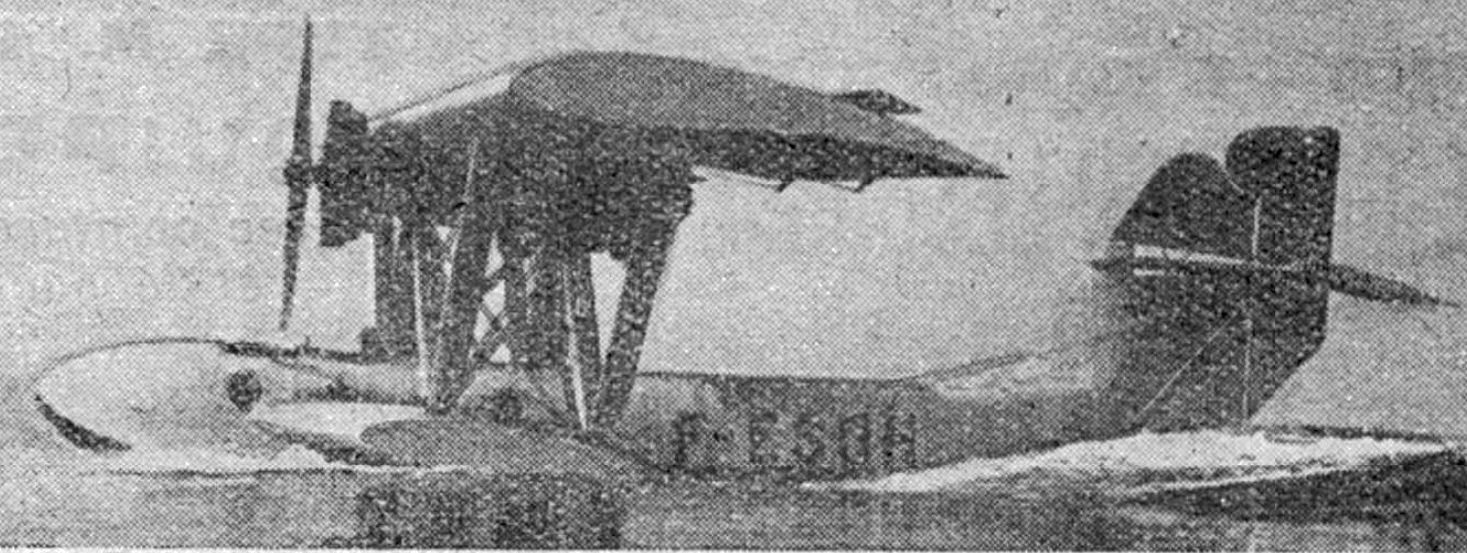

General information
- Type: Flying boat airliner
- National origin: France
- Manufacturer: Latécoère
- Primary user: Lignes Aériennes Latécoère
- Number built: 7

History
- First flight: July 1926

The Latécoère 21 was a French flying boat built in 1925 for use by Lignes Aériennes Latécoère as an airliner on routes between France and North Africa. It was the first of the Latécoère flying boats, and the first aircraft to deliver mail between Marseille and Algiers. It was a conventional design for the era, with a monoplane wing mounted parasol-fashion. Warren truss-style struts braced the wing to stub wings that acted as sponsons for stability while on the water. The twin engines were placed in tandem push-pull configuration on the wing. Up to seven passengers could be seated in an enclosed cabin, and two pilots sat side by side in separate open cockpits.

== Variants ==
- Latécoère 21 - initial version with Gnome et Rhône 9A Jupiter engines (1 built)
- Latécoère 21bis - main production version with revised hull and empennage (5 built)
- Latécoère 21ter - version with Farman 12We engines (1 built)

== Specifications (21 bis) ==
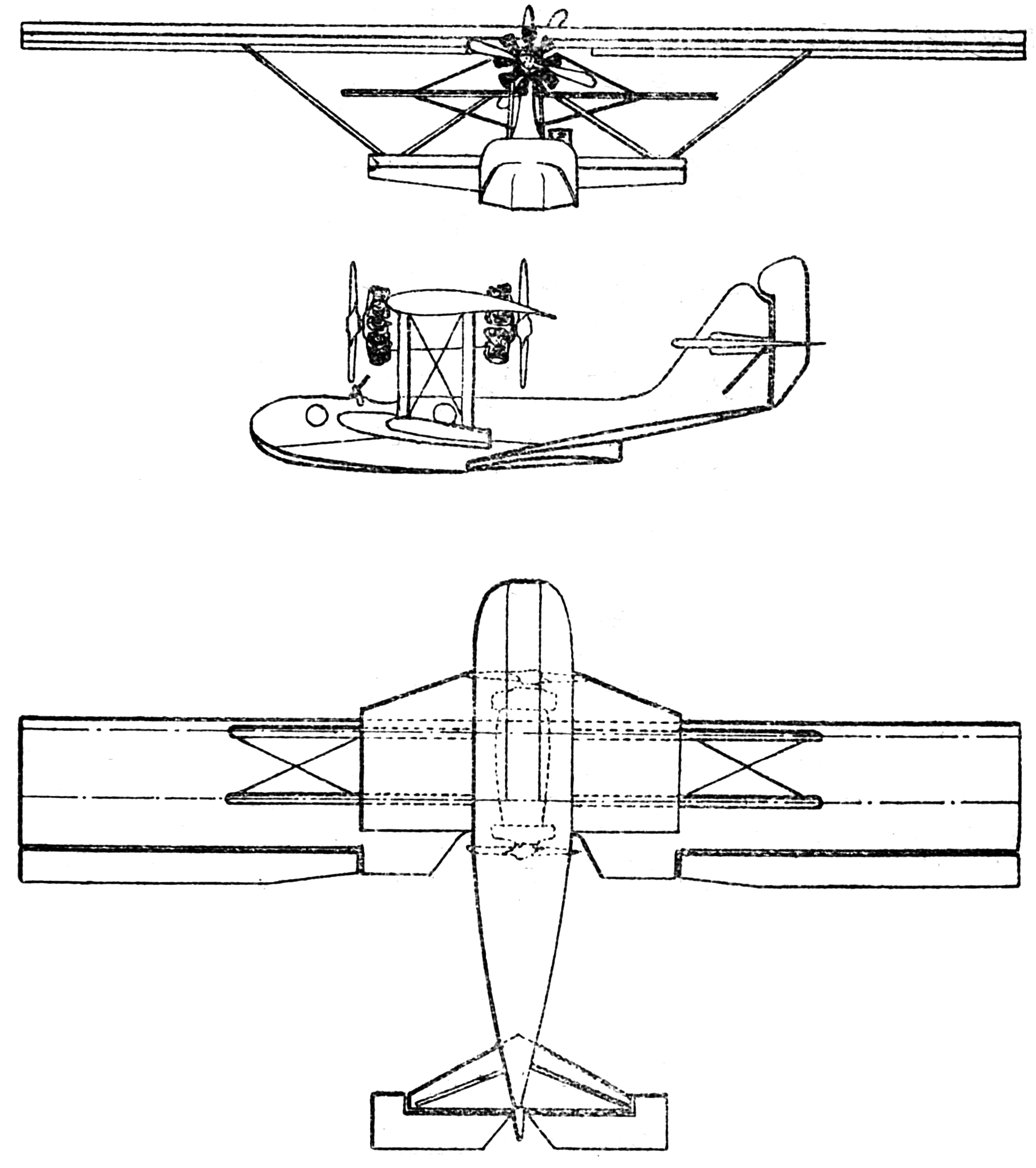
Latécoère 21 3-view drawing from Les Ailes November 11, 1926

General characteristics

- Crew: Two pilots
- Capacity: 7 passengers
- Length: 17.95 m (58 ft 11 in)
- Wingspan: 22.00 m (72 ft 2 in)
- Height: 4.85 m (15 ft 11 in)
- Wing area: 88.0 m^{2} (947 sq ft)
- Empty weight: 3,530 kg (7,780 lb)
- Gross weight: 5,730 kg (12,630 lb)
- Powerplant: 2 × Gnome et Rhône 9A Jupiter , 360 kW (480 hp) each

Performance

- Maximum speed: 172 km/h (107 mph, 93 kn)
- Range: 800 km (500 mi, 430 nmi)
- Service ceiling: 3,600 m (11,800 ft)
