= Latécoère 300 =

French mailplane

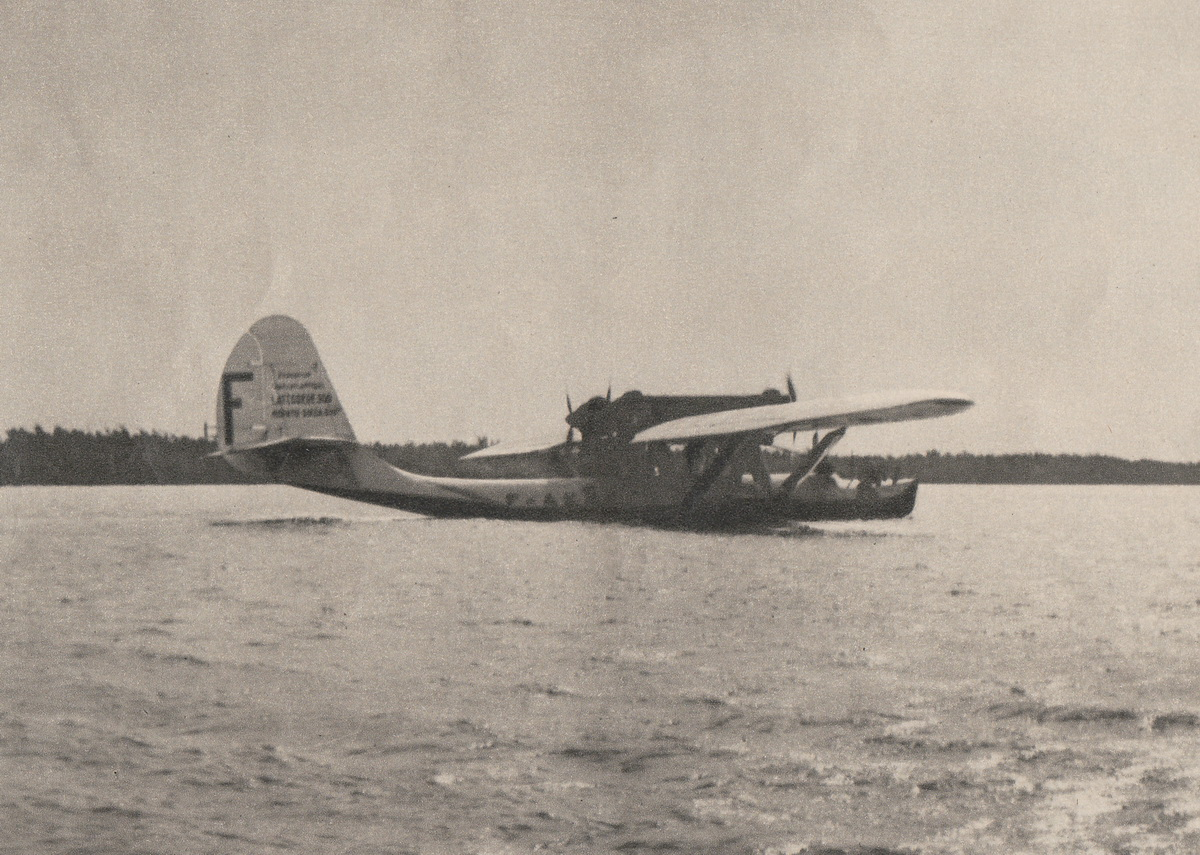
- Seaplane Latécoère 300, Natal, Brazil, 31 July 1934

General information
- Type: Civil and military flying boat
- National origin: France
- Manufacturer: Latécoère
- Primary users: Air France French Military
- Number built: 7

History
- Introduction date: 1932
- First flight: 17 December 1931

The Latécoère 300 series of aircraft were a group of civil and military flying boats. They were manufactured by French aircraft manufacturer Latécoère in the 1930s. A single Latécoère 300 was built; it was flown for the first time in 1931 and sank the same year. It was rebuilt and flown again in 1932, being named Croix du Sud ("Southern Cross").

== Description ==
The 300 was a monoplane of parasol wing construction. It was powered by four engines, each producing 650 hp, arranged in two push-pull pairs. The 300 set an international record for seaplanes on 31 December 1933, by flying 3,697 kilometers (2,297 mi) non-stop between Berre Lake near Marseille and Saint-Louis, Senegal. The aircraft then entered service with Air France, transporting mail across the Atlantic Ocean from Dakar, Senegal to Natal, Brazil. It completed 23 missions before being lost at sea on December 7, 1936. The pilot was the famous French aviator Jean Mermoz.

The civilian Laté 301, and military Laté 302 were based on the 300, with some design improvements. A total of three aircraft of each type were built between 1935 and 1936. The first of the 301s was lost, the remaining two were used in South Atlantic service until 1939. In 1939 the last remaining 301 was converted to military service, joining the 302s in patrol duties in West Africa.

Original Laté 302 aircraft had 930-hp engines, bow, beam, and engine nacelle machine gun ports, and a bomb load of 300 kilograms (660 lb). The aircraft supported a crew of four and included sleeping accommodations. Fuel and payload were stored inside the hull. The 302s and converted 301 were in service at the start of World War II, and continued in military service, flying patrols from Dakar until retired due to lack of spare parts, the last aircraft being grounded at the end of 1941.

== Variants ==
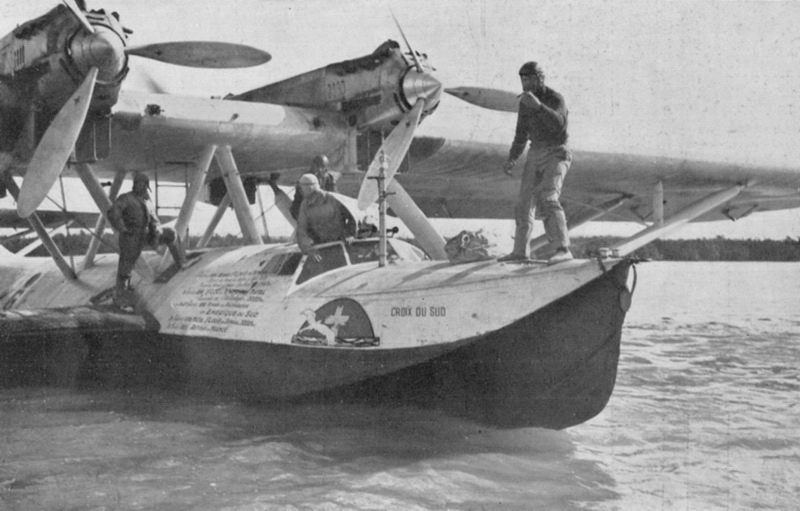
The flying-boat Croix-du-Sud, commanded by Captain Bonnot, arriving on 1 September 1934 at Natal. The sacks of mail, as soon as are they are taken from the hull, will continue their flight on aircraft of Air France.

Laté 300
Mailplane with Hispano-Suiza 12Nbr engines, one built.
Laté 301
Mailplane with Hispano-Suiza 12Nbr engines, three built.
Laté 302
Maritime reconnaissance aircraft with Hispano-Suiza 12Ydrs engines, three built.

== Operators ==
France

- Air France
- French Navy

== Specifications (Laté 302) ==
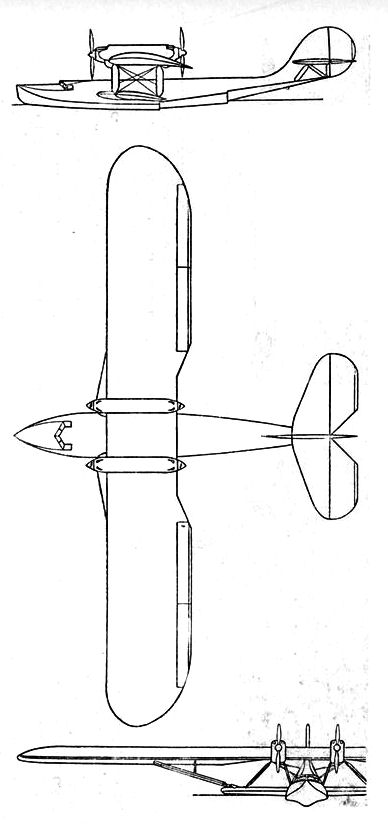
Latécoère 300 3-view drawing from L'Aerophile April 1932

Data from Warplanes of the Second World War, Volume Five, Flying Boats

General characteristics

- Crew: 8
- Length: 26.149 m (85 ft 9 1/2 in)
- Wingspan: 43.999 m (144 ft 4 1/4 in)
- Height: 7.979 m (26 ft 2 1/8 in)
- Wing area: 256.0 m^{2} (2,756 sq ft)
- Empty weight: 14,310 kg (31,548 lb)
- Gross weight: 24,000 kg (52,911 lb)
- Powerplant: 4 × Hispano-Suiza 12Ydrs2 liquid-cooled V12 engines, 690 kW (930 hp) each

Performance

- Maximum speed: 240 km/h (149 mph, 129 kn) at 2,000 m (6,560 ft)
- Cruise speed: 185 km/h (115 mph, 100 kn) at 810 m (2,650 ft)
- Range: 3,300 km (2,050 mi, 1,780 nmi)
- Endurance: 23 hr at 150 km/h (93 mph)
- Service ceiling: 5,000 m (16,400 ft)
- Time to altitude: 12.5 min to 1,000 m (3,280 ft)

Armament

- Guns: 1× 7.5 mm (0.3 in) Darne machine gun in bow, 2 firing through beam windows
- Bombs: 4 x 75 kg (165 lb) bombs

== See also ==
Aircraft of comparable role, configuration, and era

- Blackburn Sydney
- Consolidated P2Y
- Consolidated PBY Catalina
- Dornier Do 24
- Dornier Do 26
- Kawanishi H6K
- Potez-CAMS 141

Related lists

- List of aircraft of World War II
- List of Interwar military aircraft
- List of flying boats and floatplanes

== Bibliography ==
- Borget, Michel (May 1971). "Premier des Latécoère géants (1): La "Croix du Sud"". Le album de fanatique de l'Aviation (in French). No. 22. pp. 20–25.
- Borget, Michel (June 1971). "Premier des Latécoère géants (2): La "Croix du Sud"". Le album de fanatique de l'Aviation (in French). No. 23. pp. 18–21.
- Borget, Michel (July 1971). "La "Croix du Sud" et les Laté 301" [The "Southern Cross" and the Laté 301]. Le album de fanatique de l'Aviation (in French). No. 24. pp. 20–24. ISSN 0757-4169.
- Borget, Michel (September 1971). ""Croix du Sud" et les Laté 301, le drame (4)". Le album de fanatique de l'Aviation (in French). No. 25. pp. 22–26.
- Bousquet, Gérard (2013). French Flying Boats of WW II. Sandomierz, Poland: Stratus. ISBN 978-83-63678-06-7.
