= Latécoère 290 =

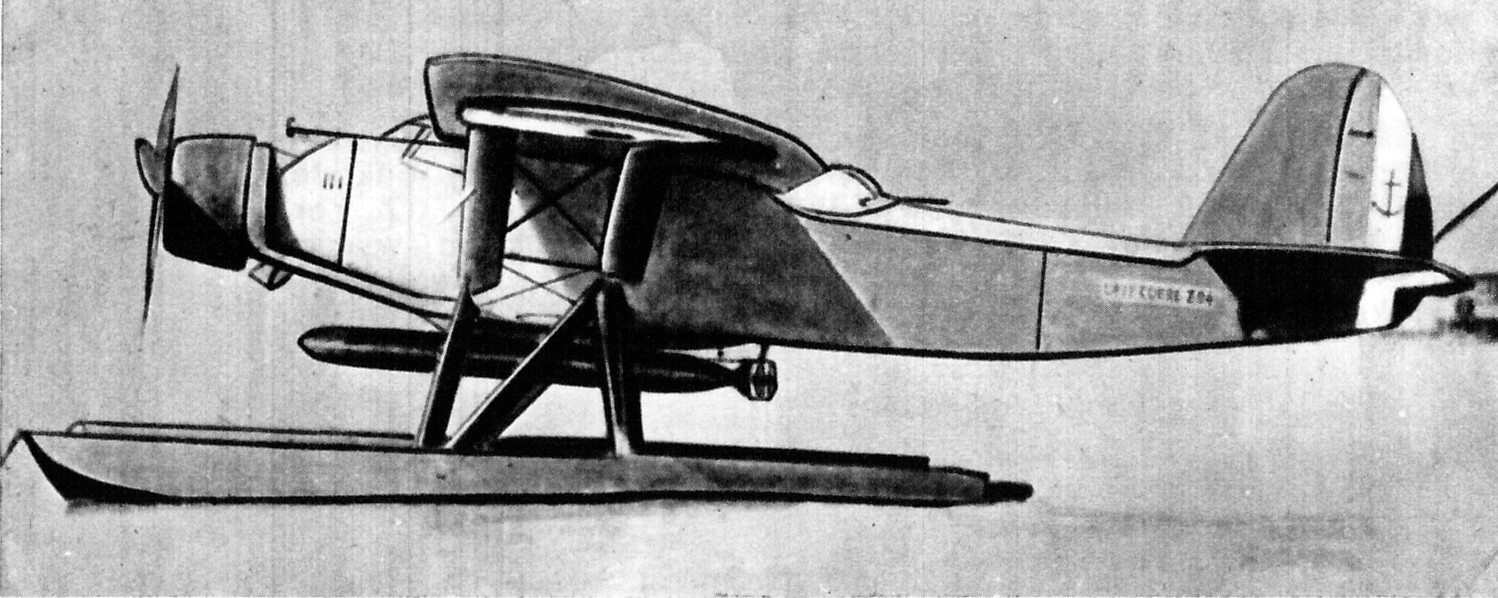
- Latécoère 294

General information
- Type: Torpedo bomber floatplane
- National origin: France
- Manufacturer: Latécoère
- Primary user: Aéronavale
- Number built: 35

History
- First flight: 3 October 1931

The Latécoère 290 was a torpedo bomber floatplane produced in France during the 1930s. Designed by Latécoère in response to an Aéronavale specification for such an aircraft, the 290 was based on its successful Laté 28.3 mail plane. It was a conventional high-wing, strut-braced monoplane that carried a single torpedo externally under the fuselage.

It was tested first with undercarriage installed and then on its intended floats; following which a batch of 20 was ordered by the navy, followed by an order for 10 more. These entered service in 1934, equipping two torpedo squadrons. All were relegated to training duties in early 1939, but four were returned to active service for coastal anti-submarine duties at the outbreak of the Second World War.

== Variants ==
- Latécoère 290 - main production version with Hispano-Suiza 12Nbr engine (2 prototypes, plus 30 production machines)
- Latécoère 293 - version with Gnome-Rhône 14Kers engine (1 built)
- Latécoère 294 - version with Gnome-Rhône 14Kdrs and revised forward fuselage and fin (1 built)
- Latécoère 296 - similar to 294 but with Hispano-Suiza 12Ydrs engine (1 built)

== Operators ==
France

- Aéronavale
  - Escadrille 1S2 (Cherbourg, 1939)
  - Escadrille 1T1 (Cherbourg, 1935)
  - Escadrille 4T1 (Berre, 1934)

== Specifications ==
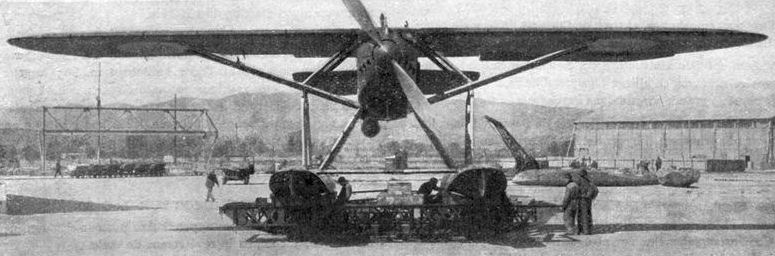
Latécoère 290 front view

General characteristics

- Crew: Three
- Length: 14.62 m (48 ft 0 in)
- Wingspan: 19.25 m (63 ft 2 in)
- Height: 6.06 m (19 ft 11 in)
- Wing area: 58.2 m^{2} (626 sq ft)
- Empty weight: 2,871 kg (6,329 lb)
- Gross weight: 4,799 kg (10,580 lb)
- Powerplant: 1 × Hispano-Suiza 12Nbr , 485 kW (650 hp)

Performance

- Maximum speed: 210 km/h (130 mph, 110 kn)
- Range: 700 km (435 mi, 378 nmi)
- Service ceiling: 4,760 m (15,615 ft)

Armament

- 1 × fixed, forward-firing .303 Vickers machine gun
- 2 × .303 Lewis guns in dorsal turret
- 1 × Type DA torpedo or 2 × 150 kg (330 lb) bombs

== See also ==
Related lists

- List of Interwar military aircraft
- List of aircraft of World War II
