= Mail plane =

Aircraft used by airmail services for conveying mail

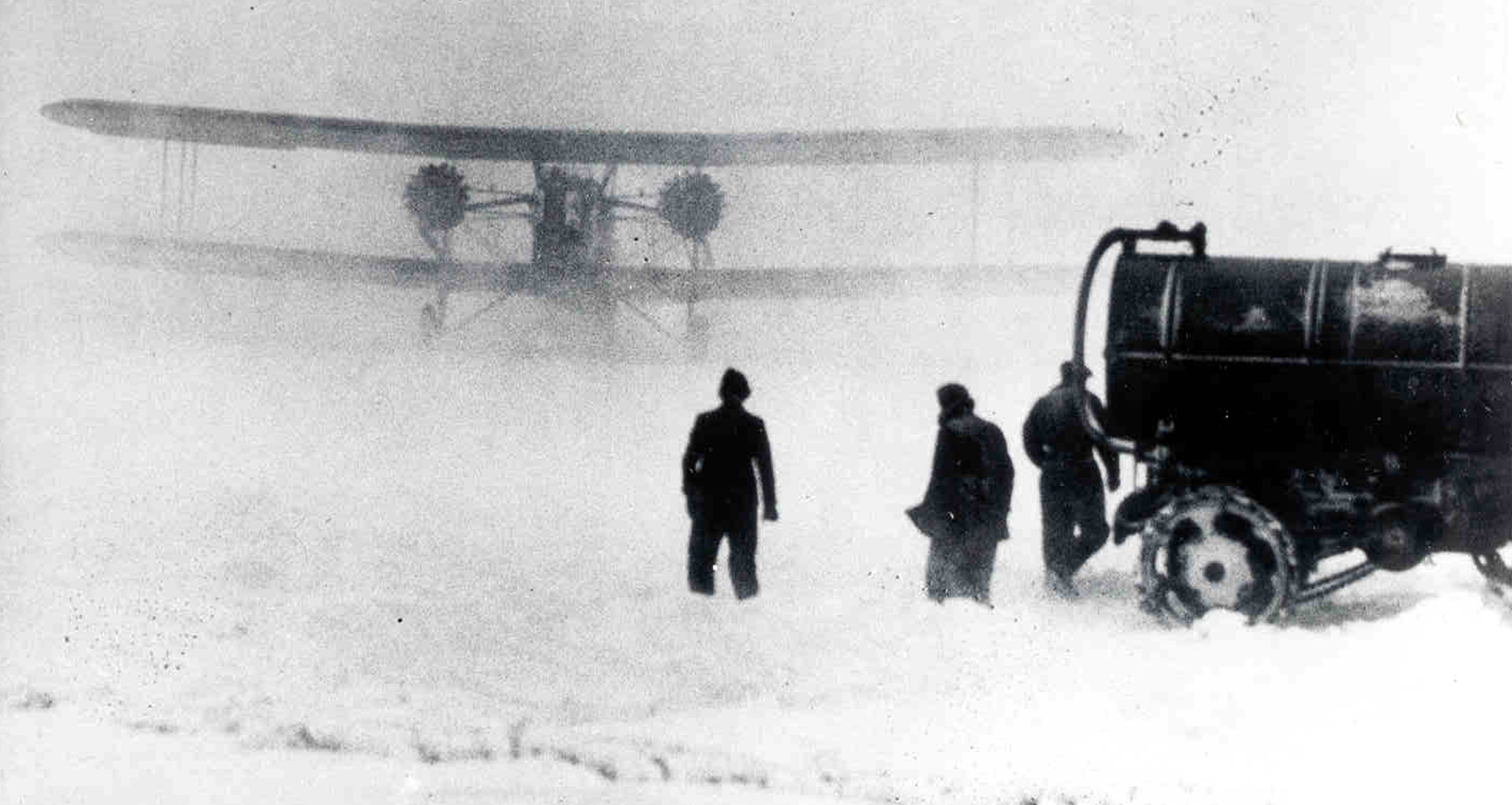
Keystone B-6 of the US Army Air Corps, in use as a mail plane, 1934

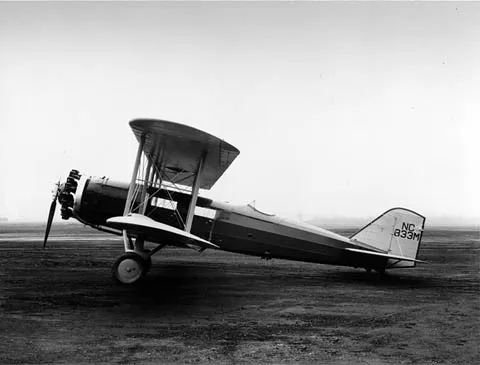
1920s Boeing Model 40 mail plane

A mail plane is an aircraft used for carrying mail.

Aircraft that were purely mail planes existed almost exclusively prior to World War II. Because early aircraft were too underpowered to carry cargoes and too costly to run any "economy class" passenger-carrying service, the main civilian role for aircraft was to carry letters faster than previously possible. In 1934, some mail services in the USA were operated by the United States Army Air Corps, soon ending in the Air Mail scandal.

In the past, mail-carrying aircraft had to carry a special official emblem on the fuselages; in case of British-registered aircraft, a special Royal Air Mail pennant (a blue triangular flag with a crowned bugle emblem in yellow and the letters "ROYAL AIR MAIL" in white) would sometimes be flown as well.

From the late 1940s, mail planes became increasingly rare, as the increasing size of aircraft and economics dictated a move towards bulk carriage of mail onboard airline flights, and this remains the primary method today. Parcel mail, overnight mail and priority mail, however, are still carried aboard what may be considered the spiritual successors of classic, pre-war mail planes; small, general aviation aircraft that have been adapted to the role, with the Cessna 208 and Piper PA-31 Navajo being among the most popular. Cargo airline operators, such as UPS and FedEx, also carry mail along with bulk cargo, aboard converted airliners.

== See also ==
- Airmail
- Volumetric weight
- Short Mayo Composite
