= Charles W. "Speed" Holman =

American aviator (1898-1931)

Charles W. Holman
- Born: Charles Willis Holman; December 27, 1898; Minneapolis, Minnesota, US
- Died: May 17, 1931 (aged 32); Omaha, Nebraska, US
- Resting place: Acacia Park Cemetery Mendota Heights, Minnesota

Charles Willis "Speed" Holman (December 27, 1898 – May 17, 1931) was an American stunt pilot, barnstormer, wing walker, parachutist, airmail pilot, record-holding aviator, and airline pilot. Born in Bloomington, Minnesota, in 1926 he became the first pilot hired by Northwest Airways and later its first operations manager. In 1928, Holman set a world record of 1,433 consecutive loops in an airplane in five hours over the St. Paul Airport.

== Biography ==
He was born in Bloomington, Minnesota, on December 27, 1898.

In 1917, Holman raced motorcycles at the Minnesota State Fair, earning the nickname "Slim", and later, "Speed". In 1918, Holman offered to work as a mechanic in exchange for flying lessons with Walter Bullock. To earn money, he quickly added parachute jumps and wingwalking to his skills. In 1924, Holman won second place in the "on to Dayton" race. In 1926, he became an airmail pilot on the CAM-9 route from Minneapolis to Chicago, along with Matty Laird. In 1927, he won the New York to Spokane cross country air derby in a Laird commercial biplane. CAM-9 was reorganized by William Bushnell Stout with several financiers to form Northwest Airlines, hiring Holman as its first pilot, later becoming its chief pilot. Holman's first pilot's license, issued in 1927, was signed by Orville Wright.

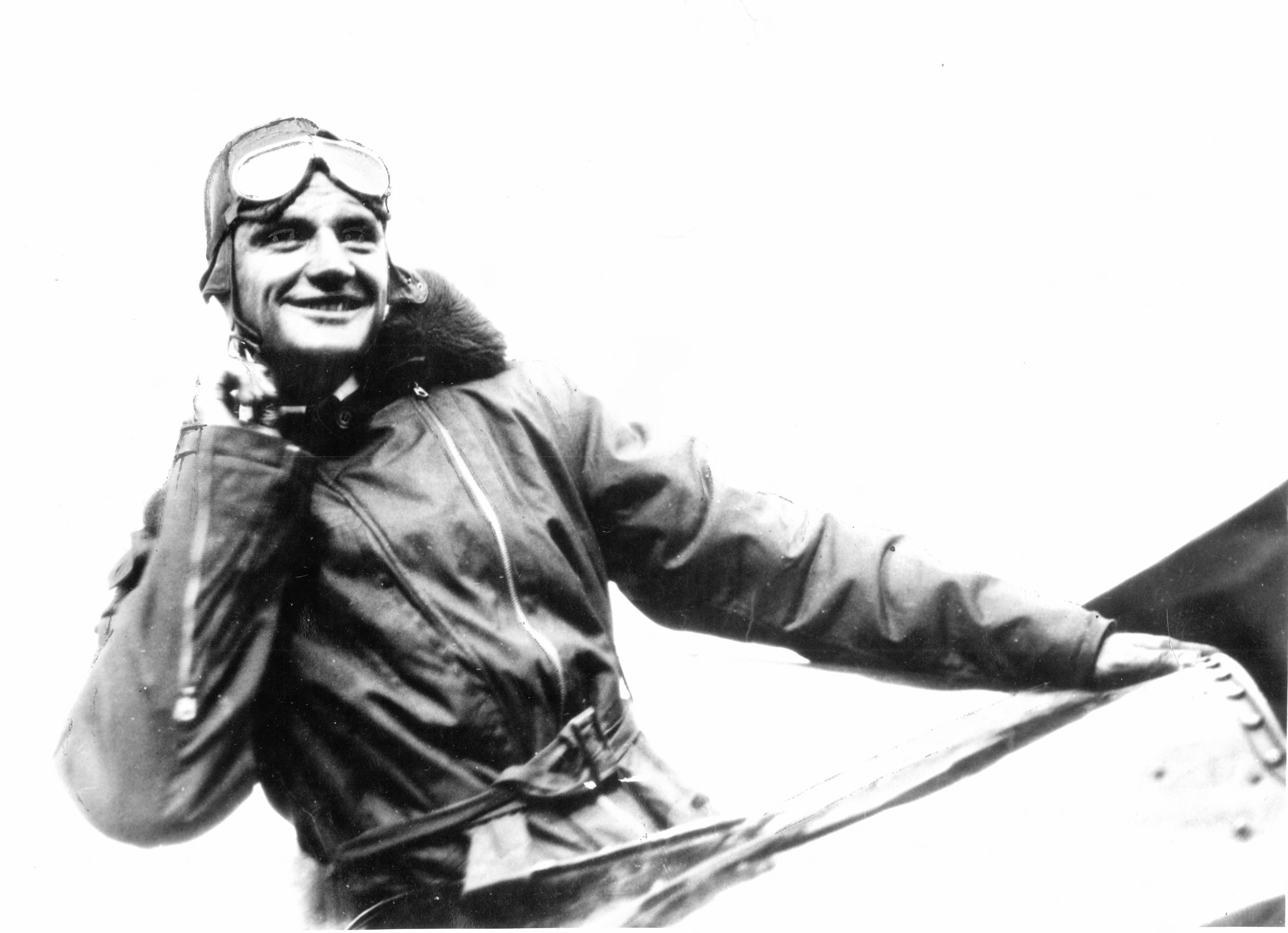
Speed Holman after setting the world record for consecutive loops in an airplane, making 1,093 consecutive loops in four hours and 27 minutes. (1928)

By 1929, Holman was a leading pilot for Northwest airlines, gaining more notoriety becoming the fourth person in the world to perform the outside loop, and first to do so in a commercial aircraft. Holman became a major investor in the airline, buying $2,000 worth of stock.

In 1930 Matty Laird was commissioned to build a racing plane based on the Laird Speedwing by B.F. Goodrich's Lee Schoenhair for the 1930 Thompson Trophy race. Schoenhair backed out of the project, believing the aircraft would not be tested in time. Laird entered the Laird Solution with Holman as the pilot only a few minutes after Holman flew the aircraft on its maiden flight. He won the race at average speed of 201.91 mph.

Holman died at age 32 when his upside-down aircraft crashed on May 17, 1931, at the opening of an airport in Omaha, Nebraska, in front of 20,000 spectators. His funeral was one of the largest yet held in St. Paul.

== Legacy ==
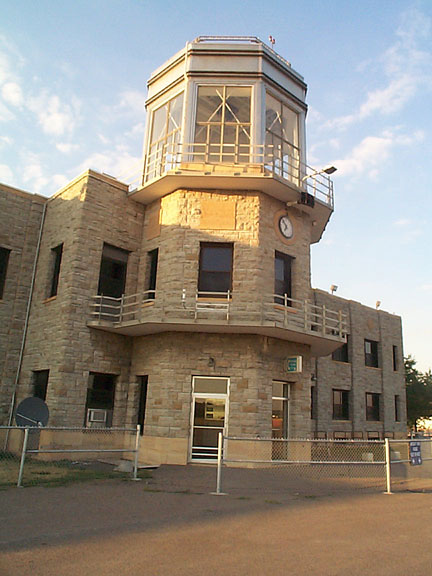
The Holman Field Administration Building is listed on the National Register of Historic Places

Holman Field, St. Paul Downtown Airport is named in honor of Speed Holman, as was Holman street in St. Paul, Minnesota. Holman's Table, located at Holman Field, is also named in honor of the famed pilot. Holman is also inducted in the Minnesota Aviation Hall of Fame.
