= E. M. Laird Airplane Company =

American aircraft manufacturer

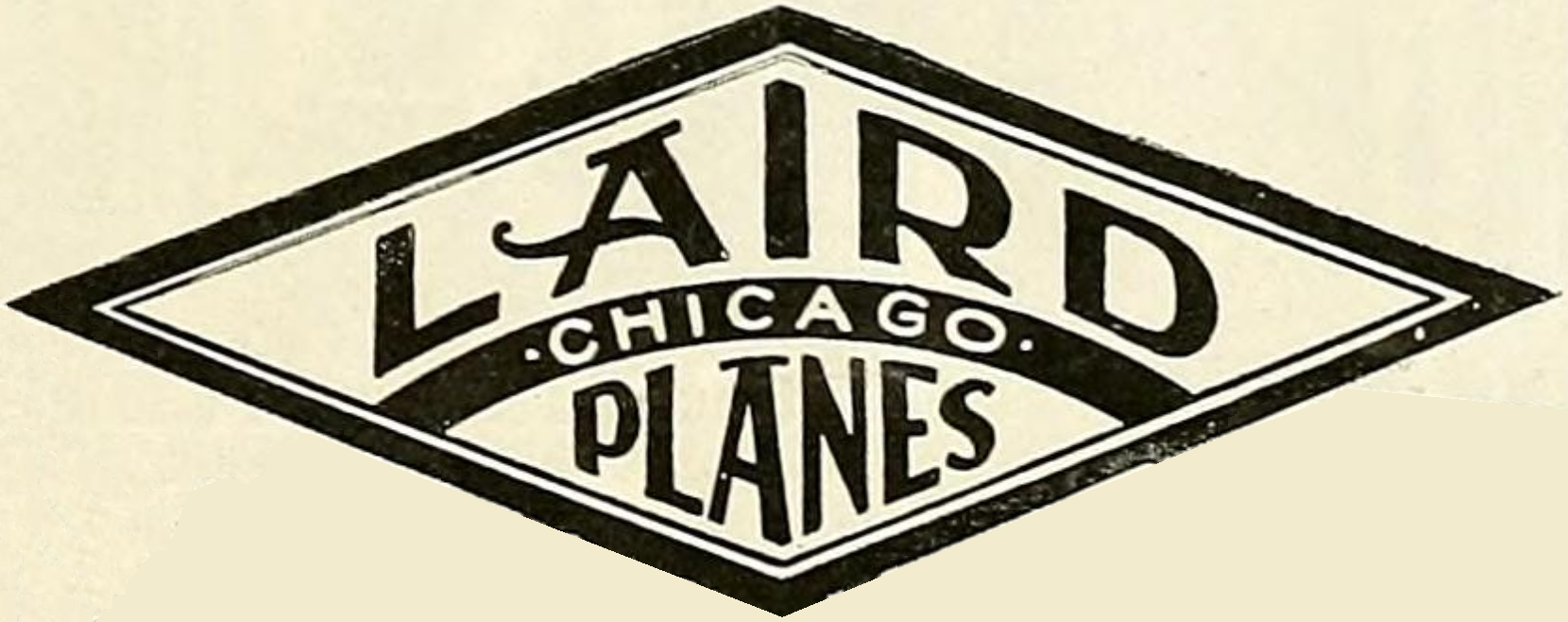
- Industry: Aerospace
- Founded: 1923
- Founder: Emil Matthew Laird
- Headquarters: Chicago, Illinois, United States

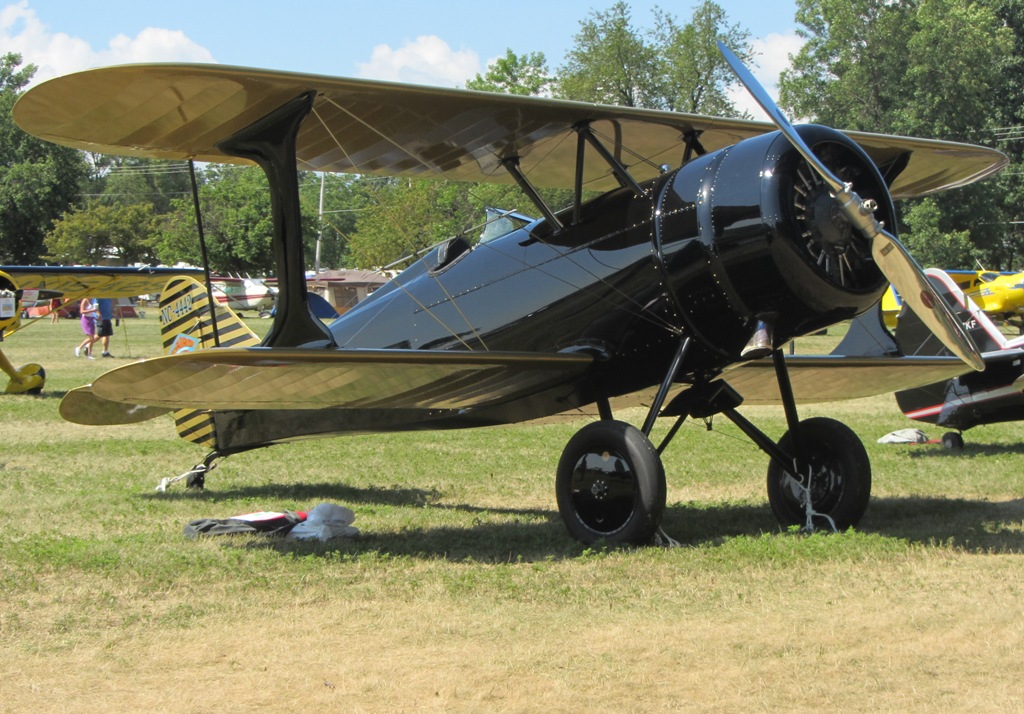
Laird LC-RW300 Speedwing

E. M. Laird Airplane Company was an American aircraft manufacturer of commercial aircraft and custom race planes.

== History ==
=== Wichita Airplane Company ===
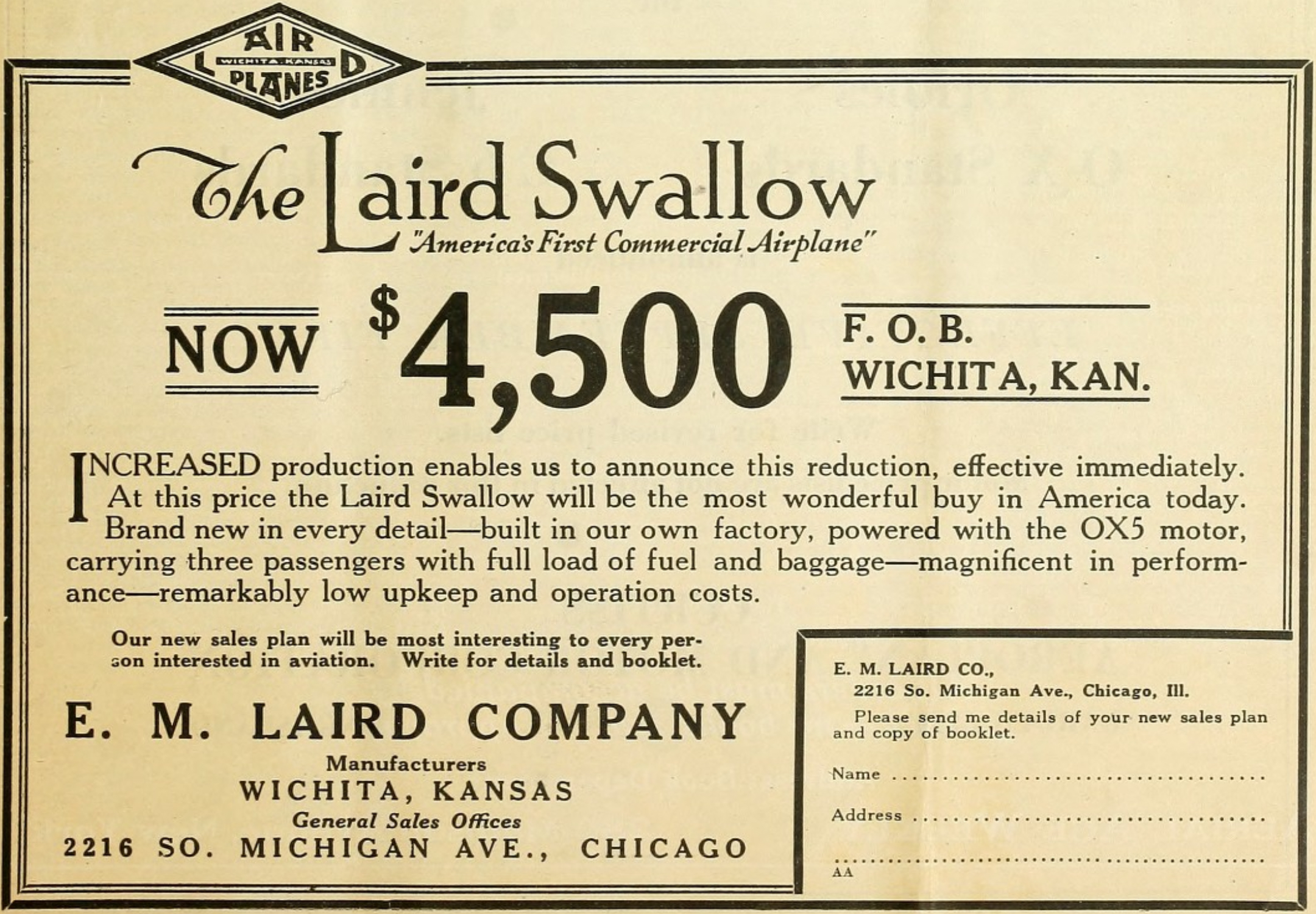
Advertisement from The Aerial Age Weekly in 1921

Emil Matthew Laird partnered with the founders of the Wichita Airplane Company to build a new commercial biplane aircraft in 1920. The E.M Laird Company built 45 Swallow aircraft of this design. The company turned down an offer to move to Monmouth, Illinois in 1922. E.M Laird sold all rights on 27 September 1923 to J. M Mollendick, and formed a new company, the E. M. Laird Airplane Company based out of Chicago. The original E. M. Laird Company then became the Swallow Airplane Company, retaining brother Charles Laird. Charles Laird concurrently started a short lived aircraft company named Laird Aircraft Corporation, publicly known as Whipporwhill in order to differentiate himself from Emil.

=== E.M. Laird Aircraft ===
The E.M. Laird Aircraft company returned to Laird's hometown, building facilities at Ashburn Field, in Ashburn, Chicago. By 1928, Laird's aircraft had reached a level quality and competition, that the Stout Metal Airplane Division of the Ford Motor Company offered to hire Laird, and purchase all the assets of his company.

== Aircraft ==
Model name	First flight	Number built	Type
Laird Swallow	1919	45	Single engine open cockpit utility biplane
Laird LC-B		11+	Single engine open cockpit utility biplane
Laird LC-R		2+	Single engine open cockpit utility biplane
Laird LC-AA		1	Single engine cabin utility biplane
Laird LC-DC		2 or 3	Single engine open cockpit racing monoplane
Laird LC-DE Speedwing Junior	1930	1	Single engine open cockpit racing monoplane
Laird LC-DW Solution	1930	1	Single engine open cockpit racing biplane
Laird LC-DW500 Super Solution	1931	1	Single engine open cockpit racing biplane
Laird LC-RW	1931	2	Single engine open cockpit racing biplane
Laird LC-EW		1	Single engine cabin utility monoplane
Laird LC-1B	1930	11+	Single engine open cockpit utility biplane
Laird-Turner Meteor LTR-14 (modifications)	1936	1	Single engine cabin racing monoplane
