= Laird Baby Biplane =

Second aircraft built by E.M. Laird (1912)

Baby Biplane
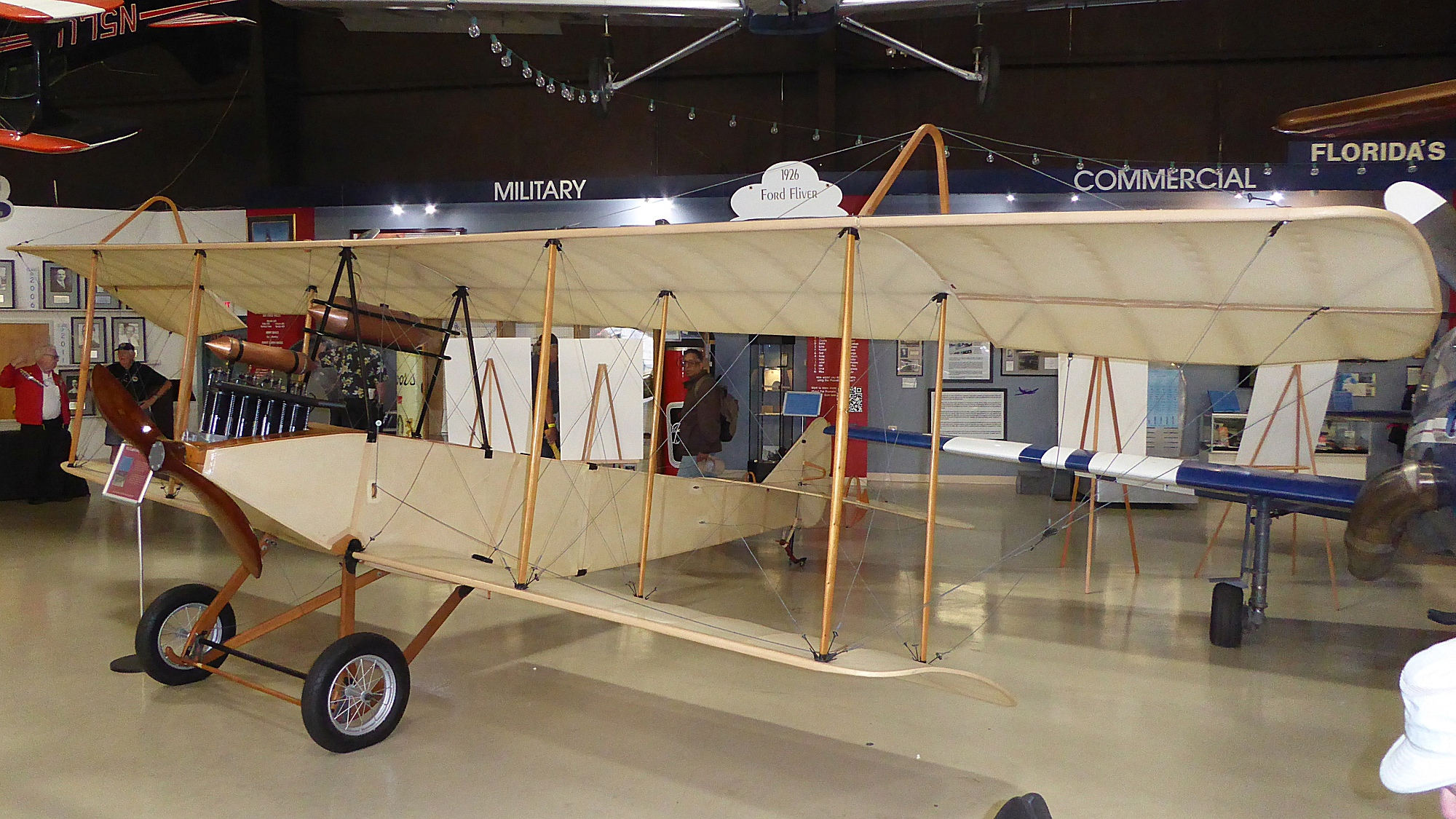
- Replica at the Florida Air Museum

General information
- Type: Homebuilt aircraft
- National origin: United States
- Designer: Emil Matthew Laird
- Number built: 1

History
- Introduction date: 1912

The Laird Baby Biplane was the second aircraft built by Matty Laird in the United States of America.

== Design and development ==
The Baby Biplane was built by Laird at the age of 16, with assistance from his brother Charles.

The Baby Biplane was a single-seat biplane made of wood with aircraft fabric covering, having conventional landing gear. Later the aircraft was covered with Irish Linen and French cellulose-nitrate dope.

== Operational history ==
Laird operated from Chicago's Cicero field. A self-taught pilot, his first flight resulted in the aircraft flipping over after becoming airborne. Over time, the aircraft flew up to 30 minutes at a time. The instrument panel consisted of a pocket watch, used to time the fuel supply.

== Aircraft on display ==
A replica of the Baby Biplane was built by Dean Tilton and donated to the Florida Air Museum in Lakeland, Florida, United States.

== Specifications (Baby Biplane) ==
Data from

General characteristics

- Crew: one
- Powerplant: 1 × Hoefer (Franklin & Indian) , 12 hp (8.9 kW)
