= Laird B-4 =

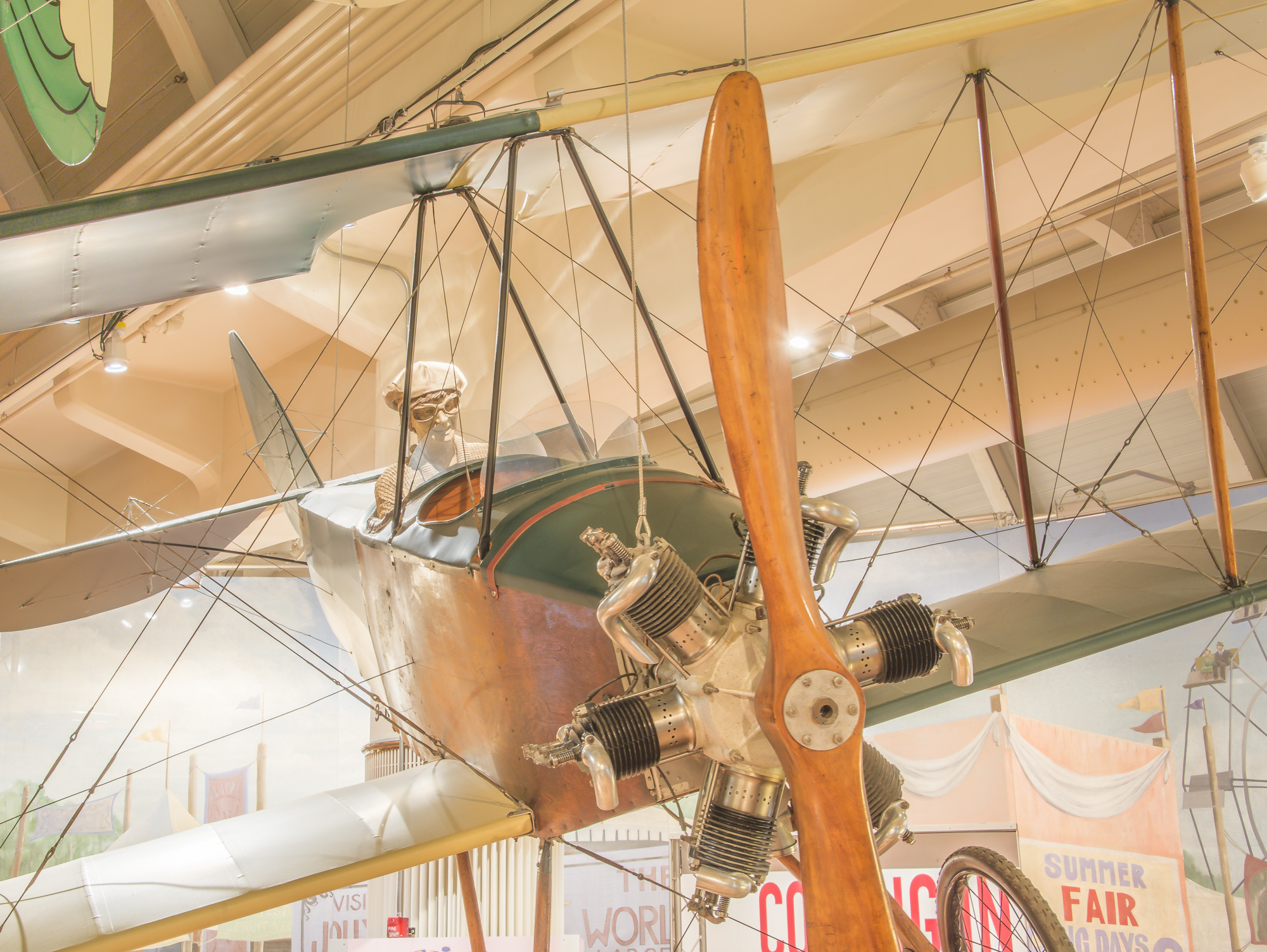
- The Laird B-4 of 1915, at the Henry Ford Museum

General information
- Type: Homebuilt aircraft
- National origin: United States
- Designer: Emil Matthew Laird
- Number built: 1

History
- Introduction date: 1915

The Laird B-4, a.k.a. Laird 1915 biplane, was the fourth aircraft built by Matty Laird in the United States of America. It was an excellent aerobatic aircraft and was used very effectively in performances by Laird, as well as by Katherine Stinson during her tour of Japan and China.

== Design and development ==
During the period when Matty Laird was performing as a barnstorming pilot, he designed this as an aerobatic aircraft for his own use. He built the aircraft with assistance from his brother Charles and friend George E. “Buck” Weaver. The aircraft was constructed from wood, fabric, and wire bracing. It was powered by a 45 hp (34 kW) six-cylinder Anzani radial engine. Laird was approximately 20 years old when he built the aircraft.

Laird referred to the aircraft as “My Anzani-powered machine” as well as “Boneshaker” because the powerful engine generated such strong vibrations in the airplane.

== Operational history ==
The aircraft's power and structural strength made it excellent for aerobatics, and Laird's flying skill enabled him to take advantage of the aircraft's characteristics and to perform several challenging maneuvers. For instance, he performed the loop-the-loop, which only a few American pilots could perform prior to World War I. Laird's performances in the aircraft generated significant public awareness of him and the aircraft.

Laird loaned the aircraft to Katherine Stinson for her 1916-1917 flying exhibition tour to Japan and China. This tour created tremendous attention for Stinson and for Laird's aircraft within and beyond the two countries.

== Aircraft on display ==
Laird donated the aircraft to the Henry Ford Museum and it is on display there.

== Specifications (1915 Laird Biplane) ==
Data from Heroes of the Sky at Henry Ford Museum, The Planes: 1915 Laird Biplane

General characteristics

- Crew: 1
- Capacity: 1 pax
- Length: 19 ft 5 in (5.92 m)
- Wingspan: 25 ft 4 in (7.72 m)
- Empty weight: 600 lb (272 kg)
- Powerplant: 1 × Anzani 6-cylinder air-cooled radial piston engine, 45 hp (34 kW)
- Propellers: 2-bladed fixed-pitch propeller

Performance
