= Sun 'n Fun =

Annual airshow and aviation expo in Lakeland, Florida, United States

Sun 'n Fun Aerospace Expo
- Formation: 1974
- Type: Nonprofit organization
- Tax ID no.: 59-2803958
- Legal status: 501(c)(3) public charity
- Purpose: Aviation education
- Location: Lakeland, Florida
- Coordinates: 27.9819°N 82.0272°W
- Services: Fly-ins & other aviation events
- Fields: Aviation
- President & CEO: Gene Conrad
- Parent organization: Aerospace Center for Excellence
- Website: www.sun-n-fun.org

former Sun 'n Fun logo

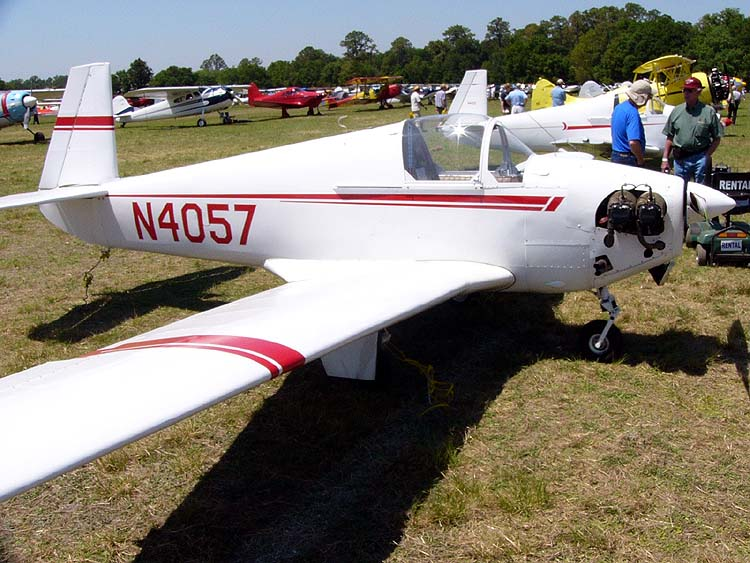
A Mooney M-18 Mite on display at Sun 'n Fun

Sun 'n Fun Aerospace Expo (officially styled SUN 'n FUN) is a nonprofit organization in Lakeland, Florida dedicated to the promotion of aviation education. It is best known for the annual week-long fly-in and airshow at Lakeland Linder International Airport in Lakeland, Florida, usually held during late March or early April.

Previously called the 'Sun 'n Fun International Fly-In and Expo, for 2020 the event was officially renamed the Sun 'n Fun Aerospace Expo in April 2019.

In addition to the fly-in, at one time Sun 'n Fun also operated the Florida Air Museum and supported the Central Florida Aerospace Academy—an aviation-focused career academy operated by the Polk County School Board as part of Kathleen High School and Winter Haven High School. In October 2019 a reorganization made the fly-in part of the Aerospace Center for Excellence, a non-profit organization that was established in 2014 to provide young students with science, technology, engineering and mathematics (STEM) instruction.

== History ==
Jessica Roberts of Polk County Government Television (PGTV) guides a brief tour showcasing some events of the Sun 'n Fun 2018 expo.

The event was founded in 1974.

== Other ventures ==
External videos
- Sun 'n Fun - Aerospace Center for Excellence, YouTube video; Polk Government Television. retrieved 20 July 2018

The Florida Air Museum at Sun 'n Fun is also located on the Sun 'n Fun campus at Lakeland Linder International Airport.

In April 2010, Sun 'n Fun received a US$7.5M grant from the Aviation Education Foundation for the new Central Florida Aerospace Academy building. The school is an existing aviation-oriented high school and career academy that is already located on the airport grounds. Completed in August 2011, it accommodates 500 high school students, increasing its previous capacity of 175 students.

By 2022, Sun 'n Fun expanded the Central Florida Aerospace Academy by opening a new temporary campus located upon the grounds of Winter Haven's Gilbert Airport, integrating the program into Winter Haven High School as a similar career academy, though operating out of temporary facilities while plans are produced for a permanent campus.

== Scholarships ==
The Florida Air Museum and Sun 'n Fun are responsible for fundraising and operation of the Ray Foundation, Inc., a non-profit foundation named after James C. Ray, partnered with the Aerospace Center for Excellence, which offers numerous scholarships to students in Polk County and the general public to promote aviation education and foster interest in aviation careers.

The Ray Foundation is responsible for overseeing the James C. Ray Flight Training Scholarship, the James C. Ray Continuing Education Scholarship, and several others, all of which are administered by the Aerospace Center for Excellence staff within Sun 'n Fun.

== Notable events ==
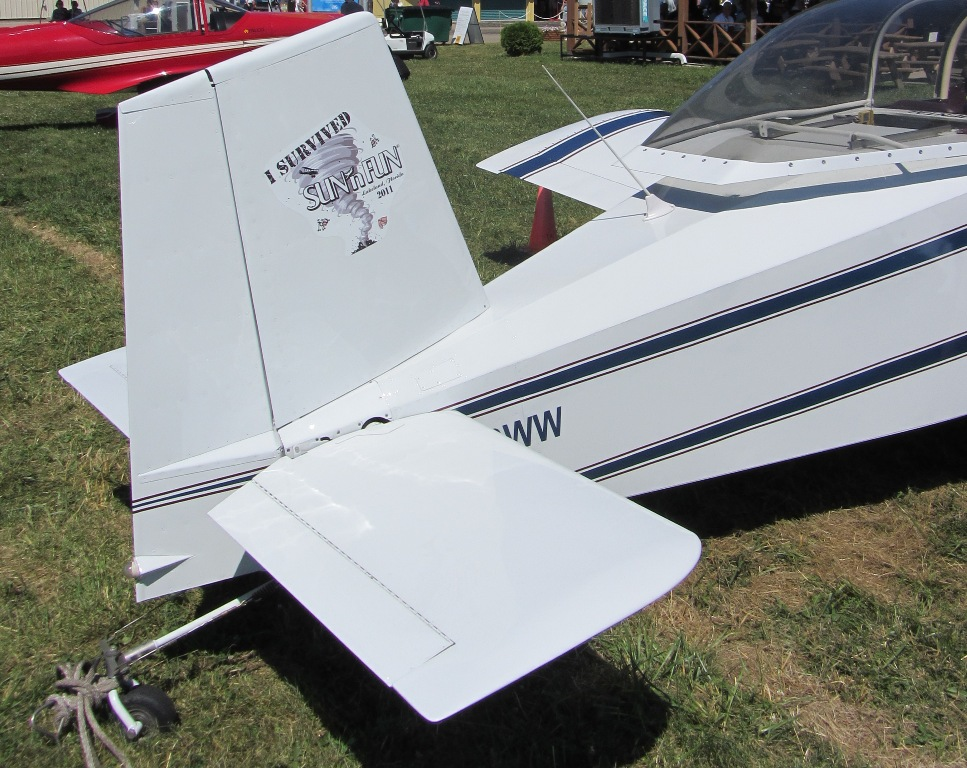
A Thorp T-18 tornado survivor

The first weekend fly-in, called Mid-Winter Sun 'n Fun, was held in January 1975 at the Lakeland Municipal Airport and was limited to pilots and Experimental Aircraft Association (EAA), SESAC and FSAACA members. A total of 1,980 guests and 365 aircraft were present. The following year, the fly-in was expanded to a full week, and the City of Lakeland approved a lease for the convention site to be moved to the southwest quadrant of the airport. The public was invited on a limited basis. The number of visiting aircraft more than tripled compared to the first year, with 1,200 aircraft including 200 homebuilts; 180 antiques; 260 classics; and 28 warbirds on site. Snow fell at the airport for the only time in show history to date during the 1977 show.

In 1992, The Sun 'n Fun Air Museum (now the Florida Air Museum) held its grand opening. In 1997, the Brazilian Air Force's Aerial Demonstration Squadron (known as the Smoke Squadron) was the featured act. In 2000, Airshow legend Bob Hoover performed the last flight of his Shrike Commander at the fly-in. Two years later, Bobby Younkin debuted the world's first aerobatic Learjet. During the 2004 show, Bruce Bohannon and his turbocharged Exxon Flyin' Tiger set four time to climb world records.

On March 31, 2011, an EF1 tornado hit the grounds of the airshow, resulting in damage to 40-50 aircraft, along with display tents and exhibits. Fifteen people received minor injuries. The airshow continued the next day.

The 2015 show featured the first US performance of the Breitling Jet Team. In 2017, the show featured the French Air Force Patrouille de France aerobatic team, making it the second appearance in the US (the first being at the Melbourne Air And Space Show on April 1–3) in more than 30 years. The team flew one show on April 4.

== See also ==
- EAA AirVenture Oshkosh
- Air & Sea Show – annual South Florida airshow
