= Laird-Turner Meteor LTR-14 =

Type of aircraft

Meteor LTR-14
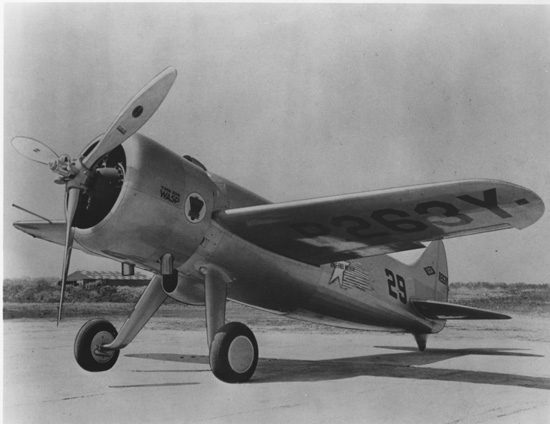

General information
- Type: Racing aircraft
- National origin: America
- Manufacturer: Lawrence Brown Aircraft Company
- Designer: Roscoe Turner, Professor Howard Barlow
- Number built: 1

History
- Introduction date: 1936

The Laird-Turner RT-14 Meteor, also called the Turner TR-14, Ring Free Meteor, PESCO Special, Miss Champion, Turner Special and the Turner Meteor is the winning aircraft of the 1938 and 1939 Thompson Trophy races.

== Design and development ==
The aircraft was commissioned and designed by Roscoe Turner in 1936. The Meteor would be the last of the Matty Laird race planes as well as the last race plane flown by Roscoe Turner.

The aircraft is a conventional geared mid-wing monoplane with a radial engine built in California. It was modified in 1936 by Mattie Laird at the E. M. Laird Airplane Company in Chicago with three-foot longer wings, wing flaps, a longer fuselage and a 50 U.S. gallons (190 L; 42 imp gal) fuel tank. In 1938 wheel pants were added for the Oakland races.

== Operational history ==
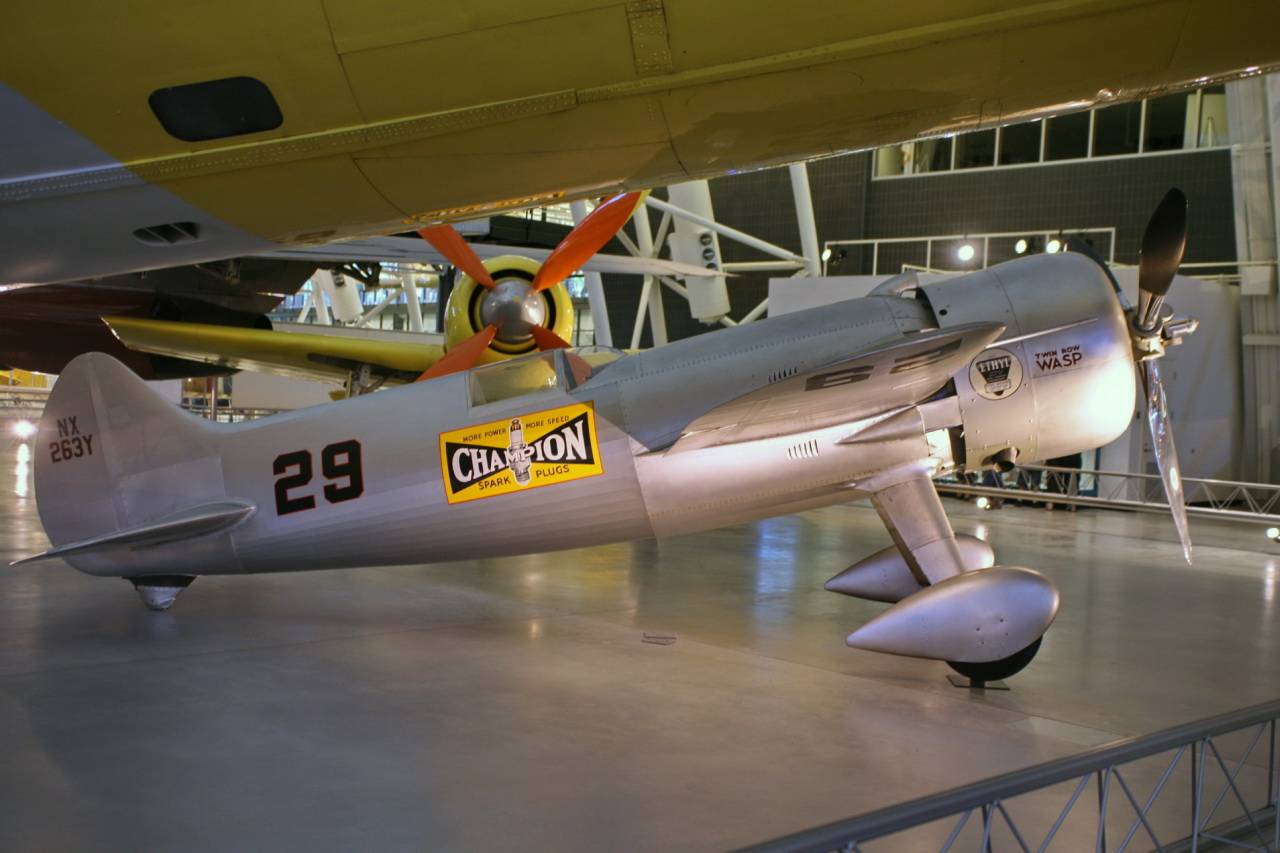
On display at the National Air and Space Museum

The aircraft was known by many names. Initially the RT-14 for "Roscoe-Turner 14 cylinder". The Air Commerce Bureau labeled it the Model No. LTR-14, Serial No. 11, Type 1 POLM. The first sponsor was the Ring-Free Oil company, naming the aircraft the Ring-Free Meteor. The 1938 sponsor, Pump Engineering Service Corp., renamed the aircraft "The PESCO SPECIAL". In 1939, the Champion Spark Plug Co borrowed the name from its 1931 Pitcairn PCA-2 autogyro, giving the aircraft the name "Miss Champion".

- 1937 National Air Races - Turner placed third after missing a pylon in the sun at 253.802 mph (408 km/h). A fire from a leaking fuel tank prevented Turner from racing in the Bendix Trophy race and required the fabric to be recovered before competing.
- 1938 National Air Races - Turner won the Thompson Trophy Race at 283.416 mph (456 km/h)
- 1938 Oakland Air Race - Second place

The original aircraft was put into storage at Weir Cook Airport for 29 years until it was restored, then donated to the Crawford Auto-Aviation Museum. In December 1972 the plane, along with many of Roscoe Turner's trophies, was transferred to the Smithsonian. The aircraft retired with less than 30 hours flying time.The Meteor is on display at the National Air and Space Museum, Washington, D.C.

The Cook Islands minted a $2 Coin in 2008 featuring the Laird-Turner Meteor LTR-14 as part of its 1930s Air Racing Collection

== Variants ==
- In 2003, Tom Wathen built a replica of the LTR-14, demonstrating it at the 2003 EAA Airventure airshow.

== Specifications (Laird-Turner RT-14 Meteor) ==
Data from Smithsonian

General characteristics

- Capacity: one
- Airfoil: symmetrical
- Fuel capacity: 50 U.S. gallons (190 L; 42 imp gal)
- Powerplant: 1 × Pratt & Whitney Twin Wasp , 1,000 hp (750 kW)
- Propellers: 3-bladed

Performance

- Maximum speed: 300 kn (350 mph, 560 km/h)

== See also ==
Related lists

- List of racing aircraft
