= Laird Solution =

LC-DW Solution
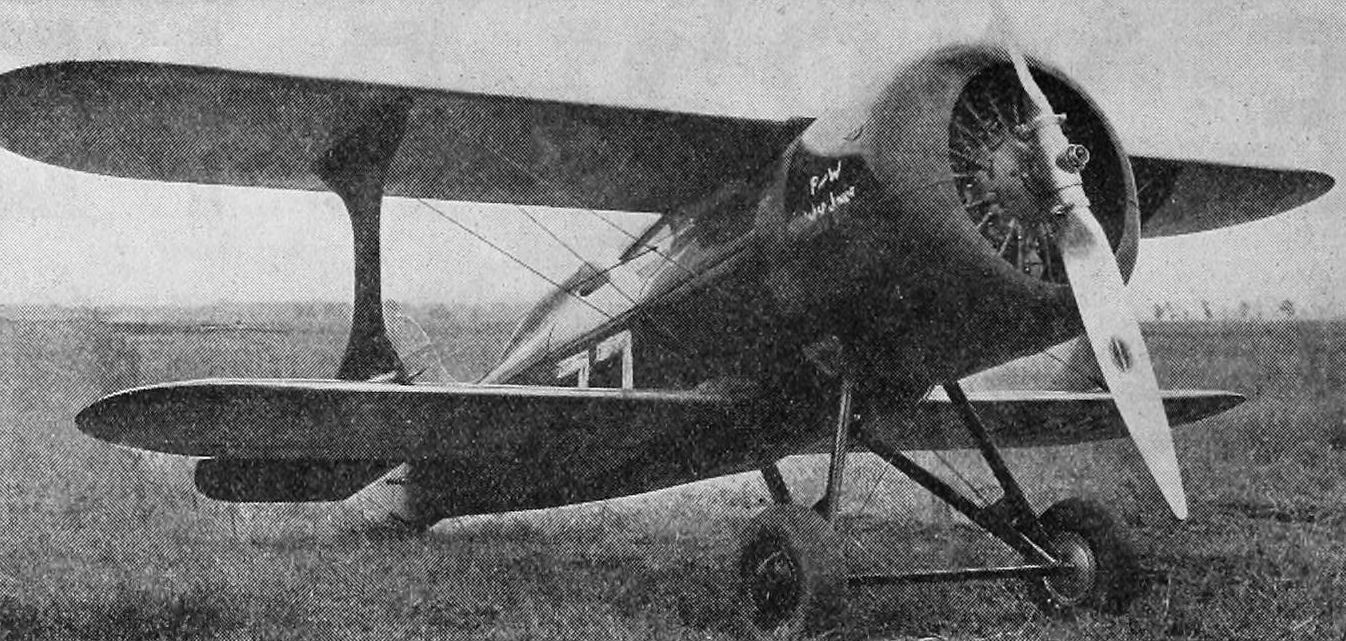

General information
- Type: Racing aircraft
- National origin: United States of America
- Manufacturer: E. M. Laird Airplane Company
- Designer: E. M. Laird
- Number built: 1

History
- Introduction date: 1930
- Variant: Laird Super Solution

The Laird Solution, also called the Laird LC-DW Solution, Laird LC-DW300 Super Solution and Laird LC-DW500 Super Solution, was touted as being the "solution" to the problem of the Travel Air Mystery Ship. The Solution won the 1930 Thompson Trophy race days.

== Design and development ==
In 1930 Matty Laird was commissioned to build a racing plane based on the Laird Speedwing by B.F. Goodrich's Lee Schoenhair for the 1930 Thompson Trophy race. Schoenhair backed out of the project, believing the aircraft would not be tested in time. Laird entered the Solution himself in the 1930 Thompson Trophy with Charles "Speed" Holman as the pilot.

The Solution, (registered NR10538), was a biplane with conventional landing gear, having a welded steel fuselage and aircraft fabric covering. The aircraft kept the same registration number NR10538, and was repainted several times from black and gold, white and gold, to lavender and gold.

A second aircraft, (NR12048), powered by a 535 hp Pratt & Whitney Wasp was built as the Laird LC-DW300 Super Solution, retaining the fixed undercarriage of the original, for the 1931 Bendix Trophy which it won, piloted by Jimmy Doolittle. This aircraft was modified with retractable landing gear for the 1932 Bendix Trophy but on a test flight the gear failed to lower and Doolittle was forced to belly land the aircraft, forcing withdrawal from the race.

== Operational history ==
- 1930 Thompson Trophy (Solution NR10538) - Chicago, Illinois 1 September 1930. Placed first.201.91 kn (374 km/h) for 20 laps The pilot Speed Holman flew with exhaust gases leaking into the cockpit causing him to pass out several times during the event.
- 1931 Thompson Trophy (Solution NR10538) - Sponsored by the Sweet Kiss Tooth Paste Company.

The Laird Solution was restored over a period of seven years and is on display in its Black and Gold paint scheme at the New England Air Museum.

== Variants ==
Laird LC-DW Solution
Powered by a 300hp Pratt & Whitney R-985, (NR10538), competed in the 1930 and 1931 Thompson trophy races piloted by "Speed" Holman achieving an average speed of 202mph.
Laird LC-DW300 Super Solution
A second aircraft, (NR12048), built for Jimmy Doolittle to race in the 1931 Bendix Trophy, powered by a 535hp supercharged Pratt & Whitney R-985 Wasp Jr.
Laird LC-DW500 Super Solution
NR12048 modified with retractable undercarriage. Entered in the 1932 Bendix Trophy, but withdrawn after a belly landing due to the landing gear failing to extend forced withdrawal.

== Specifications (LC-DW Solution) ==
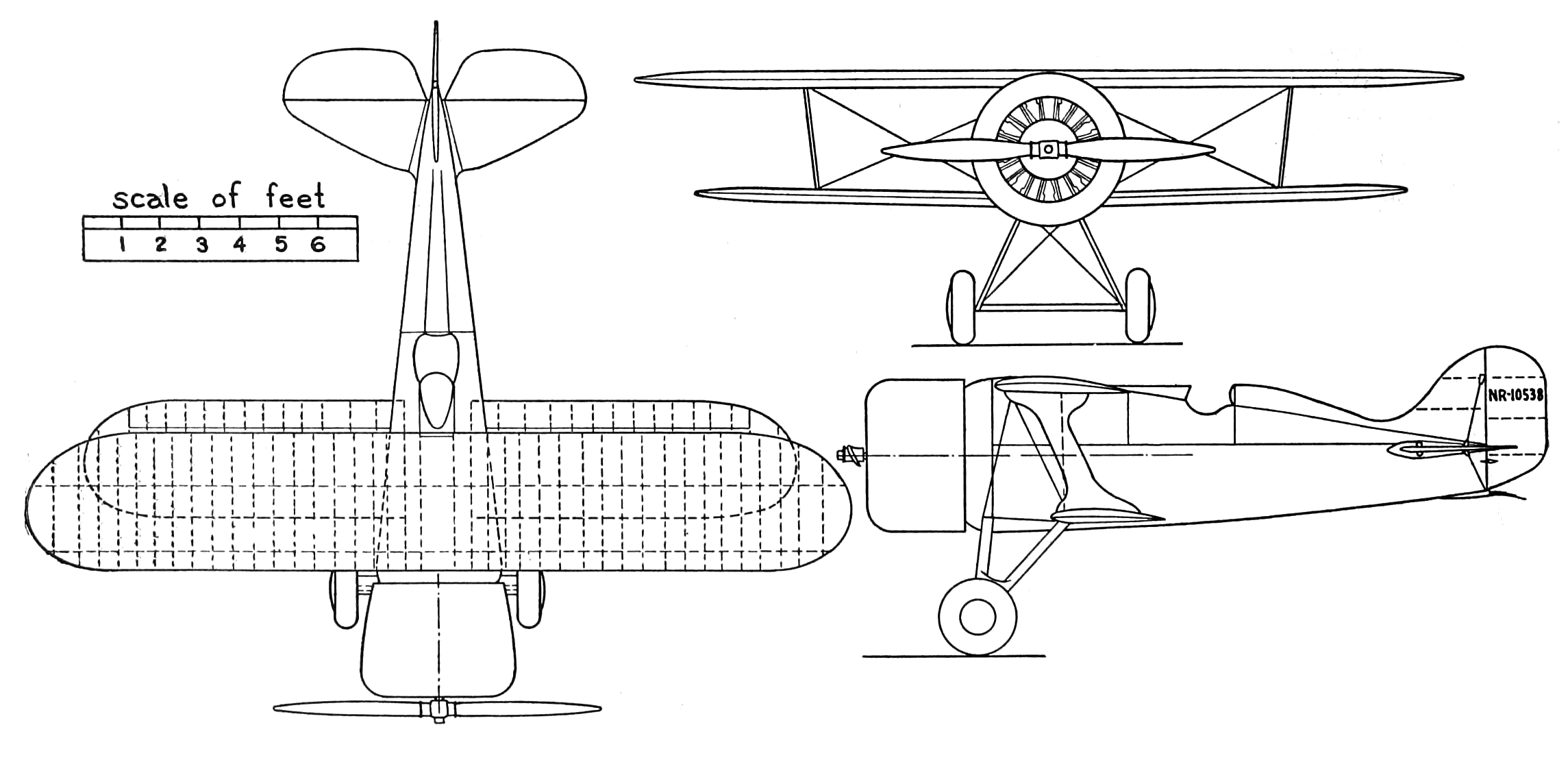
Laird LC-DW 300 Solution 3-view drawing from Aero Digest October,1930

Data from Skyways, Race to the Wind

General characteristics

- Crew: one
- Length: 17 ft 9 in (5.41 m)
- Wingspan: 21 ft (6.4 m)
- Empty weight: 1,380 lb (626 kg)
- Powerplant: 1 × Pratt & Whitney Wasp Junior radial, 470 hp (350 kW)
- Propellers: 2-bladed variable-pitch propeller

Performance

- Maximum speed: 176 kn (202 mph, 325 km/h) average achieved during races
