= Florida Air Museum =

American aircraft museum

- Location within Florida
- Established: 1986
- Location: Lakeland, Florida
- Coordinates: 27.981955°N 82.029467°W
- Type: Aviation attraction
- Collection size: over 40 aircraft
- President: J.R. "Lites" Leenhouts
- Website: Official Website

The Florida Air Museum, formerly known as the International Sport Aviation Museum and the SUN 'n FUN Air Museum, is designated as Florida's "Official Aviation Museum and Education Center".

== Facility ==
The museum is housed in a main building and a hangar annex. Both are located on the campus of the Sun 'n Fun fly-in and expo, which supplies much of the funding for the museum's collections and programs. The entire campus is located at the Lakeland Linder International Airport, just south of the runways.

The main building holds much of the collection, especially smaller aircraft like a Boeing-Stearman Model 75 from the classic Red Baron Pizza aerobatic team. A wide variety of unique designs, homebuilts, and even a Mercury rocket motor share the display floor. The aircraft are supplemented by a collection of engines from World War I to the present day. It also houses a library, offices, a conference room and the museum's small gift shop. The hangar annex houses larger aircraft and engines.

Also on campus is the Buehler Restoration Center. This 8,000-square-foot facility, located adjacent to the Florida Air Museum at SUN 'n FUN, houses SUN 'n FUN's year–round aircraft restoration activities. The facility, which opened in April 2006, was made possible by a $300,000 grant from The Emil Buehler Perpetual Trust, with additional support from a State of Florida Cultural Facilities and Historical Grant.

== Collection ==
The museum's collection includes some unique and notable aircraft, including many homebuilt aircraft:

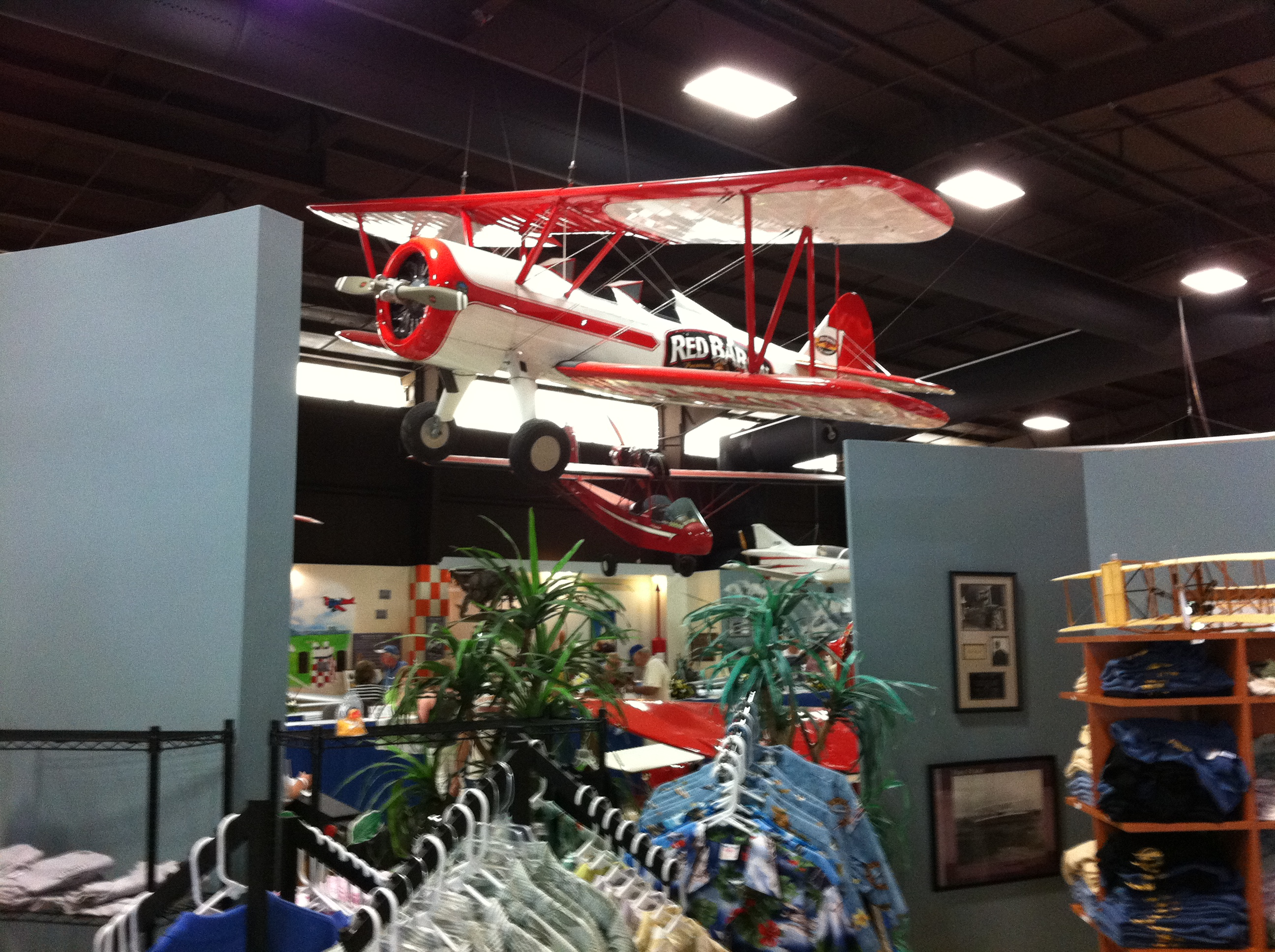
One of the famous Red Baron Pizza aerobatic team's Stearmans on display.

- Aeronca LB NC15292 - built in 1934 and restored on site
- Aerosport Woody Pusher N100FQ - built in 1930
- Anglin Space Walker II N168CM - built in 1994
- Bede BD-5 Micro N51GB - original pusher propeller design
- Boeing 727-233 N265FE - a 1979 cargo model donated by FedEx and being converted to a classroom/meeting space
- Boeing-Stearman Model 75 - from the now-retired Red Baron Squadron aerobatic team
- Cirrus VK-30 N94CM - built in 1993, this was the first Cirrus Aircraft design and was sold as a kit for homebuilders. Displayed on Sun 'N Fun campus grounds
- Colomban Cri-cri MC-12 "Cricket" N98DJ - built in 1983, this aircraft is the world's smallest twin-engined crewed aircraft
- Command-Aire MR-1 "Little Rocket racer" N345JA
- Convair F2Y Sea Dart - pylon-mounted at the entrance to the main building, the Sea Dart was the only seaplane to ever exceed the speed of sound
- Culver Model V NC134K - built in 1946
- Denney Kitfox N3LB - built in 1989
- Dyke Delta N18DW - built in 1972
- Douglas DC-3 N839M - originally built in 1943 as a C-47 Skytrain and later converted to a DC-3 for passenger service
- Ford Flivver N3218 - reproduction built in 1994
- Heath Super Parasol N88EG - built in 1934
- Greene Lovings Love N100PH - built in 1976
- Grumman F-14 Tomcat - on long-term loan from the National Naval Aviation Museum
- Grumman G-44 Widgeon – N404Q on loan from the Fantasy of Flight air museum
- Laird Baby Biplane - reproduction
- Lockheed T-33 Shooting Star - in Thunderbirds colors; pylon-mounted at the front gate
- Lockheed XFV Vertical Riser - restored onsite
- Mignet Pou-du-Ciel "Flying Flea" - built in 1979
- M-Squared Breese 2 - only aircraft inside of the museum to have seen combat; was used to drop bombs on Guerilla fighters
- Northrop Radioplane Drone
- Piel CP-30 Emeraude N31EB - built in 1975
- Pietenpol Air Camper N3513 - reproduction on 1929 model built in 1967
- Pitts Special S-1 N58P - built in 1972 by Paul Poberezny
- Pitts Special S-1C N5LU - built in 1983
- Quickie N303Q - built in 1989
- Rans S-9 Chaos N218ER
- RotorWay Exec N824DL - displayed on Sun 'N Fun campus grounds
- Sorrell Hiperbipe N135HB - built in 1995, displayed on Sun 'N Fun campus grounds
- Rozière Balloon Capsule - on long-term loan by Kermit Weeks from Fantasy of Flight
- Stits SA-11-A Playmate N77JA
- Sunshine Clipper N62SC - built and donated by Henry Palmer, displayed on Sun 'N Fun campus grounds
- Wittman Chief Oshkosh N14855 - built 1931
- Wittman Tailwind N314T - built 1962

== See also ==
- List of aerospace museums
