= Laird LC-B =

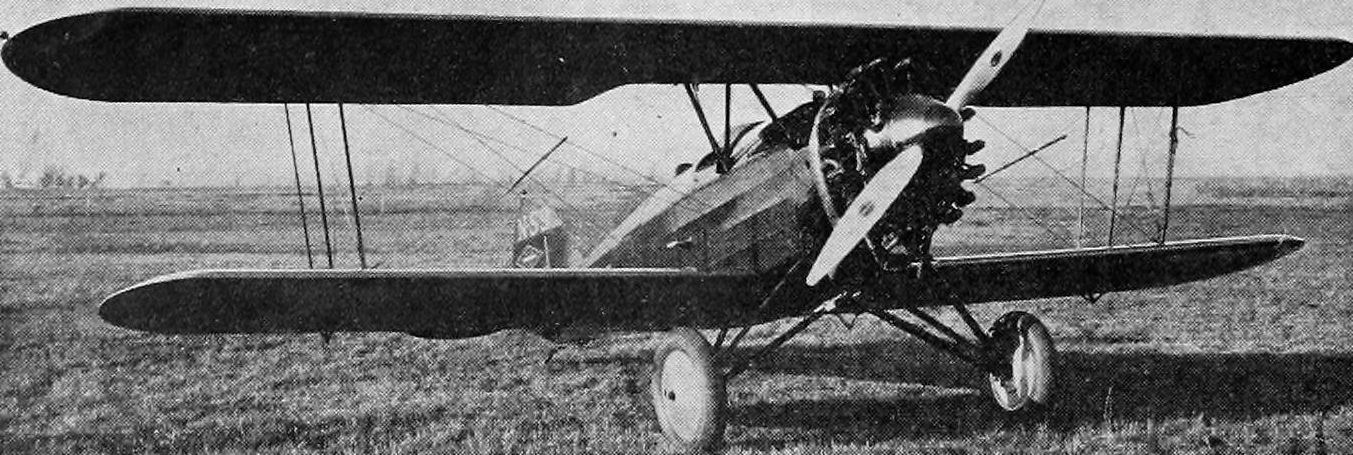
- Laird LC-B in 1927

General information
- Type: Two passenger civil transport
- National origin: United States
- Manufacturer: E. M. Laird Airplane Company
- Number built: about 35

History
- First flight: 1925

The Laird LC-B was a three seat, single-engined biplane, built for private owners in the U.S. in the late 1920s and offering a variety of engines. About 35 had been built before production ceased in the mid-1930s. Two have been restored to flight.

== Design and development ==
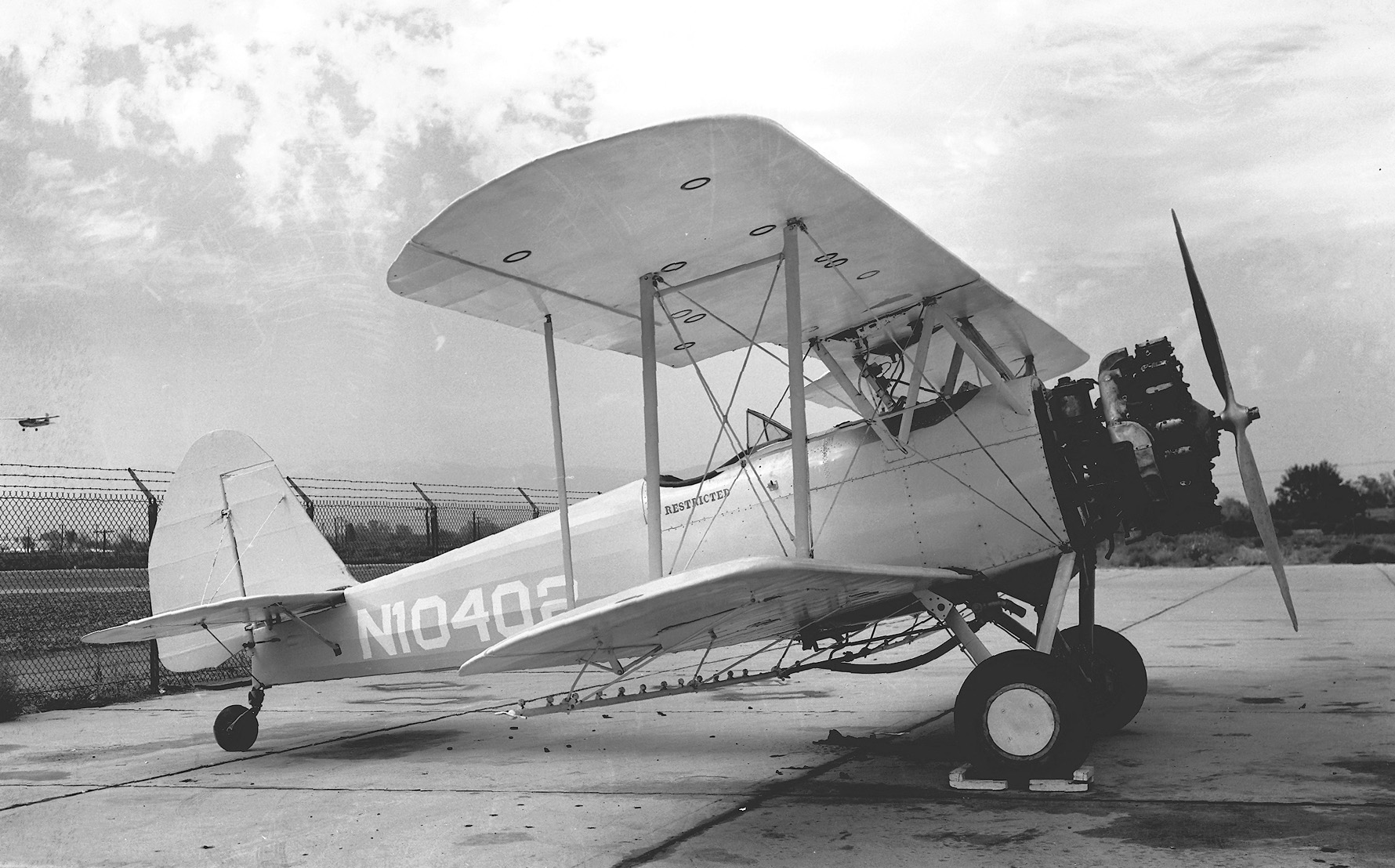
Laird LC-1B300 after conversion to a sprayer in 1952. Extensive modifications were made to the rudder, fin, and cockpits, and a Lycoming R-680 had been installed in place of the Wright.

Many Laird aircraft were designated as LC (Laird Commercial). This was followed by an airframe code, B in this case, and an engine code. In the case of the LC-B the latter was the engine power; later types had a single letter code such as W for Wasp.

All LC-B variants were unequal span single bay biplanes which seated three in two open cockpits. Though some sources suggest the wing dimensions varied between models, detailed contemporary reports of current models in 1927 and 1931 show no difference in spans, and lengths that depend only slightly on engine type.

The LB-Bs had wings of rectangular plan out to rounded tips, built around twin spruce box spars, plywood and spruce ribs and fabric-covered. They were single bay biplanes, their wings braced together with only slight stagger by a pair of parallel interplane struts on each side. Outward-leaning, N-form cabane struts joined the fuselage to the upper wing centre section. Ailerons were fitted to both upper and lower wings and externally interconnected. There were long, near-rectangular cut-outs in the upper wings to improve the field of view from the pilot's cockpit.

The principal difference between the LC-B subtypes was the engine fitted. The earliest models were mostly fitted with 200–220 hp (150–160 kW) Wright J-4/5 Whirlwinds, though Curtiss radial engines could also be used. By 1930, most had either the Wright J-5 300 hp (220 kW) or the Wright J-6. Behind the engine the fuselage had a dural tube structure and was fabric-covered. The two passengers sat side-by-side under the upper wing in an easily accessed open cockpit. Tail surfaces were also fabric-covered and, with the exception of the wooden-framed tailplane, had steel structures. All the rear surfaces were full and rounded, apart from the tailplane's straight leading edge. The rudder was balanced.

The LC-Bs had fixed, split axle, conventional landing gear. The main legs, with rubber cord shock absorbers, and drag struts were mounted on the lower fuselage longerons. Wheel brakes were fitted on 1930s variants at least. The axles joined on a short frame just below the fuselage underside. A long tailskid extended from the extreme fuselage.

== Operational history ==
The year of the first flight of the LC-B is variously given as 1924 or 1925. 11 of the 1925 LC-B series were built, one setting a record for the number of inside loops flown continuously (1,073). The pilot was Charles "Speed" Holman.

Two LC-Rs with 220 hp (160 kW) J-5 Whirlwind engines were built in 1928. They were single seat racers, one competing in the 1930 Nationals.

Less than ten further aircraft were built in the 1930-1 batch and a further 11 of the wider LC-1Bs in 1935 ended LC-B production at a total of less than 34. Others have it as 36. Most of these were registered in the U.S. but four LB-200s went to Canada.

After World War II one LC-1B300, N10402, was operated as a crop sprayer. Carefully restored, it still flies, owned by the Western Antique Aeroplane & Automobile Museum. In 2011 an airworthy LC-B200, NC6906, was in the Howie Collection in Decatur, Illinois. CF-APY, a B200, was flying until at least 2008, but has been on display since 2014 or earlier at the Reynolds Alberta Museum.

== Variants ==
Data from Aerofiles:Laird

LC-B
1925. 200–450 hp (150–340 kW) Wright Whirlwind or lower power Curtiss engines. Dimensions as LC-B. 11 built.
LC-R
1928. 220 hp (160 kW) Wright J-5 Whirlwind engine. 2 built.
LC-1B285
1930. Wright J-6 Whirlwind engine.
LC-1B285
1930. Wright J-6 Whirlwind engine.
LC-B300
1930. 300 hp (220 kW) Wright J-6 Whirlwind engine.
LC-1B300
1930. De-luxe B300, with NACA cowling.
LC-B200
1931. 220 hp (160 kW) Wright J-5 Whirlwind engine.
LC-1B200
1931. De-luxe B200, with NACA cowling.
LC-1B
1935. Wider fuselage than other LC-Bs. 11 built.

== Specifications (LC-B300) ==
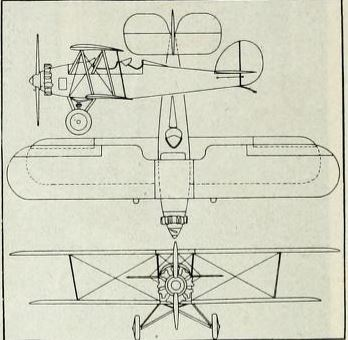

Data from Aero Digest (April 1931)

General characteristics

- Crew: one
- Capacity: two passengers
- Length: 23 ft 9 in (7.24 m)
- Upper wingspan: 34 ft (10 m)
- Lower wingspan: 30 ft (9.1 m)
- Height: 9 ft 3 in (2.82 m)
- Wing area: 295 sq ft (27.4 m^{2})
- Empty weight: 1,930 lb (875 kg)
- Gross weight: 3,020 lb (1,370 kg)
- Fuel capacity: 76 US gal (63 imp gal; 290 L)
- Powerplant: 1 × Wright J-6 Whirlwind radial, 300 hp (220 kW)
- Propellers: 2-bladed Hamilton-Standard

Performance

- Maximum speed: 150 mph (240 km/h, 130 kn)
- Cruise speed: 120 mph (190 km/h, 100 kn)
- Landing speed: 45 mph (72 km/h; 39 kn)
- Range: 550 mi (890 km, 480 nmi)
- Rate of climb: 1,600 ft/min (8.1 m/s)
