= Laird Super Solution =

1930s airplane

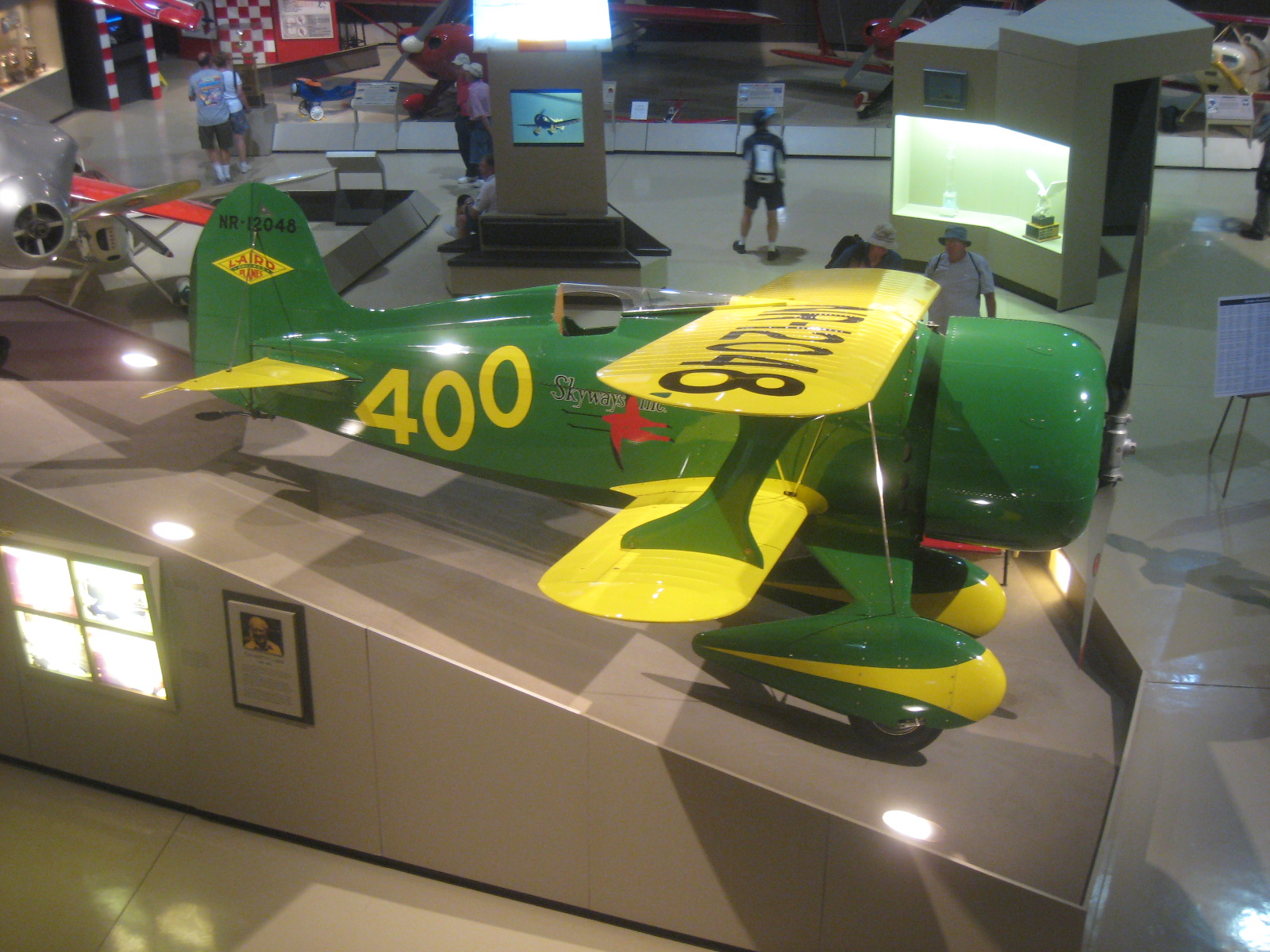
- Laird Super Solution replica at the EAA Aviation Museum

General information
- Type: Racing aircraft
- National origin: United States of America
- Manufacturer: E. M. Laird Airplane Company
- Designer: E. M. Matty Laird, Raoul J. Hoffman
- Status: under restoration
- Number built: 1

History
- First flight: 22 August 1931
- Developed from: Laird Solution

The Laird LC-DW300 and LC-DW500 Super Solution aka "Sky Buzzard" was a racing biplane built in the early 1930s by Matty Laird for the Cleveland Speed Foundation, Laird was already famous in the air racing circuit. It had a large radial engine and an extremely faired windshield. Other than being a biplane, it was similar in appearance to the Gee Bee, a more famous racer from the period. It was an advanced design for the time because of the relatively clean aerodynamic construction and tight engine cowling.

The Super Solution was the first winner of the Bendix Trophy race from Burbank, California to Cleveland, Ohio, where it was flown by Maj. James H. Doolittle.

== Development ==
Construction of the Super Solution started on 8 July 1931. The aircraft was complete and test flown at Ashborn Field in Chicago by 22 August 1931. Further changes were made by the Christopher Bros. in Wichita, Kansas, in 1932, such as raising the seat, installing a sliding canopy, and adding retractable landing gear.

== Design ==
Two Pratt & Whitney R-985 Wasp Junior S2A engine were used in the Solution, the second having gears added to allow lower propeller rpm with a larger propeller. The engines ran with high-compression pistons and "doped" leaded fuel. Both produced over 500 hp from the standard Wasp Junior S2A engine of the day.

== Operational history ==
Initial flight tests proved the aircraft required more rudder area to maintain stability and the fixed pitch propeller needed to be adjusted to allow takeoffs under a mile in length.

- 1931 National Air Races piloted by Jimmy Doolittle won the Bendix Trophy at a 223 mph average speed.
- 1931 Thompson Trophy - Trial runs proved difficult, with aileron reversal occurring at speed. The main wing spar crushed from race loads, required steel patches. Doolittle dropped out of the race with engine trouble due to a scuffed piston.
- 1931 In October, Doolittle flew the Super Solution on a flight between Ottawa, Ontario, Washington D.C., and Mexico City, setting a new speed record between the three capitals of 12 hours, 36 minutes.
- 1932 In August, the Shell Oil sponsored Solution was test flown by Doolittle with new retractable gear. The aircraft was damaged in a gear-up landing, and Doolittle switched to the Gee Bee R-1. The Solution was shipped to Shell Oil in St.Louis, then donated to the Smithsonian's National Air and Space Museum by the Swallow Aircraft Company in 1948.

== On display ==
- The EAA has a Super Solution replica in their museum in Oshkosh, Wisconsin. It was presented in 1981 by Jimmy Doolittle and Mattie Laird.
- Jim Moss of Washington state built the only flying reproduction, which is currently on display at Fantasy of Flight in Polk City, Florida.

== Specifications (Laird Super Solution) ==
Data from Sport Aviation

General characteristics

- Capacity: 1
- Length: 19 ft 6 in (5.94 m)
- Wingspan: 21 ft (6.4 m)
- Wing area: 112 sq ft (10.4 m^{2})
- Empty weight: 1,580 lb (717 kg)
- Gross weight: 2,842 lb (1,289 kg)
- Fuel capacity: 112 U.S. gallons (420 L; 93 imp gal)
- Powerplant: 1 × Pratt & Whitney Wasp Junior S2A 9-cylinder air-cooled radial piston engine, 535 hp (399 kW) running on doped fuel with high compression pistons
- Propellers: 2-bladed variable-pitch propeller

Performance

- Wing loading: 27.16 lb/sq ft (132.6 kg/m^{2})
