= Emil Matthew Laird =

American pioneer aircraft designer, pilot, and businessman (1895-1982)

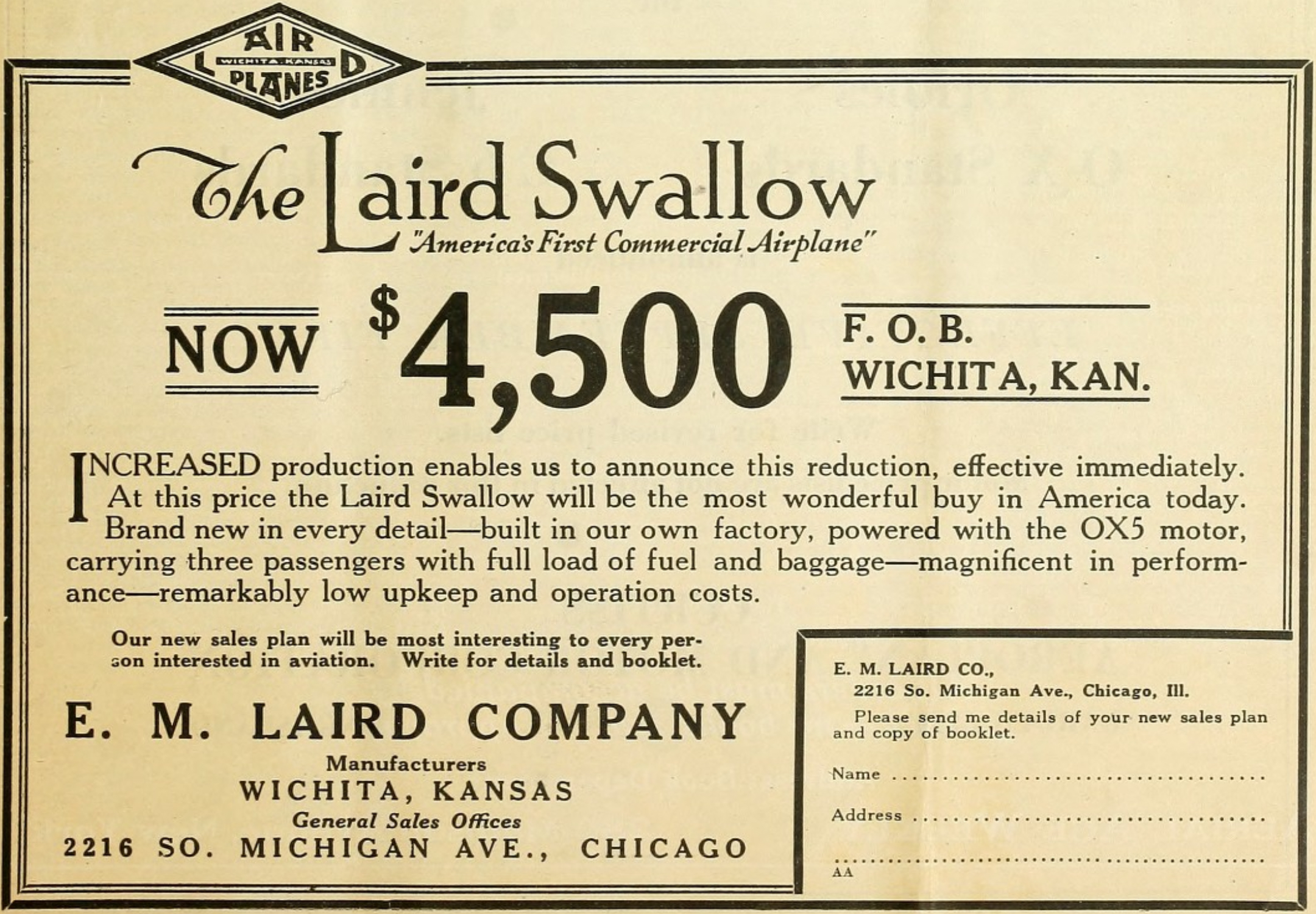
- 1921 ad for The Laird Swallow, "America's First Commercial Airplane"
- Born: November 29, 1895; St. Charles, Illinois, US
- Died: December 18, 1982 (aged 87); Palm Beach, Florida, US
- Other name: Matty Laird
- Known for: Air racing; Aerospace engineering; Manufacturing; Barnstorming
- Spouse: Elsie Laird

Emil Matthew Laird (November 29, 1895 – December 18, 1982) was a pioneering American aircraft designer, builder, pilot, and businessman. He put the first commercial aircraft into production at his E. M. Laird Aviation Company.

== Biography ==
=== Childhood, airplane designer, and barnstormer ===
Laird was born on November 29, 1896 and grew up in Chicago. His father died in 1909. A year later, after Laird completed eighth grade, he was forced to go to work to help support his mother and three siblings. He found a job as an office boy at the First National Bank of Chicago.

While working at the bank, Laird had his first experience with aviation. He watched Walter Brookins fly a Wright Model A in Chicago's Grant Park. Laird later described the experience, "I was so thrilled with seeing him fly and maneuver around the land that I said right then and there that I wanted part of it and made up my mind I was going to have it. I didn't know how, but I would." Towards that end he started building models and joined a model airplane club.

Laird's first full-size aircraft was a bicycle with glider wings attached that he built at the age of 15. He then built a monoplane of his own design in his mother's attic and flew it on September 15, 1913, getting 10 feet (3.0 m) off the ground. Four months later, he managed to get twice as high. Laird used the plane to teach himself to fly. After a friend crashed the plane and heavily damaged it, Laird and his friends scavenged its parts and built his second plane, the Laird Baby Biplane, which was completed in 1914. Laird flew the Baby Biplane in local meets.

The promoter Bill Pickens heard of Laird's flights in the tiny biplane and hired him to demonstrate aircraft. Laird was paid $350 just to take off and circle a field in the early days of skeptical onlookers. Over the next three years Laird performed as a barnstorming pilot at county fairs all over the Midwest. He also worked during the winter at the Sloan Aircraft plant in Bround Brook, New Jersey, primarily to learn how to better build planes by working under skilled craftsmen. Eventually, Laird became one of the best-known exhibition flyers in the United States.

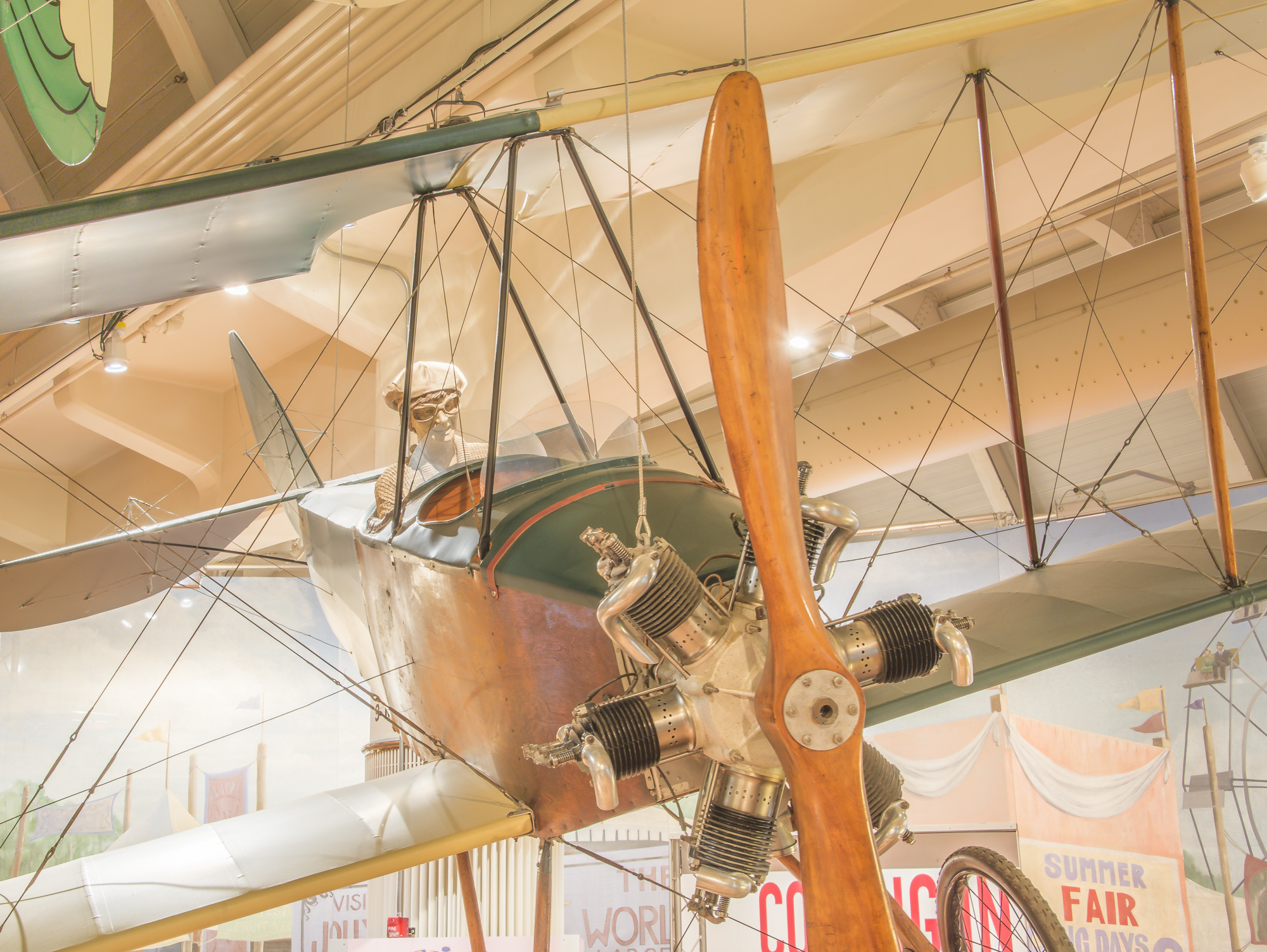
Laird 1915 Biplane, also known as Boneshaker. This plane was used by Laird and Katherine Stinson for exhibition flights and received significant attention.

During this period, Laird and some colleagues also built a larger biplane. Laird's 1915 Biplane became known as "Boneshaker" due to the strong vibrations created by its 45-horsepower, six-cylinder Anzani radial engine. With this plane Laird was able to perform several challenging aerobatic maneuvers, including the loop-the-loop. At that time only a handful of American exhibition pilots had both the skill and a plane with enough power and structural strength to perform a loop. In 1916, Laird loaned this plane to Katherine Stinson for the first tour of an airplane in Japan and China. Both Stinson's flying and Laird's plane garnered significant international attention during the tour. This plane is on display at the Henry Ford Museum.

In March, 1917, Laird was testing a new biplane built by another designer. During one of the test flights the plane entered a spin from which Laird could not recover. The resulting crash broke numerous of Laird's bones and he almost lost a leg. He was in the hospital for months and ended up with an improperly knitted elbow, which disqualified him from military service during World War I. Towards the end of the war he returned to Chicago to build airplanes.

=== Business owner and airplane designer ===
In 1920, Laird was recruited to start building airplanes in Wichita, Kansas, and he co-founded the E. M. Laird Aviation Company with his brother Charles Laird and investors William A. Burke and Jacob Mollendick to build an aircraft called the Swallow. Over the next four years, about 43 Swallows were built. The Swallow set the standard for light biplanes for the coming decade. Among the company's approximately 20 employees was draftsman Lloyd Stearman and pilot-salesman Walter Beech. Barnstormer Clyde Cessna was an early customer. These three men later founded the Travel Air company and then each formed his own aviation company.

After a disagreement with the company's major stockholder, Laird left the company in 1923 and founded the E. M. Laird Airplane Company to build commercial aircraft such as the Laird Commercial and custom designs. Laird retained sole ownership of the new company and did not accept outside capital, even during the Great Depression. As a result, the company was relatively small, never exceeding 85 employees, but it built a reputation for sleek, rugged, and fast airframes and high quality products.

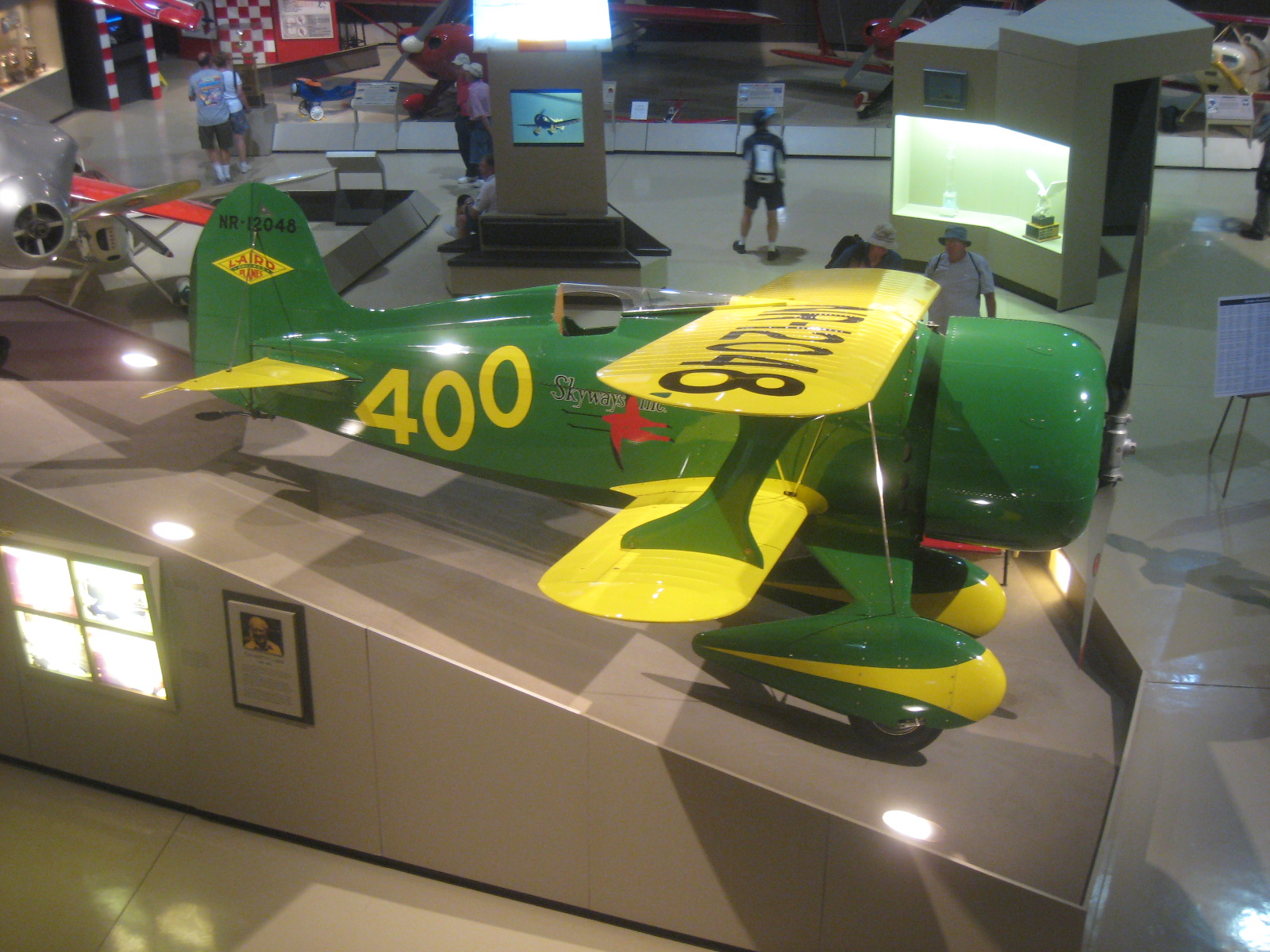
Laird LC-DW500 Super Solution racing biplane. The Super Solution was the first winner of the Bendix Trophy race from Burbank to Cleveland where it was flown by Maj. James H. Doolittle.

In 1930, Laird was approached about developing an entry for the 1930 Thompson Trophy Race. In three weeks Laird and his staff developed the Laird LC-DW300 Solution, which won the race. This was just one of multiple notable Laird racers—including Super Solution and the Laird-Turner RT-14 Meteor—and major wins, including the first Bendix Trophy race in 1931 and the 1938 and 1939 Thompson Trophy races. Laird had the reputation of getting more speed with less horsepower than other designers, in large part due to the quality of workmanship. During the 1930s, to complement income from developing aircraft, the company also successfully bid on work to support the growing airline passenger industry, such as refurbishing DC-3 fuel tanks and building passenger loading stands.

=== World War II and retirement ===
In anticipation of the United States entering World War II, Laird closed his plant in July 1941, and he became vice president of a manufacturing company in Laporte, Indiana (which later became Laporte Corp.). He brought with him all of his factory machinery, equipment, and materials. Despite starting with an untrained workforce, Laird led the company in successfully meeting rapidly expanding wartime needs for a wide range of components, including B-24 and SB2C vertical fins, complete empennage groups for Martin B-26s, wing flaps, radio cabinets, and crew bunks.

After the war, Laird was concerned about business prospects for civil aviation. He was also wanted to pursue treatments for his daughter, who had contracted polio. At the time, the standard treatment was frequent immersions in warm water along with physical therapy. As a result of both factors, Laird retired and he and his wife moved their family to Boca Raton, Florida.

In retirement, Laird was active in multiple aviation history efforts. This included serving as president of the Early Birds of Aviation. He was also involved with restorations of his 1930s racers Solution and Super Solution.

Laird died in Palm Beach, Florida at the age of 87.

== Legacy ==
He was inducted into the Kansas Aviation Hall of Fame in 1999.
