= Laird LC-EW =

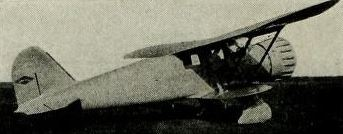

General information
- Type: One-off private civil transport
- National origin: United States
- Manufacturer: Laird
- Number built: 1

History
- First flight: late 1934

The Laird LC-EW was a six seat cabin sesquiplane designed for the industrialist George Horton. It first flew in 1934.

== Design and development ==
Many Laird aircraft were designated as LC (Laird Commercial). In most cases this was followed by an airframe code, here E and an engine code, here W for Wasp. The LC-EW was designed to an order from the industrialist George Horton, who had previously owned the sole Laird LC-AA, first flown in 1928.

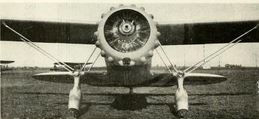

It was a true sesquiplane, with a lower wingspan slightly less than half that of the upper. Both wings were essentially rectangular in plan out to rounded tips. The upper wing was built around spruce spars with plywood ribs and fabric covered. Upper and lower wings were braced together with parallel pairs of wide spread, transverse, streamlined V-struts on each side. Their apices on the lower wing were immediately above the landing legs. Between the fuselage and the legs the lower wing was constructed of Cr/Mo steel tubing and aluminium alloy-skinned; beyond, its structure was the same as that of the upper wing. Aluminium alloy ailerons were hinged only on the upper wings, filling about half the span. The inner lower wing carried flaps of similar construction. Both upper and lower wings contained fuel tanks.

The LC-EW was powered by a 450 hp (340 kW), nine cylinder Pratt & Whitney Wasp C radial engine driving a two-bladed propeller and tightly enclosed under a long chord, NACA cowling, though bumped out over the rocker boxes to reduce its diameter. Aft, the fuselage was an all-metal aluminium alloy structure with multiple frames, stiffeners and metal skin. The pilots, or pilot and fifth passenger, sat side by side at the front of the cabin and had dual controls, including a central Y-type control column. Radio was fitted, with an external aerial. The ventilated, heated cabin had three windows on each side and was entered by a starboard-side door; its four passenger seats had safety belts. There was a baggage compartment and toilet at the rear. At the rear the tail was conventional with its cantilever tailplane at mid-fuselage. The tail surfaces were all metal constructions, similar to the fuselage. The tailplane had a blunted triangular profile and carried blunted rectangular elevators. Fin and unbalanced rudder had similar profiles to the horizontal tail plans.

Its fixed, conventional landing gear, with a track of 8 ft 10 in (2.69 m), had short, vertical oleo legs encased in fairings at the ends of the inner section of the lower wings. Each had a pneumatically-tyred wheel, also under a fairing. The castoring tail wheel was also on an oleo strut.

== Operational history ==
Little is known about its short history in Horton's ownership. He died in 1935 and the LC-EW was bequeathed to the aeronautical department of the Rensselaer Institute.

== Specifications ==
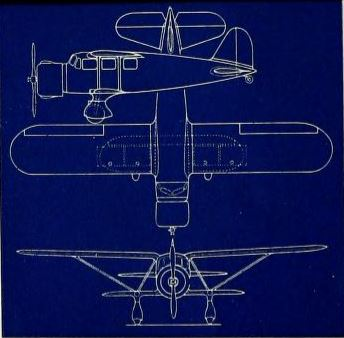

Data from Aero Digest, January 1935.

General characteristics

- Crew: one or two
- Capacity: five or four passengers
- Length: 27 ft 6 in (8.38 m)
- Upper wingspan: 38 ft (12 m)
- Lower wingspan: 17 ft 6 in (5.33 m)
- Height: 8 ft 8 in (2.64 m)
- Wing area: 250 sq ft (23 m^{2}) total
- Empty weight: 3,205 lb (1,454 kg)
- Gross weight: 5,350 lb (2,427 kg)
- Payload: 1,170 lb (530 kg)
- Fuel capacity: 150 US gal (120 imp gal; 570 L)
- Powerplant: 1 × Pratt & Whitney Wasp C nine cylinder radial, 450 hp (340 kW)
- Propellers: 2-bladed Hamilton Standard metal, variable pitch

Performance

- Maximum speed: 200 mph (320 km/h, 170 kn)
- Cruise speed: 175 mph (282 km/h, 152 kn)
- Landing speed: 58 mph (93 km/h; 50 kn), flaps down
- Range: 850 mi (1,370 km, 740 nmi)
- Service ceiling: 21,000 ft (6,400 m)
