= AEG Wagner Eule =

German reconnaissance aircraft

Eule
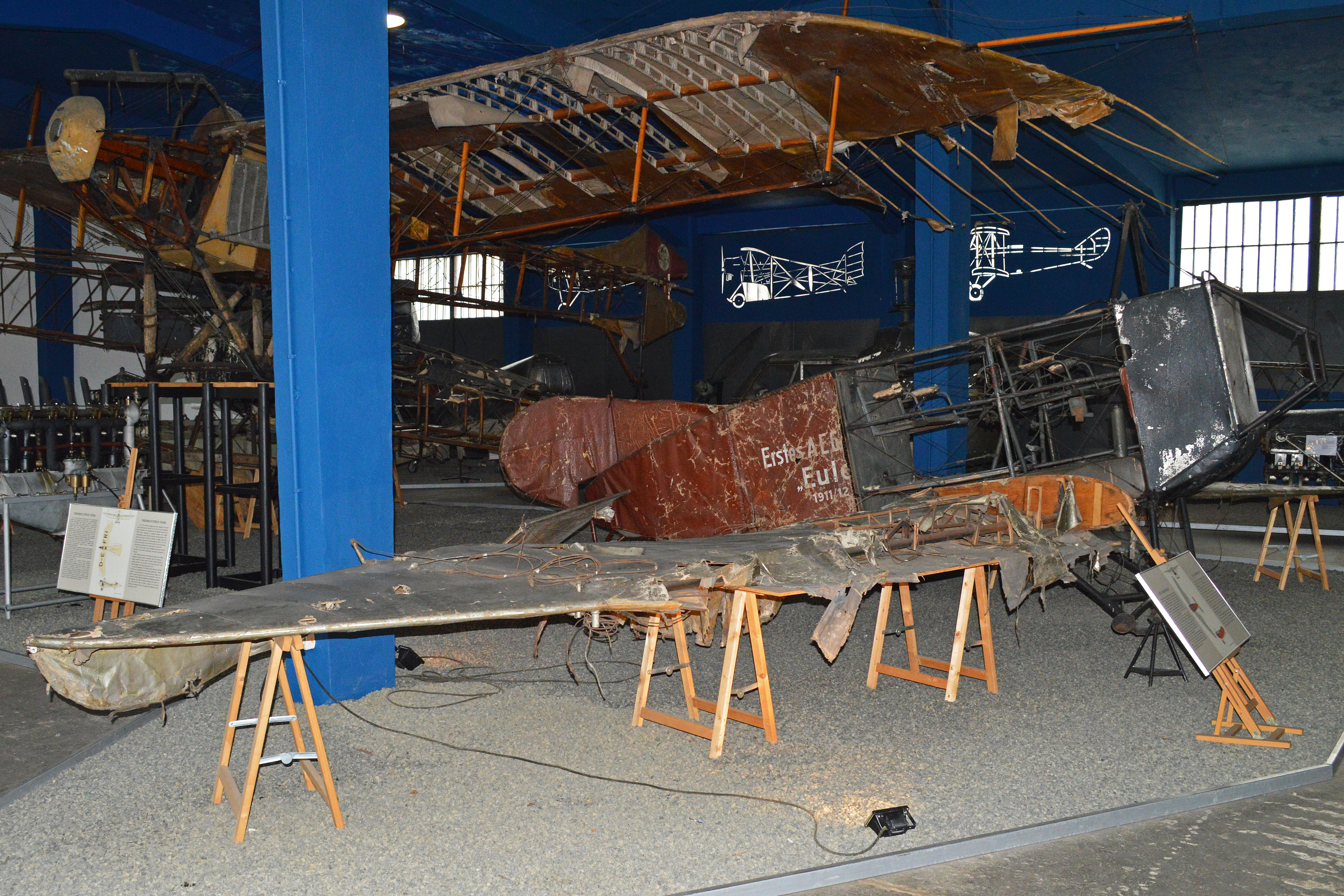
- The AEG Wagner Eule at the Polish Aviation Museum, Kraków

General information
- National origin: Germany
- Manufacturer: Allgemeine Elektrizitäts-Gesellschaft
- Designer: Ing Wagner
- Primary user: Luftstreitkräfte
- Number built: 2

History
- First flight: 1915

The AEG Wagner Eule was a German reconnaissance aircraft built in 1914 by Allgemeine Electricitäts Gesellschaft.

== Development ==
The Eule (English: Owl) was one of a series of aircraft developed by the German electrical company AEG. Designed by an engineer named Wagner (first name unknown), the single engine, two seat, mid-wing monoplane aircraft featured a fuselage of welded steel tubes with fabric covering and a wing of oak wood with fabric covering. The fuselage measured 4.77 meters with a cross section of 110 cm x 98 cm. The wings were tapered and featured a scalloped, bat-like trailing edge and a curving leading edge, with an overall look that was much like that of a bird or bat.

The first prototype was built with a Gnome rotary engine and was used for taxi tests. It was engulfed in a fire during the test period when a fire broke out during a repair being made on the aircraft's fuel tank. The second prototype of the aircraft was equipped with either a rotary engine or an inline 4-cylinder engine from a Ford Model T. A few short flights were carried out to test the aerodynamic characteristics of the prototype before the design was abandoned.

The unusual wing configuration was not featured in AEG's subsequent aircraft designs, however, the welded metal framed, fabric-covered fuselage was carried forward into AEG's B, C, and J class aircraft.

Subsequently, the Eule prototype was put on display in the AEG aircraft assembly hall. Later, after the end of World War I, AEG donated the prototype to the German Aviation Collection in Berlin. During World War II, the Eule prototype was moved to German-occupied Poland and stored at Czarnków, near Poznań. In 1945, the Russians advanced into Poland and the aircraft, along with many other planes from the German Aviation Collection, were abandoned by retreating German forces.

The collection was then put into storage by the Polish government in the Technical Museum and thereafter, in 1963, was shipped to the Narodowe Museum Lotnictwa (Kraków Aviation Museum), where it was put in storage for future conservation.

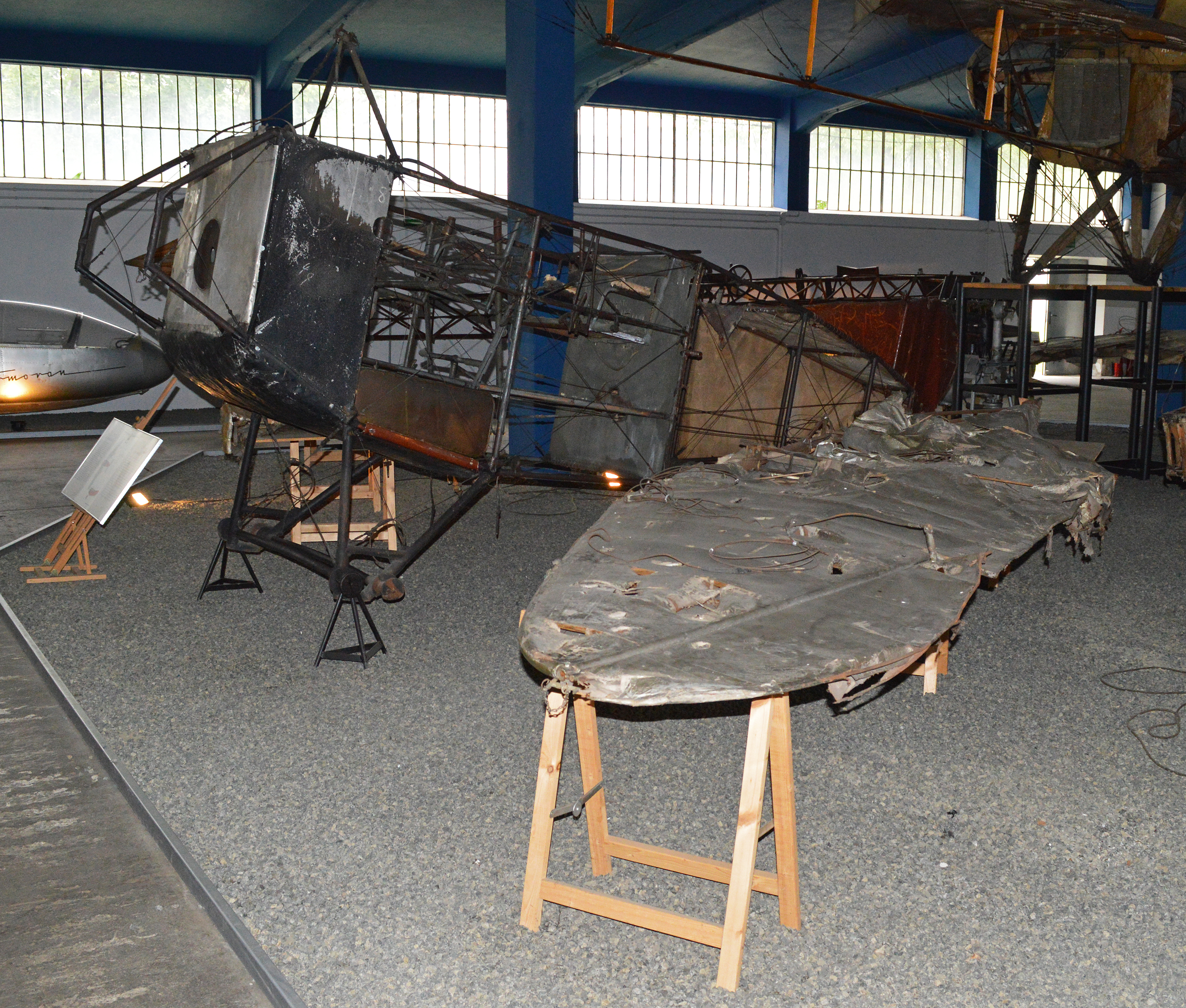

== Operators ==
German Empire

- Luftstreitkräfte

== Surviving aircraft ==
The only surviving prototype example is displayed in unrestored condition at the Narodowe Museum Lotnictwa in Kraków, Poland, having been displayed for the first time to the public in 2003 after years in storage. It was transferred to Deutsche Luftfahrt Sammlung prior to World War II. It was moved to Poland to protect it from Allied bombings.

== Specifications AEG Wagner Eule ==
General characteristics

- Powerplant: 1 × Gnome et Rhône Rotary

Performance

== See also ==
Related development

- AEG C.I
- AEG C.II
- AEG C.III
- AEG C.IV
- AEG C.V
