= Albatros B.III =

B.III
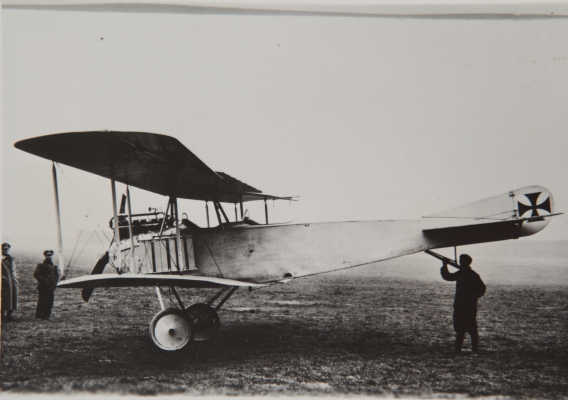

General information
- Type: reconnaissance
- National origin: Germany
- Manufacturer: Albatros Flugzeugwerke, Oeffag, OAW
- Designer: Ernst Heinkel

History
- Developed from: Albatros B.II

The Albatros B.III, (post-war company designation L.5), was a German World War I reconnaissance biplane, built by Albatros Flugzeugwerke as the Albatros LDD.

== Development and design ==
The Albatros B.III was the last of the company's unarmed reconnaissance two-seaters and was a precursor to the most important of their armed reconnaissance biplanes, the C.III.

The changes from the previous versions were fairly minor. It introduced what would become the typical Albatros tail when the rudder was rounded off. It was otherwise similar to the B.II. The B.III was produced in small numbers during 1915, but it was already clear that reconnaissance aircraft needed to be armed. Albatros then produced the C.I, which was based on the earlier B.II, and then moved onto the C.III. With some additional detail changes the Albatros C.III was basically an armed version of the B.III, although few parts remained interchangeable between the two aircraft.

== Variants ==
- Albatros L.5 - post-war manufacturers' retroactive designation

== Operators ==
German Empire

- Luftstreitkräfte
- Kaiserliche Marine

Austria-Hungary

- Austro-Hungarian Imperial and Royal Aviation Troops

=== Units using this aircraft ===
FEA 6

== Specifications ==
Data from

General characteristics

- Crew: 2
- Length: 7.8 m (25 ft 7 in)
- Wingspan: 11 m (36 ft 1 in)
- Height: 3.15 m (10 ft 4 in)
- Wing area: 40.12 m^{2} (432 sq ft)
- Empty weight: 723 kg (1,594 lb)
- Gross weight: 1,071 kg (2,361 lb)
- Powerplant: 1 × Mercedes D.II inline piston or 1 Daimler D I, D II, Argus As II or Bz III , 90 kW (120 hp)

Performance

- Maximum speed: 120 km/h (75 mph, 65 kn)
- Endurance: 4 hours
- Service ceiling: 3,000 m (9,840 ft)

Armament

- None

== See also ==
Related development

- Albatros B.I
- Albatros B.II
- Albatros C.III

Aircraft of comparable role, configuration, and era

- AEG B.I
- AEG B.II
- AEG B.III
- Aviatik B.I
- Aviatik B.II
- Aviatik B.III
- DFW B.I & II
- LVG B.I, II & III
- Rumpler B.I

Related lists

- Idflieg aircraft designation system
- List of military aircraft of the Central Powers in World War I
- List of military aircraft of Germany by manufacturer

== Bibliography ==
- Gray, Peter; Thetford, Owen (1962). German Aircraft of the First World War. London: Putman.
- Herris, Jack (2016). Albatros Aircraft of WWI: Volume 1: Early Two-Seaters: A Centennial Perspective on Great War Airplanes. Great War Aviation Centennial Series. Vol. 24. n.p.: Aeronaut Books. ISBN 978-1-935881-47-6.
- Klaauw, Bart van der (March–April 1999). "Unexpected Windfalls: Accidentally or Deliberately, More than 100 Aircraft 'arrived' in Dutch Territory During the Great War". Air Enthusiast (80): 54–59. ISSN 0143-5450.
- Taylor, Michael J. H. (1990). Jane's Fighting Aircraft of World War I. London: Studio Editions. p. 141.
