= DFW D.I =

WWI German fighter aircraft

D.I

General information
- Type: Fighter aircraft
- Manufacturer: DFW
- Primary user: Luftstreitkräfte
- Number built: 3

History
- First flight: 1917

The DFW D.I was a German fighter aircraft produced during World War I.

== Design and development ==
The first DFW D.I prototype was similar to the DFW Floh with the exception of a 160 hp Mercedes D.III engine with a car-mounted radiator on the nose. The second prototype appeared months later fitted with twin Spandau machine guns, while the third prototype featured ailerons on the upper wingtips. The D.I first flew in 1917, leading to development of the DFW Dr.I triplane.

== Specifications ==
Data from

General characteristics

- Crew: 1
- Length: 4.5 m (14 ft 9.25 in)
- Wingspan: 6.2 m (20 ft 4.25 in)
- Height: 2.4 m (8 ft 2.25 in)
- Wing area: 15 m^{2} (160 sq ft)
- Empty weight: 420 kg (924 lb)
- Gross weight: 650 kg (1,430 lb)
- Powerplant: 1 × Mercedes D.I 6-cylinder water-cooled inline piston, 75 kW (100 hp)
- Propellers: 2-bladed

Performance

- Maximum speed: 160 km/h (100 mph, 87 kn)
- Endurance: 1½ hours

== Bibliography ==
- Herris, Jack (2017). DFW Aircraft of WWI: A Centennial Perspective on Great War Airplanes. Great War Aviation Centennial Series. Vol. 29. n.p.: Aeronaut Books. ISBN 978-1-935881-54-4.
