= Albatros C.X =

German military reconnaissance aircraft

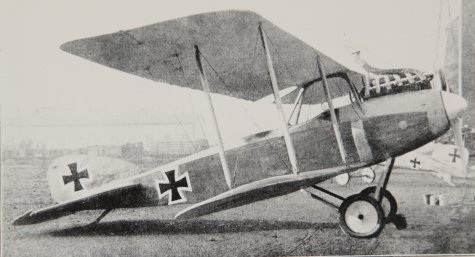
- Scale model of an Albatros C.X

General information
- Type: Reconnaissance aircraft
- Manufacturer: Albatros Flugzeugwerke
- Primary user: Luftstreitkräfte
- Number built: >300

The Albatros C.X was a military reconnaissance aircraft designed and produced by the German aircraft manufacturer Albatros Flugzeugwerke.

The C.X was essentially an enlarged development of the Albatros C.VII designed to take advantage of the new Mercedes D.IVa engine that became available in 1917. Unlike the C.VII that preceded it in service, the C.X utilised the top wing spar-mounted radiator that had first been tried on the C.V/17. Other important modernisation features included provision for oxygen for the crew and radio equipment. The C.X entered service with the Luftstreitkräfte during 1917 and saw active combat during the latter portion of the First World War.

== Design and development ==
What would become the Albatros C.X was designed fairly promptly after the emergence of the earlier Albatros C.VII. This predecessor aircraft had been hastily developed as a stop-gap measure following the abrupt end of production of the Albatros C.V due to severe engine issues. For the C.X, the company's design team sought to design a more long-term successor aircraft that would be capable of greater performance. Nonetheless, the design conformed with many of the established approaches and techniques in use by Albatros at that time; the single most distinctive feature of the C.X was its adoption of the Mercedes D.IVa engine, a relatively powerful engine for the time, being capable of generating up to 260 hp. The airframe also had considerably more generous proportions than the earlier models, despite its adherence to the same core design formula.

The fuselage of the C.X, akin to Albatros' earlier C series aircraft, was composed of plywood with slab-sided construction; it differed by being wider, longer, and deeper than any of its predecessors. This additional volume permitted the installation of new facilities and equipment, such as oxygen breathing apparatus in the forward cockpit, which was occupied by the pilot, while the observer's rear cockpit was furnished with an extensive radio set. Neither the tail surfaces nor the undercarriage, which were largely made up of plywood and steel tubing, had any substantial changes from those of the C.V.

The wings, which comprised two wooden box-spars and a two-bay cable-braced layout, were considerably revised, possessing a considerably larger span and area than earlier aircraft. Furthermore, the angular raked wingtips of its predecessors were dispensed with in favour of a more aerodynamic tip profile. Ailerons were installed near to all four wingtips that achieved relatively sensitive lateral control throughout the flight envelope; these on the wing's upper surfaces featured large rectangular inset balance positions. The root of the upper wing accommodated an aerofoil-type radiator to cool the engine; the shutter rate could be easily monitored and changed by the pilot according to the operating conditions. The new wing design was aimed at, in combination with the aircraft's relatively powerful engine, attaining the greatest possible altitude.

During 1917, the C.X entered service with the Luftstreitkräfte, where it was primarily used in both the aerial reconnaissance and artillery spotting roles. By October 1917, roughly 300 aircraft were believed to have been operational. In addition to Albatros, four other manufacturers were sub-contracted to produce the C.X to meet the urgent wartime demands of the Central Powers.

== Operators ==
German Empire

- Luftstreitkräfte

== Specifications (C.X) ==
Data from German Aircraft of the First World War

General characteristics

- Crew: two (pilot and observer)
- Length: 9.15 m (30 ft 0 in)
- Wingspan: 14.36 m (47 ft 1 in)
- Height: 3.4 m (11 ft 2 in)
- Wing area: 42.7 m^{2} (459 sq ft)
- Empty weight: 1,050 kg (2,320 lb)
- Gross weight: 1,668 kg (3,677 lb)
- Powerplant: 1 × Mercedes D.IVa , 190 kW (260 hp)

Performance

- Maximum speed: 175 km/h (110 mph, 96 kn)
- Endurance: Three hours and 25 minutes
- Service ceiling: 5,000 m (16,500 ft)
- Rate of climb: 3.3 m/s (660 ft/min)

Armament

- 1 × forward-firing 7.92 mm (.312 in) Spandau LMG 08/15 machine gun
- 1 × 7.92 mm (.312 in) Parabellum MG14 machine gun for observer
