= DFW C.I =

C.I and C.II

General information
- Type: Reconnaissance aircraft
- Manufacturer: DFW

The DFW C.I biplane reconnaissance aircraft built by the Deutsche Flugzeug-Werke (DFW) during the First World War for the Imperial German Army's (Deutsches Heer) Imperial German Air Service (Fliegertruppen des deutschen Kaiserreiches). First flown in 1915, the aircraft was built in small numbers. The C.II differed from the C.I by switching the positions of the pilot and observer, placing the former in the front cockpit. Surviving aircraft were withdrawn from front-line units and assigned to training units.

== Development ==
Derived from the company's B.II design of 1914, the C.I kept the same basic fuselage design with the pilot located behind the observer. The latter was provided with a 7.92-millimeter (0.312 in) Parabellum MG 14 machine gun on a ring mount. Curved steel tubes prevented him from firing into the propeller. The engine was upgraded to a water-cooled 150-horsepower (110 kW) Benz Bz.III straight-six engine. The fuel tank was moved to the underside of the upper wing and the side-mounted radiators were replaced by one installed below the leading edge of the upper wing in most of the C.Is.

The C.II was almost identical, except that it reversed the seating arrangements for the pilot and observer, placing the observer in the rear cockpit and eliminating the unnecessary tubing around the forward cockpit.

== Operational history ==
A total of 40 C.Is are known to have been built with aircraft noted on the strength reports of front-line units beginning in the last months of 1915. The aircraft was withdrawn from those units beginning in January 1916 because weak wing spars. The wings were rebuilt and the C.I began appearing in the strength reports in June with the last mention on 31 August 1917. The following month it began showing up in training units and was known to have served in them at least through February 1918.

Only a dozen C.IIs are known to have been built and photographic evidence shows that a few of them were used operationally, but none appear on the bimonthly strength reports, suggesting that they were soon withdrawn.

== Specifications (C.II) ==
Data from German Aircraft of the First World War

General characteristics

- Crew: 3
- Length: 7.2 m (23 ft 7 in)
- Wingspan: 11.2 m (36 ft 9 in)
- Wing area: 33 m^{2} (360 sq ft)
- Empty weight: 725 kg (1,598 lb)
- Gross weight: 1,235 kg (2,723 lb)
- Powerplant: 1 × Benz Bz.III water-cooled straight-six piston engine, 110 kW (150 hp)
- Propellers: 2-bladed

Performance

- Maximum speed: 140 km/h (87 mph, 76 kn)
- Service ceiling: 4,000 m (13,000 ft)

Armament

- 1 × 7.92 mm Parabellum MG14 on ring mount for observer

== Bibliography ==
- Gray, Peter & Thetford, Owen (1987) [1970]. German Aircraft of the First World War (2nd ed.). London: Putnam. ISBN 0-85177-809-7.
- Herris, Jack (2017). DFW Aircraft of WWI: A Centennial Perspective on Great War Airplanes. Great War Aviation Centennial Series. Vol. 29. n.p.: Aeronaut Books. ISBN 978-1-935881-54-4.
- Lamberton, W. M. (1962). Reconnaissance & Bomber Aircraft of the 1914-1918 War. Los Angeles, California: Aero Publishers. OCLC 1819866.
