= AEG C.V =

WWI German reconnaissance aircraft

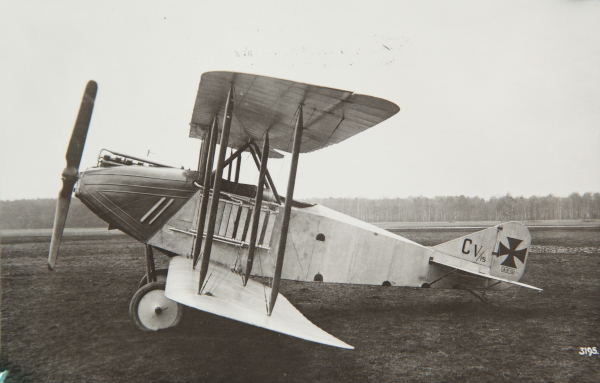

General information
- Type: Reconnaissance
- National origin: Germany
- Manufacturer: AEG
- Number built: 1

History
- First flight: February 1916
- Developed from: AEG C.IV

The AEG C.V was a prototype two-seat biplane reconnaissance aircraft built by the Allgemeine Elektricitäts-Gesellschaft (AEG) during the First World War for the Imperial German Army's (Deutsches Heer) Imperial German Air Service (Luftstreitkräfte). Designed to use a more powerful engine than previous AEG C-class reconnaissance aircraft, the aircraft proved inferior to competing prototypes using the same engine and further development was cancelled.

== Development ==
When the water-cooled 220-horsepower (160 kW) Mercedes D.IV straight-eight piston engine became available in December 1915 the Inspectorate of Flying Troops (Inspektion der Fliegertruppen (Idflieg) ordered prototype reconnaissance aircraft from AEG, Albatros and LVG. AEG designed the C.V roughly in parallel with the C.IV that used the Mercedes D.III straight-six engine and the two aircraft shared many features including the armament of one forward-firing 7.92 mm (.312 in) LMG 08/15 machine gun and a Parabellum MG 14 machine gun of the same caliber on a flexible mount for the observer.

The only prototype was completed in February 1916 and its performance was only slightly better than the C.IV despite its advantage of an additional 60 hp (45 kW); it was marginally faster with a slightly greater rate of climb. No documentation survives regarding its flight testing by Idflieg, but it was not selected for production, unlike the other two competitors. Presumably they had better performance or flying qualities than the C.V.

== Specifications ==
Data from German Aircraft of the First World War; A.E.G. Aircraft of WWI: A Centennial Perspective on Great War Airplanes

General characteristics

- Crew: 2
- Length: 7.6 m (24 ft 11 in)
- Upper wingspan: 13.26 m (43 ft 6 in)
- Lower wingspan: 12.45 m (40 ft 10 in)
- Wing area: 41.5 m^{2} (447 sq ft)
- Empty weight: 900 kg (1,984 lb)
- Gross weight: 1,432 kg (3,157 lb)
- Powerplant: 1 × Mercedes D.IV water-cooled straight-eight piston engine, 160 kW (220 hp)
- Propellers: 2-bladed

Performance

- Maximum speed: 165 km/h (103 mph, 89 kn)
- Time to altitude: 5 minutes to 1,000 m (3,300 ft)

Armament

- Guns: * 1 × forward-firing 7.92 mm (.312 in) LMG 08/15 machine gun
- 1 × 7.92 mm (.312 in) Parabellum MG 14 machine gun in ring mount for observer

== See also ==
Related development

- AEG C.IV

Aircraft of comparable role, configuration, and era

- Albatros C.V

== Bibliography ==
- Gray, Peter & Thetford, Owen (1987) [1970]. German Aircraft of the First World War (2nd ed.). London: Putnam. ISBN 0-85177-809-7.
- Herris, Jack (2015). A.E.G. Aircraft of WWI: A Centennial Perspective on Great War Airplanes. Great War Aviation Centennial Series. Vol. 16. n. p.: Aeronaut Books. ISBN 978-1-935881-28-5.
