= Lübeck-Travemünde F.2 =

1910s German reconnaissance floatplane

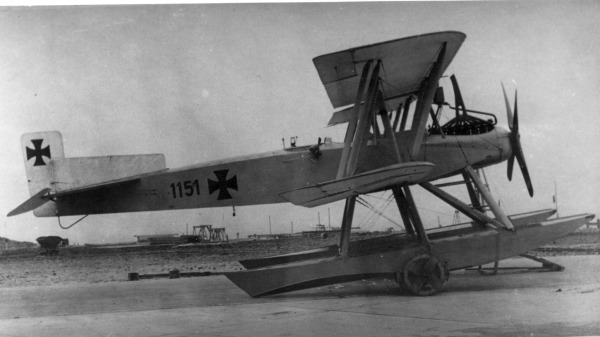

General information
- Type: Reconnaissance floatplane
- National origin: Germany
- Manufacturer: Flugzeugwerft Lübeck-Travemünde GmbH
- Primary user: German Navy
- Number built: 11

History
- Developed from: Lübeck-Travemünde F.1

The Lübeck-Travemünde F.2 was a 1910s German reconnaissance floatplane. The F.2 was an improved version of the company's earlier F.1 floatplane and was the first armed aircraft built by Flugzeugwerft Lübeck-Travemünde GmbH, a subsidiary of Deutsche Flugzeug-Werke. The F.2 was a twin-float biplane powered by a 220 hp (164 kW) Mercedes D.IV engine. With a crew of two (pilot and observer), the observer's rear cockpit was fitted with a 7.92 mm (0.31 in) Parabellum machine gun. Eleven aircraft were built.

== Operators ==
German Empire

- Kaiserliche Marine

Norway

- Royal Norwegian Navy Air Service (F.4)

== Specifications ==
General characteristics

- Crew: 2 (pilot, observer)
- Wingspan: 19.00 m (62 ft 4 in)
- Powerplant: 1 × Mercedes D.IV , 164 kW (220 hp)

Performance Armament

- 1 × 7.92 mm (0.31 in) Parabellum machine-gun

== See also ==
Related development

- Lübeck-Travemünde F.1

Related lists

- List of flying boats and floatplanes
- List of military aircraft of Germany
