= LFG Roland Pfeilflieger =

1910s German military aircraft

Pfeilflieger
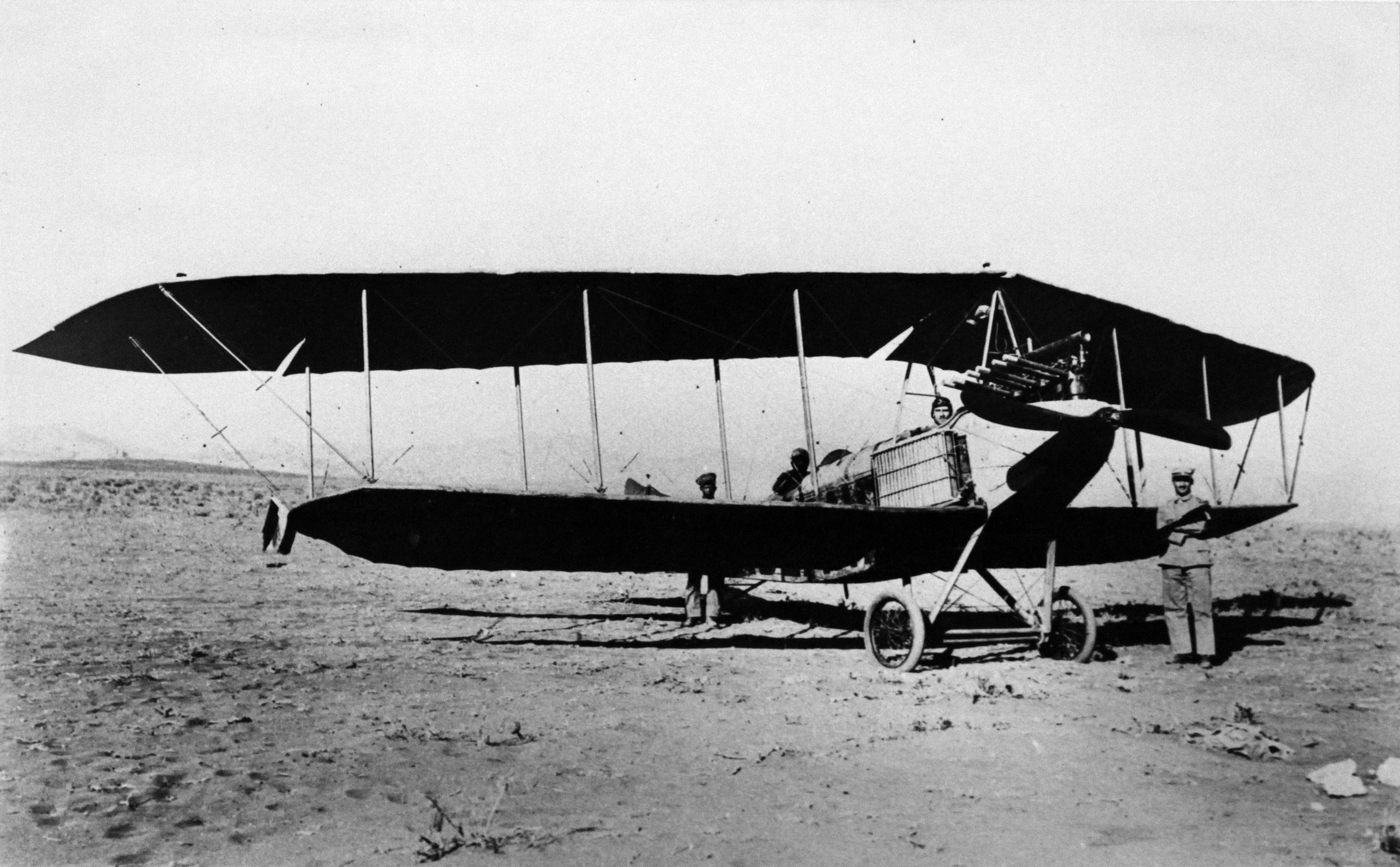
- A Roland Pfeilflieger used by the Schutztruppe in German South-West Africa

General information
- Type: Reconnaissance and bomber aircraft
- National origin: Germany
- Manufacturer: LFG (Luft-Fahrzeug-Gesellschaft), Reinickendorf

History
- First flight: 1914

The LFG Roland Pfeilflieger, (Arrow-flyer), was a German swept wing, single engine, two seat biplane built in Germany in 1914. It made one distinguished long duration flight and served in colonial German South-West Africa.

== Design and development ==
Just before World War I the term Pfeilflieger was used to describe a category of biplanes with swept back wings, a feature adopted to provide some automatic stability. At least six other manufacturers (Ago, DFW, Harlan, Lohner Daimler, Sommer and Union) as well as LFG designed and built them, though some had less sweep than others. Most had Pfeilflieger in their name.

The LFG Arrow was amongst the more strongly swept of the class. It had wings of unequal span, with ailerons only on the overhung upper planes. There was marked dihedral on the lower wing but none on the upper. With three pairs of long interplane struts on each side, the LFG was a three bay biplane with a large interplane gap. It could be powered either by a 100 hp (75 kW) Mercedes D.I water cooled six cylinder inline engine or by a four-cylinder inline Argus As I engine of the same output. The Argus engined version had a span reduced by 0.69 m (2 ft 3 in), 81% of the wing area and a slightly longer fuselage.

The fuselage was flat sided and rectangular in section, with the engine exposed in the nose and the passenger/observer's cockpit immediately behind it. In some engine installations the radiator was mounted along the fuselage side, with this cockpit between them. The pilot's cockpit, fitted like the passenger's with a celluloid windscreen, was much further aft at about mid-fuselage with the main fuel tank between them. Because the LFG had a very broad chord, low aspect ratio horizontal tail of the sort known at the time as "Taube type", he sat not far in front of its leading edge. The tailplane carried an undivided elevator. There was a triangular fin and a high, rounded and balanced rudder. The Arrow had a fixed, conventional undercarriage with V-form struts, their leading members bent round into short skids laterally connected by a rod to which the wheels, on their single axle, were joined via rubber shock absorbers.

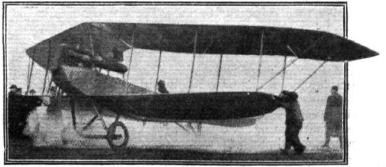
The aircraft that made the 16 hour flight, showing extra tankage behind the engine

== Operational history ==
Before the outbreak of World War I Bernard Langer flew a Roland Pfeilflieger, equipped with a Mercedes engine and extra tankage in place of the passenger, on a non-stop sixteen-hour flight. During the war at least one LFG Roland Pfeilflieger served with the Schutztruppe (Protection Force) in German South-West Africa, now Namibia between 1914 and 1915.

== Variants ==
Mercedes D.I engine
as described
Argus As I engine
span 12.34 m (40 ft 6 in); length 8.08 m (26 ft 6 in); wing area 32.5 m^{2} (350 sq ft)

== Specifications (with Mercedes D.I engine) ==
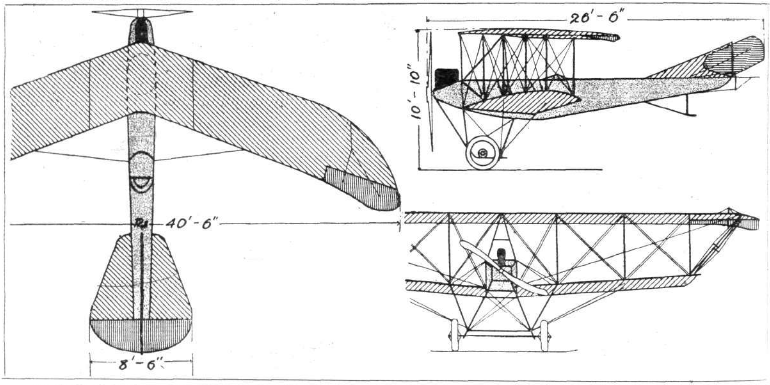
The smaller span, Argus powered Pfeilflieger

Data from Flight 1 August 1914, p.877

General characteristics

- Crew: Two
- Length: 8.00 m (26 ft 3 in)
- Upper wingspan: 12.95 m (42 ft 6 in)
- Height: 3.30 m (10 ft 10 in)
- Wing area: 40 m^{2} (430 sq ft)
- Empty weight: 626 kg (1,380 lb)
- Gross weight: 975 kg (2,150 lb)
- Powerplant: 1 × Mercedes D.I water cooled inline, 75 kW (100 hp)
- Propellers: 2-bladed

Performance

- Maximum speed: 100 km/h (62 mph, 54 kn)
- Combat range: 500 km (310 mi, 270 nmi)
- Endurance: 5 hours with standard tanks

== Bibliography ==
- Herris, Jack (2014). Roland Aircraft of WWI: A Centennial Perspective on Great War Airplanes. Great War Aviation Centennial Series. Vol. 9. Aeronaut Books. ISBN 978-1-935881-20-9.
