= DFW Mars =

Mars
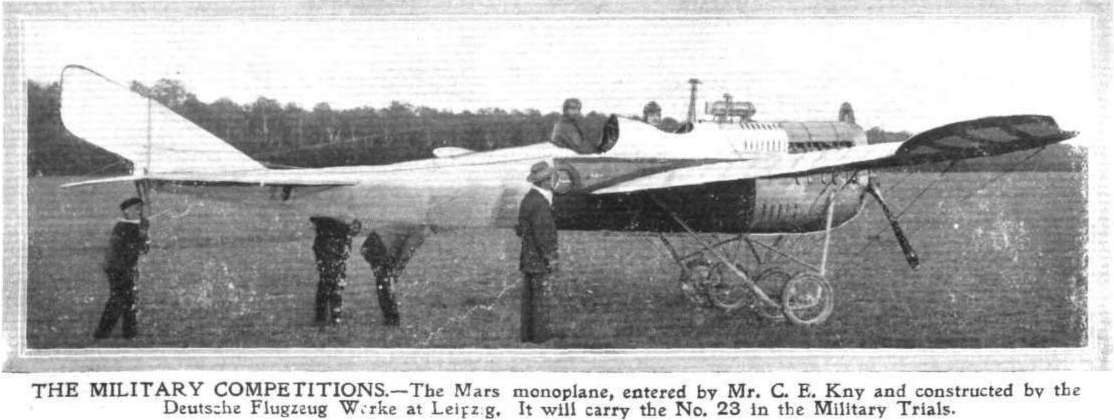
- DFW Mars during military trials in 1913

General information
- Type: Military utility aircraft
- Manufacturer: DFW

History
- First flight: 1913

The DFW Mars was an early German military utility aircraft built in 1913, the first original design manufactured by Deutsche Flugzeug-Werke (DFW). The aircraft was produced in both monoplane and biplane versions, which shared a common fuselage and empennage. The monoplane version featured wings that were wire-braced to a kingpost on the forward fuselage, and was powered by a 71 kW (90 hp) NAG engine. Some of the monoplane used as dedicated trainer aircraft also incorporated a reinforcing truss beneath the wings. The biplane had conventional three-bay wings of unequal span and was powered by a 75 kW (100 hp) Mercedes engine. The wings of both the monoplane and biplane versions featured prominent sweepback.

Mars aircraft were distinguished in pre-war passenger-carrying feats and reliability trials. They were purchased by both the German military and the British Admiralty, which bought an example for the Royal Naval Air Service. Turkish Mars aircraft were flown in the First and Second Balkan Wars in 1912–1913. This type is believed to be the first German-built aircraft utilized for active military service.

== Specifications (biplane) ==
Data from Aeronautics December 1913

General characteristics

- Crew: Two, pilot and observer or instructor
- Length: 9.91 m (32 ft 6 in)
- Upper wingspan: 17 m (56 ft)
- Lower wingspan: 12.04 m (39 ft 6 in)
- Wing area: 46.0 m^{2} (495 sq ft)
- Empty weight: 748 kg (1,650 lb)
- Gross weight: 1,193 kg (2,630 lb)
- Powerplant: 1 × Mercedes D.I 6-cylinder in-line water-cooled piston engine , 83.9 kW (112.5 hp)

Performance

- Maximum speed: 101 km/h (63 mph, 55 kn)
- Time to altitude: 914 m (3,000 ft) in 10 minutes

== Bibliography ==
- Herris, Jack (2017). DFW Aircraft of WWI: A Centennial Perspective on Great War Airplanes. Great War Aviation Centennial Series. Vol. 29. n.p.: Aeronaut Books. ISBN 978-1-935881-54-4.
