= Benz Bz.III =

Bz.III
- Type: 6-cylinder in-line water-cooled piston engine
- National origin: Germany
- Manufacturer: Benz & Cie.
- Developed from: Benz Bz.II
- Developed into: RBVZ-6; Benz Bz.IV

The Benz Bz.III was a six-cylinder, water-cooled, inline engine developed in Germany for use in aircraft in 1914. Developing 112 kW (150 hp) at 1,400 rpm from 14.3 L (875 cu in), it powered many German military aircraft during World War I. It was replaced in production by the unrelated Benz Bz.IIIa. and eventually the V-8 Benz Bz.IIIb. The Benz Bz.III was built under licence in Sweden by AB Thulinverken, known as the Thulin E.

== Applications ==
- AEG C.I
- AEG C.II
- AEG C.III
- AEG C.IV
- AEG G.II
- AGO C.I
- Albatros C.I
- Albatros C.II
- Albatros C.III
- Albatros D.I
- Albatros W.3
- Albatros G.II
- Aviatik C.I
- DFW B.I
- DFW C.I
- DFW C.II
- DFW C.III
- Friedrichshafen FF.33
- Friedrichshafen FF.41
- Friedrichshafen G.I
- Gotha G.I
- Halberstadt D.IV
- Hansa-Brandenburg KDW
- Hansa-Brandenburg W.12
- Hansa-Brandenburg W.29
- Lübeck-Travemünde F.2
- Rumpler C.I
- Rumpler G.I
- Sablatnig SF-5
- Sablatnig SF-8
- Siemens-Schuckert R.I

== Specifications ==
Data from

=== General characteristics ===
- Type: Six-cylinder, inline piston engine
- Bore: 130 mm (5.118 in)
- Stroke: 180 mm (7.087 in)
- Displacement: 14.3 L (873 cu in)
- Dry weight: 270 kg (595 lb)

=== Components ===
- Valvetrain: One camshaft in the engine block, driving one inlet and one exhaust valve per cylinder via pushrods and rocker arms (overhead valve).
- Cooling system: Water-cooled

=== Performance ===
- Power output: 112 kW (150 hp) at 1,400 rpm
- Specific power: 8.4 kW/L
- Compression ratio: 4.7
- Specific fuel consumption: 310 g/kWh

== See also ==
Related lists

- List of aircraft engines

== Bibliography ==
- Gunston, Bill (1986). World Encyclopedia of Aero Engines. Wellingborough: Patrick Stephens. pp. 22–23.
- Kyrill von Gersdorff, Kurt Grasmann. Flugmotoren und Strahltriebwerke, Bernard & Graefe Verlag, 1981, ISBN 3-7637-5272-2
- Smith, Herschel. Aircraft Piston Engines. New York: McGraw-Hill, 1981. ISBN 0-07-058472-9.
