= Friedrichshafen FF.35 =

1916 German floatplane torpedo bomber

FF.35
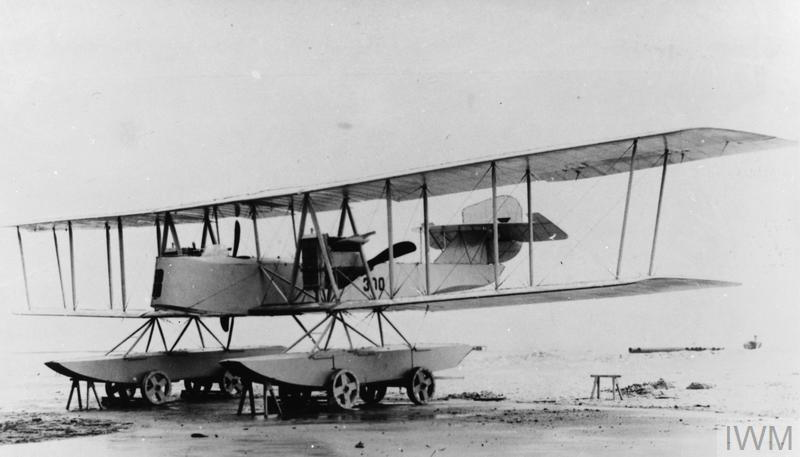
- The FF.35 with axles installed underneath its floats

General information
- Type: Floatplane torpedo bomber
- Manufacturer: Flugzeugbau Friedrichshafen
- Primary user: Imperial German Navy
- Number built: 1

History
- First flight: 1916
- Developed into: Friedrichshafen FF.41

The Friedrichshafen FF.35 was a German three-seat floatplane torpedo bomber built during World War I by Friedrichshafen Flugzeugbau for the Imperial German Navy's (Kaiserliche Marine) Naval Air Service (Marine-Fliegerabteilung). Only one prototype was constructed in 1916 and it saw limited operational use during the war in Courland.

== Development ==
After the submarine SM U-9 sank three British armored cruisers on 22 September 1914 shortly after the war began, the German Imperial Naval Office (Reichsmarine-Amt) decided to try mounting torpedoes on aircraft as they were far easier and faster to build than submarines. Early trials with land-based aircraft were unsuccessful because of the great weight of the torpedo (645 kilograms (1,422 lb)) was more than existing aircraft could easily lift and the danger of trying to fly from an uneven grass airstrip with such a large weight of explosives. At the beginning of 1915 the Naval Office ordered the development of seaplanes capable of carrying torpedoes and the Seaplane Experimental Command (Seeflugzeug-Versuchs-Kommando (SVK)) issued requirements for these aircraft. They had to be twin-engine airplanes armed with a machine gun for self-defense and with a crew of two or three men: a pilot and observer for torpedo missions and a pilot, bombardier and gunner for bombing missions.

Friedrichshafen's submission was similar in general design to their G.I bomber and the FF.35 was a conventional four-bay biplane with unstaggered, unequal-span wings. The undercarriage consisted of two widely spaced floats to allow for the torpedo to be carried between them. The floats were attached to the fuselage by multiple V-struts. The horizontal stabiliser was mounted halfway up the vertical stabilizer to keep it clear of spray while taxiing. The 160-metric-horsepower (118 kW) Mercedes D.III straight-six engines were positioned between the wings in pusher configuration with the two-blade propellers behind the engines and the radiators at the front. The engines were supported by a pair of struts in an inverted V configuration.

The torpedoes used by the FF.35 and other German torpedo bombers were not designed for aerial use and had very narrow parameters for a successful launch, namely that the aircraft had to be flying straight and level and at an altitude of no more than 10 meters (33 ft). To give pilots a method by which all of these conditions could be judged, the aircraft were fitted with an Anschütz gyroscopic inclinometer to assess their flight attitude. Their height above water was measured by a 10-meter weighed steel cable that triggered a light in the cockpit when it touched the water, completing an electrical circuit.

== Operational history ==
The SVK placed an order for one prototype in February 1915, (Note: Aviation historian Siegfried Borzutzki claims that the aircraft was ordered on 24 March.) but construction was significantly delayed by Friedrichshafen's existing commitments and did not begin until 2 February 1916. It was delivered to the SVK in May for testing which was completed on 24 May and the aircraft received the serial number (Marine-nummer) 300. (Note: Some sources say that another aircraft was built with Marine-nummer 310, but aviation historian Jack Herris states that SVK records show that the entire block of 301–400 numbers was never used.) The performance of the FF.35 was deemed satisfactory, but it was structurally obsolete by the time it was delivered. Although no further examples were built, the FF.35 formed the basis for the more successful and streamlined FF.41.

The Naval Air Service began flying bombing missions with the FF.35 from the Naval Air Station (Seeflugstation) at Engure, Latvia, (Angern, Courland) on the western shore of the Gulf of Riga before the end of May. The floatplane also was extensively used by the SVK for trials; the last reference to it is from September when it was noted as being equipped with a radio and a machine gun.

== Specifications ==
Data from Flugzeugbau Friedrichshafen GmbH: Diplom-Ingenieur Theodor Kober; Friedrichshafen Aircraft of WWI: A Centennial Perspective on Great War Airplanes

General characteristics

- Crew: 3
- Length: 13.5 m (44 ft 3 in)
- Upper wingspan: 23.74 m (77 ft 11 in)
- Lower wingspan: 21.02 m (69 ft 0 in)
- Height: 4.5 m (14 ft 9 in)
- Wing area: 100 m^{2} (1,100 sq ft)
- Empty weight: 2,292 kg (5,053 lb)
- Gross weight: 3,543 kg (7,811 lb)
- Powerplant: 2 × Mercedes D.III water-cooled straight-six engines, 120 kW (160 hp) Originally measured as 160 PS each
- Propellers: 2-bladed pusher propellers

Performance

- Maximum speed: 114 km/h (71 mph, 62 kn)
- Range: 770 km (480 mi, 420 nmi)

Armament

- Guns: 1 or 2 × 7.92 mm (0.312 in) Parabellum MG14 machine-guns
- Bombs: 1 × 726 kg (1,601 lb) torpedo

== See also ==
Related development

- Friedrichshafen FF.41

Aircraft of comparable role, configuration, and era

- Hansa-Brandenburg GW
- Gotha WD.7
- Albatros W.3

Related lists

- List of military aircraft of Germany
- List of flying boats and floatplanes

== Bibliography ==
- Borzutzki, Siegfried (1993). Flugzeugbau Friedrichshafen GmbH: Diplom-Ingenieur Theodor Kober [Friedrichshafen Aircraft Company: Diploma-Engineer Theodore Kober] (in German). Burbach. ISBN 3-927513-60-1.
- Herris, Jack (2016). Friedrichshafen Aircraft of WWI: A Centennial Perspective on Great War Airplanes. Great War Aviation Centennial Series. Vol. 21. Aeronaut Books. ISBN 978-1-935881-35-3.
- Schmeelke, Michael (2020). "Torpedo Los!": The German Imperial Torpedo-Flieger. Aeronaut Books. ISBN 978-1-953201-17-1.
