= Kurt Herrmann =

German publisher and businessman

Prussian State Councilor
- In office 20 May 1938 – 8 May 1945

Personal details
- Born: 20 May 1888 Leipzig, Kingdom of Saxony, German Empire
- Died: 4 November 1959 (aged 71) Vaduz, Liechtenstein
- Citizenship: German; Liechtensteiner
- Education: Royal Saxon Building Trades School
- Occupation: Business executive
- Profession: Architect
- Known for: Aryanization
- Awards: War Merit Cross, without Swords

Kurt Herrmann (20 May 1888 – 4 November 1959) was a German architect, publisher and industrialist. Under Nazi Germany he prospered by the Aryanization and expropriation of Jewish businesses. Toward the end of World War II in Europe, he fled to Liechtenstein. Denazification proceedings resulted in no punishment, and he lived as an expatriate in Vaduz with access to considerable wealth from his Swiss bank accounts. However, in the Soviet occupation zone of Germany, he was sentenced to death in absentia and his assets there were confiscated. After the fall of the East German regime, his heirs sought to recover the properties but their legal claims were denied.

== Early life ==
Herrmann was born in Leipzig, the son of a master craftsman, and completed an apprenticeship as a bricklayer from 1902 to 1905. He then studied at the Königlich-Sächsische Baugewerkenschule Leipzig (Royal Saxon Building Trades School, Leipzig) until 1908, earning a Diplom in engineering and becoming a state-certified master builder. He was then employed as a construction manager in the Leipzig municipal building administration until July 1912 when he set up shop as a self-employed architect. Herrmann designed a new building for the Leipzig publisher and print shop owner Bernhard Meyer in 1913, and he married Meyer's daughter Erna Agnes in 1914. In 1911, Meyer also had founded the Deutsche Flugzeug-Werke (DFW) aircraft manufacturing company in Lindenthal, a suburb of Leipzig. When Meyer died in April 1917, Herrmann inherited considerable industrial assets, becoming general director of DFW and director of the publishing house.

== Expansion of business interests ==
After the end of the First World War, the terms of the Treaty of Versailles banned a German air force and many aircraft factories went out of business. By 1920, Herrmann founded the Allgemeine Transportanlagen-Gesellschaft by converting a DFW plant in Leipzig to produce electric monorails, cable cars, cable cranes and conveyor bridge machinery for lignite mining. The mining equipment operation proved especially successful and eventually was sold to the mining conglomerate headed by Friedrich Flick in May 1933. During the 1920s, Herrmann also founded financial companies in Switzerland and Liechtenstein. The Technische Universität Dresden appointed him an honorary senator in 1927. By 1931, Herrmann's magazine publishing empire employed 12,000 people. In October 1931, he took up residence in Eschen in Liechtenstein and applied for citizenship, which was granted. However, he hid his Liechtenstein citizenship from the German authorities. In 1937, Herrmann formed the Universalverlag publishing company by a merger of his company, Bernhard Meyer of Leipzig, with Willy Vobach & Co., also of Leipzig, and the Curt Hamel company of Berlin. By 1939, Universalverlag published 25 magazines with 4.6 million subscribers. In 1938, Hermann purchased the Braunschweigische Lebensversicherungsbank (Braunschweig Life insurance Bank).

== Career in Nazi Germany ==
=== Relationship with top Nazis and professional advancement ===
After the Nazi seizure of power, Herrmann, though never formally joining the Nazi Party, developed close personal contacts with leading Nazis. He became a trusted protégé of Hermann Göring, went hunting with him and was a guest at his 10 April 1935 wedding to Emmy Sonnemann. He regularly made generous monetary gifts in amounts up to 50,000 ℛℳ to Göring, Adolf Hitler and Joseph Goebbels. His connections with them proved advantageous when he and his family encountered legal difficulties, as the following examples illustrate:

- Hermann's 18-year-old son Heinz had been arrested in Berlin on 6 January 1933 as an accomplice to a robbery and was sentenced to eight months in prison on 7 March. Herrmann was able to use his connections to obtain his son's release on 13 April in return for the payment of 50,000 ℛℳ. In January 1934, the sentence was formally suspended and the conviction was expunged from the criminal record a year later. Herrmann wrote a letter of thanks to Roland Freisler, then the State Secretary in the Reich Ministry of Justice and later to become president of the People's Court.
- On the orders of the Leipzig tax office, Herrmann was arrested on 11 September 1936 on suspicion of tax evasion. Herrmann appealed to Göring's State Secretary Paul Körner. Göring secured a dismissal of the charges on 13 September and, instead, had the responsible tax investigator arrested, after which Herrmann telegraphed: "To you, esteemed Colonel General, my immeasurable thanks and deepest devotion".

In 1936, Herrmann was appointed to the Reichsjagdrat (Reich Hunting Council) and also was admitted to both the Reich Chamber of Fine Arts and the Reich Press Chamber in the Reich Chamber of Culture, which was headed by Goebbels. On the occasion of Hermann's fiftieth birthday on 20 May 1938, Prussian Minister president Göring appointed him to the Prussian State Council, an advisory body that, in addition to Party officials and politicians, included representatives of churches, business, labor, science and the arts.

=== Aryanization ===
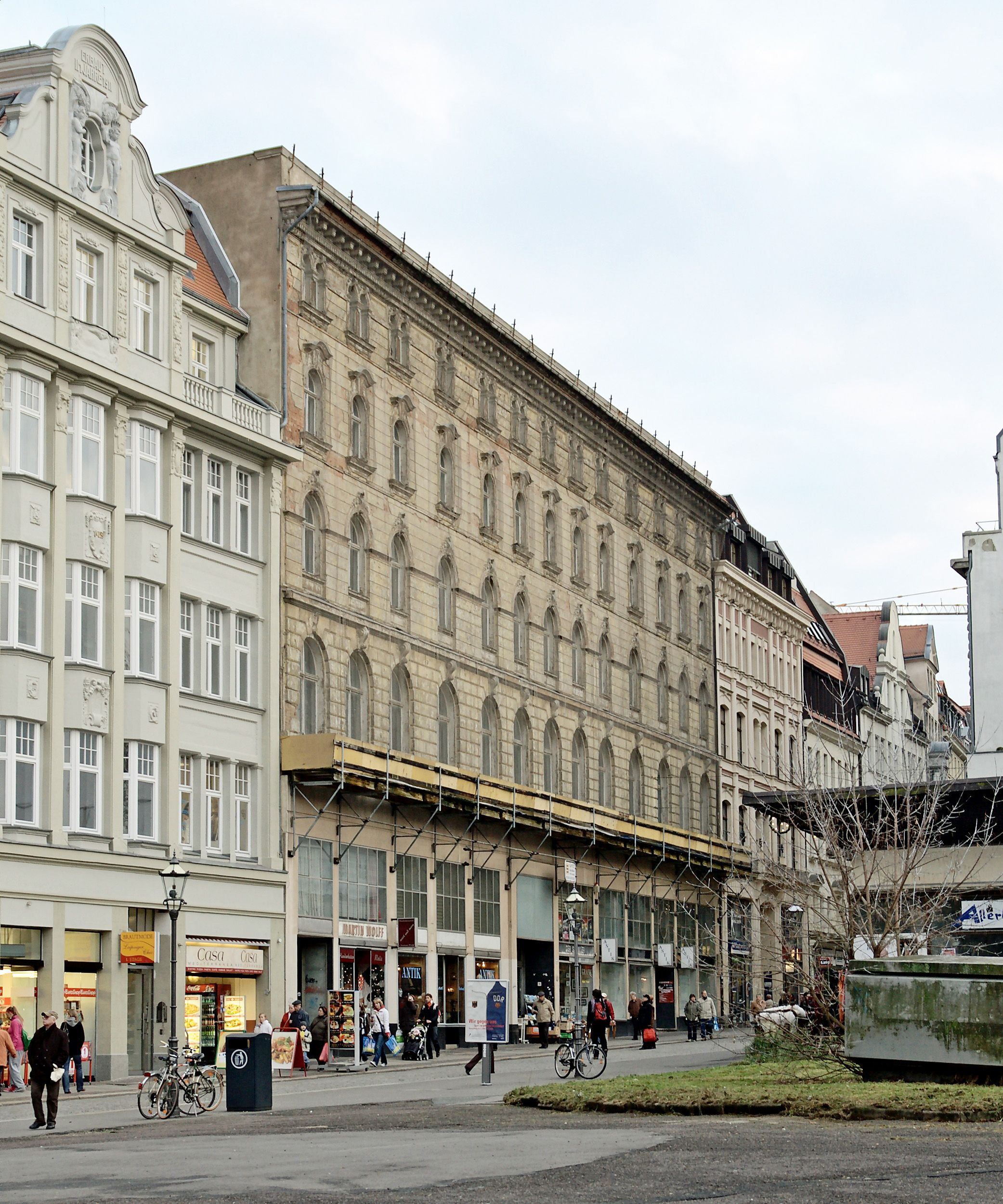
Hôtel de Pologne in Leipzig, which Herrmann obtained from its former Jewish owners via Aryanization

Herrmann participated in, and greatly profited from, the process of Aryanization of Jewish companies. In 1938, Herrmann took ownership of the Jewish-owned Berlin jewelry company Gebrüder Friedländer (Friedländer Brothers) that had been jewelers to the Prussian royal court. He renamed it the Deutsche Goldschmiedekunst-Werkstätten (German Goldsmiths' Art Workshops). Through this venture, he had the opportunity to purchase jewelry that had been confiscated by the Nazis at prices far below their market value. The venerable music publishing house C.F. Peters in Leipzig also fell victim to this process in July 1939. The new shareholders became Herrmann, who financed the takeover, and Johannes Petschull (1901–2001), who took over the management. Herrmann owned a large number of properties in Leipzig, including the former Hôtel de Pologne, and several manor houses in Saxony and Mecklenburg. With assets estimated to be around 9 million ℛℳ in bank deposits and around 14 million ℛℳ in securities, he was considered one of the wealthiest residents of Leipzig.

=== "The Reichsmarshall's jeweler" ===
During the war years, Herrmann often traveled to the occupied countries of France and The Netherlands on Reichsmarshall Goring's behalf to obtain jewels and other treasures and artworks at less than market value. In The Netherlands, he acted as Göring's Sonderbeauftragter (special representative) for diamond purchases. Post-war investigations by Dutch officials concluded that Hermann participated in the transfer of considerable lots of diamonds taken under duress from Dutch jewelers during the occupation. In 1942, his German Goldsmiths' Art Workshops was allowed to purchase, at below market value, jewels that had been looted by the Nazis from the Rothschild family collection in France. During the course of the war, Herrmann was awarded the War Merit Cross.

== Post-war years ==
In the closing days of the war in Europe, Herrmann left Leipzig and traveled via Austria to Liechtenstein, where he arrived on 30 April 1945. In interviews with government authorities, he claimed not only that he had been a citizen of Liechtenstein since 1931 but that he had given up his German citizenship. He professed his opposition to the Nazi regime and claimed that he had been "persecuted" by them. He even claimed to have helped finance the 20 July plot on Hitler's life. The authorities in the Soviet occupation zone sentenced him to death in absentia as a war criminal and his assets there were expropriated in 1948. However, in Liechtenstein he retained access to his assets that were safeguarded in Swiss bank accounts. Denazification proceedings held in Hanover in 1950 classified him in category 4 (follower) and issued no punishment. He continued to live comfortably as an expatriate in Vaduz until his death in 1959.

== Legal dispute over Herrmann's assets ==
Following the fall of the Communist regime of East Germany, Ursula Herrmann, the wife of Herrmann's deceased son Heinz, and also a resident of Lichtenstein, claimed to be the sole heir to the 40 to 50 properties formerly owned by her deceased father-in-law. Leipzig rejected her request for return of the Hôtel de Pologne property, which was valued at 11 million DM. The heiress then filed a lawsuit against the city, which alleged that Kurt Herrmann had been a citizen of Liechtenstein since 1931 and, as such, his assets were protected from expropriation. The court rejected this argument and denied the case in 1994. An appeal was filed with the Federal Administrative Court, and the case was reheard. At the end of 1998, the court upheld the original denial. A final appeal was then submitted to the Federal Constitutional Court, which decided not to accept the case for review.

== Sources ==
- Broder, Henryk M. (16 February 1997). "Diamanten für den Reichsmarschall". Der Spiegel online (in German). pp. 44–58.
- Hanspeter Lussy: Kurt Herrmann in the Lichstenstein Historical Lexicon
- Lilla, Joachim (2005). Der Preußische Staatsrat 1921–1933: Ein biographisches Handbuch. Düsseldorf: Droste Verlag. ISBN 978-3-770-05271-4.
