= AEG C.III =

German prototype reconnaissance biplane

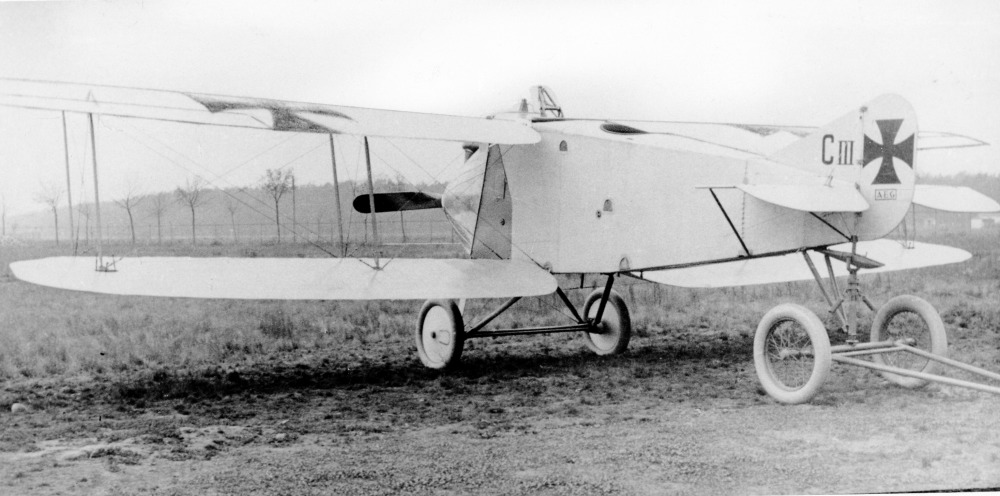

General information
- Type: Reconnaissance aircraft
- Manufacturer: AEG
- Primary user: Luftstreitkräfte
- Number built: 1–2

History
- First flight: December 1915

The AEG C.III was a prototype two-seat biplane reconnaissance aircraft built by the Allgemeine Elektricitäts-Gesellschaft (AEG) during the First World War for the Imperial German Army's (Deutsches Heer) Imperial German Air Service (Luftstreitkräfte). It was derived from the C.II, but with a new fuselage that completely filled the gap between the wings. The upper wing was at the top of the fuselage to give the observer in the front cockpit the best possible field of fire. One or two prototypes were ordered in late 1915, but the C.III never entered into service.

== Development ==
The aircraft featured an unusual fuselage design derived from the C.II that was inspired by that of the Roland C.II where the fuselage filled the gap between the two-bay wings; the upper wing was attached to the fuselage's upper longerons and the lower wing to the lower longerons. The fuselage design was also intended to reduce drag by eliminating the cabane struts that commonly attached the upper wing to the fuselage. This configuration gave the observer the best visibility possible for his 7.92 mm (.312 in) machine gun because his position in front of the pilot was above the upper wing. The observer could not shoot through the propeller because the C.III did not have interruptor gear installed. It used the same water-cooled 150-horsepower (110 kW) Benz Bz.III straight-six piston engine as the C.II.

The first prototype made its first flight in December 1915 and flight testing revealed that the space between the wings was too small and caused interference with the airflow between them. This limited the C.III's performance and impaired its flying qualities. Further development was abandoned.

== Specifications (AEG C.III) ==
Data from German Aircraft of the First World War; A.E.G. Aircraft of WWI: A Centennial Perspective on Great War Airplanes

General characteristics

- Crew: 2
- Length: 6.5 m (21 ft 4 in)
- Upper wingspan: 13 m (42 ft 8 in)
- Lower wingspan: 12.5 m (41 ft 0 in)
- Wing area: 33.9 m^{2} (365 sq ft)
- Empty weight: 687 kg (1,515 lb)
- Gross weight: 1,232 kg (2,716 lb)
- Powerplant: 1 × Benz Bz.III water-cooled, straight-six piston engine, 110 kW (150 hp)
- Propellers: 2-bladed

Performance

- Maximum speed: 145 km/h (90 mph, 78 kn)

Armament

- Guns: 1 × 7.92 mm (.312 in) machine gun on a flexible mount for the observer

== See also ==
Related lists

- List of military aircraft of Germany

== Bibliography ==
- Gray, Peter & Thetford, Owen (1987) [1970]. German Aircraft of the First World War (2nd ed.). London: Putnam. ISBN 0-85177-809-7.
- Herris, Jack (2015). A.E.G. Aircraft of WWI: A Centennial Perspective on Great War Airplanes. Great War Aviation Centennial Series. Vol. 16. n. p.: Aeronaut Books. ISBN 978-1-935881-28-5.
