= Stahlwerk-Mark R.V =

R.V
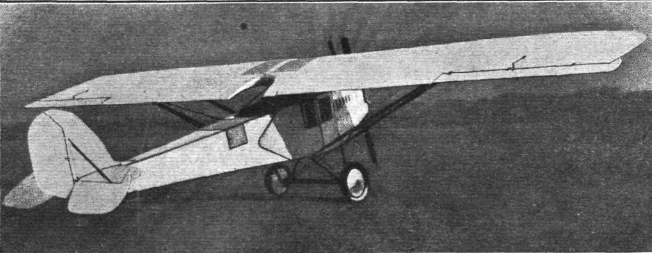

General information
- Type: Small airliner
- National origin: Germany
- Manufacturer: Stahlwerk-Mark
- Designer: Rieseler brothers
- Number built: 2

History
- First flight: 1923

The Stahlwerk-Mark R.V, sometimes known as the Stahlwerk-Mark R.V/23 to indicate its year of production, was a small German airliner able to carry three passengers. Two were built.

== Design and development ==
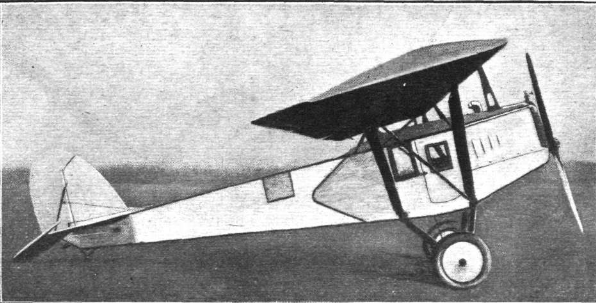

The R.V was the Rieseler brother's first multiple passenger aircraft, a single engine parasol wing cabin design. The wing was in two parts, each with two wooden spars and ribs. Though the wings had quite thick, high lift airfoil sections, they were not cantilever structures and wing loads were transmitted to the fuselage via N form struts from the lower fuselage longerons to the wing spars, their outer, parallel members enclosed in fairings. A shallow steel tube cabane connected and supported the wings over the fuselage. They were fitted with high aspect ratio overhung balanced ailerons and had a deep cut-out in the trailing edge over the cockpit to enhance the pilot's forward and upward vision.

The clean fuselage of the R.V was an internally wire braced, welded steel tube structure of rectangular cross section. The 100 hp (75 kW) Mercedes D.I water-cooled six cylinder inline engine was mounted behind a rectangular nose radiator in an aluminium covered forward fuselage region; fuel was gravity fed from a wing tank. Aft, the fuselage was fabric covered. The pilot had an open cockpit under the wing trailing edge, with one passenger next to him. Two other passengers could sit, though not stand, side by side within the fuselage forward of the pilot in a cabin lit by windows, one in the small, starboard side door, and heated by hot air from the engine. Their luggage was placed in a small compartment behind the pilot. The empennage was a steel tube structure, fabric covered. The braced tailplane carried separate elevators which, like the rudder, were balanced. The R.V had a simple, fixed conventional undercarriage with steel tube V struts and mainwheels on a rubber sprung single axle, together with a tailskid.

The R.V was flying before mid-January 1924. There were plans to accommodate all three passengers in the cabin. By February, their test pilot Raab had expressed strong concerns about the pilot's position, particularly the lack of visibility and his exposure to wind and pitching motions, suggesting that the relative positions of cockpit and cabin needed altering. This advice was heeded and in the second aircraft the cockpit had been moved forward, the cut-out in the trailing edge removed and the cabin placed under the trailing edge. In addition, the ailerons were no longer overhung and the vertical tail was broader and less high. This machine had a Daimler engine.

== Specifications ==
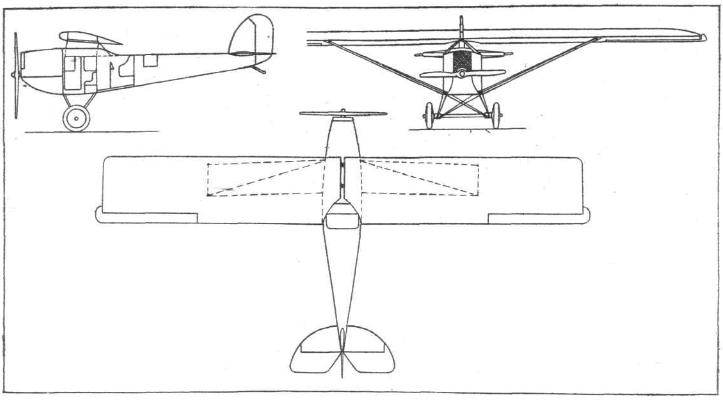

Data from The Stahlwerk-Mark R.V/23 Commercial Monoplane

General characteristics

- Crew: One
- Capacity: Three passengers
- Length: 7.9 m (25 ft 11 in)
- Wingspan: 14.25 m (46 ft 9 in)
- Height: 3.35 m (11 ft 0 in)
- Wing area: 27 m^{2} (290 sq ft)
- Aspect ratio: 7.52
- Empty weight: 800 kg (1,764 lb)
- Gross weight: 1,280 kg (2,822 lb)
- Powerplant: 1 × Mercedes D.I 6-cylinder water-cooled inline, 75 kW (100 hp)
- Propellers: 2-bladed

Performance

- Maximum speed: 150 km/h (93 mph, 81 kn)
- Range: 370 km (230 mi, 200 nmi)
- Endurance: 4 hr at full speed
- Time to altitude: 8 min to 1,000 m (3,280 ft)
- Wing loading: 47 kg/m^{2} (9.7 lb/sq ft)
- Power/mass: 58 W/kg (0.035 hp/lb)
