= Friedrichshafen FF.41 =

FF.41a
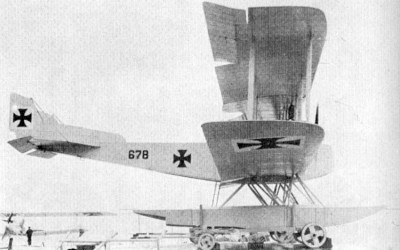

General information
- Type: Reconnaissance
- Manufacturer: Flugzeugbau Friedrichshafen GmbH
- Primary users: Kaiserliche Marine Finnish Air Force; Estonian Air Force
- Number built: 9 (1 x FF.41a + 8 x FF.41at)

History
- Introduction date: 1917
- First flight: 1917

The Friedrichshafen FF.41a was a large, German-built, three-seat, twin-engine floatplane reconnaissance aircraft designed by Flugzeugbau Friedrichshafen in 1917.

The aircraft was mainly used as a reconnaissance aircraft, but also as a bomber and as a mine-laying aircraft. A torpedo-carrying version, the FF.41at, was also developed. It had a modified fuselage and a single vertical fin (in comparison to the basic model's three). Only five FF.41at aircraft were manufactured. According to another information, eight FF.41 were built, and six of them were stationed in the Baltic territories. Aircraft numbered 996, 1000 and 1209 were stationed In Vindava (Ventspils), and aircraft numbered 997, 998 and 999 in Angersee.

== Use in Finland ==
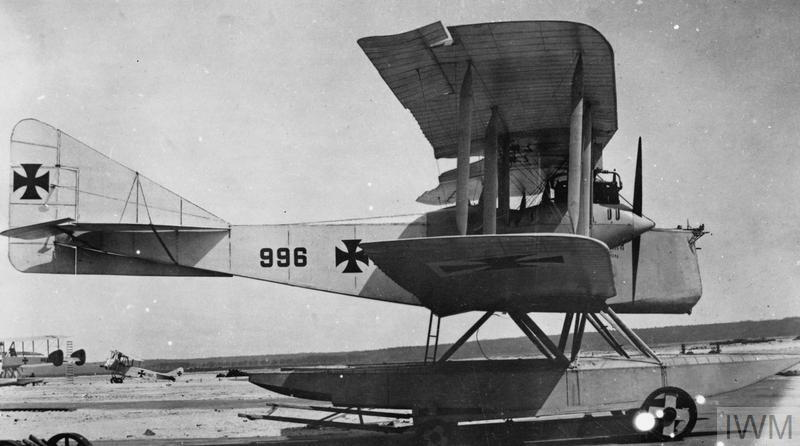
A side view of a FF.41AT torpedo bomber

The Finnish Air Force purchased one FF.41at aircraft from the Germans in Estonia on 26 November 1918, at the end of World War I. It was flown to Sortavala where it was repaired. In 1922, the torpedo-carrying fuselage was changed, and the capability to carry torpedoes was removed. This aircraft was in use between 1918–23.

== Use in Estonia ==
The Estonians found an unairworthy Friedrichshafen FF.41a in the Tallinn hangars. The remains of the wrecked German aeroplane were used to produce the first aeroplane of the independent Estonian Air Force. On 13 March 1919, the Naval Squad was established, and the barrack finished in 1921. According to the other information the Estonians were left three aircraft. One of them was purchased by the Finns, and the other two in bad conditions were re-built as a new functioning one, which stayed in Estonian service.

== Variants ==
FF.41a
A twin engined floatplane torpedo bomber, developed from the FF.35; one built.
FF.41at
Further developed torpedo bomber floatplane; eight built.

== Operators ==
Estonia
Estonian Air Force
Finland
Finnish Air Force
German Empire
German Imperial Navy

== Specifications (FF.41at) ==
Data from Flugzeugbau Friedrichshafen GmbH, Thulinista Hornetiin – 75 vuotta Suomen ilmavoimien lentokoneita

General characteristics

- Crew: 2
- Length: 13.7 m (44 ft 11 in)
- Upper wingspan: 22 m (72 ft 2 in)
- Lower wingspan: 20.97 m (68 ft 10 in)
- Height: 4.65 m (15 ft 3 in)
- Wing area: 112.5 m^{2} (1,211 sq ft)
- Empty weight: 2,288 kg (5,044 lb)
- Gross weight: 3,701 kg (8,159 lb)
- Powerplant: 2 × Benz Bz.III 6-cylinder water-cooled in-line piston engines, 110 kW (150 hp) each
- Propellers: 2-bladed fixed pitch tractor propellers

Performance

- Maximum speed: 125 km/h (78 mph, 67 kn)
- Cruise speed: 115 km/h (71 mph, 62 kn)
- Range: 605 km (376 mi, 327 nmi)
- Endurance: 6 hours
- Time to altitude:

560 m (1,840 ft) in 9 minutes
800 m (2,600 ft) in 16 to 18 minutes
1,000 m (3,300 ft) in 20-25 minutes

Armament

- Guns: 1 × 7.92 mm (0.312 in) Parabellum MG14 machine-gun
- Bombs: 1 × 726 kg (1,601 lb) torpedo

== See also ==
Related lists

- List of military aircraft of Finland
- List of military aircraft of Germany
- List of flying boats and floatplanes

== Bibliography ==
- Borzutzki, Siegfried (1993). Flugzeugbau Friedrichshafen GmbH: Diplom-Ingenieur Theodor Kober [Friedrichshafen Aircraft Company: Diloma-Engineer Theodore Kober] (in German). Berlin: Burbach. ISBN 3-927513-60-1.
- Gerdessen, Frederik. "Estonian Air Power 1918 – 1945". Air Enthusiast, No. 18, April – July 1982. pp. 61–76. ISSN 0143-5450.
- Herris, Jack (2016). Friedrichshafen Aircraft of WWI: A Centennial Perspective on Great War Airplanes. Great War Aviation Centennial Series. Vol. 21. Charleston, South Carolina: Aeronaut Books. ISBN 978-1-935881-35-3.
- Schmeelke, Michael (2020). "Torpedo Los!": The German Imperial Torpedo-Flieger. n.p.: Aeronaut Books. ISBN 978-1-953201-17-1.
