= AEG B.III =

B.III

General information
- Type: Reconnaissance aircraft
- Manufacturer: AEG

History
- Introduction date: 1915
- First flight: 1915

The AEG B.III was a German two-seat biplane reconnaissance aircraft produced in very small numbers from 1915. It was a further refinement of the B.I and B.II, with a fresh tailplane assembly, but was still only just adequate in performance and did not attract much interest. The B.III was put into reconnaissance and training roles in 1915, but was soon replaced by armed aircraft in the German military.

== Specifications (AEG B.III) ==
Data from The Virtual Aviation Museum

General characteristics

- Crew: 2
- Length: 7.9 m (25 ft 11 in)
- Wingspan: 13.1 m (43 ft 0 in)
- Wing area: 41 m^{2} (440 sq ft)
- Powerplant: 1 × Mercedes D.II 6-cyl. water-cooled in-line piston engine, 88 kW (118 hp)

Performance

- Maximum speed: 110 km/h (68 mph, 59 kn)

== See also ==
- Aerial reconnaissance
- Surveillance aircraft

== Bibliography ==
- Herris, Jack (2015). A.E.G. Aircraft of WWI: A Centennial Perspective on Great War Airplanes. Great War Aviation Centennial Series. Vol. 16. n. p.: Aeronaut Books. ISBN 978-1-935881-28-5.
