= DFW C.III =

German reconnaissance aircraft

C.III

General information
- Type: Reconnaissance aircraft
- Manufacturer: DFW

The DFW C.III was a German reconnaissance aircraft produced during World War I.

Powered by a 150 hp (110 kW) Benz Bz.III, the DFW C.III was designed as a pusher biplane, and resembled the pusher aircraft built by Breguet. However, the C.III remained a prototype only.

== Bibliography ==
- Herris, Jack (2017). DFW Aircraft of WWI: A Centennial Perspective on Great War Airplanes. Great War Aviation Centennial Series. Vol. 29. n.p.: Aeronaut Books. ISBN 978-1-935881-54-4.
