= Bernhard Meyer (publisher) =

German publisher and aviation industrialist

- Born: Bernhard Meyer; October 5, 1860; Fraureuth, Kingdom of Saxony
- Died: April 19, 1917 (aged 56); Leipzig, Germany
- Occupation: Publisher
- Relatives: Kurt Herrmann (son-in-law)

Bernhard Meyer (5 October 1860 in Fraureuth, Kingdom of Saxony – 19 April 1917 in Leipzig) was a German publisher and motor- and aviation-industrialist in the late 19th and early 20th centuries. He is notable for being the first publisher in Germany to successfully combine a magazine subscription with an accident insurance in 1899. Later in his life he invested in the early German motor- and aviation-industry and, most notably, together with Erich Thiele founded the Deutsche Flugzeug-Werke (DFW). Upon his death, his publishing and aviation businesses were inherited and managed by his son-in-law, Kurt Herrmann.

== Verlag Bernhard Meyer and "Nach Feierabend" ==
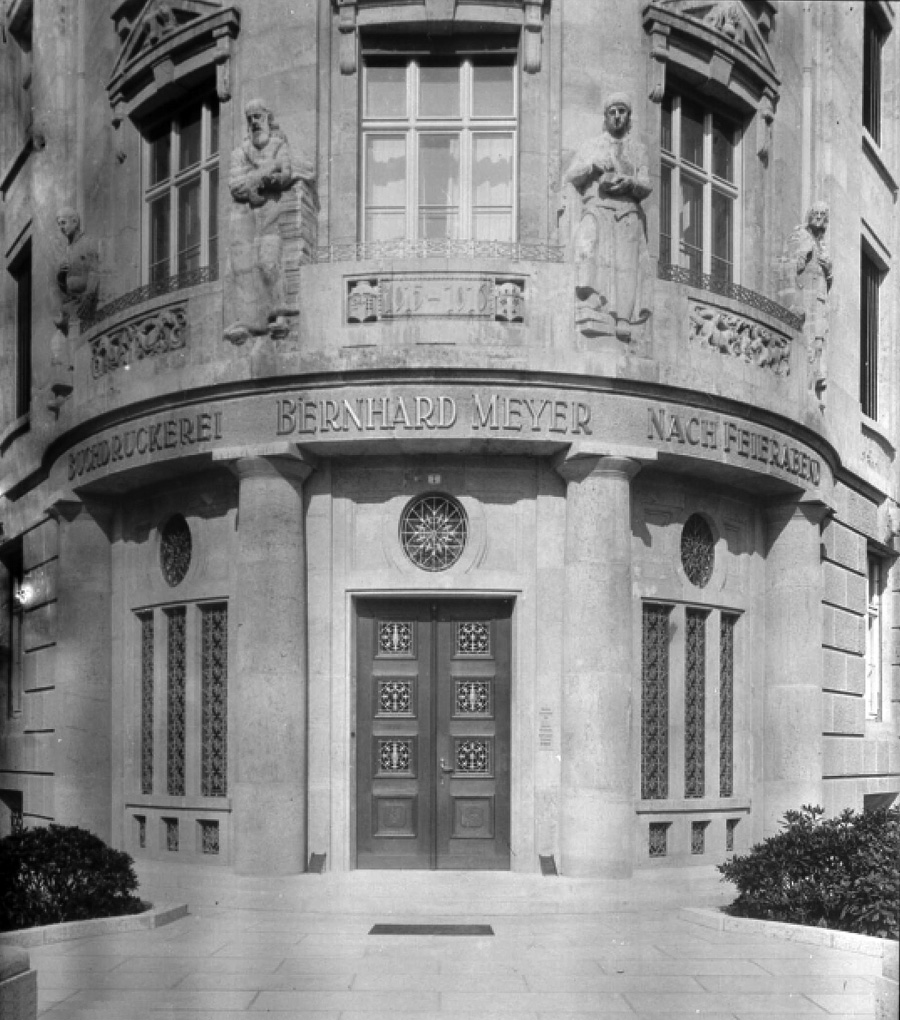
Entrance of Bernhard Meyer's printing house Buchdruckerei Bernhard Meyer in Leipzig

Bernhard Meyer had established his publishing house Verlag Bernhard Meyer in Leipzig. His major success came in 1899, when he partnered with the Nürnberger Lebensversicherung insurance company to combine the subscription of his new magazine Nach Feierabend with an accident insurance. This magazine subscription model with insurance was aimed to bind the subscribers, while at the same time efficiently using the publishers distribution channels for the insurance sales. In 1906 the insurance was extended with an additional funeral costs insurance. By 1905 the magazine had already 400,000 and in 1912 even 900,000 subscriptions and it reached one million subscriptions by 1914. For 1917 about 1,250,000 subscribers were mentioned.

== Deutsche Flugzeug-Werke and other investments ==
In 1910 he founded with Erich Thiele the Deutsche Flugzeug-Werke (DFW) which became a major aircraft manufacturer in Germany in the First World War.

He also partnered with Robert Conrad (Zivilingenieur Robert Conrad und Kommerzienrat Bernh. Meyer) for the construction of two aircraft engines for the Kaiserpreis aircraft engine contest which was held in 1912/13. Despite one of these engines not being ready in time and the other one being damaged on the transport and therefore not being tested in the contest, the cooperation resulted in the foundation of the Deutsche Motorenbau-Gesellschaft with Robert Conrad in Berlin-Marienfelde, at which later the Conrad C.III aircraft engine was developed.

In June 1914 he also founded the Flugzeugwerft Lübeck-Travemünde and on 15 June 1915 he acquired the National-Flugzeugwerke (NFW) (former Jeannin-Flugzeugbau Johannisthal) and integrated it as subsidiary company into the Deutsche Flugzeug-Werke (DFW). Further investments mentioned were the Markranstädter Automobilfabrik Hugo Ruppe (MAF), the Kleinmotoren Bau-Gesellschaft in Leipzig and the Leipziger Geschoßdreherei.
