= Albatros C.VII =

German reconnaissance aircraft model

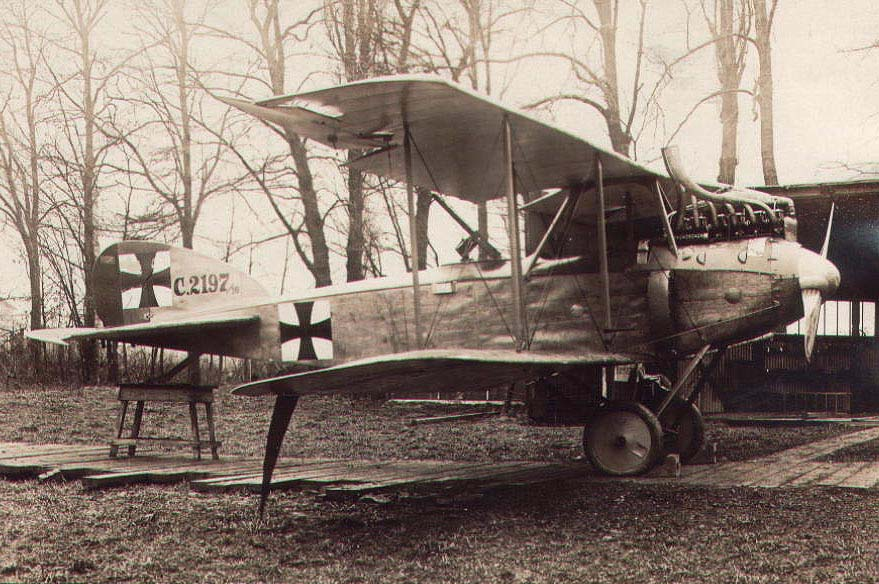

General information
- Type: Reconnaissance aircraft
- Manufacturer: Albatros Flugzeugwerke
- Primary user: Luftstreitkräfte
- Number built: 400

History
- Manufactured: 1916
- Introduction date: late 1916
- First flight: early 1916
- Retired: 1918
- Developed from: Albatros C.V

The Albatros C.VII was a military reconnaissance aircraft designed and produced by the German aircraft manufacturer Albatros Flugzeugwerke. It was a revised and re-engined development of the Albatros C.V, which had proved disappointing in service.

Developed relatively rapidly during 1916, the C.VII dispensed with the unreliable Mercedes D.IV engine that powered the earlier C.V in favour of the more dependable Benz Bz.IV; this change was accompanied by various modifications to accommodate that powerplant, effectively being a hybrid of the C.V/16 and C.V/17 designs. While considered to be a stop-gap aircraft, it incorporated various refinements to areas such as the flight control surfaces, which resulted in the C.VII possessing excellent handling qualities.

Introduced to service with the Luftstreitkräfte during late 1916, it proved itself to be less troublesome than its predecessor. At one point, the C.VII comprised the bulk of all reconnaissance aircraft being operated by Germany during the First World War, roughly 350 aircraft were in service at the peak of operations. It saw action on all fronts of the conflict.

== Design & development ==
Work commenced on what would become the C.VII as soon as Albatros became aware that production of the troublesome Mercedes D.IV engine was facing termination, which impacted the company's existing Albatros C.V reconnaissance aircraft as it was solely powered by the D.IV - without a compatible engine, production could not be continued. Albatros's design team hastily drew up multiple proposals as alternative options; one of these, internationally designated C.VI, was considered to be a retrograde step and ultimately not pursued for production. What would become the C.VII was largely considered to be a stop-gap measure while the company designed a higher performance successor later on; accordingly, the use of as many standard components and subassemblies of the C.V was encouraged while the most substantial change was the adoption of the Benz Bz.IV engine, an established and dependable powerplant.

One of the main visual distinguishing differences between the C.V and the C.VII was the cylinder block of the engine; on the latter aircraft, this protruded above the inspection panels. Engine cooling used radiators attached to the sides of the fuselage just forward of the lower wing's leading edge. The forward fuselage had to be redesigned to properly accommodate the Bz.IV engine and its ancillary components. The fuselage structure largely conformed with the company's established practices, making extensive use of plywood and not using any internal bracing. The wings were directly derived from both versions of the C.I; specifically, the upper wing was almost identical to that of the C.V/17 while the lower wing was the more angular design used on the C.V/16. The empennage and undercarriage were similarly derived. The flying controls also had no innovation over their predecessor.

== Operational history ==
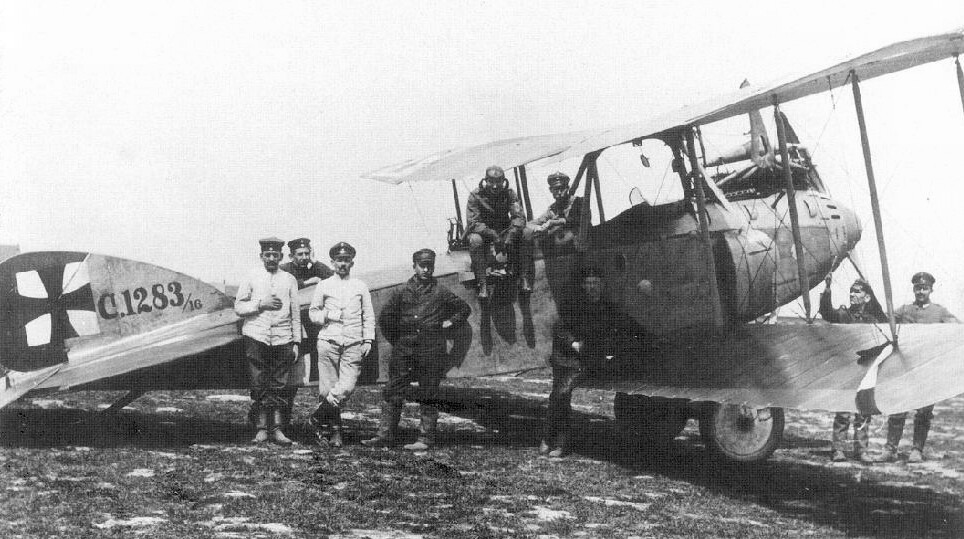
Personnel standing in front of a C.VII on the ground, circa 1917

The Luftstreitkräfte commenced operations with the C.VII during late 1916. It quickly proved to be a well-received aircraft and was often praised for its favourable handling qualities, being fairly comfortable and untiring to operate while also not exhibiting challenging characteristics during the landing phase as some of its competing two-seaters did. By the end of 1916, the C.VII had become a staple of both the aerial reconnaissance and artillery spotting roles; it was operated on all fronts of the war.

== Variants ==
C.VI
N.I
Night-bomber variant.
L 18
A single C.VII converted for civil use post WWI

== Operators ==
German Empire

- Luftstreitkräfte

== Specifications (C.VII) ==
Data from German Aircraft of the First World War

General characteristics

- Crew: Two (pilot and observer)
- Length: 8.70 m (28 ft 6 in)
- Wingspan: 12.78 m (41 ft 11 in)
- Height: 3.8 m (12 ft 6 in)
- Wing area: 43.4 m^{2} (467 sq ft)
- Empty weight: 989 kg (2,180 lb)
- Gross weight: 1,550 kg (3,420 lb)
- Powerplant: 1 × Benz Bz.IV , 150 kW (200 hp)

Performance

- Maximum speed: 170 km/h (110 mph, 96 kn)
- Endurance: 3 1/3 hours
- Service ceiling: 5,000 m (16,500 ft)
- Rate of climb: 3.2 m/s (630 ft/min)

Armament

- 1 × forward-firing 7.92 mm (.312 in) Spandau LMG 08/15 machine gun
- 1 × 7.92 mm (.312 in) Parabellum MG14 machine gun for observer
- 90 kg (200 lb) of bombs
