= DFW Dr.I =

WWI German fighter aircraft

Dr.I

General information
- Type: Fighter aircraft
- Manufacturer: DFW
- Status: prototype only
- Primary user: Luftstreitkräfte
- Number built: 1

History
- First flight: 1917

The DFW Dr.I was a prototype German fighter aircraft built during World War I.

== Design and development ==
The DFW Dr.I prototype shared many design attributes with the D.I biplane, especially the Mercedes D.III piston engine. Therefore, the design of the D.I was used in building the Dr.I. It first flew in 1917, and in January 1918 was prepared for the fighter competition held at Adlershof in early 1918 along with the Euler Dr.II and Hansa-Brandenburg L.16. However, none of the entrants was chosen, and the Dr.I remained a prototype only.

== Specifications ==
Data from DFW Aircraft of WWI: A Centennial Perspective on Great War Airplanes

General characteristics

- Crew: 1
- Length: 4.5 m (14 ft 9 in)
- Wingspan: 8.2 m (26 ft 11 in)
- Height: 2.7 m (8 ft 10 in)
- Powerplant: 1 × Mercedes D.III 6-cylinder water-cooled inline piston, 75 kW (100 hp)
- Propellers: 2-bladed

Performance Armament

- 2 × front 7.92 mm machine guns LMG 08/15 Spandau

== Bibliography ==
- Gray, Peter & Thetford, Owen (1987) [1970]. German Aircraft of the First World War (2nd ed.). London: Putnam. ISBN 0-85177-809-7.
- Green, William & Swanborough, Gordon (2001) [1994]. The Complete Book of Fighters: An Illustrated Encyclopedia of Every Fighter Built and Flown (Revised and Updated ed.). London: Salamander Books. ISBN 1-84065-269-1.
- Herris, Jack (2017). DFW Aircraft of WWI: A Centennial Perspective on Great War Airplanes. Great War Aviation Centennial Series. Vol. 29. n.p.: Aeronaut Books. ISBN 978-1-935881-54-4.
