= AEG C.IV =

1916 reconnaissance aircraft

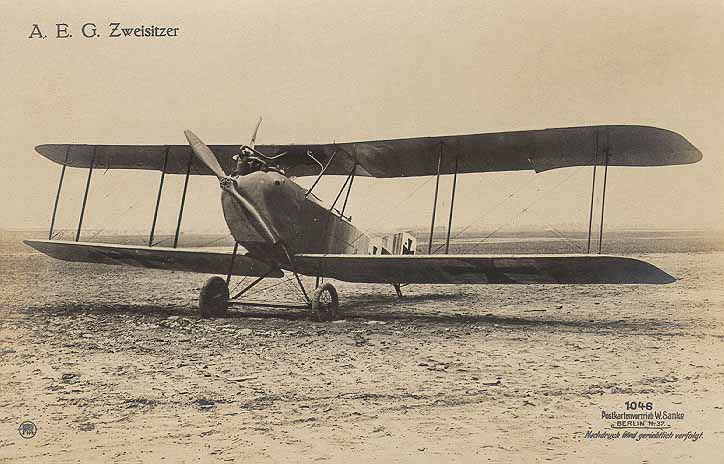

General information
- Type: Reconnaissance aircraft
- Manufacturer: Allgemeine Elektrizitäts-Gesellschaft
- Primary users: Luftstreitkräfte Turkish Flying Corps; Polish Air Force
- Number built: 687 (Leon)

History
- Introduction date: 1916

The AEG C.IV was a two-seat biplane reconnaissance aircraft designed and produced by the German aircraft manufacturer Allgemeine Elektrizitäts-Gesellschaft.

The C.IV was developed from the earlier AEG C.II in response to an urgent requirement from the Luftstreitkräfte (Imperial German Army Air Service) for better fixed-wing aerial reconnaissance platforms. Featuring a relatively short fuselage in comparison to its wingspan, it appeared somewhat ungainly. The aircraft's structure was largely composed of steel tubing; uncommon features of the design included a distinctive 'bite' on the trailing edge of the wing on production aircraft, and the three-position adjustable tail plane incidence. To accelerate production, the Dutch aircraft manufacturer Fokker were ordered to produce the C.IV under license.

Entering service with the Luftstreitkräfte during 1916, the C.IV promptly proved itself to be a capable aircraft. In addition to performing reconnaissance missions, it was also used as a bomber escort, despite being inadequately powered for this role. Several variants, including the C.IV.N and the C.IVa, were developed. It continued to be operated by the Luftstreitkräfte through to the end of the conflict. In addition to its use by the German Empire, the C.IV also drew the attention of other nations, both the Turkish Flying Corps and Polish Air Force would operate numerous aircraft while other nations, such as Belgium, evaluated the type. It saw extensive combat use during the Polish-Soviet War of 1919-1920 prior to being withdrawn for good during the early 1920s.

== Design and development ==
By 1916, a growing number of senior officers within the Luftstreitkräfte (Imperial German Army Air Service) were advocated for greater emphasis to be placed upon aerial reconnaissance, noting both its value and the increased capability for such missions that the production of a new generation of purpose-build reconnaissance aircraft could bring to Germany's war effort. As such, several factories were tasked with the rapid development and production of C type aircraft with the intention of equipping several new frontline squadrons as soon as feasibly possible. It was under this programme that the C.IV would be selected and placed into production.

The design of the C.IV was heavily derived from the earlier AEG C.II, the most visually obvious differences being the new aircraft's enlarged wingspan and the adoption of an additional forward-firing Spandau-type 7.92 mm (.312 in) machine gun. It had a relatively short fuselage that gave it a somewhat ungainly appearance. Structurally, aside from the wooden ribs within the wing, various gauges of steel tubing were used, the fuselage featuring braced box-girder construction, which was mostly welded together; this construction approach was uncommon at the time amongst German aircraft. Key locations were strengthened via steel lug nuts, which were also used as mounting points for the attachment of bracing cables.

The C.IV was powered by a single Mercedes D.III six-cylinder inline piston engine, capable of producing up to 160 hp, that was housed within the aircraft's bulbous nose. A sizable radiator was located on the direct underside of the aircraft's main spar to cool the engine, while a large exhaust manifold was set above the top wing. The wings were supported by a pair of steel tube spars; the wooden ribs were interspaced with false ribs while the aileron wires ran inside a steel tube in the lower wing mounted after aft of front spar, providing additional structural strength. The trailing edge of the wing was slightly scalloped, as per typical German aircraft conventions of the era, and had a distinctive 'bite' on production aircraft. Both the tail surfaces and ailerons were unbalanced and featured metal construction; a somewhat unique feature was the adjustable tail plane incidence.

In order to achieve a sufficient rate of production, multiple companies were engaged in the programme. The Dutch aircraft manufacturer Fokker were ordered to produce the C.IV under license, despite the alleged dissatisfaction of the company's founder, Anthony Fokker. By June 1917, around 170 aircraft were believed to have been in service across all battlefronts of the Central Powers; as late as August 1918, at least 40 C.IVs remained in an operational condition.

The C.IV was easily the most successful of AEG's First World War-era B- and C-type reconnaissance aircraft, roughly 687 were reportedly built while the model remained in service right up to the end of the conflict. Various initiatives were undertaken towards improving the aircraft. One variant that was developed in 1917, the C.IV.N, was designed specifically as a prototype night bomber; it was outfitted with the Benz Bz.III engine used in other C-types along with a lengthened wingspan. Another variant, the C.IVa, was powered by a 130 kW (180 hp) Argus As III engine.

A large number of 91 C.IVs were captured by the Polish in 1919, the majority of them having been in Poznań during the Greater Poland Uprising. Most of these aircraft were retained and entered service with the newly emerged Polish Air Force. It became one of the service's standard aircraft, and was frequently used to conduct reconnaissance, bombing, and strafing actions during Polish-Soviet War of 1919–1920. Shortly after the conflict's end, the majority of Polish C.IVs were permanently withdrawn.

== Operators ==
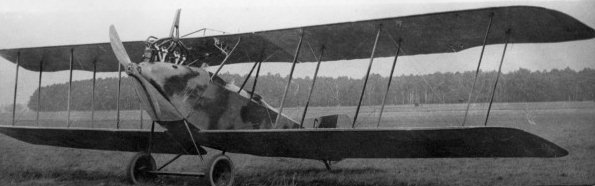
AEG C.IVN

Bulgaria
Bulgarian Air Force
German Empire
Luftstreitkrafte
Kingdom of Hejaz
Hejaz Air Force - single example, not airworthy
Poland
Polish Air Force - up to 91 aircraft, used postwar
Turkey
Ottoman Air Force

== Specifications (AEG C.IV) ==
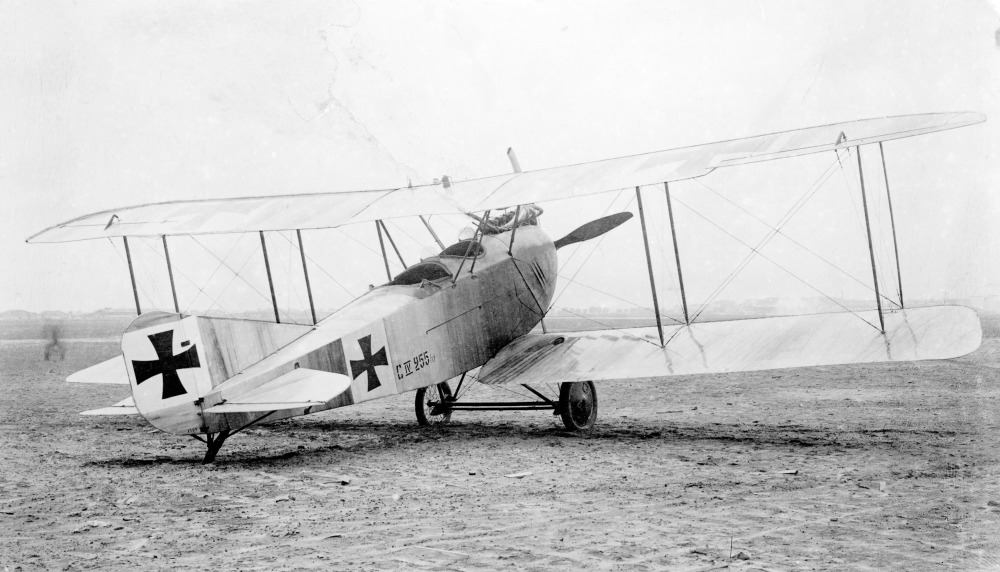
AEG C.IV

Data from German Aircraft of the First World War

General characteristics

- Crew: 2
- Length: 7.15 m (23 ft 5 in)
- Wingspan: 13.46 m (44 ft 2 in)
- Height: 3.35 m (11 ft 0 in)
- Wing area: 39 m^{2} (420 sq ft)
- Empty weight: 800 kg (1,764 lb)
- Gross weight: 1,120 kg (2,469 lb)
- Powerplant: 1 × Mercedes D.III six-cylinder, water-cooled, inline piston engine, 120 kW (160 hp)

Performance

- Maximum speed: 158 km/h (98 mph, 85 kn)
- Range: 450 km (280 mi, 240 nmi)
- Endurance: four hours
- Service ceiling: 5,000 m (16,000 ft)
- Rate of climb: 2.78 m/s (547 ft/min)
- Time to altitude: 1,000m in six minutes

Armament

- Guns: * 1 × forward-firing 7.92 mm (.312 in) LMG 08/15 "Spandau" machine gun
- 1 × 7.92 mm (.312 in) Parabellum MG14 machine gun in ring mount for observer
- Bombs: * Bomb load up to 100 kg (220 lb)

== See also ==
Related development

- AEG C.II
- AEG J.I
