= DFW Floh =

German fighter aircraft

Floh
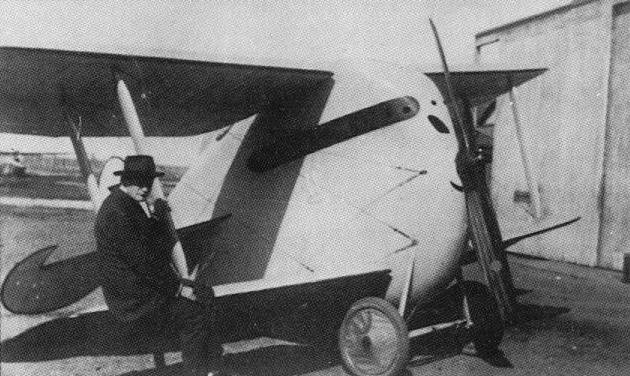
- DFW T.28 Floh circa 1915

General information
- Type: Biplane fighter aircraft
- National origin: Germany
- Manufacturer: Deutsche Flugzeug-Werke
- Designer: Hermann Dorner
- Number built: 1

History
- First flight: 1915

The DFW T.28 Floh (English: Flea) was a small German biplane fighter prototype designed by Hermann Dorner, the designer of the successful Hannover CL.II two-seat fighter of 1917, and built by Deutsche Flugzeug-Werke.

Designed in 1915 as a high-speed fighter, the Floh had a small 6.20 m (20.3 ft) wingspan and a rather ungainly tall and thin fuselage. With a fixed conventional landing gear the Floh was powered by a 100 hp (75 kW) Mercedes D.I inline piston engine, and on its first flight in December 1915 reached 180 km/h (110 mph), quite fast for the time.

The aircraft suffered from very poor forward visibility and was difficult to land due to its narrow landing gear. The prototype crashed during the flight testing programme.

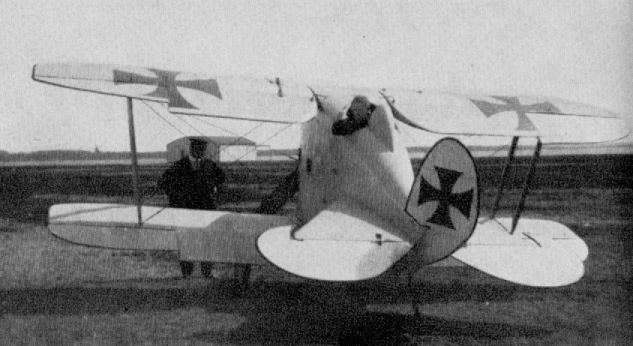
View showing poor forward visibility

== Specifications ==
Data from DFW Aircraft of WWI: A Centennial Perspective on Great War Airplanes

General characteristics

- Crew: 1
- Length: 4.5 m (14 ft 9 in)
- Wingspan: 6.5 m (21 ft 4 in)
- Wing area: 15 m^{2} (160 sq ft)
- Empty weight: 352 kg (776 lb)
- Gross weight: 596 kg (1,314 lb)
- Powerplant: 1 × Mercedes D.I water-cooled inline piston, 75 kW (100 hp)
- Propellers: 2-bladed

Performance

- Maximum speed: 180 km/h (110 mph, 97 kn)

Armament

- 1 × 7.92mm (0.312 in) LMG 08/15 Spandau machine gun

== Bibliography ==
- Gray, Peter & Thetford, Owen (1987) [1970]. German Aircraft of the First World War (2nd ed.). Putnam. ISBN 0-85177-809-7.
- Green, William & Swanborough, Gordon (2001) [1994]. The Complete Book of Fighters: An Illustrated Encyclopedia of Every Fighter Built and Flown (Revised and Updated ed.). Salamander Books. ISBN 1-84065-269-1.
- Grosz, Peter M. (2001). DFW T28 Flea. Windsock Mini Datafile. Vol. 18. Albatros Productions. ISBN 1-902227-33-5.
- Herris, Jack (2017). DFW Aircraft of WWI: A Centennial Perspective on Great War Airplanes. Great War Aviation Centennial Series. Vol. 29. Aeronaut Books. ISBN 978-1-935881-54-4.
