= AEG B.I =

WWI German reconnaissance aircraft

B.I
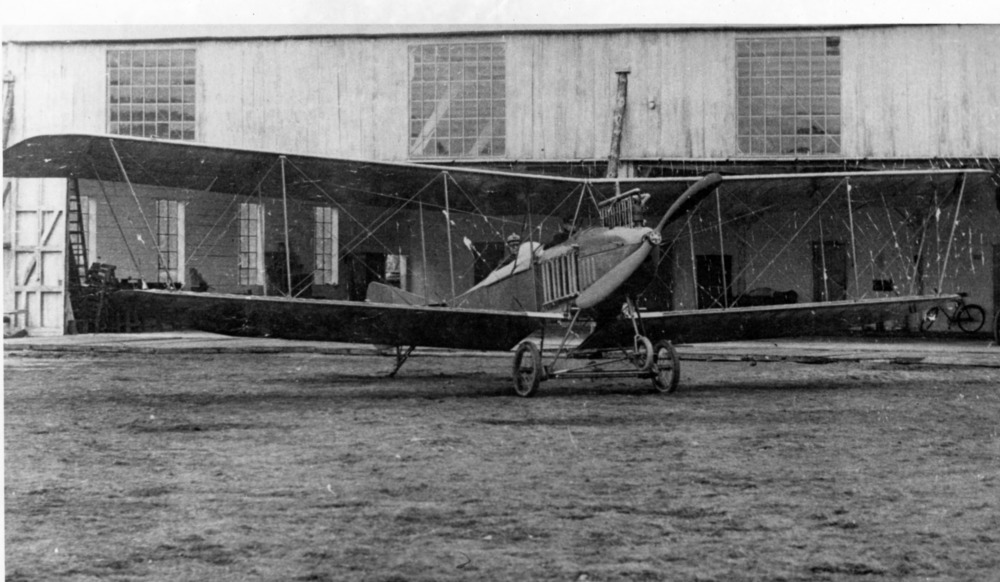

General information
- Type: Reconnaissance aircraft
- Manufacturer: AEG

History
- Introduction date: 1914
- First flight: 1914

The AEG B.I was a German two-seat biplane unarmed reconnaissance aircraft produced in very small numbers in 1914. It formed the basis for the more successful B- and C-type aircraft from AEG.

== Operators ==
- German Empire
  - Luftstreitkräfte

== Specifications (AEG B.I) ==
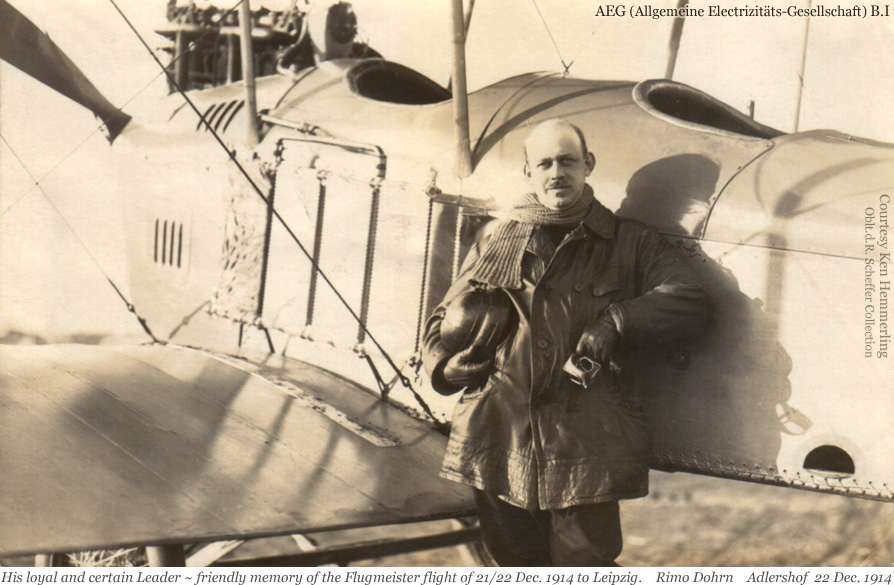
AEG B.I

General characteristics

- Crew: 2
- Length: 10.5 m (34 ft 5 in)
- Wingspan: 14.5 m (47 ft 7 in)
- Wing area: 44 m^{2} (470 sq ft)
- Empty weight: 650 kg (1,433 lb)
- Max takeoff weight: 1,040 kg (2,293 lb)
- Powerplant: 1 × Mercedes D.I 6-cyl. water-cooled in-line piston engine, 74.5 kW (99.9 hp)

Performance

- Maximum speed: 100 km/h (62 mph, 54 kn)
- Service ceiling: 2,500 m (8,200 ft)
- Wing loading: 24 kg/m^{2} (4.9 lb/sq ft)

== See also ==
Aircraft of comparable role, configuration, and era

- AEG B.II
- AEG B.III

== Bibliography ==
- Herris, Jack (2015). A.E.G. Aircraft of WWI: A Centennial Perspective on Great War Airplanes. Great War Aviation Centennial Series. Vol. 16. n. p.: Aeronaut Books. ISBN 978-1-935881-28-5.
