= AEG C.I =

Reconnaissance aircraft model (1915)

General information
- Type: Reconnaissance aircraft
- Manufacturer: AEG
- Primary user: Imperial German Flying Corps

History
- Introduction date: 1915

The AEG C.I was a two-seat biplane reconnaissance aircraft built by the Allgemeine Elektricitäts-Gesellschaft (AEG) during the First World War for the Imperial German Army's (Deutsches Heer) Imperial German Air Service (Luftstreitkräfte). It was a modified version of the B.II training aircraft with a machine gun added for the observer, a more powerful engine and different wings. First flown in 1915, it remained in front-line service until mid-1916, after which it became a trainer.

== Development ==
The C.I was based on the B.II although it was fitted with a water-cooled 150-horsepower (110 kW) Benz Bz.III straight-six piston engine and the two-bay wing planform had been changed. It did retain the B.II's wing-folding mechanism. The rear cockpit was modified to accommodate an observer armed with a single 7.92-millimetre (0.312 in) machine gun, usually a Parabellum MG 14 or, more rarely, a Bergmann MG 15nA.

The Inspectorate of Flying Troops (Inspektion der Fliegertruppen) ordered a batch of six C.Is in early 1915 and the first aircraft was completed in March. Sixty-four more were ordered in four batches over the next several months. Front-line strength peaked at 34 aircraft on 28 February and 30 April 1916 and they were then transferred to training units as no C.Is are shown assigned to front-line units on 30 June.

== Specifications (AEG C.I) ==
Data from German Aircraft of the First World War; A.E.G. Aircraft of WWI: A Centennial Perspective on Great War Airplanes

General characteristics

- Crew: 2
- Length: 7.95 m (26 ft 1 in)
- Upper wingspan: 13.07 m (42 ft 11 in)
- Lower wingspan: 11.83 m (38 ft 10 in)
- Wing area: 36 m^{2} (390 sq ft)
- Empty weight: 710 kg (1,565 lb)
- Gross weight: 1,125 kg (2,480 lb)
- Powerplant: 1 × Benz Bz.III water-cooled, straight-six piston engine, 110 kW (150 hp)
- Propellers: 2-bladed

Performance

- Maximum speed: 130 km/h (81 mph, 70 kn)
- Time to altitude: 11 minutes to 1,000 m (3,300 ft)
- 25 minutes to 2,000 m (6,600 ft)

Armament

- Guns: 1 × 7.92 mm (.312 in) Parabellum MG 14 or Bergmann MG 15nA on a flexible mount
- Bombs: small bombs

== See also ==
Related development

- AEG B.II

Related lists

- List of military aircraft of Germany

== Bibliography ==
- Gray, Peter & Thetford, Owen (1987) [1970]. German Aircraft of the First World War (2nd ed.). London: Putnam. ISBN 0-85177-809-7.
- Herris, Jack (2015). A.E.G. Aircraft of WWI: A Centennial Perspective on Great War Airplanes. Great War Aviation Centennial Series. Vol. 16. n. p.: Aeronaut Books. ISBN 978-1-935881-28-5.
