= AEG B.II =

B.II
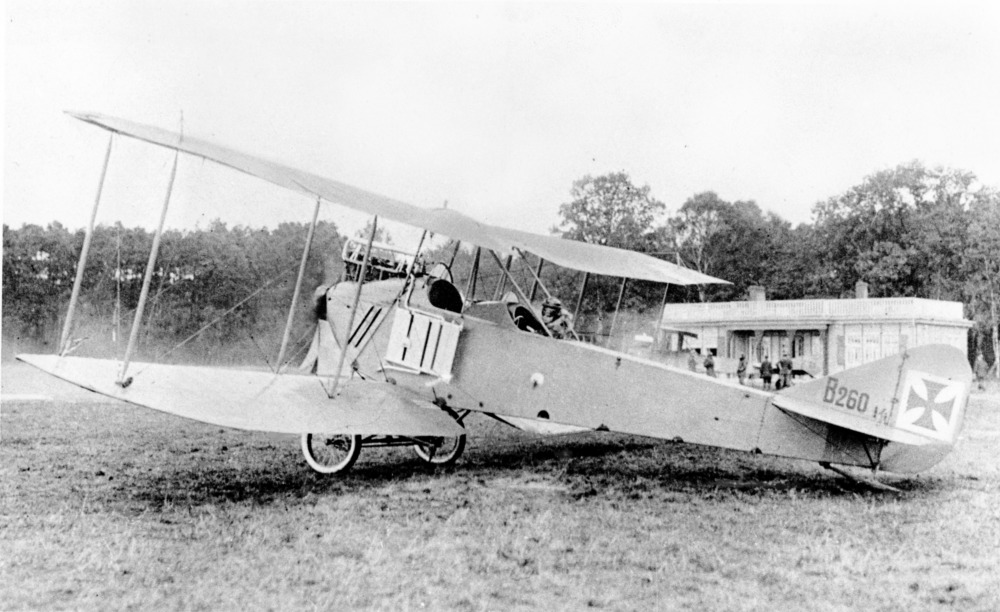

General information
- Type: Reconnaissance aircraft
- Manufacturer: AEG

History
- Introduction date: 1914
- First flight: 1914

The AEG B.II was a two-seat biplane reconnaissance aircraft produced in small numbers from 1914. It was a slightly smaller version of the B.I and proved more successful. They were used in limited numbers throughout 1914 to 1915, but were quickly replaced, as they were often derided for lack of speed and armament.

== Operators ==
- German Empire
  - Luftstreitkräfte

== Specifications (AEG B.II) ==
Data from The Virtual Aviation Museum

General characteristics

- Crew: 2
- Length: 10.5 m (34 ft 5 in)
- Wingspan: 15.5 m (50 ft 10 in)
- Height: 3.15 m (10 ft 4 in)
- Wing area: 40.12 m^{2} (431.8 sq ft)
- Empty weight: 723 kg (1,594 lb)
- Max takeoff weight: 650 kg (1,433 lb)
- Powerplant: 1 × Mercedes D.II 6-cyl. water-cooled in-line piston engine, 89.5 kW (120.0 hp)

Performance

- Maximum speed: 110 km/h (68 mph, 59 kn)
- Cruise speed: 110 km/h (68 mph, 59 kn)
- Range: 1,130 km (700 mi, 610 nmi)
- Service ceiling: 3,000 m (9,800 ft)
- Wing loading: 27 kg/m^{2} (5.5 lb/sq ft)

== See also ==
Related development

- AEG C.I

== Bibliography ==
- Herris, Jack (2015). A.E.G. Aircraft of WWI: A Centennial Perspective on Great War Airplanes. Great War Aviation Centennial Series. Vol. 16. n. p.: Aeronaut Books. ISBN 978-1-935881-28-5.
