= Albatros C.V =

1916 German reconnaissance aircraft

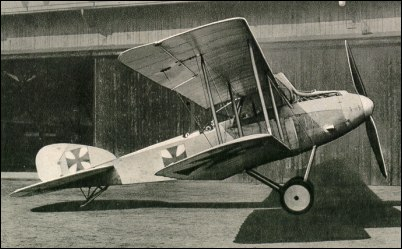

General information
- Type: Reconnaissance aircraft
- Manufacturer: Albatros Flugzeugwerke
- Primary user: Luftstreitkräfte
- Number built: ~400

The Albatros C.V was a military reconnaissance aircraft designed and produced by the German aircraft manufacturer Albatros Flugzeugwerke.

It was developed to make use of the newly-available Mercedes D.IV eight-cylinder engine. While the C.V drew greatly upon the company's previous aircraft, it featured greater use of balanced flight control surfaces and a new tail design. These changes also resulted in a heavier aircraft than its predecessors. Initially internally designated C.V/16, initial flight testing found that the aircraft's performance was lacking, particularly in terms of the flight controls being cumbersome and demanding, thus redesign work commenced. The resulting aircraft, which was designated C.V/17 by the company, showed improved handling and thus proceeded into quantity production.

The Luftstreitkräfte promptly accepted delivery of the type, using it active combat during the First World War. However, the unreliable Mercedes D.IV engine hurt aircraft availability and its manufacturer was unable to resolve the engine issues. Instead, production of the power plant stopped, leaving the C.V without an engine, thus forcing an early end of production of the type. It was replaced by the Albatros C.VII while existing C.Vs were quickly withdrawn from service due to the engine issues.

== Design and development ==
The availability of a powerful new eight-cylinder engine in the form of the Mercedes D.IV was a major impetus for the development of the C.V. Albatros Flugzeugwerke had quickly determined that the increased weight and length of the engine made it unpractical to install upon its existing airframes without a redesign. Numerous changes from its immediate predecessors were enacted by the design team, such as the decision to almost entirely enclose the engine with removable panels; further aerodynamic improvements were achieved via the addition of a sizable blunt spinner.

The fuselage of the C.V was largely reminiscent of the Albatros C.III and various other prior aircraft by the company, consisting of slab-sided plywood construction; deviations included the somewhat more spacious arrangement and the use of an integral vertical fin, which was also covered with plywood. For the first time on an operational Albatros-designed twin-seat aircraft, a balanced rudder was used, which had a steel tube structure and fabric covering. The elevator, while remaining unbalanced, was redesigned to use a one-piece control system without any division. Armament comprised a forward-firing machine gun that was aligned with a gun synchronizer in addition to the single 7.92 mm (0.312 in) Parabellum MG14 machine gun on a rotating mounting that was operated by the observer; it could also carry bombs and be furnished with a radio set dependent upon mission role.

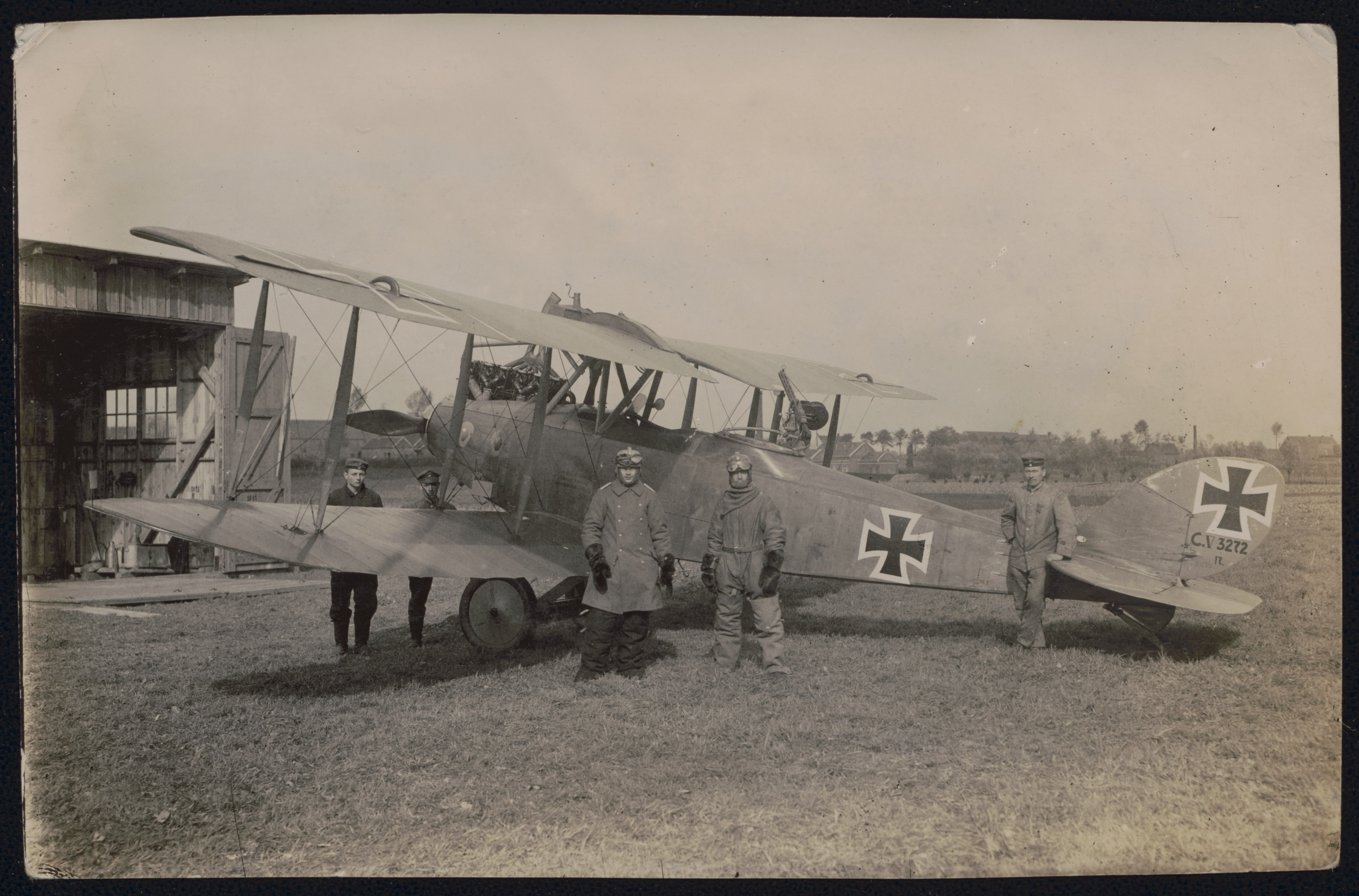
Albatros C.V with crew, circa 1917

The wings had a greater span than that of the C.III while the chord of the lower wing was increased to match the upper wing, but otherwise followed the same general configuration. The undercarriage of the C.V was of a conventional design, its structure largely comprising steel tubing, in conjunction with an externally-spring tailskid mounted on inverted pyramidal struts. Engine cooling was originally achieved via radiators fitted to the sides of the forward fuselage just above the leading edge of the lower wing; their presence somewhat detracted from the overall cleanliness of the airframe.

Primarily due to the increased weight and size of the C.V, early flight testing found that the aircraft was demanding and somewhat cumbersome to fly, to the extent that the design team opted to make numerous changes to the design, the original configuration being referred to as the C.V/16. Albatros elected to reorientate the exhaust manifold from a horizontal to a sideways position, while a new aerofoil-shaped radiator arrangement installed within the center-section of the upper wing. Perhaps the most substantial element of the redesign was the adoption of an entirely new lower wing, which had an elliptical tip profile; the ailerons of the upper wing were also altered, adopting large rectangular balanced sections. Balanced elevators were also adopted along with an internally-sprung tailskid.

The redesigned aircraft, which had the factory designation of C.V/17, possessed improved performance and superior handling characteristics. The C.V was Albatros' first revision of their B- and C-type reconnaissance aircraft since Ernst Heinkel's departure from the firm to join rival aircraft manufacturer Hansa-Brandenburg.

== Operational history ==
The Luftstreitkräfte introduced the revised C.V, but quickly became dissatisfied with its performance, being unable to match the reliability of the Albatros D.III. This was largely attributable to the continuous and serious issues of its Mercedes D.IV engine, which frequently suffered from crankshaft failures amongst other troubles. Unable to overcome this pitfall, production of the engine was terminated, which also forced production of the C.V to be ended after the completion of no more than 424 aircraft. It was promptly replaced in production by the Albatros C.VII.

== Variants ==
C.V/16
Original design with radiators on fuselage sides.
C.V/17
Revised aircraft with radiator on upper wing, and redesigned lower wing.

== Operators ==
German Empire

- Luftstreitkräfte

== Specifications (C.V) ==
Data from German Aircraft of the First World War

General characteristics

- Crew: two (pilot and observer)
- Length: 8.95 m (29 ft 4 in)
- Wingspan: 12.78 m (41 ft 11 in)
- Height: 4.5 m (14 ft 9 in)
- Wing area: 43.4 m^{2} (467 sq ft)
- Empty weight: 1,069 kg (2,357 lb)
- Gross weight: 1,585 kg (3,494 lb)
- Powerplant: 1 × Mercedes D.IV , 164 kW (220 hp)

Performance

- Maximum speed: 170 km/h (110 mph, 96 kn)
- Range: 450 km (280 mi, 240 nmi)
- Service ceiling: 3,000 m (9,840 ft)
- Rate of climb: 2.1 m/s (410 ft/min)

Armament

- 1 × 7.92 mm (.312 in) Parabellum MG14 or Spandau LMG 08/15 machine gun for observer
- 180 kg (400 lb) of bombs

== Bibliography ==
- Grey, Peter; Thetford, Owen (1970). German Aircraft of the First World War (2nd ed.). London: Putnam. ISBN 0-370-00103-6.
