= Mercedes D.I =

Type of engine

D.I
- Type: Inline piston engine
- National origin: Germany
- Manufacturer: Mercedes
- First run: 1913
- Developed into: Mercedes D.II

The Mercedes D.I (also known as the Type E6F) was a six-cylinder, water-cooled, SOHC valvetrain inline engine developed in Germany for use in aircraft in 1913. Developing 75 kW (100 hp), it powered many German military aircraft during the very early part of World War I.

== Applications ==
- AEG B.I
- AEG G.I
- Albatros B.I
- Albatros G.I
- Aviatik B.I
- DFW B.I
- DFW Floh
- Fokker D.I
- Friedrichshafen FF.19
- Gotha G.I
- LFG V 39
- LFG Roland Arrow
- Stahlwerk-Mark R.V
- Pfalz E.V

== Specifications (D.I) ==
Data from "Albatros D.I-D.II","Airplane Engine Encyclopedia"

=== General characteristics ===
- Type: 6-cylinder, inline piston engine
- Bore: 120 mm (4.72 in)
- Stroke: 140 mm (5.51 in)
- Displacement: 9.48 L (578.51 cu in)
- Dry weight: 201.6 kg (444 lb)

=== Components ===
- Valvetrain: SOHC
- Reduction gear: Direct drive, left-hand tractor

=== Performance ===
- Power output: 75 kW (100 hp)
- Specific fuel consumption: .53 lb/(hp·h)
- Oil consumption: .033 lb/(hp·h)

== See also ==
Comparable engines

- Rolls-Royce Hawk

Related lists

- List of aircraft engines
