= Mercedes D.IV =

Aircraft engine model

D.IV
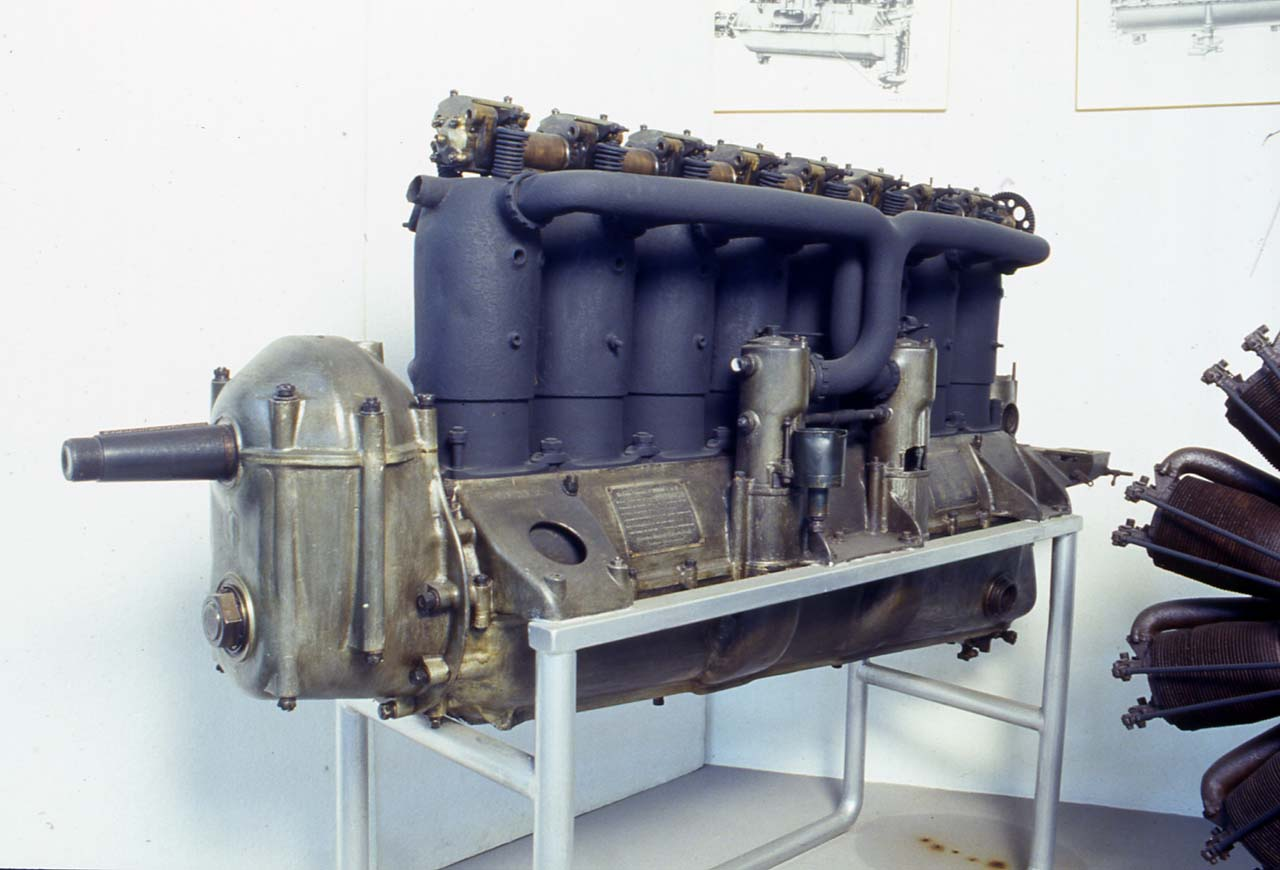
- Type: Inline piston engine
- Manufacturer: Daimler Motoren Gesellschaft (DMG)
- Developed from: Mercedes D.III

The Mercedes D.IV was an eight-cylinder, liquid-cooled inline aircraft engine built by Daimler Motoren Gesellschaft (DMG) and used on a small number of German aircraft during World War I.

== Design and development ==
The design was based around the pistons of the ubiquitous D.III 6-cylinder design and developed 162 kW (217 hp), making it a Class IV motor under the IdFlieg classification system then in use in Imperial Germany. It also employed reduction gearing. When the reliability of the engine proved disappointing, it was supplanted in production by the unrelated six-cylinder Mercedes D.IVa. Specifically, the long crankshaft used in extending the original straight-six design to a straight-eight proved susceptible to breakage.

== Applications ==
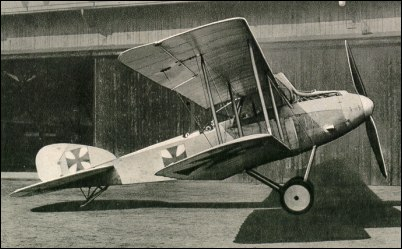
Albatross C.V

- AEG C.V
- AEG G.III
- AEG R.I
- AGO C.II
- AGO C.VIII
- Albatros C.V
- DFW R.I
- Gotha G.II
- LVG C.IV

== Specifications ==
Data from

=== General characteristics ===
- Type: 8-cylinder water-cooled inline aircraft piston engine
- Bore: 140 mm (5.5 in)
- Stroke: 160 mm (6.3 in)
- Displacement: 19.7 L (1,202.4 in^{3})
- Length: 1,990 mm (78 in)
- Width: 600 mm (24 in)
- Height: 1,040 mm (41 in)
- Dry weight: 365 kg (800 lb)

=== Components ===
- Cooling system: Water-cooled

=== Performance ===
- Power output: 162 kW (217 hp) at 1,400 rpm

== See also ==
Related lists

- List of aircraft engines
