= DFW B.I =

B.I and B.II
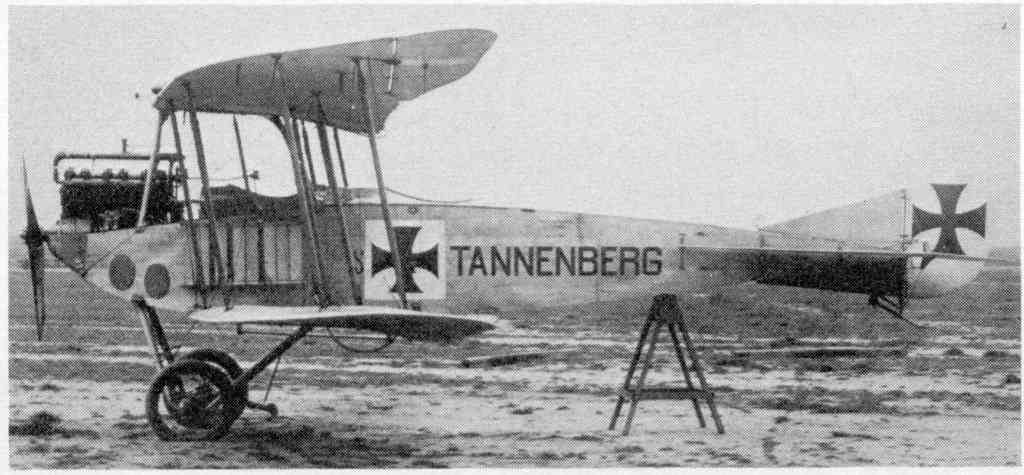
- DFW B.I Tannenberg

General information
- Type: Reconnaissance / Trainer
- Manufacturer: Deutsche Flugzeugwerke
- Primary user: Luftstreitkräfte

History
- Introduction date: 1914
- First flight: 1914
- Retired: 1918

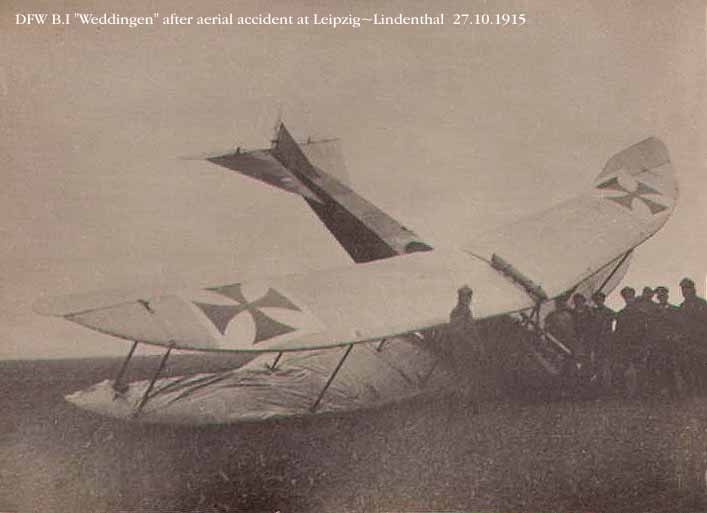
Crashed DFW B.I "Weddingen" showing shape of wings

The DFW B.I (factory designation MD14) was a biplane reconnaissance aircraft and trainer built by the Deutsche Flugzeug-Werke (DFW) during the First World War for the Imperial German Army's (Deutsches Heer) Imperial German Air Service (Fliegertruppen des deutschen Kaiserreiches). It first flew before the start of the war in August 1914 and was still in service as a trainer in 1918.

== Development ==
DFW designed the B.I as an unarmed, two-seat observation biplane for the Imperial Air Service in 1914, with its fuselage built from steel tubing and three-bay wing from wire-braced wood, both covered in doped fabric. The aircraft had a distinctive appearance that differentiated it from its contemporaries as the leading edge of its wings curved to the junction with the trailing edge. Its shape was inspired by that of the earlier Rumpler Taube monoplane, and led to the DFW aircraft being named the "Flying Banana" (Fliegende Banane) by its pilots. The observer's cockpit was located beneath the upper wing while the pilot's was behind the wing's trailing edge. The aircraft flew a variety of water-cooled engines, although the 100-horsepower (75 kW) Mercedes D.I straight-six engine was commonly used. Some B.Is were fitted with the more powerful Mercedes D.II or Benz Bz.III engines. Its radiators were located on the sides of the fuselage and its cylindrical fuel tank was positioned above the upper wing.

The B.II was similar but had a more conventionally shaped two-bay wing with a straight leading edge. It mostly served as a trainer through the end of the war.

== Specifications (DFW B.I) ==
Data from German Aircraft of the First World War; Reconnaissance & Bomber Aircraft of the 1914-1918 War; DFW Aircraft of WWI: A Centennial Perspective on Great War Airplanes

General characteristics

- Crew: 2
- Length: 8.4 m (27 ft 7 in)
- Upper wingspan: 14 m (45 ft 11 in)
- Lower wingspan: 13.16 m (43 ft 2 in)
- Height: 3.18 m (10 ft 5 in)
- Empty weight: 650 kg (1,433 lb)
- Gross weight: 1,015 kg (2,238 lb)
- Powerplant: 1 × Mercedes D.I water-cooled straight-six piston engine, 75 kW (100 hp)
- Propellers: 2-bladed

Performance

- Maximum speed: 120 km/h (75 mph, 65 kn)
- Time to altitude: 5 minutes to 1,000 m (3,300 ft)

== See also ==
Related lists

- List of military aircraft of Germany

== Bibliography ==
- Gray, Peter & Thetford, Owen (1987) [1970]. German Aircraft of the First World War (2nd ed.). London: Putnam. ISBN 0-85177-809-7.
- Herris, Jack (2017). DFW Aircraft of WWI: A Centennial Perspective on Great War Airplanes. Great War Aviation Centennial Series. Vol. 29. n.p.: Aeronaut Books. ISBN 978-1-935881-54-4.
- Lamberton, W. M. (1962). Reconnaissance & Bomber Aircraft of the 1914-1918 War. Los Angeles, California: Aero Publishers. OCLC 1819866.
