= AEG C.II =

German two-seat reconnaissance biplane

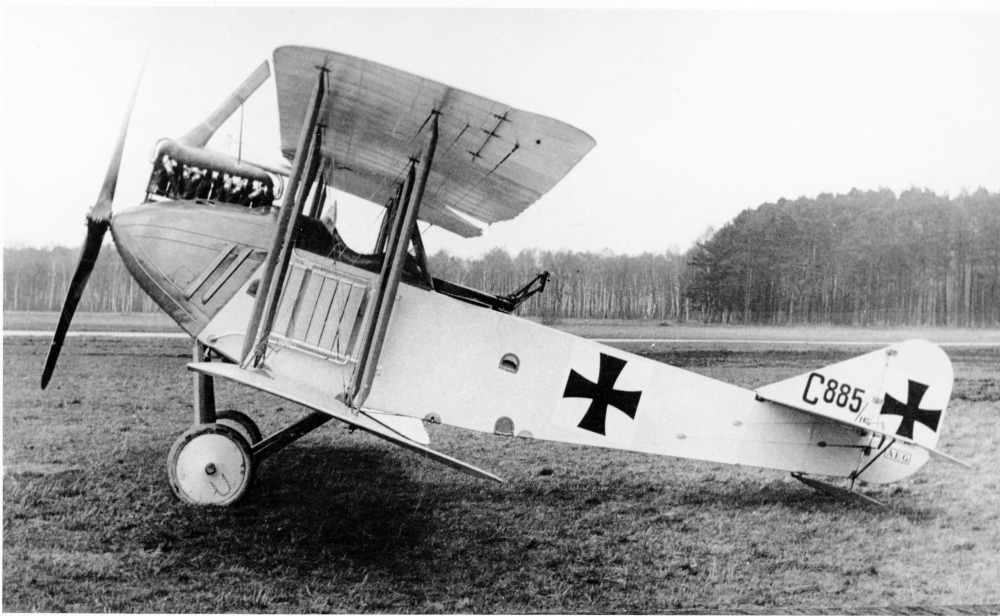

General information
- Type: Reconnaissance aircraft
- Manufacturer: Allgemeine Elektrizitäts-Gesellschaft
- Primary user: Luftstreitkräfte

History
- Introduction date: 1915

The AEG C.II was a two-seat biplane reconnaissance aircraft built by the Allgemeine Elektricitäts-Gesellschaft (AEG) during the First World War for the Imperial German Army's (Deutsches Heer) Imperial German Air Service (Luftstreitkräfte). It was ordered in late 1915 as a better-performing version of the C.I resulting from a smaller and lighter structure. The effort to lighten the aircraft compromised its structure which led to repeated failures during static load testing and relegated it to training and testbed duties.

== Development ==
The C.II was a slightly smaller version of the C.I, but retained the same water-cooled 150-horsepower (110 kW) Benz Bz.III straight-six piston engine and defensive armament. The wing span was slightly reduced, but the chord was increased as was the wing area. This significantly increased the C.II's rate of climb, reducing its time to 1,000 metres (3,300 ft) from eleven minutes to eight. The changes did little for the C.II's speed as it was only 8 kilometres per hour (5.0 mph) faster than the C.I. The C.II did have the ability to carry four 10 kg (22 lb) bombs for light attack duties that the C.I did not.

The Inspectorate of Flying Troops (Inspektion der Fliegertruppen ordered the prototype in mid-1915 and followed it with orders for 36 more in two batches in September and October. The C.I's load testing resulted in multiple failures and the modifications needed to address the problems were so time consuming that the first six aircraft were not delivered until April 1916. One of which was sent to a front-line unit as it is shown on the bimonthly inventory report on 30 April. It was soon withdrawn from combat and transferred to a training unit like most of the rest of the C.IIs. AEG retained several and used them as test mules to evaluate aerodynamic changes in addition to radiator designs.

== Operators ==
German Empire

- Luftstreitkräfte

== Specifications (AEG C.II) ==
Data from German Aircraft of the First World War; A.E.G. Aircraft of WWI: A Centennial Perspective on Great War Airplanes

General characteristics

- Crew: 2
- Length: 7.09 m (23 ft 3 in)
- Upper wingspan: 12 m (39 ft 4 in)
- Lower wingspan: 11.45 m (37 ft 7 in)
- Wing area: 39 m^{2} (420 sq ft)
- Empty weight: 680 kg (1,499 lb)
- Gross weight: 1,200 kg (2,646 lb)
- Powerplant: 1 × Benz Bz.III water-cooled straight-six piston engine, 110 kW (150 hp)
- Propellers: 2-bladed

Performance

- Maximum speed: 138 km/h (86 mph, 75 kn)
- Time to altitude: 8 minutes to 1,000 m (3,300 ft)
- 18 minutes to 2,000 m (6,600 ft)

Armament

- Guns: 1 × 7.92 mm (.312 in) Parabellum MG 14 machine gun
- Bombs: 4 × 10 kg (22 lb) bombs

== Bibliography ==
- Gray, Peter & Thetford, Owen (1987) [1970]. German Aircraft of the First World War (2nd ed.). London: Putnam. ISBN 0-85177-809-7.
- Herris, Jack (2015). A.E.G. Aircraft of WWI: A Centennial Perspective on Great War Airplanes. Great War Aviation Centennial Series. Vol. 16. n. p.: Aeronaut Books. ISBN 978-1-935881-28-5.
