= Deutsche Flugzeug-Werke =

German aircraft manufacturer

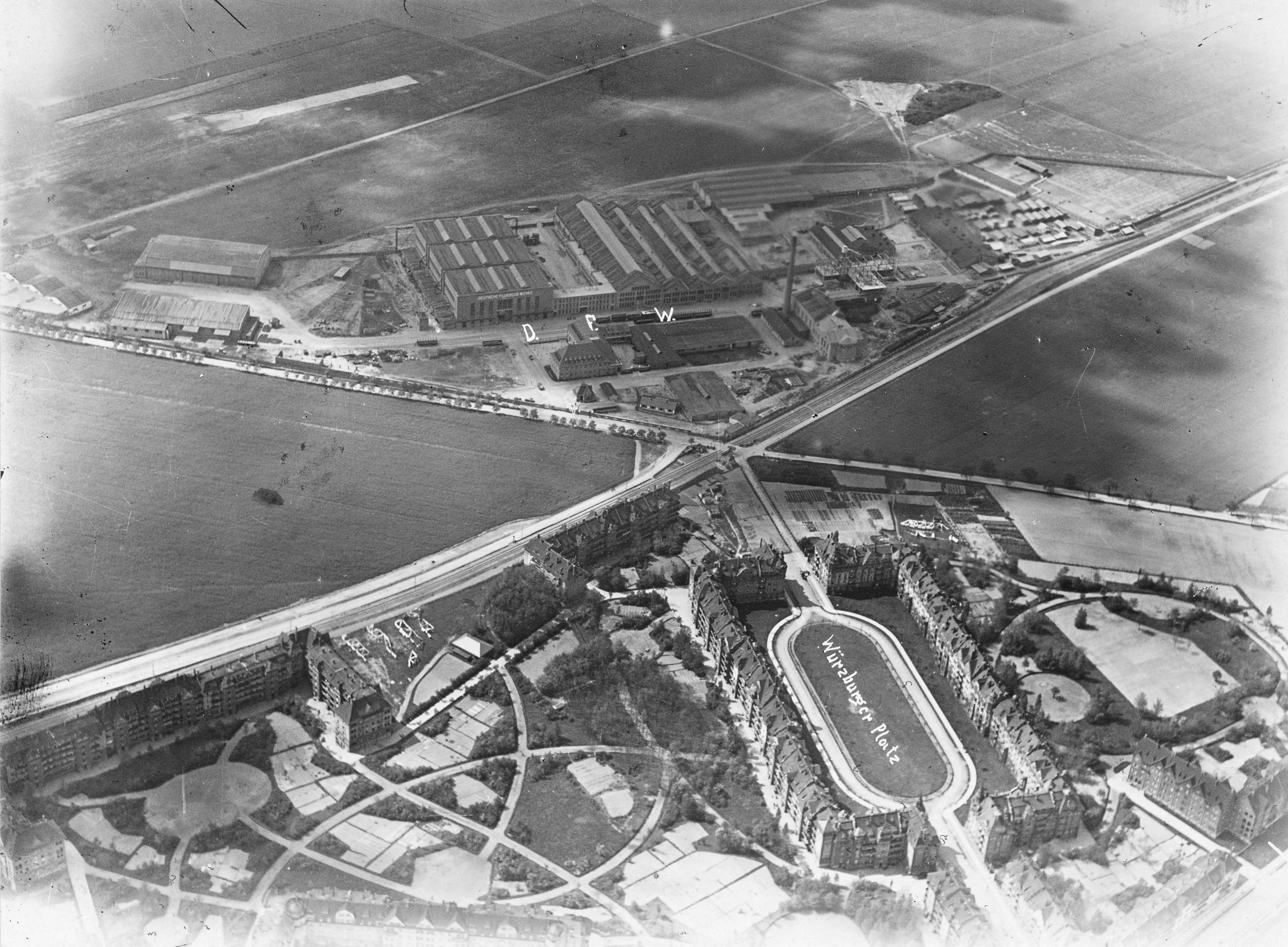
Deutsche Flugzeug-Werke factory in Leipzig (Großzschocher) circa 1920

Deutsche Flugzeug-Werke, usually known as DFW, was a German aircraft manufacturer of the early twentieth century. It was established by Bernhard Meyer and Erich Thiele at Lindenthal in 1910, and initially produced Farman designs under licence, later moving on to the Etrich Taube and eventually to its own designs. One of these, the DFW C.V reconnaissance aircraft, was produced to the extent of several thousand machines, including license production by other firms. When Bernhard Meyer died in April 1917, his son-in-law Kurt Herrmann became general director of DFW.

After the end of the First World War, under the terms of the Treaty of Versailles, the DFW had to cease operations by 18 December 1919. Plans to develop civil aircraft after the war proved fruitless. On Herrmann's initiative, the company was bought by Allgemeine Transportanlagen Gesselschaft on 16 June 1919.

== Aircraft ==
- DFW Mars
- DFW B.I
- DFW C.I
- DFW C.III
- DFW C.V
- DFW D.I
- DFW D.II
- DFW R.I
- DFW R.II
- DFW R.III
- DFW T.28 Floh
