= List of aircraft (Z) =

This is a list of aircraft in alphabetical order beginning with 'Z'.

== Z ==
=== ZAGI ===
(anglicised version of TsAGI Центра́льный аэрогидродинами́ческий институ́т (ЦАГИ) or Tsentralniy Aerogidrodinamicheskiy Institut, the Central Aerohydrodynamic Institute) see:TsAGI

=== Zajicek ===
(Charles A Zajicek, Berwyn, IL)

- Zajicek C-2
- Zajicek C-3
- Zajicek Sport

=== Zalazar ===
(Willam Nicolás Zalazar / Aer Quest)

- Zalazar Nova 21

=== Zalewski ===
(Władislaw Zalewski / Vladimir Fedorovich Savyelyev)

- Zalewski W.Z.I unfinished
- Zalewski W.Z.II glider
- Zalewski W.Z.III (a.k.a. Savyelyev-Zalewski S.Z. No.1) quadruplane
- Zalewski W.Z.IV (a.k.a. Savyelyev-Zalewski S.Z. No.2) quadruplane
- Zalewski W.Z.V (a.k.a. Savyelyev-Zalewski S.Z. No.3) quadruplane
- Zalewski W.Z.VI (4-engined quadruplane - abandoned due to revolution)
- Zalewski W.Z.VIII 'DePeŻe' - unbuilt
- Zalewski W.Z.X
- Zalewski W.Z.XI Kogutek I
- Zalewski W.Z.XII Kogutek II

=== Zaparka ===
(Eduard Zaparka)

- Zaparka experimental fighter

=== Zapata ===
(Franky Zapata)

- Zapata Flyboard Air

=== Zardins ===
(Rudolfs Zardins)

- Zardins' Kristine
- Zardins' Vanadzins

=== Zaschka ===
(Engelbert Zaschka, Freiburg im Breisgau, Germany)

- Zaschka helicopter
- Zaschka Gyroplane
- Zaschka rotary wing system
- Zaschka human powered glider

=== Zea ===
(Antonio Zea, Mexico)

- Zea EPT-1 Teziutlan

=== Zeferu ===
(Asmelash Zeferu, Ethiopia)

- Zeferu K-570

=== Zelinka ===
(Heinrich Zelinka)

- Zelinka experimental fighter

=== Zenair ===
(Zenair Ltd. Midland, Ontario, Canada)

- Zenair Cricket - Kit
- Zenair Zipper
- Zenair Zipper-RX
- Zenair Zipper II
- Zenair CH 50 Mini Z
- Zenair CH 100 Mono-Z
- Zenair CH 150 Acro-Z
- Zenair CH 180 Super Acro-Z
- Zenair CH 200
- Zenair CH 250
- Zenair CH 260 Gemini
- Zenair CH 300
- Zenair CH 300 Tri-Z
- Zenair CH 640
- Zenair CH 650
- Zenair CH 2000

=== Zenith ===
(Zenith Aircraft Company, United States)

- Zenith CH 400
- Zenith CH 600
- Zenith CH 601
- Zenith CH 620 Gemini
- Zenith STOL CH 701
- Zenith STOL CH 750
- Zenith STOL CH 801
- Zenith CH 2000 Alarus

=== Zenith ===
(Zenith Aircraft Mfg. Co.)

- Zenith P-1
- Zenith Sport

=== Zenith ===
(Zenith Aircraft Corporation)

- Zenith Albatross Z-12
- Zenith Albatross Z-6
- American Albatross B-1

=== Zenith ===
(Georges-Gendre)

- Zenith 1910 Monoplane

=== Zens ===
(Paul et Ernest Zens)

- Zens 1908 Canard Biplane

=== Zeppelin-Friedrichshafen ===
for airship designs

- Zeppelin C.I
- Zeppelin C.II

=== Zeppelin-Lindau ===
(Luftschiffbau Zeppelin, Germany)

- Zeppelin-Lindau CL.I
- Zeppelin-Lindau CL.II
- Zeppelin-Lindau CS.I
- Zeppelin-Lindau V1
- Zeppelin-Lindau D.I
- Zeppelin-Lindau Rs.I
- Zeppelin-Lindau Rs.II
- Zeppelin-Lindau Rs.III
- Zeppelin-Lindau Rs.IV
- Zeppelin-Lindau Rs.V (unbuilt)
- Zeppelin-Lindau R.I (unbuilt)

=== Zeppelin Luftschiffbau ===
(Luftschiffbau Zeppelin, Germany)

- List of Zeppelins
- Zeppelin ZSO 523
- Zeppelin Rammer

=== Zeppelin-Staaken ===
(Zeppelin Werke Staaken G.m.b.H.)

- Zeppelin-Staaken VGO.I(RML.1) (VGO-Versuchsbau Gotha-Ost)
- Zeppelin-Staaken VGO.II
- Zeppelin-Staaken VGO.III
- Zeppelin-Staaken R.IV
- Zeppelin-Staaken R.V
- Zeppelin-Staaken R.VI
- Zeppelin-Staaken R.VII
- Zeppelin-Staaken R.VIII
- Zeppelin-Staaken R.IX
- Zeppelin-Staaken R.XIV
- Zeppelin-Staaken R.XV
- Zeppelin-Staaken R.XVI
- Zeppelin-Staaken Type "L"
- Zeppelin-Staaken Type 8301
- Zeppelin-Staaken Type 8307
- Zeppelin-Staaken E.4/20

=== Zerbe ===
(James Slough Zerbe, United States)

- Zerbe Air Sedan
- Zerbe Quintaplane
- Zerbe Sextuplane

=== ZeroAvia ===
- ZeroAvia M350

=== Zero Gravity Paragliders ===
(JM International Company Limited, Seoul, South Korea)

- Zero Gravity Flow
- Zero Gravity Windstar

=== Ziegler ===
(Flugzeugwerke Johann Ziegler Vienna, Austria)

- Ziegler 1912 Biplane
- Ziegler 1912 Monoplane

=== Ziegler ===
- Ziegler (Potsdam) 1912 Monoplane

=== Ziegler ===
- Ziegler shoulder-wing monoplane
- Ziegler high-wing monoplane

=== Zielinski ===
(Edward Zielinski)

- Zielinski 1930 Monoplane

=== ZIG ===
(Zavod Imyennyi Goltsman – Works named for Goltsman)

- ZIG-1

=== Zilina ===
(Zilina Transport Research Institute)

- Zilina Vazka (autogyro)

=== Zimmerman ===
(Charles Horton Zimmerman, United States)

- Zimmerman 1925 circular wing
- Zimmerman 1935 flying pancake

=== Zimmerman ===
(Hugh E. Zimmerman)

- Zimmerman 1931 Biplane

=== Zivko ===
((William & Judy) Zivko Aeronautics Inc, Guthrie, OK)

- Zivko Edge 540

=== Zlatoust Model Club ===
- Zlatoust Malysh

=== Zlín ===
(Zlínská Letecká Akciová Spolecnost / Zlín Moravan Národní Podnik / Moravan Otrokovice, Czechoslovakia)

- Zlín Akrobat
- Zlín Trener
- Zlín Z XII
  - Zlín Z 212
- Zlín Z XIII - (Bata fighter plane designed per Jan A. Bata's specifications 1937)
- Zlín Z 20
- Zlín Z 22 Junák
  - Zlin Z 122
- Zlín Z 26 Trener / Akrobat
  - Zlín Z 126
  - Zlín Z 226
  - Zlín Z 326
  - Zlín Z 526
  - Zlín Z 726
- Zlin Z-35 Heli-Trener
  - Zlin Z-135 Heli-Trener
- Zlín Z 37 Čmelák (agro aircraft)
  - Zlín Z 137
- Zlin-Moravan Z-38
- Zlín Z 42
  - Zlín Z 142
  - Zlín Z 242
- Zlín Z 43
  - Zlín Z 143
- Zlín Z 50
- Zlín Z 181 Bücker Bü 181 Licence
  - Zlín Z 281 Bücker Bü 181 Licence
  - Zlín Z 381 Bücker Bü 181 Licence
- Zlín Savage Classic
- Zlín Savage Cruiser
- Zlin Savage Cub
- Zlín Savage Bobber
- Zlín Savage Cub S

=== Zlokazov ===
- Zlokazov ARK-Z-1

=== Zmaj ===
(Fabrika Aeroplana I Hidroplana Zmaj, Yugoslavia)

- Zmaj Fizir FN
- Zmaj Fizir FP-2
- Fizir FT Nastavni (also known as the Zmaj FP-2)
- Zmaj Fizir FT-1 Nebošja
- Zmaj R-1
- Zmaj Fizir F1M-Jupiter
- Zmaj Fizir-Loren (sic)
- Zmaj Fizir AF.2

=== Zodiac ===
(Societe Zodiac)

- Zodiac l'albatros 1910 monoplane
- Zodiac 1910 monoplane
- Zodiac 1911 Biplane (1)
- Zodiac 1911 Biplane S-2

=== Zodiac ===
(Zodiac Aircraft Corp / Zodiac Aerospace)

- Zodiac Libra-Det

=== Zornes ===
(Charles A. Zornes)

- Zornes 1909 Biplane

=== ZRPSL ===
(Aviation Equipment Repair and Production Works - Zakład Remontów I Produkcji Sprzẹtu Lotniczego)

- ZRPSL EM-10 Bielik
- ZRPSL EM-10 Fenix
- ZRPSL EM-11 Orca

=== Zuchenko ===
- Zhuchenko Vertoplan

=== Zuck-Whitaker ===
((Daniel R) Zuck-(Stanley D) Whitaker, Los Angeles, CA)

- Zuck-Whitaker Plane-Mobile

=== Zurkowski ===
- Zurkowski ZR.1
