= Zeppelin-Lindau Rs.IV =

Type of aircraft

Rs.IV
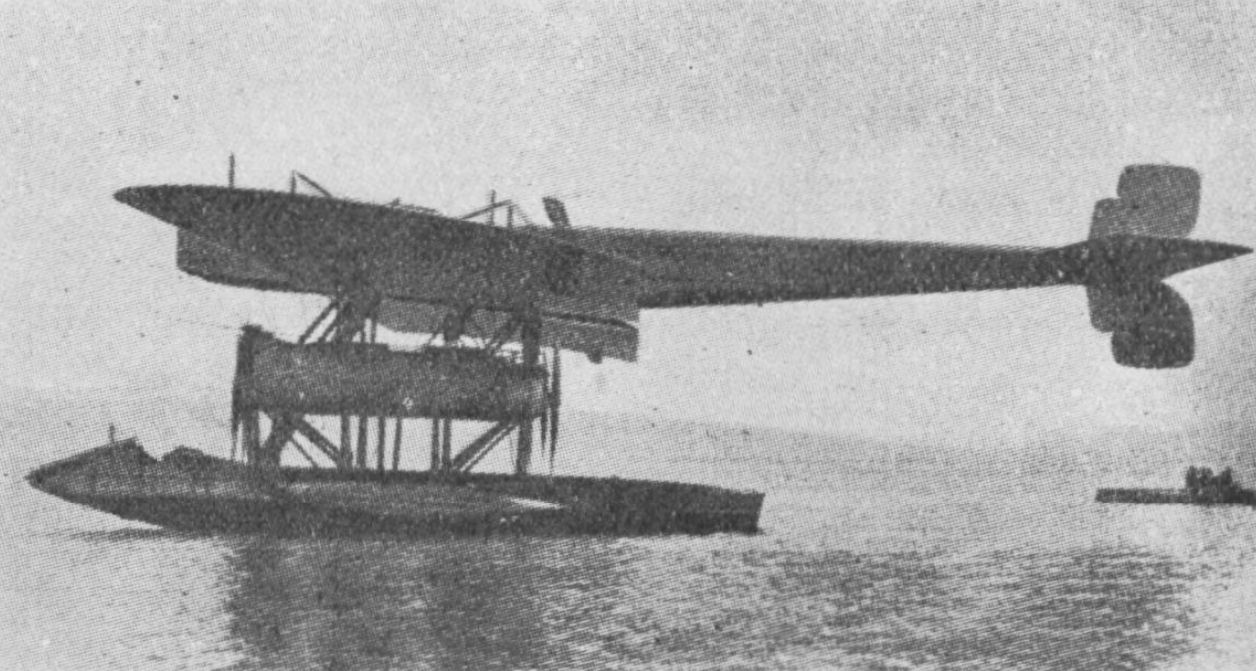

General information
- Type: Patrol flying boat
- National origin: Germany
- Manufacturer: Zeppelin-Lindau
- Designer: Claudius Dornier
- Status: scrapped
- Primary user: Kaiserliche Marine
- Number built: 1

History
- First flight: 12 October 1918
- Developed from: Zeppelin-Lindau Rs.III

The Zeppelin-Lindau Rs.IV (known incorrectly postwar as the Dornier Rs.IV) was a Riesenflugzeug (Giant aircraft) monoplane all metal flying boat with a stressed skin hull and fuselage developed for the Imperial German Navy to perform long range patrols over the North Sea. It had been developed by Claudius Dornier while working for Zeppelin in the town of Lindau.

== Development ==
Two aircraft were ordered by the German Kaiserliche Marine (Imperial Navy) in January 1918. The first flight was made on 12 October 1918 and was converted shortly thereafter into a passenger aircraft sometime between October 1918, following damage sustained during its first flight, and June 1919. When it was modified the pilot's position was moved to the hull instead of in the overhead fuselage in 1919. The sole completed example was scrapped on 17 April 1920 on orders from the Military Inter-Allied Commission of Control, after a detailed examination of its construction had been made; the second example was never completed.

== Design ==
Its design was based on the previous Rs.III, differing primarily in having a narrower hull fitted with sponsons and stressed skin structure, with some minor tidying of the design. It was a braced parasol monoplane with the fuselage mounted on the wing above both engine nacelles and hull. The four engines were mounted in push-pull pairs in nacelles large enough to allow in flight access (a requirement of the original Riesenflugzeug giant aircraft type specification by IdFlieg in 1915) between the hull and the wing. These were staggered to allow propeller disks to overlap slightly so as to reduce adverse yaw when an engine was not running. It had the distinction of being first seaplane to have an all-metal stressed skin hull, and the first seaplane to be fitted with Dornier's patented sponsons.

== Operators ==
German Empire
Kaiserliche Marine - evaluation only

== Specifications ==
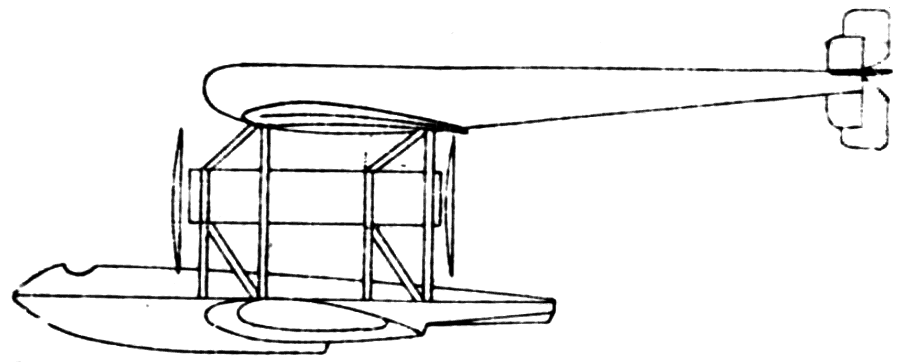
Zeppelin-Lindau Rs.IV profile drawing from L'Aerophile, August 1921

Data from The German Giants

General characteristics

- Crew: 5
- Capacity: (20 passengers in the commercial version)
- Length: 22.7 m (74 ft 6 in) overall
- Hull length: 14.2 m (46 ft 7 in)
- Hull beam: 3.65 m (12 ft 0 in)
- Sponson width: 8 m (26 ft 3 in)
- Wingspan: 37.0 m (121 ft 5 in)
- Height: 8.37 m (27 ft 6 in)
- Wing area: 226 m^{2} (2,430 sq ft)
- Empty weight: 7,237 kg (15,955 lb)
- Gross weight: 10,600 kg (23,369 lb)
- Fuel capacity: 3,000 L (790 US gal; 660 imp gal)
- Powerplant: 4 × Maybach Mb.IVa 6 cylinder liquid cooled inline mounted as tandem pairs, 183 kW (245 hp) each
- Propellers: 4-bladed wooden fixed pitch propellers, 3.1 m (10 ft 2 in) diameter

Performance

- Maximum speed: 138 km/h (86 mph, 75 kn)
- Minimum control speed: 90 km/h (56 mph, 49 kn)
- Endurance: 10 hours
- Time to altitude:
  - 400 to 800 m (1,300 to 2,600 ft) – 14 minutes
  - 400 to 1,000 m (1,300 to 3,300 ft) – 22 minutes
  - 400 to 1,400 m (1,300 to 4,600 ft) – 36.4 minutes
  - 400 to 2,000 m (1,300 to 6,600 ft) – 53.5 minutes
- Wing loading: 46.5 kg/m^{2} (9.5 lb/sq ft)

== See also ==
Related development

- Dornier Gs.I
- Dornier Wal

Related lists

- List of flying boats and floatplanes
- List of large aircraft
- Idflieg aircraft designation system
- List of military aircraft of the Central Powers in World War I
- List of military aircraft of Germany by manufacturer
