= Centralne Warsztaty Lotnicze =

Polish aircraft manufacturer

Centralne Warsztaty Lotnicze (Central Aviation Workshops, CWL) was the Polish state-owned aircraft repair works and manufacturer in Warsaw, active between 1918 and 1928. The workshops were created on 20 November 1918, just after Poland had regained independence after World War I and Warsaw was liberated from German occupation. They were located in Warsaw at the fringe of the airport in Mokotów at 2a Puławska Street. Initially its main task were repairs of engines and aircraft. It also produced aircraft under French licence in the 1920s:

- Hanriot HD.14 (as H-28, 125 built in 1925-1926).
- SPAD 61

Some aircraft were designed by engineers working for CWL, but none entered production.

Selected aircraft designed in CWL:

- CWL WZ.X
- D1 Cykacz
- ST-3

In early 1920s, CWL was renamed Warsztaty Centralnych Zakładów Lotniczych (Workshops of the Central Aviation Works). In 1928 CWL was transformed into the Państwowe Zakłady Lotnicze, soon to become the largest Polish aircraft manufacturer.
