= Z I (army tactical No.) =

LZ 15 (Z I Ersatz)

General information
- Type: Rigid reconnaissance/bomber airship
- National origin: German Empire
- Manufacturer: Luftschiffbau Zeppelin
- Status: Destroyed during emergency landing due to adverse weather
- Primary user: Imperial German Army
- Number built: 1

History
- First flight: 16 January 1913
- Retired: 19 March 1913

The Z I Ersatz, military designation of Zeppelin LZ 15, was a rigid airship built by Luftschiffbau Zeppelin in Friedrichshafen, Germany, in the early 1910s for military purposes.

== Design and development ==
The LZ 15 was constructed at the Zeppelin works in Friedrichshafen and made its first flight on January 16, 1913. It was taken over by the Imperial German Army and given the registration Z I Ersatz, replacing an earlier Z I airship that had been retired due to obsolescence.

The airship measured 142 meters in length and 14.9 meters in diameter. It featured 16 hydrogen gas cells and had a crew of 20 men.

Propulsion was provided by three Maybach B-Y engines, each a 6-cylinder inline, liquid-cooled engine producing 165 horsepower. The engines powered two-bladed propellers at the front and a four-bladed propeller at the rear.

== Operational history ==
The Z I Ersatz was stationed at Baden-Oos and completed a total of 33 flights. On March 19, 1913, after a 20-hour flight, the airship was unable to return to Baden-Oos due to strong headwinds and was forced to make an emergency landing near Karlsruhe because of fuel exhaustion.

Captain (Hauptmann) Horn managed to land safely at the military training ground around 15:30. However, at about 17:00, strong winds pushed the moored nose of the airship into the ground with such force that the structure ruptured. The crew from Telegraph Battalion No. 4 and the airship team evacuated safely without injuries. The engines and instruments were salvaged, but the rest of the airship was destroyed.

== Operators ==
- German Empire Imperial German Army
