= L 8 =

LZ 33 / L 8

General information
- Type: Reconnaissance/bomber airship
- Manufacturer: German Empire Luftschiffbau Zeppelin
- Status: Lost on 5 March 1915
- Primary user: German Empire Kaiserliche Marine

History
- Introduction date: 22 December 1914
- First flight: 14 March 1913

L 8 (factory no. LZ 33) by the Imperial German Navy (Kaiserliche Marine), was a rigid airship built in Germany by Luftschiffbau Zeppelin in the 1910s for military use. The airship was lost during its 22nd mission on 5 March 1915 after it was fired upon by Belgian machine guns and artillery.

== Design and development ==
LZ 33 (L 8) was constructed at Luftschiffbau Zeppelin's facilities in Friedrichshafen and made its maiden flight on 17 December 1914, during the early months of World War I. It was delivered to the Kaiserliche Marine and stationed at Düsseldorf, primarily used for reconnaissance over the Western Front.

Its first commander, as of 22 December 1914, was Kapitänleutnant Konradin Meyer, succeeded in January 1915 by Kapitänleutnant Helmut Beelitz.

== Final mission ==
On 25 February 1915, LZ 33 was dispatched with LZ 37 and LZ 38—Zeppelins based in Zellik and Evere near Brussels—on a bombing mission presumably aimed at London. However, due to strong headwinds over West Flanders, Beelitz aborted the attack. L 8 landed at the new base in Gontrode, East Flanders, on 27 February 1915.

After a few days, Beelitz was informed the army would be taking over the Gontrode base. He loaded the airship with 70 incendiary bombs and launched on the afternoon of 5 March 1915 for a bombing mission toward Essex.

Struggling with navigation, Beelitz broke through cloud cover near Bruges and again at 9:00 near Ostend. While crossing the front near Nieuwpoort at a low altitude (300 m), L 8 was fired upon by Belgian machine guns and artillery, damaging four hydrogen gas cells.

Beelitz aborted the mission and turned back toward Düsseldorf, but the forward and left-rear engines experienced cooling issues. Around 1:00 AM, LZ 33 made an emergency landing in the village of Wommersom near Tienen, east of Brussels in Flemish Brabant.

The airship's rear rudder and gondola became entangled in trees, and the bow struck a row of poplars, throwing some crew members from the forward gondola.

== Casualties and aftermath ==
Accounts of the incident vary including sources stating that all 21 crew members were killed. However out of the 21 crew members, only one—engineer Friedrich Bense likely died from his injuries. (Note: It was reported that Kapitänleutnant Beelitz suffered internal bleeding, ending his airship command career. He later held a position at the Admiralty.)

The crew anchored the damaged airship, but within hours a storm caused further destruction, and L 8 / LZ 33 was dismantled shortly thereafter.

== Operators ==
- German Empire Kaiserliche Marine

== Bibliography ==
- Brooks, Peter W. (1992). Zeppelin Rigid Airship 1893–1940. Smithsonian Institution Press. ISBN 1-56098-228-4.
- Lehmann, Ernst A. (1936). Auf Luftpatrouille und Weltfahrt. Wegweiser-Verlag. pp. 91–92.
- Meyer, Peter (1980). Luftschiffe – Die Geschichte der deutschen Zeppeline. Wehr & Wissen.
- Robinson, Douglas H. (1980). The Zeppelin in Combat: A History of the German Naval Airship Division 1912–1918. University of Washington Press. p. 434. ISBN 0-295-95752-2.
- Wissering, Harry (1922). Zeppelin: The Story of a Great Achievement. Wells and Co.
