= PZL.3 =

General information
- Type: Heavy bomber
- Manufacturer: PZL
- Designer: Władysław Zalewski
- Status: project
- Number built: 0

The PZL.3 was a Polish four-engine monoplane heavy bomber project designed by Władysław Zalewski in 1928-1930 at Państwowe Zakłady Lotnicze.

== Design and development ==
At the time of the formation of PZL the Polish Department of Aeronautics gave the new design office the task of designing a heavy bomber. Zalewski drew heavily on his 1924 WZ-IX Pteranodon bomber and during the winter of 1928-29 the detailed design took shape. He proposed a large low-wing cantilever monoplane with four our 500 hp (370 kW) Bristol Jupiter engines in push-pull tandem nacelles over the wings mounted on pylons. A semi-monocoque stressed skin fuselage was to have its structural members and skinning be in Duralumin. The PZL.3 would have had twin fins and a fixed trousered tail-wheel undercarriage. Armament would have included 3 machine-guns and up to 3,000 kg (6,600 lb) of bombs.

Due to the dire economic situation at the start of the 1930s and the substantial cost and risk, funds for a prototype were not forthcoming and the project was dropped. After this, Zalewski left PZL and subsequently refused to work on Government sponsored projects.

== Specifications ==
Data from Polish Aircraft 1893-1939

General characteristics

- Crew: 5 or 6
- Length: 22 m (72 ft 2 in)
- Wingspan: 36 m (118 ft 1 in)
- Empty weight: 7,500 kg (16,535 lb)
- Gross weight: 12,500 kg (27,558 lb)
- Powerplant: 4 × Bristol Jupiter 9-cyl. Air-cooled radial engines, 373 kW (500 hp) each

Performance

- Maximum speed: 280 km/h (170 mph, 150 kn) at sea level (estimated)
- Wing loading: 73.6 kg/m^{2} (15.1 lb/sq ft)

Armament

- Guns: 3x manually aimed machine-guns in nose, dorsal and ventral positions..
- Bombs: up to 3,000kg of bombs

== See also ==
Aircraft of comparable role, configuration, and era

- Bleriot 195
- Dornier Do P
