= Władysław Zalewski =

Polish engineer

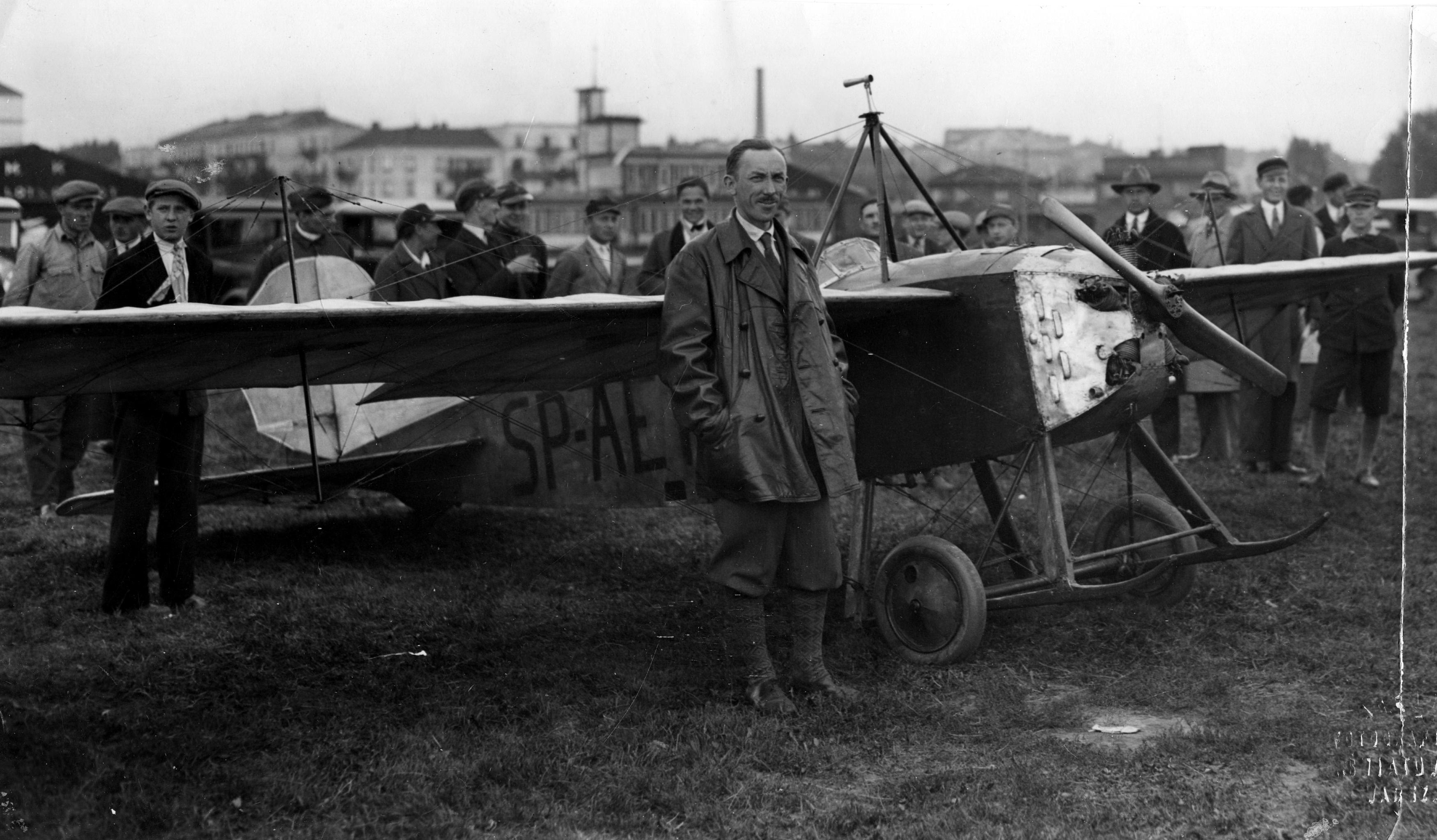
- Władysław Zalewski, with the WZ XI Kogutek (SP-AEF)
- Born: 21 January 1892; Vistula Land, Warsaw
- Died: 25 November 1977 (aged 85); London, England

Władysław Zalewski (21 January 1892 in Warsaw – 25 November 1977 in London) was a Polish aviation engineer, a constructor of aeroplanes and aeroplane engines. Arrested in 1940 by the NKWD he spent 18 months in Soviet camps. He was evacuated to Iraq among Polish soldier of Anders. After 1945 he lived in UK.

In the years of 1908–1913 Zalewski constructed biplane WZ I and its 20 hp engine. In 1912 he constructed with his brother Bolesław monoplane WZ II. During the years of 1915–1916 he built two tetraplanes, in which one was flying on the frontline. During the interwar period Zalewski built biplane WZ VIII (1919), reconnaissance aircraft WZ X (1923–1926), sports plane WZ XI (1927) and the first Polish four-engined heavy bombing plane PZL.3 (1928–1930; built in France as Potez 41) made in PZL.

Zalewski also constructed aircraft engines with manufacturer Avia: WZ-7 (80 hp), WZ-40 (40 hp), WZ Bobo (10 hp), WZ-100 (100 hp).
