= Zalewski W.Z.II =

W.Z.II

General information
- Type: Foot-launched glider
- National origin: Poland
- Manufacturer: Władysław Zalewski
- Designer: Władysław Zalewski
- Number built: 1

History
- First flight: 1912
- Retired: 1913

The Zalewski W.Z.II was a simple glider designed and built in Poland in 1912 by Władysław Zalewski who, after Poland regained its independence in 1918, became a well-known designer of both aircraft and aircraft engines.

== Design and development ==
The Zalewski W.Z.II was the first of Władysław Zalewski's designs to be built and flown, as the completion of the W.Z.I, a powered biplane designed in 1909 when Zalewski was only seventeen, was ended by political events.

It had a two-part wing of rectangular plan, apart from rounded tips. Each half-wing was a fabric covered wooden structure with a main spar at about mid-chord and two auxiliary spars, one of them forming the leading edge. Wing-warping rather than ailerons provided lateral control. The wings were wire-braced from structures both above and below the fuselage frame, two transverse V-struts above, leaning together to form a pyramid and two below, joined to a longitudinal member that acted as a shock absorbing landing skid. The wires reached the outer part of each wing panel via a vertical kingpost mounted on the main spar and extending both above and below the wing.

The very basic fuselage was just a horizontal, cross-braced wooden girder with the pilot strapped to the longerons at mid-chord and sitting on a bicycle seat held below the wings by wires. With legs extended for take-off or landing, his feet reached well below the landing skid. The empennage was of the cruciform type with vertical fins carrying separate rudders, the upper one operated by the same hand-lever that controlled the wing-warping and the lower one by a rudder bar. Another hand-lever controlled the elevator.

The W.Z.II was built in Zalewski's workshop at Milanówek in only three weeks in the spring of 1912 and flight testing soon began. Initially, handling was poor but this was cured by stiffening the fuselage with extra wire bracing and by small changes to the vertical tail. It was launched in that year by two helpers, each with a separate rope and with Zalewski kicking the ground to take off from a hill. These flights only covered about 50 m (160 ft) at a height of 1 m (3.3 ft) in light winds, though distances increased in 1913 when it was launched by four or six assistants.

== Specifications ==
Data from Cynk, 1971

General characteristics

- Crew: One
- Length: 4.8 m (15 ft 9 in)
- Wingspan: 7.5 m (24 ft 7 in)
- Height: 2.0 m (6 ft 7 in)
- Wing area: 9.5 m^{2} (102 sq ft)
- Aspect ratio: 5.9
- Empty weight: 24 kg (53 lb)
- Cruise speed: 40 km/h (25 mph, 22 kn)
- Rate of sink: 1.7 m/s (330 ft/min)
