= Zenith Z-6 =

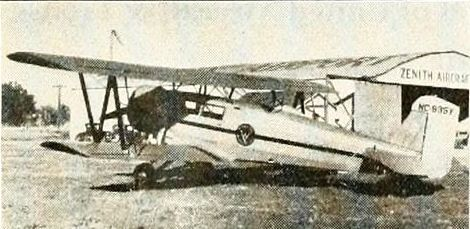
- Zenith Z-6-B

General information
- Type: Six passenger cabin biplane
- National origin: United States
- Manufacturer: Zenith Aircraft Co.
- Designer: Charles Rocheville and Albin Peterson
- Number built: 9

History
- First flight: 1927

The Zenith Z-6 is a single engine biplane U.S. airliner built in the late 1920s. Its cabin, in the fuselage immediately behind its radial engine, holds five or six passengers depending on engine power. It is flown from an open cockpit further aft. Nine were completed and one has been restored to flight.

== Design and development ==
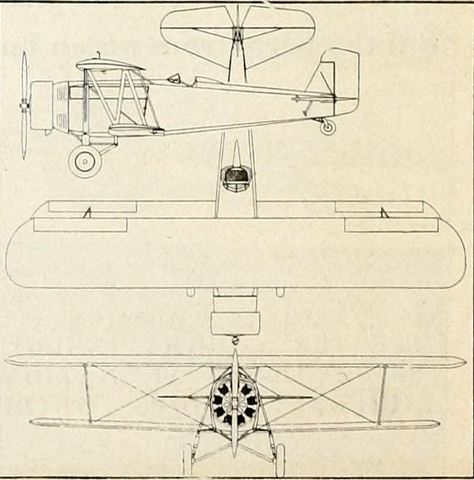

The first Zenith Z-6, a five passenger product of Zenith Aircraft based in Santa Ana, CA, first flew in 1927. After serious commercial confusion with another Zenith Aircraft, based in Uniontown, PA, the west coast company changed its name in 1928 to Albatross Aircraft. Hence both the Z-6 and their later, trimotor Z-12 have been referred to as Zenith Albatross Z-6 and Zenith Albatross Z-12 or Albatross Z-12.

Its unequal span, single bay wings are rectangular in plan out to rounded tips and are mounted with strong stagger. There is dihedral only on the lower wing. The wings have spruce box spars and ribs and are fabric covered. The upper and lower wings are braced together with N-form interplane struts between the spars and four short, near vertical cabane struts hold the upper wing over the fuselage. There are externally interconnected, inset ailerons on both upper and lower wings.

The Z-6 has a fabric-covered steel tube fuselage and tail, with its nine cylinder radial engine in the nose. Two different engines were fitted: the original Z-6 had a 220 hp (160 kW) Wright J-5 and carried five passengers but both the Z-6-A and the Z-6-B have 420 hp (310 kW) Pratt & Whitney Wasp Cs, carrying six passengers. Some engines were uncowled, some had short-chord Townend ring-type cowlings and one Z-6-B had a long chord, NACA cowling. The cabin was between the wings immediately behind the engine and was illuminated with long, continuous windows; the pilot's open cockpit was above and behind it. Its blunted triangular plan tailplane was mounted on top of the fuselage and carried more rounded, separated elevators. A cropped, triangular profile fin carried a blunted rectangular balanced rudder.

The steel tube, fixed landing gear was of the split axle type. The axle's inner ends were hinged on a short longitudinal member held just below the fuselage as were the rear drag struts. Z-6-B users could choose between two shock-absorbing systems with either conventional inward-leaning Bendix oleo struts, extended to the upper fuselage longerons, or Goodyear Airwheels, large, low pressure balloon tyres more suitable for soft strips.

== Operational history ==
Though exact dates are not known, the original Z-6 first flew in 1927, the Z-6-A in 1928 and the Z-6-B in 1929. The histories of most of the nine examples built are not known but one Z-6-A was used by Bennett Air Lines in the Idaho region. It was later fitted with a fibreglass hopper for crop dusting then restored and is the only Z-6 still flying. It is part of the collection of the Maryland Heights-based Historic Aircraft Restoration Museum. The other Z-6-A was later fitted with a supercharged 450 hp (340 kW) Pratt & Whitney Wasp SC.

== Variants ==
Data from Aerofiles:Zenith

Z-6
220 hp (160 kW) Wright J-5. Span 38 ft 5 in (11.71 m)
Z-6-A
420 hp (310 kW) Pratt & Whitney Wasp C. Span 47 ft 6 in (14.48 m)
Z-6-B
420 hp (310 kW) Pratt & Whitney Wasp C. Span 41 ft 6 in (12.65 m)

== Specifications (Zenith Z-6-B) ==
Data from Aero Digest, April 1931

General characteristics

- Crew: one
- Capacity: six passengers
- Length: 30 ft 10 in (9.40 m)
- Upper wingspan: 41 ft 6 in (12.65 m)
- Lower wingspan: 32 ft (9.8 m)
- Wing area: 430 sq ft (40 m^{2}) including ailerons
- Empty weight: 1,918 lb (870 kg)
- Gross weight: 4,763 lb (2,160 kg)
- Fuel capacity: 98 US gal (82 imp gal; 370 L)
- Powerplant: 1 × Pratt & Whitney Wasp C 9 cylinder radial, 420 hp (310 kW)
- Propellers: 2-bladed Hamilton Standard

Performance

- Maximum speed: 150 mph (240 km/h, 130 kn)
- Cruise speed: 125 mph (201 km/h, 109 kn)
- Stall speed: 58 mph (93 km/h, 50 kn)
- Endurance: 5 hr
- Service ceiling: 19,100 ft (5,800 m)
- Rate of climb: 1,130 ft/min (5.7 m/s) initial
