= Zeppelin-Lindau CL.II =

German single-engine reconnaissance biplane

Zeppelin-Lindau CL.I & CL.II
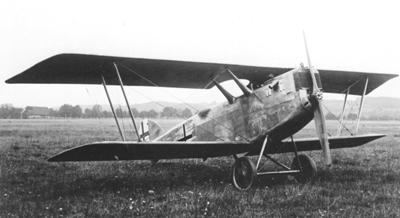

General information
- Type: Reconnaissance
- Manufacturer: Zeppelin-Lindau
- Designer: Claude Dornier
- Status: Abandoned prototype
- Primary user: Luftstreitkräfte
- Number built: 1

History
- First flight: 3 November 1917 (CL.I) and 17 August 1918 (CL.II)

The Zeppelin-Lindau CL.II was a German single-engine two-seat biplane with an all metal structure, built by Zeppelin-Lindau during World War I.

== Design ==
The CL.I was an all-metal single-bay wire-braced biplane, with a stressed skin fuselage, and fabric covered flying surfaces and represented an intermediate step which would lead to the similar but smaller and more refined D.I.

== Development ==
Following the failure of the CL.I to reach the specified altitude of 5,000 m (16,000 ft), and its crash in February 1918 at Berlin Adlershof, the CL.Ia was built with a number of changes, which resulted in it being re-designated as the CL.II. The CL.II had the chord of the top wings increased by 100 mm (3.9 in) and the top wing was raised, increasing the height from 2.835 to 2.95 m (9 ft 3.6 in to 9 ft 8.1 in), while the rudder was redesigned to resolve the sole complaint from the test pilot. The radiator in the CL.I had been located between the wing spars in the upper wing, offset to the pilot's right, however as the plumbing obstructed the pilot's view, and the radiator reduced the efficiency of the wings, it was relocated to the nose of the aircraft.

With the Zeppelin-Lindau CS.I monoplane and Zeppelin-Lindau D.I showing more promise, development of the CL.II was abandoned and the last test flight was made on 14 September 1918.

== Specifications ==
Data from Cross & Cockade

General characteristics

- Crew: Two
- Length: 7.46 m (24 ft 6 in)
- Upper wingspan: 10.5 m (34 ft 5 in)
- Lower wingspan: 9.0 m (29 ft 6 in)
- Height: 2.95 m (9 ft 8 in)
- Wing area: 15.84 m^{2} (170.5 sq ft)
- Empty weight: 727 kg (1,603 lb) Approximate, based on CL.I
- Gross weight: 1,067 kg (2,352 lb) Approximate, based on CL.I
- Fuel capacity: 130 L (29 imp gal; 34 US gal)
- Oil capacity: 14 L (3.7 US gal; 3.1 imp gal)
- Powerplant: 1 × Mercedes D.IIIa 6-cylinder inline water-cooled piston engine, 120 kW (160 hp)
- Propellers: 2-bladed fixed-pitch wooden propeller (Note: 10 different types of propellers were used including Axial, LZ, Wolf and Bechstein), 2.8 m (9 ft 2 in) diameter

Performance

- Endurance: 128 minutes longest test flight, full endurance likely 2 hours.
- Service ceiling: 5,200 m (17,100 ft) maximum altitude reached during test flights

Armament

- Guns: 1 × trainable 7.92 mm (0.312 in) Parabellum MG14 machine gun in observer's cockpit and 1 × fixed forward-firing 7.92 mm (0.312 in) LMG 08/15.
