= Zeppelin-Lindau V I =

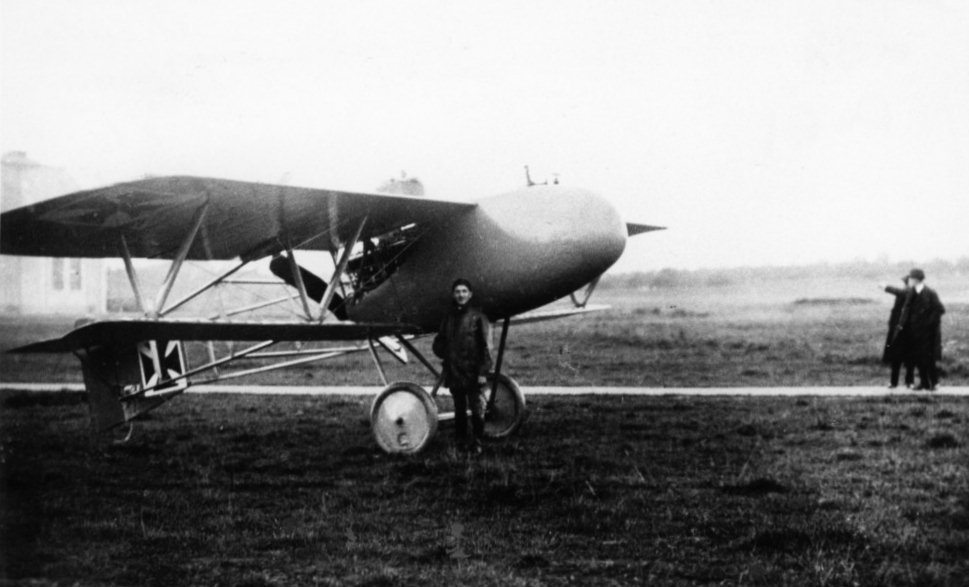

General information
- National origin: Germany
- Manufacturer: Zeppelin-Werke Lindau GmbH
- Designer: Claude Dornier

History
- First flight: November 1916

The Zeppelin-Lindau V I was a metal-framed, pusher configuration, German sesquiplane, designed by Claude Dornier. It flew on 13 November 1916 and crashed on the first flight.

== Design and development ==
It was designed by Claude Dornier, then with Zeppelin-Werke Lindau GmbH and first flew on November 13, 1916. It was a single seat experimental test aircraft for Abteilung Dornier.

The V I was a two bay sesquiplane, its lower wing both shorter and narrower than the upper one. Both had roughly rectangular plans, though the upper tips were rounded. Two steel tube, V-form interplane struts braced the upper and lower wing spars together across an unusually small interplane gap. The wings had Dornier's preferred metal spars and ribs and were fabric covered.

A pusher configuration aircraft, the V I was powered by a 160 hp (120 kW) Maybach Mb.III engine placed, partially exposed, at the rear of the forward fuselage. This was a smooth ovoid aluminium sheet structure and contained the cockpit just behind the nose. Behind the wing trailing edges the fuselage was an uncovered steel tube structure, rectangular in cross-section. Its upper and lower tailbooms were mounted on the wings at the top and bottom of the inner interplane struts, far enough apart to provide clearance for the propeller. It narrowed aft to the tail, which, like the wings, had surfaces with fabric covering over metal structures. A trapezoidal fin was mounted between the converging fuselage members, where the final vertical tube served as the rudder post and carried a rectangular rudder. The horizontal tail was mounted on the upper fuselage, braced with V-struts to the lower booms ahead of the rudder post. An SKF latticed radiator was fixed above the upper wing.

Its undercarriage was fixed and conventional, with mainwheels on a single axle supported at each end by a V-strut to the lower fuselage. There was a small tailskid below the rudder post.

The pusher layout was probably influenced by the success of the British D.H.2, and F.E.2b fighters which, with the French Nieuport 11 sesquiplane had helped to attain aerial superiority on the Western Front in the summer of 1916.

== Operational history ==
The machine was built at Seemoos, Friedrichshafen and was transported to Loewental airfield and stored in readiness for flight trials. Ground-based taxiing trials indicated that it was top heavy, where it nosed over on the ground on at least once. On 13 November when the initial flight was to take place, company pilot Schroeter did not turn up so Oblt. Riechsffreiherr Hans Haller von Hallerstein volunteered instead. The aircraft lifted off the ground and flew on an undulating path before climbing almost vertically and then diving and crashing into the ground. Kallerstein was killed and the aircraft was so badly damaged that it was not repaired.

== Specifications ==
Data from German Aircraft of the First World War

General characteristics

- Crew: 1
- Upper wingspan: 10.55 m (34 ft 7 in)
- Powerplant: 1 × Maybach Mb III water-cooled 6-cylinder inline, 120 kW (160 hp)
- Propellers: 2-bladed
