= Zlokazov ARK-Z-1 =

General information
- Type: Transport
- National origin: USSR
- Manufacturer: OKO (Kiev)
- Designer: Aleksandr Ivanovich Zlokazov
- Number built: 1

History
- First flight: Spring 1935
- Developed from: PS-4 (Junkers W33)

The ARK-Z-1, was a single-engined transport aircraft designed and produced in the USSR from 1933.

== Development ==
Zlokazov formed a small design bureau, at the GVF repair plant at Irkutsk, to create a transport aircraft for use in the Arctic regions. The aircraft was based on the PS-4, which was a Soviet built Junkers W33, with an enclosed, heated, cockpit and cabin for ten passengers or 880 kg of cargo loaded through a double set of doors on the port fuselage side. The undercarriage introduced oleo-pneumatic shock absorbers with large low-pressure tyres which could be exchanged for skis when necessary, and a good field performance was ensured through use of powered landing flaps. The ARK-Z-1 satisfactorily completed the factory flight test programme and the aircraft was then flown to Moscow for testing by the NII GVF during the Autumn of 1935. Production was not pursued due to the obsolescent structure.

== Specifications (ARK-Z-1) ==
Data from Gunston, Bill. "Encyclopaedia of Russian Aircraft 1875-1995". London:Osprey. 1995. ISBN 1-85532-405-9

General characteristics

- Crew: 2
- Capacity: 10 pax / 880kg cargo
- Length: 15 m (49 ft 2.5 in)
- Wingspan: 21.8 m (71 ft 6.25 in)
- Wing area: 70.2 m^{2} (755.6 sq ft)
- Empty weight: 3,200 kg (7,055 lb)
- Gross weight: 5,150 kg (11,354 lb)
- Powerplant: 1 × M-34R , 611.5 kW (820 hp)

Performance

- Maximum speed: 240 km/h (149 mph, 129 kn)
- Service ceiling: 3,800 m (12,500 ft)
- Rate of climb: 2.5 m/s (492 ft/min)

== See also ==
Aircraft of comparable role, configuration, and era

- Junkers W33
