= Zero Gravity Paragliders =

South Korean aircraft manufacturer

- Company type: Brand
- Industry: Aerospace
- Founded: 2002
- Founder: Mansoo Chae
- Defunct: circa 2008
- Headquarters: Seoul, South Korea
- Products: Paragliders and parachutes
- Parent: JM International Company Limited

Zero Gravity Paragliders was a South Korean aircraft manufacturer based in Seoul and founded by Mansoo Chae. The company specialized in the design and manufacture of ready-to-fly paragliders and parachutes.

The company was founded in 2002 and seems to have gone out of business by 2008.

Chae started the Zero Gravity brand as part of JM International Company Limited. Chae had previously been at Edel Paragliders, which was based in Gwangju, South Korea, before starting his own paraglider manufacturing operation.

Zero Gravity also made military jump parachutes.

The company's first two paraglider designs were the Flow beginner glider and the Windstar intermediate. In 2003 the company was developing a two-place glider for flight training and also a performance wing.

== Aircraft ==
Summary of aircraft built by Zero Gravity:

- Zero Gravity Flow
- Zero Gravity Windstar
