= Zeferu K-570 =

Ethiopian homemade airplane

The Zeferu K-570 is an aeroplane made from scratch by Ethiopian Asmelash Zeferu, who plans to become the first East African to fly an indigenously designed aircraft.

== Aircraft ==
The Zeferu K-570A is a two-seat parasol-wing monoplane of conventional layout and wooden frame construction. The wing is of straight, untapered configuration and is strut-braced. The fixed, fuselage-mounted tailwheel undercarriage is derived from a Suzuki motorcycle.

Power was initially provided by a Volkswagen engine taken from a Volkswagen Beetle motor car. This horizontally opposed four-cylinder engine has a capacity of 1,285 cc and delivers 40 hp at 3,000 rpm. The engine has since been replaced by a 78 hp model taken from a Volkswagen Transporter.

Design altitude in cruise is 10 metres (33 ft).

== History ==
Zeferu left Alemaya University campus to join the Ethiopian Airlines Aviation Academy, but his application to become a pilot was refused. So in 2001, he decided to build his own plane in order to fulfill his lifelong dream of flight.

The Zeferu K-570A aeroplane failed to fly on its first outing, on 15 June 2015, when the propeller disintegrated.

Following an introduction to René Bubberman, a member of the Dutch Experimental Aircraft Association (NVAV), Zeferu has been offered a scholarship to study aeronautics at the Inholland University of Applied Sciences.
