= CWL WZ.X =

Polish aircraft

WZ.X
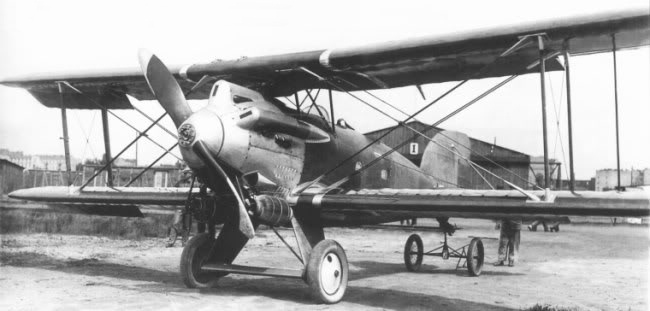
- CWL WZ.X prototype, 1926

General information
- Type: Reconnaissance aircraft
- Manufacturer: CWL
- Primary user: Polish Air Force
- Number built: 4

History
- Manufactured: 1926-1927
- Introduction date: 1928
- First flight: August 1926
- Retired: 1939

The WZ.X was the Polish reconnaissance aircraft designed in the mid-1920s and manufactured in the Centralne Warsztaty Lotnicze (CWL) - Central Aviation Workshops in Warsaw. It was the first combat aircraft of own design built in Poland, in a small series.

== Development ==
The aircraft was designed by Władysław Zalewski, as his tenth design (Zalewski had already constructed aircraft for the Russian Air Force during the World War I). Work started in 1923, and the first prototype was flown in August 1926. Another airframe was built for static trials. Flight trials were successful: its performance was at least as good as the Breguet 19, and better than the Potez 25. However, maintenance was more difficult.

In 1927, two pre-series aircraft were built (designated WZ.X/II, WZ.X/III), powered by 340 kW (450 hp) Lorraine-Dietrich 12Eb used by the prototype, with a fourth (WZ.X/IV) powered by a 400 kW (530 hp) Gnome et Rhône 9A Jupiter radial engine with four-blade propeller.

The WZ.X did not enter serial production, because Poland had already bought many Breguet 19 aircraft from France, and started production under licence of the Potez 25 of the same class. Three WZ.Xs were given to aviation schools, where one or two survived in Dęblin until 1939.

== Description ==
Wooden construction braced biplane, conventional in layout. A fuselage was semi-monocoque, elliptical in cross-section, plywood-covered. Rectangular two-spar wings, covered with canvas and plywood (in front), of equal span, slightly staggered. Ailerons on both wings, joined with struts. Strutted empennage, covered with plywood (stabilizers) and canvas (rudder and elevators). Crew of two, sitting in tandem in open cockpits, the first with a windshield. Conventional fixed landing gear, with a rear skid, the main gear with a common axle. Inline engine in front, driving two-blade tractor wooden propeller, with two round Lamblin radiators under the fuselage (in the WZ.X/IV - radial engine, with four-blade propeller and no radiators). Fuel tank in the fuselage.

The pilot had two fixed 7.7 mm Vickers machine guns with an interrupter gear, the observer had twin 7.7 mm Lewis machine guns on a ring mounting. Bomb load: unknown.

== Variants ==
WZ.X/I
First prototype powered by a 340 kW (450 hp) Lorraine-Dietrich 12Eb
WZ.X/II
Pre-series aircraft essentially similar to the WZ.X/I
WZ.X/III
Pre-series aircraft essentially similar to the WZ.X/I
WZ.X/IV
Pre-series aircraft powered by a 400 kW (530 hp) Gnome et Rhône 9A Jupiter driving a four-bladed propeller

== Specifications (WX.X/I) ==
Data from Jane's all the World's Aircraft 1928, Polskie konstrukcje lotnicze 1893-1939, Polish Aircraft 1893–1939

General characteristics

- Crew: 2
- Length: 8.21 m (26 ft 11 in)
- Wingspan: 11.31 m (37 ft 1 in)
- Height: 3.07 m (10 ft 1 in)
- Wing area: 33.2 m^{2} (357 sq ft)
- Airfoil: St. Cyr
- Empty weight: 1,246 kg (2,747 lb)
- Gross weight: 1,915 kg (4,222 lb)
- Powerplant: 1 × Lorraine-Dietrich 12Eb W-12 water-cooled piston engine, 340 kW (450 hp)
- Propellers: 2-bladed fixed-pitch wooden propeller

Performance

- Maximum speed: 206 km/h (128 mph, 111 kn) fully loaded; 220 km/h (140 mph; 120 kn) lightly loaded
- Range: 800 km (500 mi, 430 nmi)
- Service ceiling: 6,325 m (20,751 ft)
- Rate of climb: 5.5 m/s (1,080 ft/min)
- Wing loading: 57.7 kg/m^{2} (11.8 lb/sq ft)
- Power/mass: 1,749 kW/kg (01,064 hp/lb)

Armament

- Guns:

2x fixed front-firing 7.7 mm (0.303 in) Vickers machine-guns
2x movable 7.7 mm (0.303 in) Lewis machine-guns

- Bombs: light bombs

== See also ==
- WZ-III - WZ-IV - CWL WZ-VIII - CWL WZ-IX

Aircraft of comparable role, configuration, and era Breguet 19 - Potez 15 - Potez 25 - Aero A.32
