= Zalewski W.Z.XII Kogutek II =

Polish single-seat sports aircraft

W.Z.XII Kogutek II
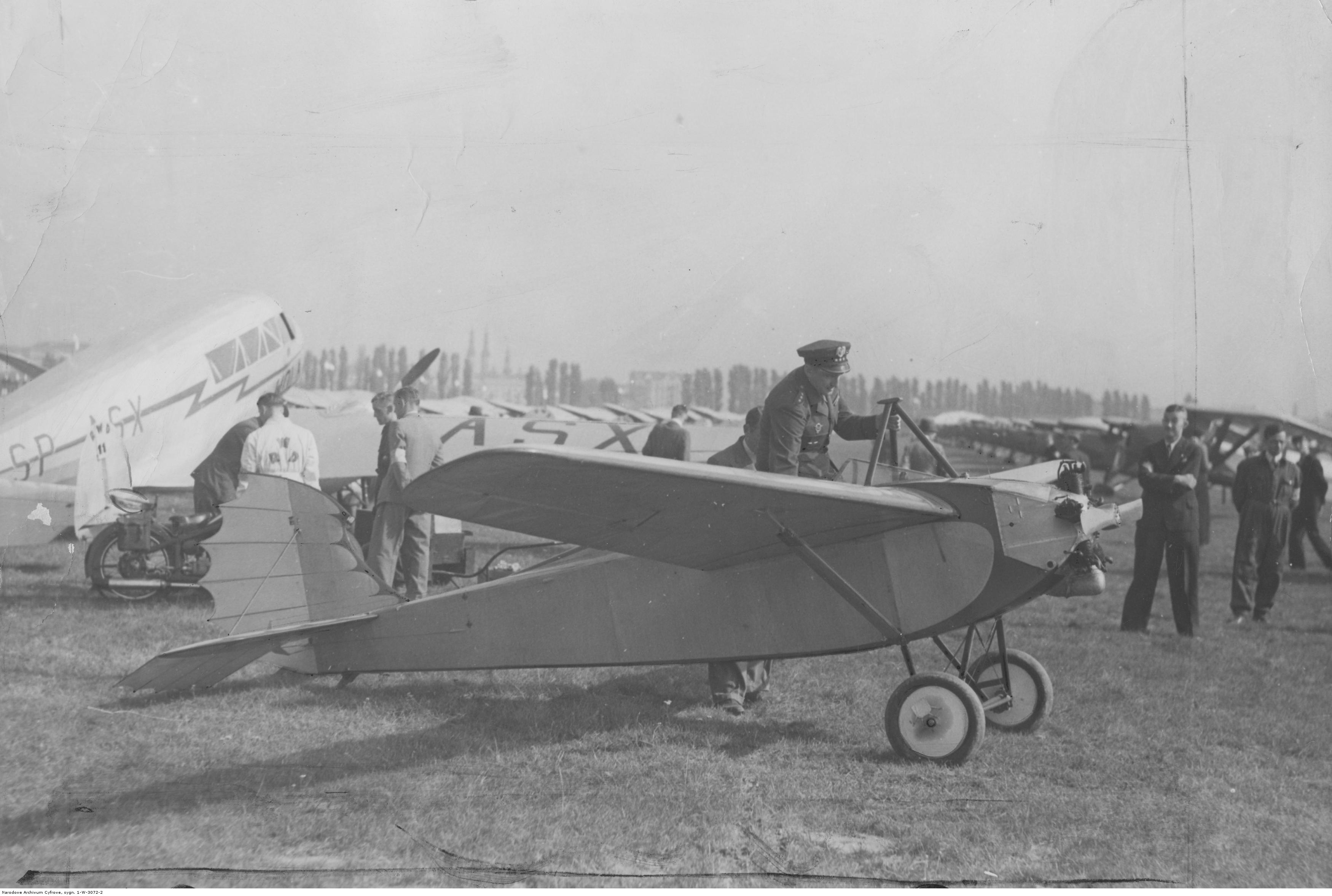
- Kogutek II prototype

General information
- Type: Single seat sports aircraft
- National origin: Poland
- Designer: Władyslaw Zalewski

History
- First flight: July 1937

The Zalewski W.Z.XII Kogutek II was a Polish single-seat sports aircraft. Construction was started in 1932 but not completed and flown until 1937. Only one was built.

== Design and development ==
The W.Z.XII succeeded Władyslaw Zalewski's W.Z.XI. Both were single-seat sports monoplanes but the W.Z.XII was a completely new and more modern design, begun in 1932. Design work progressed slowly in Zalewski's spare time and was not completed until 1935. Building was delayed until LOPP provided a grant which covered about 25% of the total cost but gave them a half share in the airframe. It was built in Zalewski's workshop at the Warsaw-Okecie airfield and in July 1937 he took it on its first flight.

The W.Z.XII was an all-wood aircraft with a shoulder wing of much higher aspect ratio than that of its predecessor. Its plywood-covered, semi-thick wing was straight-tapered out to semi-elliptical tips and built around a central box-spar, a D-box leading edge and an auxiliary rear spar. The wing was mounted on the upper fuselage with marked dihedral and braced from the lower fuselage longeron with a single steel tube strut to the main spar on each side.

The prototype was powered by the same WZ.18 engine used on the Zalewski W.Z.XI. This was a 13 kW (18 hp) five cylinder radial which Zalewski had designed and built in 1923 and was mounted with its cylinders exposed for cooling. Behind the engine the fuselage was flat-sided apart from rounded upper decking and was ply-covered all over. There was an open cockpit over mid-wing, with a long, sloping windscreen and two small triangular windows in the wing roots, one on each side, to give the pilot a downward view. The empennage of the W.Z.XII was conventional and the vertical surfaces were similar to those of the W.Z.XI. The fin had a kinked leading edge and the rudder was large and roughly semi-circular. The tailplane, braced to the fin, was mounted on top of the fuselage. The fixed tail surfaces were ply-covered and the control surfaces were fabric covered.

For road transport, the horizontal tail folded upwards against the fin and the wings folded back along the fuselage sides.

The prototype had simple, fixed landing gear, with wheels on a single axle which was mounted via rubber cord shock absorbers to the vertices of a pair of V-struts, one from each side of the lower fuselage. Production aircraft, had they been built, would have had more refined gear, with a split axle and aerodynamic drag reduced with streamlining.

It was intended that there should be two production versions, the fully aerobatic W.Z.XIIa powered by a 30–33 kW (40–44 hp) Zalewski W.Z.40 and the W.Z.XIIb powered by a 19–21 kW (25–28 hp) Zalewski W.Z.25. Both these engines, like the W.Z.18, were five-cylinder radials. The more powerful W.Z.40 had passed its manufacturer's tests and the reinforced wing of the W.Z.XIIa was being built by L.W.S. before Germany invaded Poland in the autumn of 1939.

== Variants ==
- W.Z.XII: Prototype with W.Z.18 engine. One built.
- W.Z.XIIa: Fully aerobatic production version with W.Z.40 engine. Construction begun but none completed.
- W.Z.XIIb: Lower-powered production version with W.Z.25 engine. Unbuilt.
- W.Z.XIV Kogutek III: Proposed tandem two seat cabin version with 37 kW (50 hp) W.Z.50 engine. Unbuilt.

== Specifications (Prototype) ==
Data from J. Cynk, 1971

General characteristics

- Crew: One
- Length: 4.9 m (16 ft 1 in)
- Wingspan: 8 m (26 ft 3 in)
- Height: 1.6 m (5 ft 3 in)
- Wing area: 6.5 m^{2} (70 sq ft)
- Aspect ratio: 9.8
- Empty weight: 110 kg (243 lb)
- Gross weight: 220 kg (485 lb)
- Fuel capacity: 40 L (8.8 imp gal; 11 US gal)
- Powerplant: 1 × Zalewski W.Z.18 5-cylinder radial, 13 kW (18 hp)
- Propellers: 2-bladed Zalewski, 1.4 m (4 ft 7 in) diameter

Performance

- Maximum speed: 98 km/h (61 mph, 53 kn)
- Cruise speed: 90 km/h (56 mph, 49 kn)
- Stall speed: 58 km/h (36 mph, 31 kn) minimum speed
- Range: 800 km (500 mi, 430 nmi)
- Service ceiling: 3,000 m (9,800 ft)
- Time to altitude: 13.5 min to 1,000 m (3,300 ft)
