= Luftschiffbau Zeppelin =

Airship manufacturer in Germany

Coordinates: 47°40′27″N 9°30′26″E

Zeppelin Luftschifftechnik GmbH & Co. KG
- Type: GmbH & Co. KG
- Industry: manufacture of air and spacecraft and related machinery vehicle construction
- Founded: 1908; 118 years ago
- Founder: Ferdinand von Zeppelin
- Key people: Peter Gerstmann; Chairman
- Number of employees: 10,458 (2021)
- Website: www.zeppelinflug.de

ZLT Zeppelin Luftschifftechnik GmbH & Co. KG is a German aircraft manufacturing company. It is perhaps best known for its leading role in the design and manufacture of rigid airships, commonly referred to as Zeppelins due to the company's prominence. The name 'Luftschiffbau' is a German word meaning building of airships.

The company was founded by Count Ferdinand von Zeppelin in 1908 as a formal entity to continue advancing his pioneering research into rigid airships. Luftschiffbau Zeppelin became the leading manufacturer in the field of large lighter-than-air vehicles; its products were used in both military and civilian capacities. The firm founded DELAG, the world's first airline to use an aircraft in revenue service, in 1909 on the back of public interest and using its own airships. During the First World War, Zeppelins were employed as the first long distance strategic bombers, launching numerous raids upon Belgium, France, and the United Kingdom. Following Count von Zeppelin's death in 1917, control of Luftschiffbau Zeppelin fell to Dr. Hugo Eckener, an enthusiastic proponent of the civil value of airships. However, Germany's zeppelins were claimed by the Allies as war reparations.

The company continued to innovate during the interwar period, constructing the largest rigid airship in history, the LZ 129 Hindenburg, lead ship of the Hindenburg class. However, the company's fortunes soured during the Nazi era, particularly following the high-profile Hindenburg disaster. Its airships were grounded and scrapped in 1940 to produce fixed-wing combat aircraft for Nazi Germany's war machine. During the Second World War, the company became involved in the manufacture of the V2 rocket; its facilities were hit by Allied bombing raids and it all but ceased to exist in the final months of the conflict. During the 1980s, Luftschiffbau Zeppelin GmbH was revived from its residual assets. It has since become a major shareholder in the company ZLT Zeppelin Luftschifftechnik GmbH, which developed and produces the Zeppelin NT, a next generation airship.

== History ==
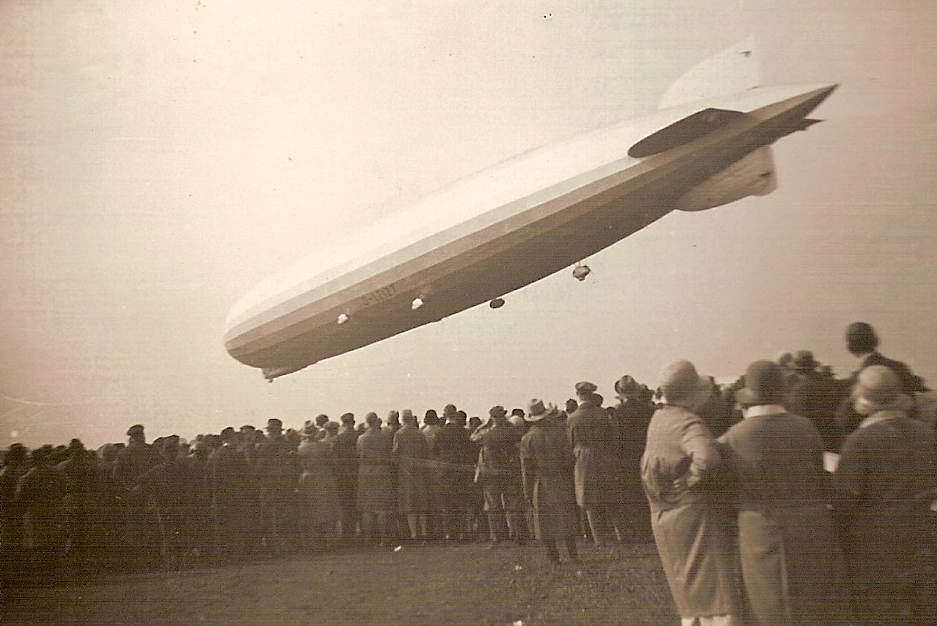
The LZ 127 Graf Zeppelin departing for DELAG, the world's first airline, in 1930

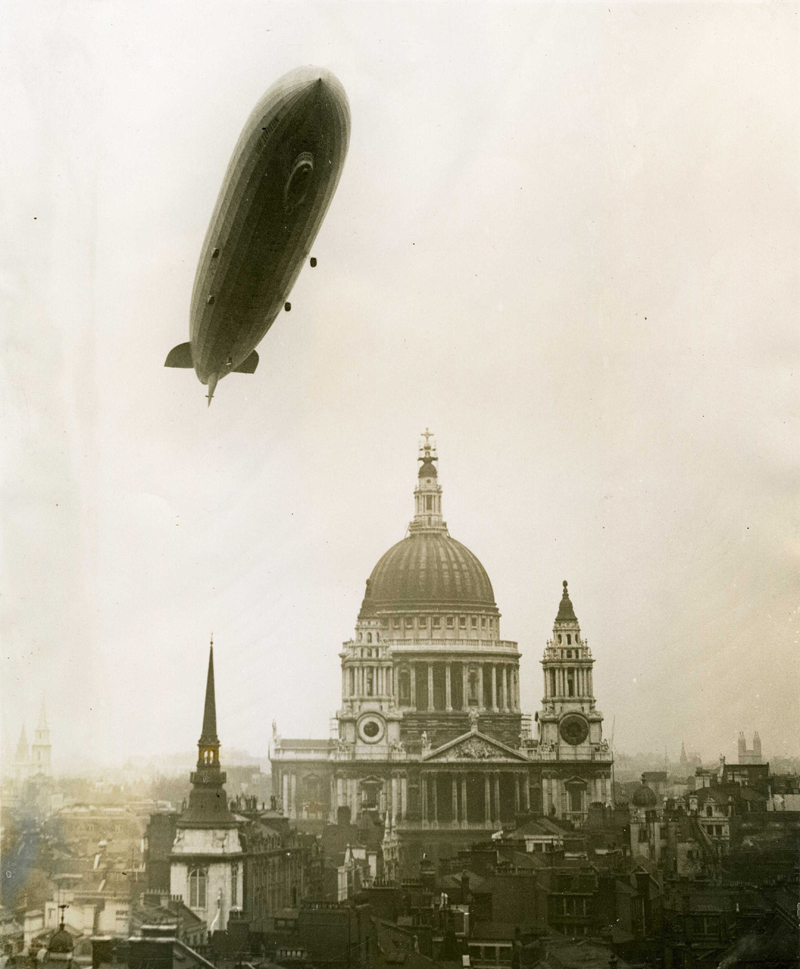
Graf Zeppelin above St. Paul's Cathedral in London in 1930

=== Formative years ===
During 1900, Count von Zeppelin's first airship performed its maiden flight. Initially, his research was being financed by the count himself, as well as by private donations, and even a lottery; public interest in Zeppelin's activities grew with the success of each flight. In 1908, the Zeppelin LZ 4 was destroyed during a high-profile test flight. However, this apparent setback proved fortunate in the long run since its loss caused a flood of public support; the ensuing donation campaign collected over six million German marks, which was used to set up both 'Luftschiffbau Zeppelin GmbH' as well as the Zeppelin Foundation.

Luftschiffbau Zeppelin proceeded to design and manufacture a range of Zeppelin airships, which found use within both the civilian and military sectors. The company played a leading role in the field of large lighter-than-air vehicles, establishing numerous firsts and innovations over the following decades. One such innovation was the founding of DELAG in 1909, the world's first airline to use an aircraft in revenue service. At the time, orders from the German Army were not immediately forthcoming, thus Alfred Colsman, Zeppelin Luftschiffbau's business manager, suggested harnessing the German public's enthusiasm for airships via the establishment of a commercial passenger-carrying company. By July 1914, DELAG's Zeppelins had transported 34,028 passengers on 1,588 commercial flights; the fleet had flown 172,535 kilometres in 3,176 hours.

=== World War One ===
During the First World War, Imperial Germany decided to deploy Zeppelins as long-distance bombers, launching numerous attacks upon Belgium, France, and the United Kingdom. While the direct military effect of these zeppelin raids has been seen as limited, their novelty generated widespread alarm and caused substantial resources to be diverted from the Western Front to address them. At the time, the impact of such raids was overestimated in terms of both the material and psychological effects of the bombing of cities. One inadvertent consequence was the launch of a parliamentary inquiry under Jan Smuts, whose report led to the creation of the Royal Air Force (RAF) on 1 April 1918.

Zeppelin technology improved considerably as a result of the conflict. Luftschiffbau Zeppelin came under government control and new personnel were recruited to cope with the increased demand, including the aerodynamicist Paul Jaray and the stress engineer Karl Arnstein. Many technological advances originated from the firm's competitor, the Mannheim-based Schütte-Lanz company. While their dirigibles were never as successful, Professor Schütte's more scientific approach to airship design led to innovations such as a streamlined hull shape, simpler cruciform fins (replacing the more complicated box-like arrangements of older Zeppelins), individual direct-drive engine cars, anti-aircraft machine-gun positions, and gas ventilation shafts that transferred vented hydrogen to the top of the airship. New production facilities were set up to assemble Zeppelins from components fabricated in Friedrichshafen.

In 1917, Count von Zeppelin died; control of Luftschiffbau Zeppelin fell to Dr. Hugo Eckener, who had long envisioned dirigibles as vessels of peace rather than of war and hoped to quickly resume civilian flights. Despite considerable difficulties, they completed two small passenger airships: LZ 120 Bodensee (scrapped July 1928), which first flew in August 1919 and in the following months transported passengers between Friedrichshafen and Berlin, and sister ship LZ 121 Nordstern (scrapped September 1926), which was intended for use on a regular route to Stockholm.

However, in 1921, the Allied Powers demanded that these airships should be handed over as war reparations as compensation for the dirigibles destroyed by their crews in 1919. Germany was not allowed to construct military aircraft and only airships of less than 28,000 m^{3} (1,000,000 ft^{3}) were permitted. This brought a halt to Zeppelin's plans for airship development, and the company temporarily resorted to the manufacture of aluminium cooking utensils.

=== Interwar and Second World War ===
Between the mid 1920s and 1940, the company worked closely with the Goodyear Tire and Rubber Company to manufacture a pair of Zeppelins in the United States; to cement this relationship, a joint venture company, the Goodyear-Zeppelin Corporation, was created to handle such activities. The first airship to be produced under this initiative, the LZ 126, performed its first flight on 27 August 1924. However, the Goodyear-Zeppelin partnership was terminated following the outbreak of the Second World War. Despite this, the American company continued to produce blimps for several decades under the Goodyear name.

During 1926, restrictions on airship construction were relaxed, but acquiring the necessary funds for Luftschiffbau Zeppelin's next project proved problematic in the difficult economic situation of post–First World War Germany, requiring two years of lobbying and publicity work to secure the realization of Graf Zeppelin, christened in honour of the firm's founder. On 18 September 1928, when the completed Graf Zeppelin flew for the first time. In the following years, it was not only commenced transatlantic commercial passenger flights but performed several record-breaking flights, including a successful circumnavigation of the globe. Luftschiffbau Zeppelin was keen to continue advancing the capabilities of its airships and begun design work on an even larger airship during the late 1920s.

Perhaps the single most famous airship was the LZ 129 Hindenburg, the first of two airships of the Hindenburg class. It was a large commercial passenger-carrying rigid airship, being the longest class of flying machine and the largest airship by envelope volume. Hindenburg was constructed by the company between 1931 and 1936, and performed its maiden test flight from the Zeppelin dockyards at Friedrichshafen on 4 March 1936, with 87 passengers and crew aboard. It subsequently performed propaganda flights around Germany in conjunction with other airships, in addition to transatlantic commercial passenger flights to destinations in both North and South America.

The company's fortunes were greatly influenced by the rise of the Nazis to power in Germany during 1933. On the whole, Nazi Germany placed a greater value on 'heavier than air' aircraft over that of zeppelins due to their military superiority. Despite this, zeppelins were prominently used by the nation for a number of major propaganda campaigns, to great effect. As a consequence of accepting 11 million marks from Goebbels' Ministry of Propaganda and Göring's Air Ministry, the company was effectively divided, with Luftschiffbau Zeppelin making the airships and the Deutsche Zeppelin-Reederei company (affiliated with Lufthansa) operating them. Officially, Hugo Eckener was the head of both entities but, in practice, Ernst Lehmann, who was less opposed to the Nazi regime, ran the latter. As a result of Eckener's criticism of the Nazi regime, Goebbels had ordered his censoring across all forms of public media in 1936.

However, Luftschiffbau Zeppelin lost much of its favour amongst political circles following the Hindenburg disaster in 1937; the event compelled the firm to terminate Zeppelin manufacturing in 1938, while all operations of existing airships was ceased by 1940. In August 1939, the Graf Zeppelin II conducted a reconnaissance flight along Great Britain's coastline in an attempt to determine whether the 100 metre towers erected from Portsmouth to Scapa Flow were used for aircraft radio location. The frames of Graf Zeppelin and Graf Zeppelin II, along with scrap material from Hindenburg, were subsequently scrapped that same year for their materials, which were used to fulfil wartime demands for fixed-wing military aircraft for the Luftwaffe.

During the autumn of 1941, the company accepted contracts to produce elements of the V-2 rocket, specifically propellant tanks and fuselage sections. By 17 August 1942, the Allies had suspected that the Zeppelin Works in Friedrichshafen (as well as the Henschel Raxwerke) were involved in the supply chain of the V-2, and on 25 July 1943, British MP Duncan Sandys reported that Friedrichshafen photos depicted rocket firing sites like Test Stand VII at Peenemünde. During the previous month, Allied bombing during Operation Bellicose had hit the Zeppelin V-2 facility, leading to production being subsequently relocated to the Mittelwerk. During the final months of the conflict, the company effectively ceased to exist, disappearing sometime around 1945.

=== Re-emergence ===
Almost 50 years following its disappearance, the company was regenerated from its residual assets. During 1993, the parent group company of the current Zeppelin maker was re-established, while the operating company producing the current Zeppelins was created in 2001.

The modern development and construction that is embodied by the Zeppelin NT had been financed by a long-standing endowment, which had been initially funded with money left over from the earlier Zeppelin company, that had been under the trusteeship of the Mayor of Friedrichshafen. A stipulation had been placed upon the endowment that limited the use of its funds to the field of airships. Over the many years, the investment value of the endowment grew to a point where it had become viable for the funds to be put to use for the purpose of designing, developing, and constructing of a new generation of Zeppelins. In 1988, the first considerations into the technological and economic feasibility of reviving the Zeppelin industry began; this included examinations of historic Zeppelin documentation as well as current designs for airships. In December 1990, a feasibility study and accompanying market research program found an initial sales potential for around 80 Zeppelin airships for purposes such as tourism, advertising, and scientific research. In mid 1991, the newly formed development team filed several patents on various technologies that would be later used on the subsequent airship, these included propeller arrangements, structure and girder design, and ballonet implementation. In March 1991, a flyable remote control proof of concept model was demonstrated, which is claimed to have revealed excellent flight characteristics from the onset.

In September 1993, the Zeppelin Luftschifftechnik GmbH (ZLT) was founded in Friedrichshafen as a corporate spin-off of the original Zeppelin company to pursue development and production of the new generation of Zeppelins, later known as the Zeppelin NT (New Technology). By spring 1994, preparatory studies for a full-sized prototype were underway. In 1995, the Luftfahrt-Bundesamt, Germany's civil aviation authority, officially recognized ZLT, as a design organisation, and approved new construction regulations for airships. In November 1995, final assembly of the first airship prototype commenced, it was promoted as being the first rigid airship to be produced by the firm since the Second World War. In July 1996, the under-construction prototype of the Zeppelin NT 07 was presented to the public and the media. In September 1997, the prototype performed its maiden flight at Friedrichshafen; piloted by US test pilot Scott Danneker, it flew for a total of 40 minutes.

On 3 May 2011, Goodyear confirmed their intentions to reinstate their historic partnership with Luftschiffbau Zeppelin. Accordingly, Goodyear placed an order for three Zeppelin NT LZ N07-101 models with plans to commence operation in January 2014. The Zeppelin NT is the successor to Goodyear's non-rigid airship, the GZ-20 in Goodyear airship advertising. The first of these airships, referred to as Wingfoot One, was introduced during mid-2014.

== Fixed-wing aircraft ==
World War I (primarily for the Luftstreitkräfte):

- Zeppelin-Staaken L
- Zeppelin-Staaken 8301
- Zeppelin-Staaken VGO.I
- Zeppelin-Staaken VGO.II
- Zeppelin-Staaken VGO.III
- Zeppelin-Staaken R.IV
- Zeppelin-Staaken R.V
- Zeppelin-Staaken R.VI
- Zeppelin-Staaken R.VII
- Zeppelin-Staaken R.XIV
- Zeppelin-Staaken R.XV
- Zeppelin-Staaken R.XVI
- Zeppelin-Friedrichshafen C.I & C.II
- Zeppelin-Lindau D.I
- Zeppelin-Lindau CL.I & CL.II
- Zeppelin-Lindau CS.I
- Zeppelin-Lindau V.I

World War II:

- Fliegende Panzerfaust
- Zeppelin Rammer

== See also ==
- List of Zeppelins
