= Zlin Savage =

Czech light aircraft

Savage
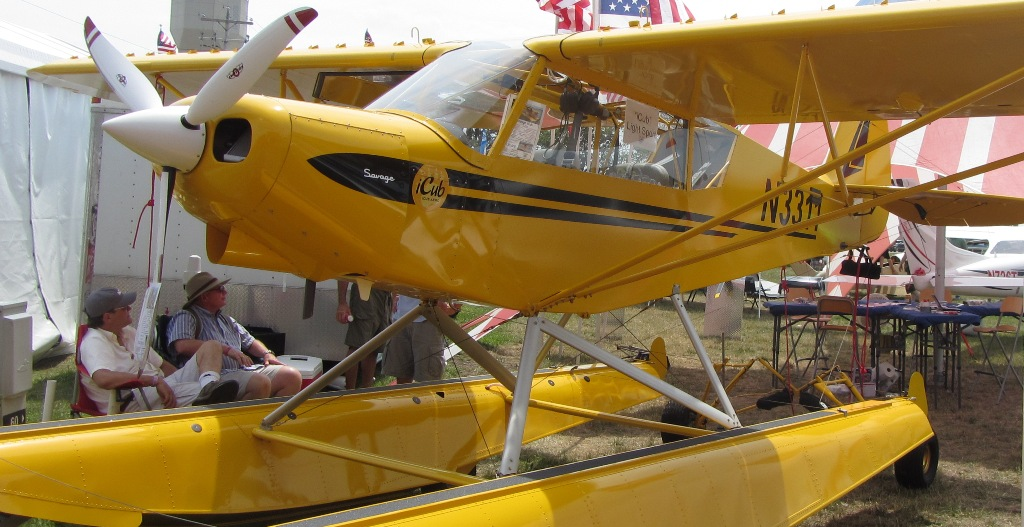
- Zlin Savage iCub on floats

General information
- Type: light sport aircraft
- National origin: Czech Republic
- Manufacturer: Zlin Aviation

The Zlin Savage is a series of light sport aircraft similar in construction to the Piper Cub manufactured by the Zlin Aircraft Company of Zlín, Czech Republic.

== Design and development ==
The Zlin Savage series are strut-braced, high-wing aircraft with conventional landing gear. The fuselage is constructed with welded steel tubing. The wings are constructed with aluminum spars and wing ribs with aircraft fabric covering. Fuel is stored in two wing root tanks. The control surfaces use aluminum skins.

The design is an accepted Federal Aviation Administration special light-sport aircraft under the marketing names of Savage, Classic, Cruiser, Cub, iCub, Cub S, Bobber, Nomad and Outback.

== Variants ==
Savage Classic
Base model for the US light-sport aircraft category. Engines are the 80 hp (60 kW) Rotax 912UL, the 100 hp (75 kW) Rotax 912ULS, 85 hp (63 kW) Jabiru 2200 or the 115 hp (86 kW) Rotax 914 turbocharged four-stroke aircraft engine.
Savage Cruiser
Modified windshield, windows, fuselage bottom.

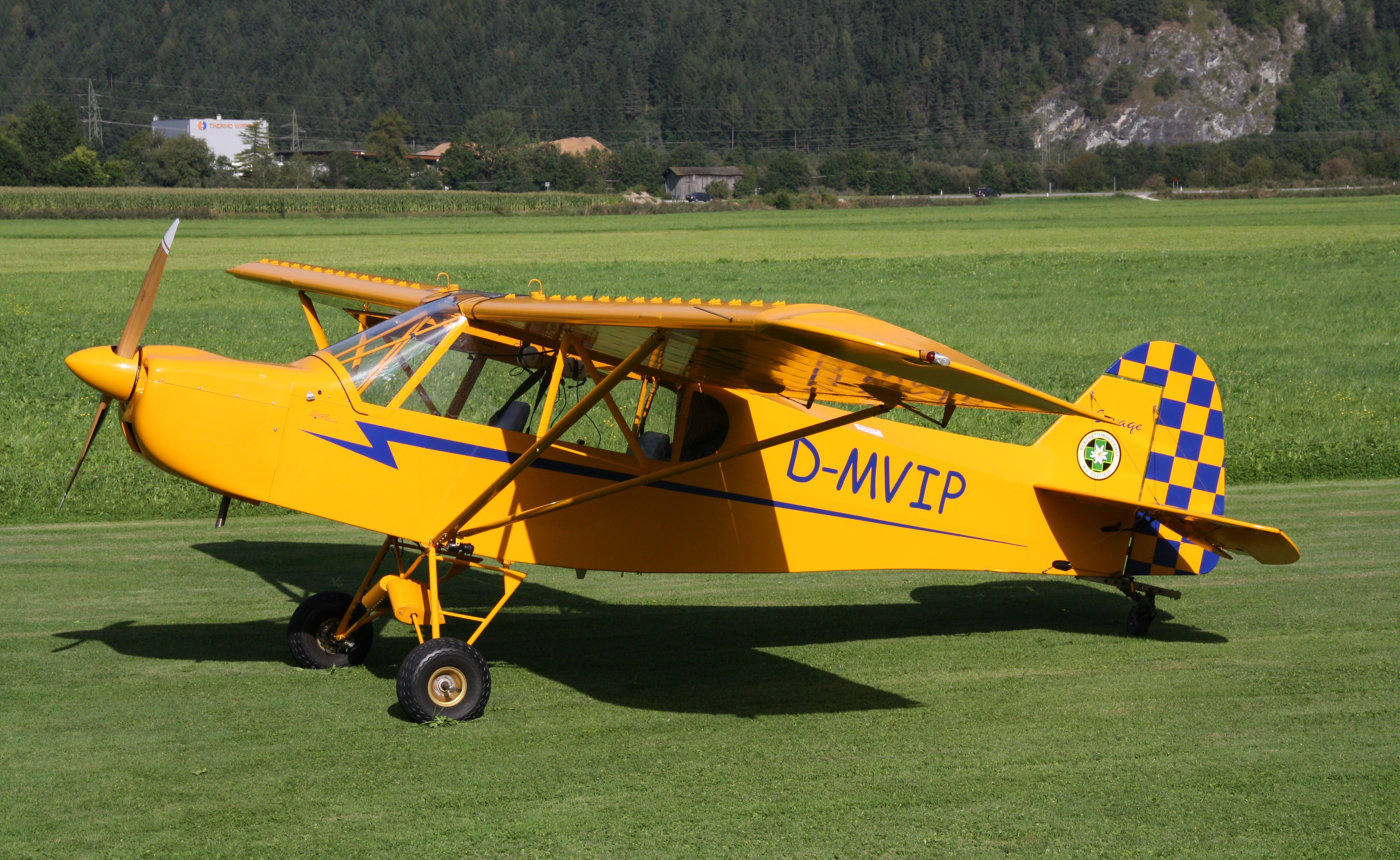
Zlin Savage Cub

Savage Cub
Zlin Savage modified with Piper Super Cub appearance and features, with optional tundra tires.

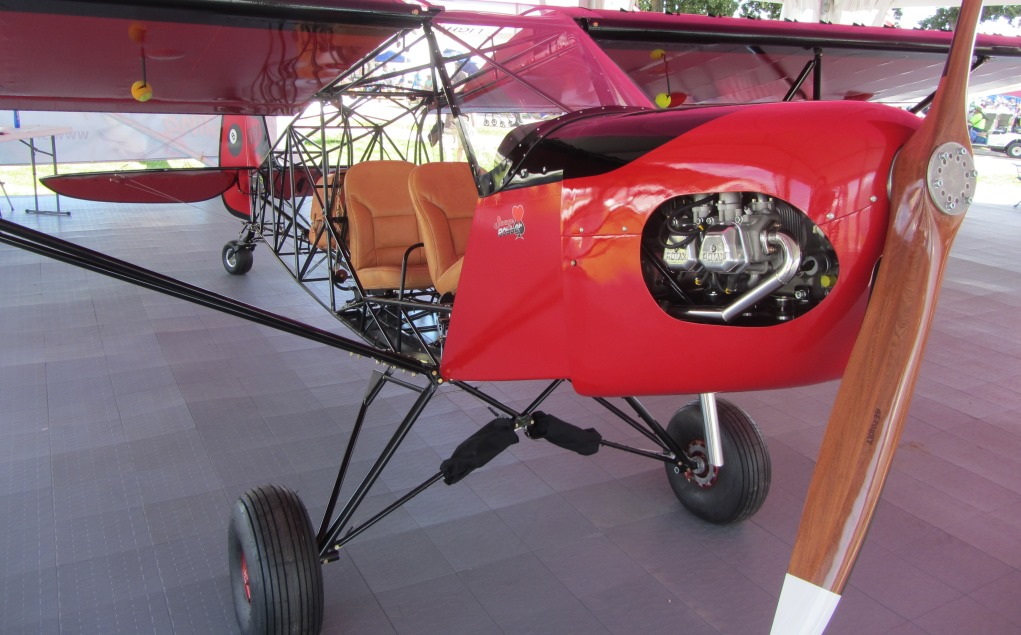
Zlin Savage Bobber

Savage Bobber
A Savage Cub with an uncovered open-frame fuselage designed to comply with the Fédération Aéronautique Internationale microlight rules including a maximum gross weight of 472.5 kg (1,042 lb). The baggage compartment is a fabric or leather bag strapped to the airframe.
Savage Cub S
Extended fuselage and larger tail surfaces. Multiple engine installations from 100 to 180 hp (75 to 134 kW). The 180 hp (134 kW) Titan Stroker IO-340 powerplant was introduced in 2013.

== Specifications (Zlin Savage) ==
Data from manufacturer

General characteristics

- Crew: 1
- Capacity: 1
- Length: 6.39 m (21 ft 0 in)
- Wingspan: 9.31 m (30 ft 7 in)
- Height: 2.03 m (6 ft 8 in)
- Wing area: 14.2 m^{2} (153 sq ft)
- Airfoil: Modified NACA 4412
- Empty weight: 288 kg (635 lb)
- Gross weight: 560 kg (1,235 lb)
- Fuel capacity: 64 litres (14 imp gal; 17 US gal)
- Powerplant: 1 × Rotax 912UL Four cylinder horizontally opposed piston, 60 kW (80 hp)

Performance

- Maximum speed: 188 km/h (117 mph, 102 kn)
- Cruise speed: 170 km/h (110 mph, 92 kn)
- Stall speed: 62 km/h (39 mph, 33 kn)
- Never exceed speed: 205 km/h (127 mph, 111 kn)
- Range: 720 km (450 mi, 390 nmi)
- Service ceiling: 4,400 m (14,400 ft)
- Rate of climb: 4.8 m/s (940 ft/min)
