= List of aircraft (T) =

This is a list of aircraft in alphabetical order beginning with 'T'.
