= Dabrowski D.1 Cykacz =

D.1 Cykacz
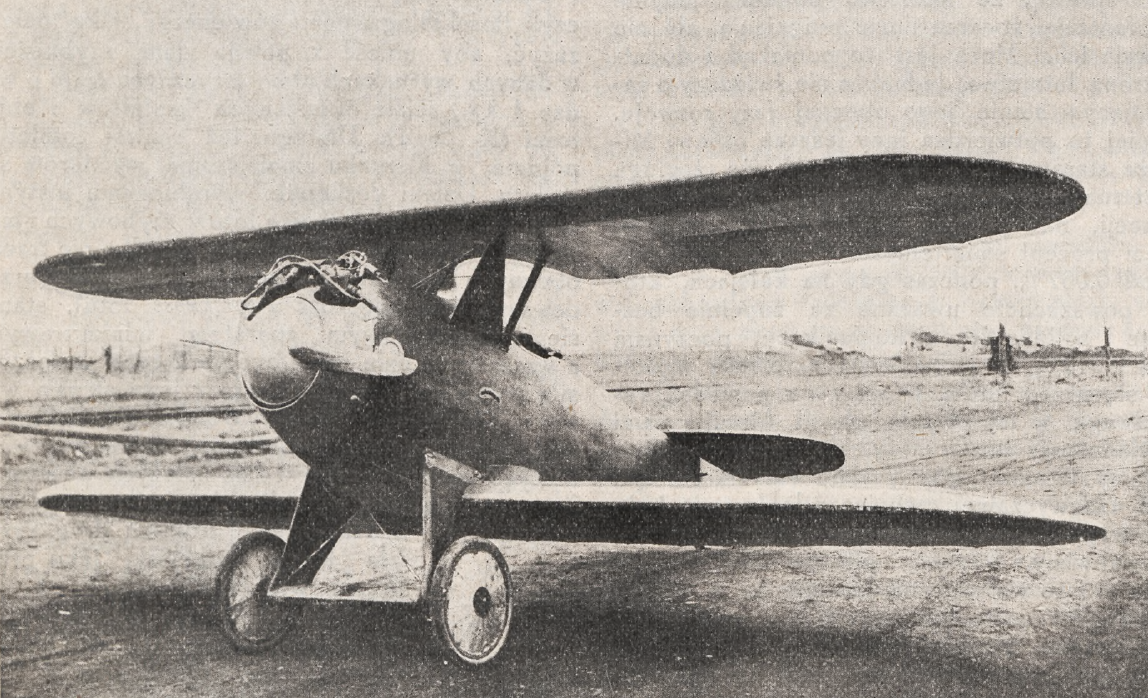

General information
- Type: Single seat sport aircraft
- National origin: Poland
- Designer: Jerzy Dąbrowski
- Number built: 1

History
- First flight: 26 February 1923

The Dąbrowski D.1 Cykacz (Ticktock) was an unusual, small, low-powered, single-seat biplane, intended to provide wider access to flying. Though it was exceptionally aerodynamically clean, it was under-powered and had limited range. Only one was built.

== Design and development ==
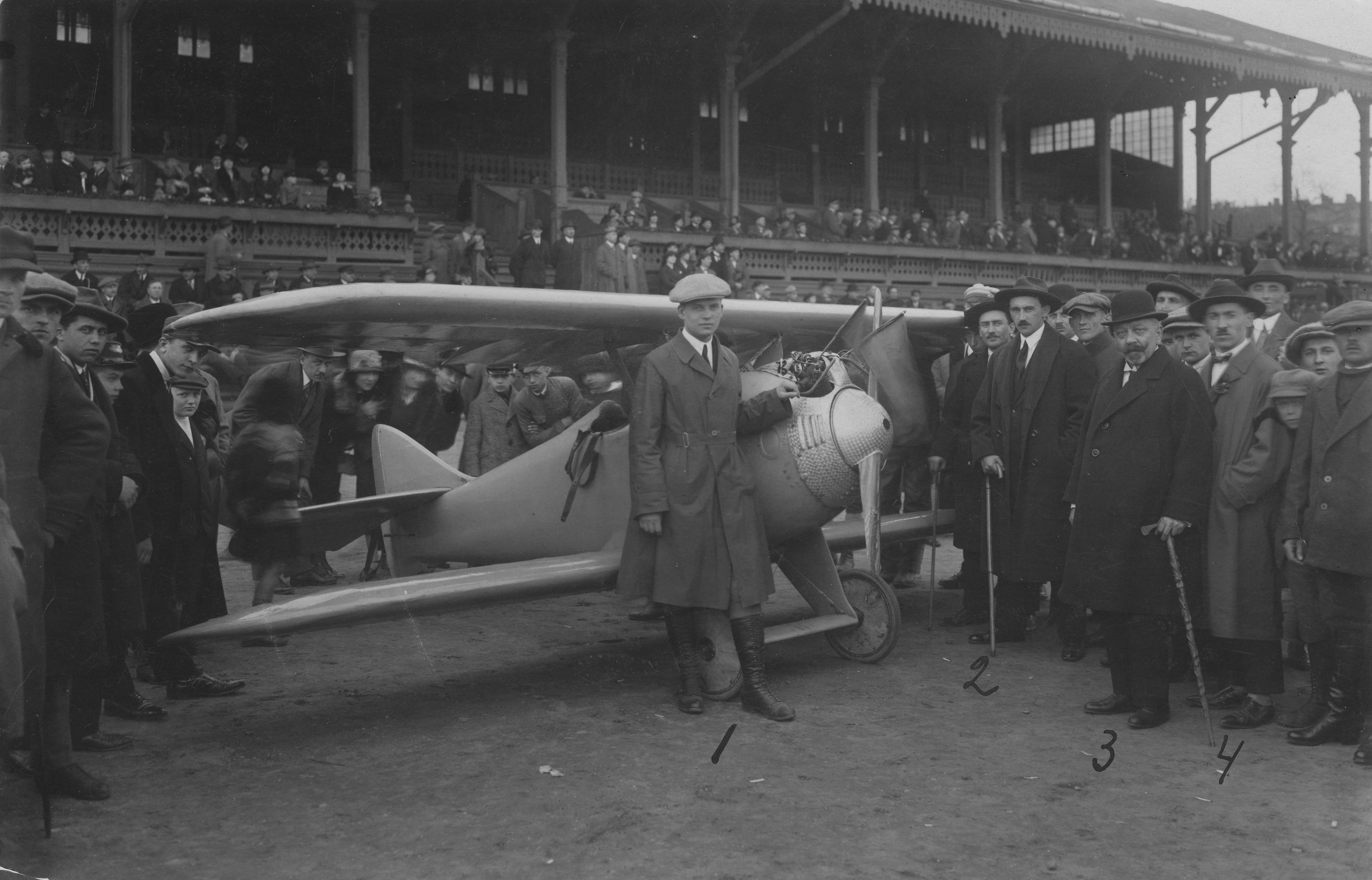
Constructor at the D.1 Cykacz aircraft

Jerzy Dąbrowski's first aircraft design, produced early in 1924 while he was a student at the Warsaw Technical University, was an unusually clean biplane with an entirely wooden structure. Its one-piece wings were built around two spars and had plywood covered leading edges, with fabric covering elsewhere. The leading edges were straight and unswept out to semi-elliptical tips and the inboard part of the wings had parallel chord inboard but tapered outboard. These outboard regions carried tapered ailerons, though only on the upper wing; ailerons apart, the upper and lower wings were identical. The great majority of biplanes have had upper and lower wings braced together with interplane struts but the Cykacz had none; instead, the fairly thick section wings were cantilevers. The upper wing was supported high over the fuselage on a pair of outward-leaning N-struts with the forward V faired in and the centre of the lower wing was attached to the bottom of the fuselage. There was significant stagger.

The Cykacz was powered by a 12 kW (16 hp) Blackburne Tomtit, an air-cooled V-twin engine. The whole fuselage was a smooth, oval section semi-monocoque structure with wooden frames and ply skin and the engine was in its forward part, though with its cylinders exposed for cooling. The small diameter propeller, designed by Dabrovsky, had a dished spinner that blended into the fuselage's lines. The biplane's single, open cockpit was under the upper trailing edge where there was a cut-out to increase the pilot's field of view.

The Cykacz had a conventional empennage with a fin that was integral with the fuselage and ply covered. Its tailplane was, like the wings, in a single piece with a ply-covered leading edge and fabric elsewhere. It was mounted on the top of the fuselage and, together with its separated elevators, was roughly elliptical in plan. Its rudder, which was rounded, low but broad, extended down to the keel. These control surfaces were wooden with fabric covering.

Its undercarriage was fixed and conventional, with a track of 1.03 m (40.6 in). A single axle was held on two V-struts from the lower fuselage, with rubber chord shock absorbers. The V-struts had ply fairings and the axle was enclosed within a small lift-giving aerofoil.

When first tested, the Cykacz was reluctant to take off, partly because the Tomtit engine was unreliable and had to be kept below the high output shaft speeds for which the propeller was designed. Babinski took it on its first flight on 26 February 1925. Once off the ground it proved responsive and easy to fly and to land, which it did at low speeds and in short distances. A series of short flights led to some empennage modifications and the fitting of a better-matched propeller enabled the Cykacz to log a total of about forty rather short flights. Its engine remained unreliable and the biplane was both underpowered in flight and of short range. It appeared in an exhibition at the Warsaw Technical University in August 1925 but by 1926 Dąbrowski had abandoned it and was working on a new design.

== Specifications ==
Data from Cynk (1971) p.115 except where noted.

General characteristics

- Crew: One
- Length: 3.7 m (12 ft 2 in)
- Wingspan: 5 m (16 ft 5 in)
- Height: 1.65 m (5 ft 5 in)
- Wing area: 8.2 m^{2} (88 sq ft)
- Airfoil: Dewoitine
- Empty weight: 125 kg (276 lb)
- Gross weight: 227 kg (500 lb)
- Fuel capacity: 11 L (2.4 imp gal; 2.9 US gal)
- Powerplant: 1 × Blackburne Tomtit air-cooled V-twin, 12 kW (16 hp) at 2,400 rpm and 18 kW (24 hp) at 3,600 rpm.
- Propellers: 2-bladed designed by Jerzy Dabrowski, 1.35 m (4 ft 5 in) diameter wooden

Performance

- Maximum speed: 100 km/h (62 mph, 54 kn) approximately
- Stall speed: 50 km/h (31 mph, 27 kn)
- Landing speed: about 40 mph (64 km/h)
- Landing distance: 10–15 m (33–49 ft)
