= Zeppelin-Lindau Gs.I =

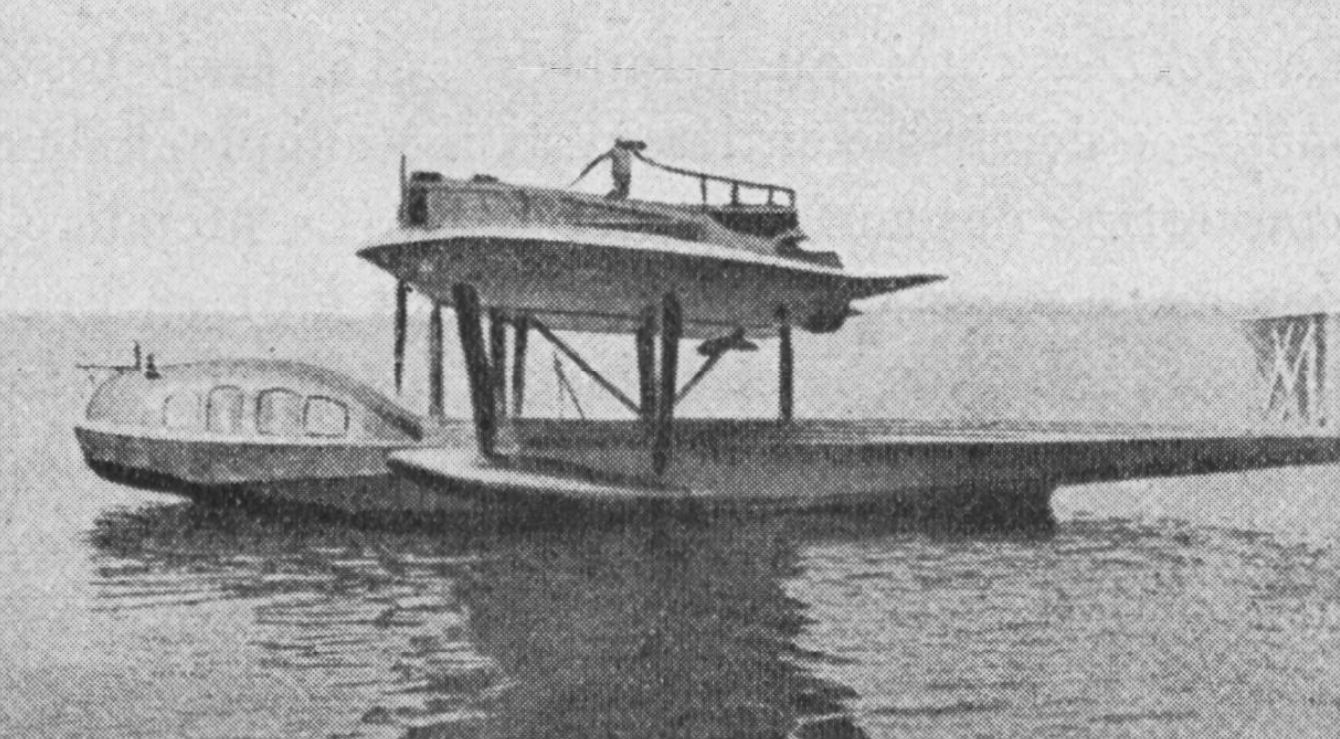

General information
- Type: six seat passenger flying boat
- National origin: Germany
- Manufacturer: Zeppelin-werk Lindau GmbH
- Designer: Claude Dornier
- Number built: 1

History
- First flight: 31 July 1919

The Zeppelin-Lindau Gs.I, often known post-WWI as the Dornier Gs.I after its designer Claude Dornier, was a civil flying boat developed immediate post-war from a military prototype. Its passenger cabin seated six. Only one was completed, and that was eventually scuttled to keep it out of Allied hands. Another of the military prototypes was intended to have a bigger, nine seat cabin and other refinements but the Gs.II was incomplete when discovered by Allied inspectors.

== Design and development ==
The Gs.I was originally designed as a reconnaissance flying boat for the German Navy. Construction began in August 1918 but it was unfinished by the time of the November Armistice, after which militarary aircraft building was forbidden. Zeppelin-Lindau responded by completing one of the three examples ordered into a small airliner.

Like the earlier Zeppelin-Lindau Rs.II and its successors, the all-metal Gs.I was a high wing, strut-braced monoplane but its engines were on top of the wing rather than between it and the hull. The wing had twin, triangular section spars, aluminium ribs and was fabric-covered. It was rectangular in plan apart from slightly blunted tips, with a low aspect ratio of 5.6. On each side a parallel pair of steel tube struts braced the outer wings to the sponsons, which provided stability on water. The centre-section struttage was complicated by the need to support and absorb the engine weight and thrust.

The Gs.I was powered by a pair of water-cooled, six cylinder inline, 260 hp (190 kW) Maybach Mb IVa engines in push-pull configuration within a single cowling on top of the wing. The forward engine had a frontal radiator but the rear one had a smaller radiator above the cowling and its upper parts exposed for cooling. Their tanks held 900 L (200 imp gal; 240 US gal) of fuel.

The flying boat's duralumin hull was wide and its shallow planing bottom had its main step under mid-wing, narrowing aft to a secondary step. The original military design accommodated three, a nose gunner, the pilot in a cockpit ahead of the wing and a dorsal gunner between wing and tail. Instead, the airliner had a small, enclosed, rounded passenger cabin built upon the deck ahead of the wing. The pilot sat in an open cockpit above the front of the cabin, which held six (or eight) passengers and had four generous windows on each side. The position of the flight engineer is uncertain: L'Aérophile describes a post under the wing whilst images show a position behind the pilot as well as an unenclosed dorsal post. The Gs.I had a twin finned, strutted biplane tail. The lower, rectangular plan tailplane was mounted on top of the fuselage with rectangular fins at its tips supporting a wider span upper tailplane with slightly angled tips. The elevators were also rectangular but the rudders were cut away at the top for elevator movement.

== Operational history ==
The Gs.I made its first flight on 21 July 1919. After a period of flight-testing it was trialed by the Swiss airliner ad Astra, a forerunner of Swissair. After a series of flights it was returned to Lindau on 10 December 1919. It then gave a demonstration flight on 3 March 1920 in the Netherlands, where KLM had shown an interest. On their way to another demonstration, this time in Stockholm, the crew learned that the aircraft was to be searched by the commission who supervised German aircraft construction at the time. Rather than risking the Gs.I's confiscation and the revelation of its advanced construction features they diverted to Kiel and, on 25 April 1920, scuttled it in the Baltic.

== Zeppelin-Lindau Gs.II ==
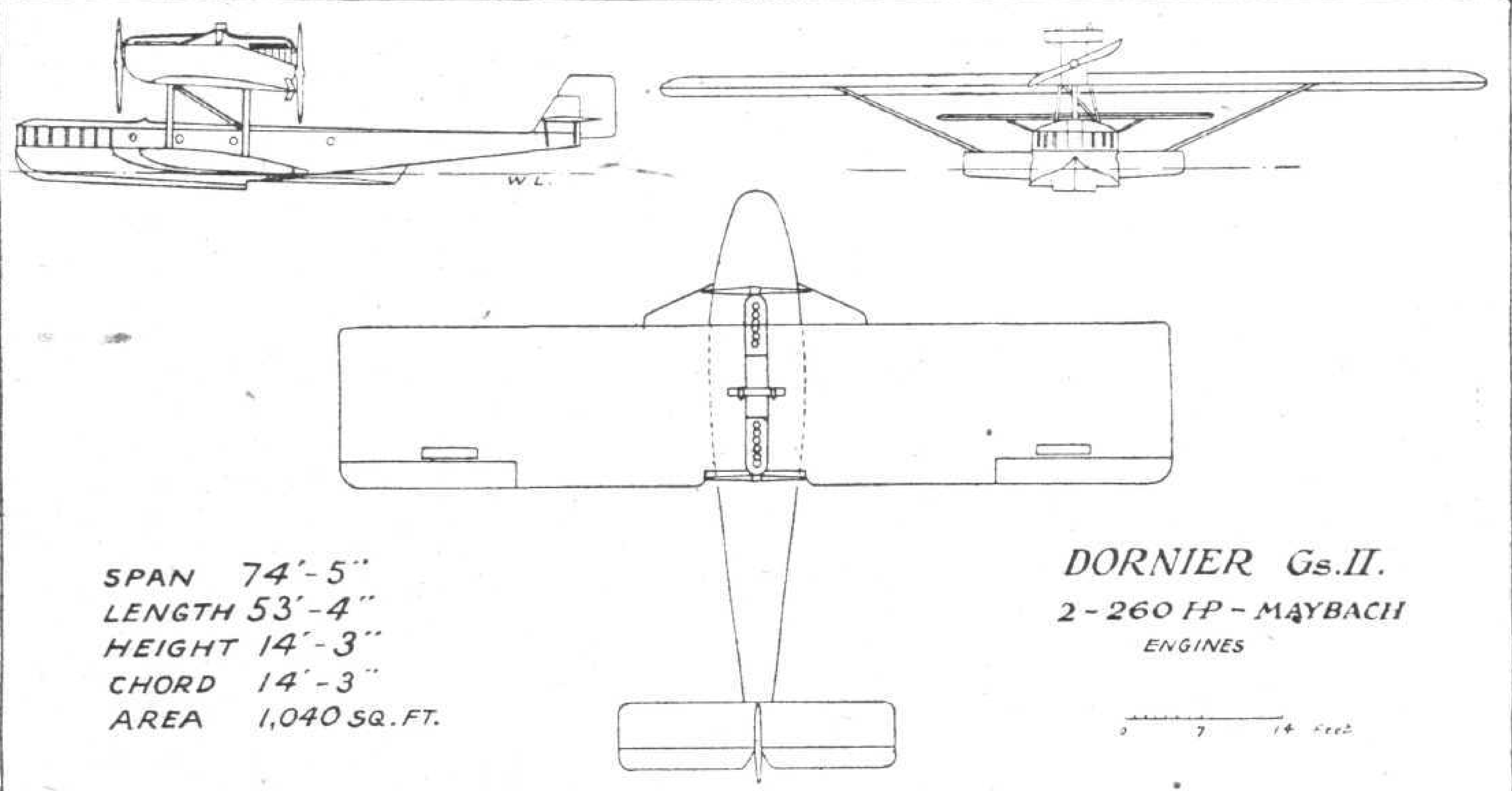

The Gs.II was a planned larger and more refined version of the Gs.I, using the two remaining military Gs.I airframes. The layout and engines remained the same but wing area was increased by 22% by a 7% increase in span and 6% decrease in aspect ratio. The new wing was metal-skinned, with readily removed panels for internal inspection, though fabric-covering was an option, yielding an extra 200 kg (440 lb) of payload.

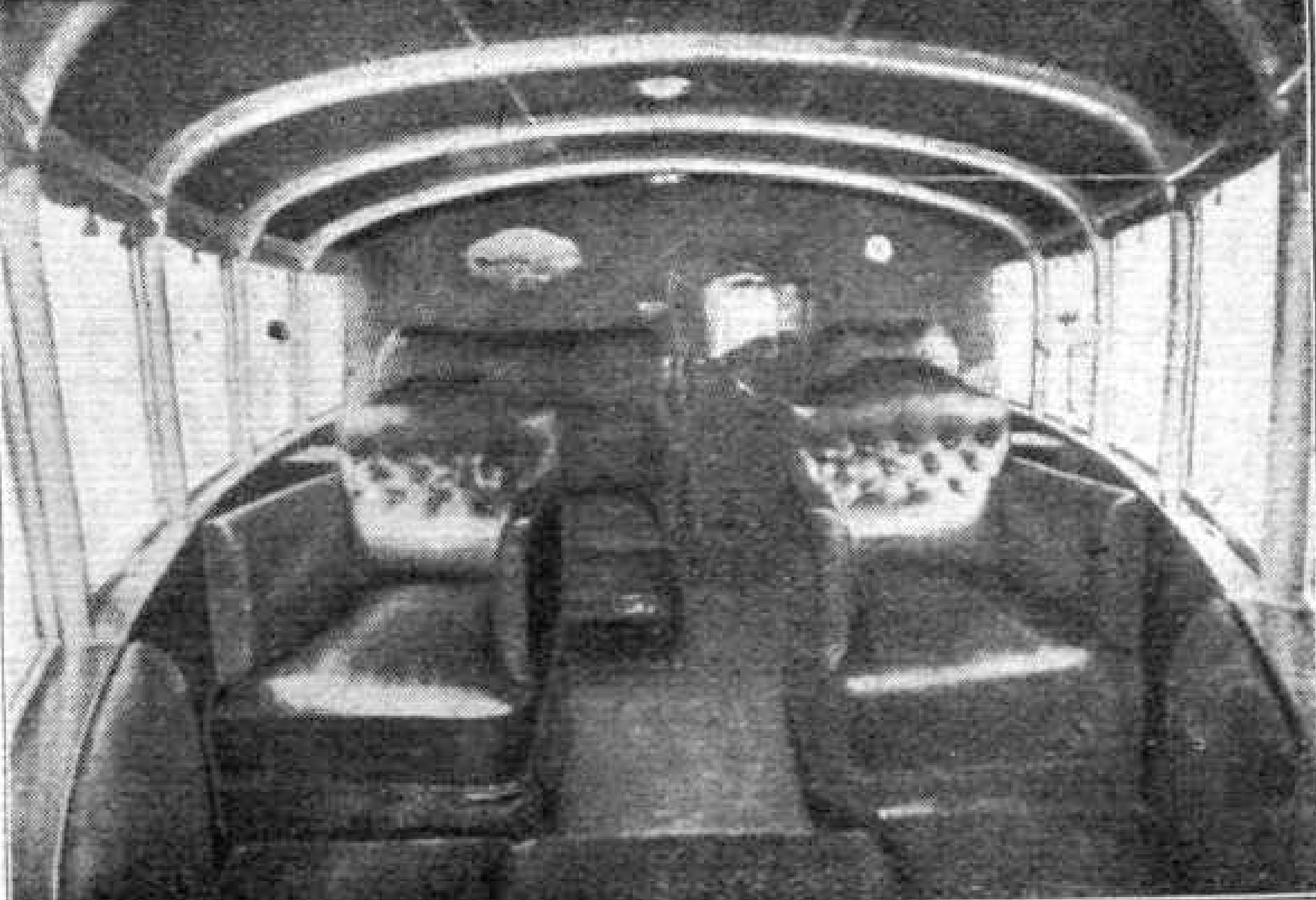
Dornier Gs.II cabin

The other major changes were to the passenger and crew accommodation and to the tail. The bulbous cabin of the Gs.I was removed and a new, longer cabin built under the original deckline, stretching back to the plane of the forward propeller. It could hold eight, or nine "at a pinch". To the rear of the cabin there was a luggage hold and, behind that, the fuel tanks. The pilot and mechanic also sat to the rear of the cabin, raised to deck level and behind the propeller, in an open, side-by-side seat cockpit.

The Gs.I's biplane, twin-finned tail was replaced by a more conventional, cruciform unit with angular surfaces. A small fin with a cropped triangular profile carried a balanced rudder and also mounted a rectangular plan tailplane, double strut-mounted just above the fuselage. This carried rectangular, narrow chord elevators.

The partial construction of at least one Gs.II is known from photographs to have started and its new forward fuselage mostly built but it was probably destroyed by the Allies in 1919 before completion.

== Operators ==
- ad Astra (Gs.I)

== Specifications (Gs.I) ==
Data from L'Aérophile, August 1921 except where noted

General characteristics

- Crew: two
- Capacity: six passengers
- Length: 16.60 m (54 ft 6 in)
- Wingspan: 21.00 m (68 ft 11 in)
- Height: 4.30 m (14 ft 1 in)
- Wing area: 79.0 m^{2} (850 sq ft)
- Empty weight: 3,000 kg (6,614 lb)
- Gross weight: 4,300 kg (9,480 lb)
- Fuel capacity: 900 L (200 imp gal; 240 US gal)
- Powerplant: 2 × Maybach Mb IVa water-cooled, six cylinder inline, 190 kW (260 hp) each
- Propellers: 2-bladed, 3 m (9 ft 10 in) diameter

Performance

- Maximum speed: 180 km/h (110 mph, 97 kn)
- Cruise speed: 140 km/h (87 mph, 76 kn)
- Range: 600 km (370 mi, 320 nmi)
- Service ceiling: 4,500 m (14,800 ft)
- Fuel consumption: 1.75 kg/km (6.2 lb/mi)

== Bibliography ==
- Gray, Peter & Thetford, Owen (1987) [1970]. German Aircraft of the First World War (2nd ed.). London: Putnam. ISBN 0-85177-809-7.
- Schmeelke, Michael (2020). Zeppelin-Lindau Aircraft of WWI: Claude Dornier's Metal Airplanes 1914–1919. Great War Aviation Centennial Series. Vol. 42. n.p.: Aeronaut Books. ISBN 978-1-935881-83-4.
