= Zalewski W.Z.XI Kogutek =

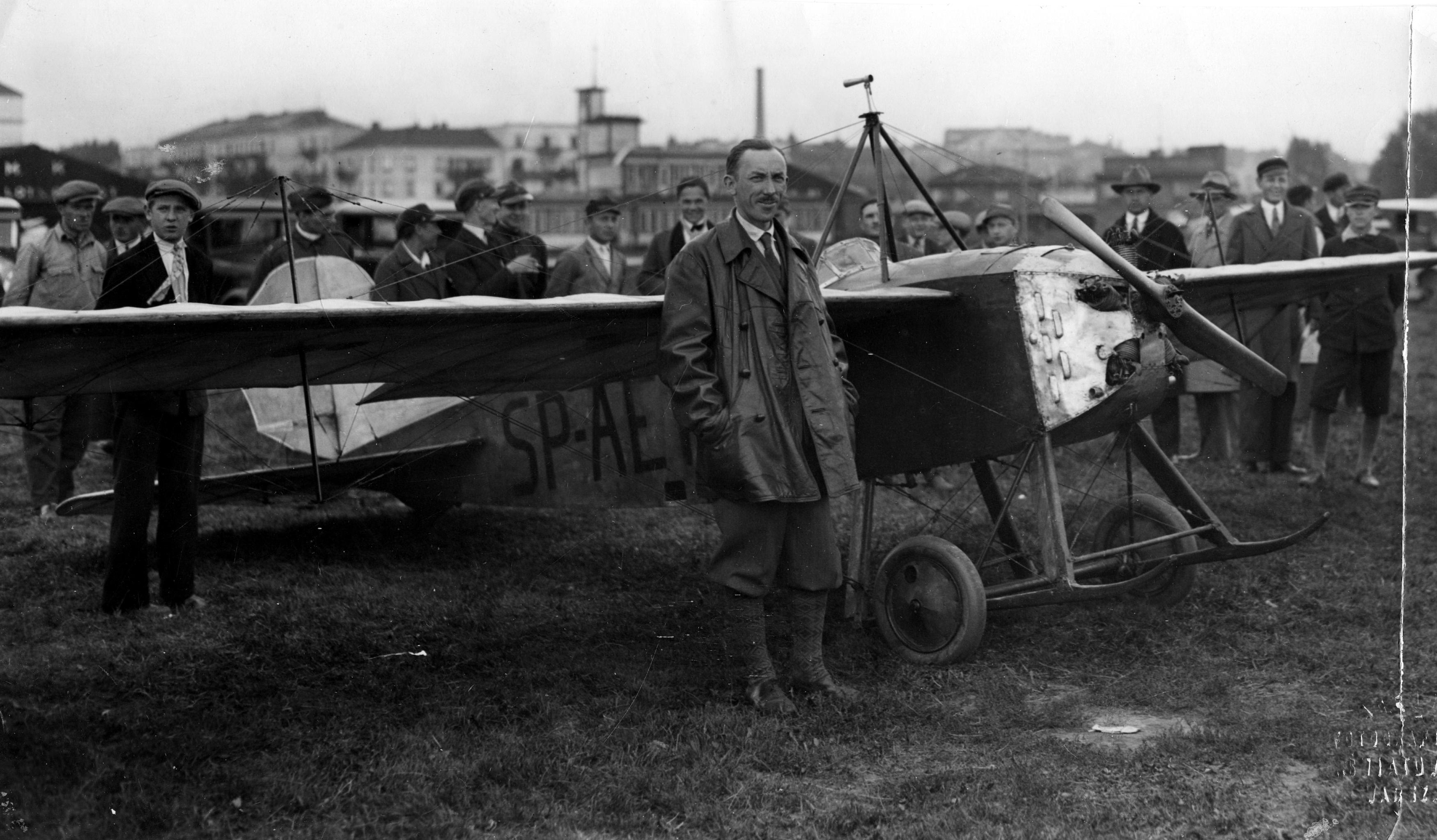
- The W.Z.XI with its designer leaning on the wing

General information
- Type: Single-seat sports
- National origin: Poland
- Designer: Władyslaw Zalewski

History
- First flight: 9 October 1927

The Zalewski W.Z.XI Kogutek I (Cockerel I) was a basic, single seat sport aircraft designed and built in Poland in the 1920s. Its engine was also designed and built by Zalewski, making it the first all-Polish aircraft to fly.

== Design and development ==
After a series of numbered but unbuilt designs, Władyslaw Zalewski spent his spare time evolving the simplest and cheapest single seat aircraft on which to learn to fly. He concentrated on lightness and good handling rather than performance and, since he had no external funding, reused material from his first but uncompleted pre-war W.Z.I biplane. The W.Z.XI was the result. Part-time construction began slowly in 1926 in his workshop at Milanówek, though in the following spring Zalewski made a determined attempt to have it ready for the First National Lightplane Contest, scheduled for that autumn. Despite his efforts the first flight, piloted by Zbigniew Babinski, took it to nearby Warsaw only on the final day of the Contest.

The shoulder wings of the Kogutek were rectangular in plan, each built around two spars and fabric covered. They were mounted on the upper fuselage longerons with some dihedral. The W.Z.I legacy gave the wings a thin section, so they were wire braced, the upper wires attached above the fuselage to a pyramid of four struts placed between the engine and cockpit. The lower wires were fixed to the lower fuselage longerons. Both sets reached the outer parts of the wings via kingposts attached to the forward spars which projected both above and below, an anachronistic feature by the later 1920s. Its ailerons occupied most of the trailing edges and increased in chord outwards.

The fuselage of the W.X.XI had a rectangular section structure defined by four longerons and was plywood-covered. .The ply upper fuselage decking was rounded, interrupted by an open cockpit at mid-chord. Its engine was a Zalewski WZ.18 13 kW (18 hp), five cylinder radial engine designed and built in 1923, housed in a blunt, metal cowling with its cylinders partly exposed for cooling. A hinged mounting allowed easy access for servicing. Fuel and oil tanks were behind the engine

The empennage of the W.Z.XI was conventional though large, with wooden structures and fabric covering. The horizontal tail was mounted at mid-fuselage and had an unusual plan which led to the "Cockerel" name: the wire-braced tailplane's leading edges tapered strongly from the root with concave curvature out to forward projecting spurs. It carried a single, semi-elliptical elevator. Its fin had a similar profile to the tailplane and mounted an unbalanced, semi-circular rudder working above the elevator.

The W.Z.XI's conventional, fixed landing gear also followed earlier practice. The wheels, with rubber cord shock absorbers, were on a single axle attached to two skids mounted on the lower fuselage sides with a pair of cross-bracing struts between them.

== Operational history ==
After its appearance at the Contest, Babinski flew the W.Z.XI around the country to increase awareness of aviation. It took part in the Second National Lightplane Contest in 1928 but engine problems restricted it to ninth place, though it did win a Ministry of Transport prize for the shortest landing distance (70 m (230 ft)). In 1930 it appeared in its last National Lightplane Contest, the third, but was forced to retire. It remained active until February 1934 when SP-AEF was deleted from the Polish civil register. It was replaced by the more advanced Zalewski W.Z.XII Kogutek II.

== Specifications ==
Data from Cynk, 1971

General characteristics

- Crew: One
- Length: 5 m (16 ft 5 in)
- Wingspan: 7.86 m (25 ft 9 in)
- Height: 1.8 m (5 ft 11 in)
- Wing area: 10 m^{2} (110 sq ft)
- Airfoil: St Cyr 2A
- Empty weight: 115 kg (254 lb)
- Gross weight: 205 kg (452 lb) normal loaded
- Powerplant: 1 × Zalewski W.Z.18 five cylinder radial, 13 kW (18 hp) at 2,400 rpm
- Propellers: 2-bladed Zalewski

Performance

- Maximum speed: 90 km/h (56 mph, 49 kn)
- Cruise speed: 80 km/h (50 mph, 43 kn)
- Stall speed: 56 km/h (35 mph, 30 kn) minimum
- Endurance: 2.5 hr
- Landing distance: 70 m (230 ft)
