= Zeppelin C.I =

German two-seat, single-engine reconnaissance biplane

Zeppelin C.I & C.II
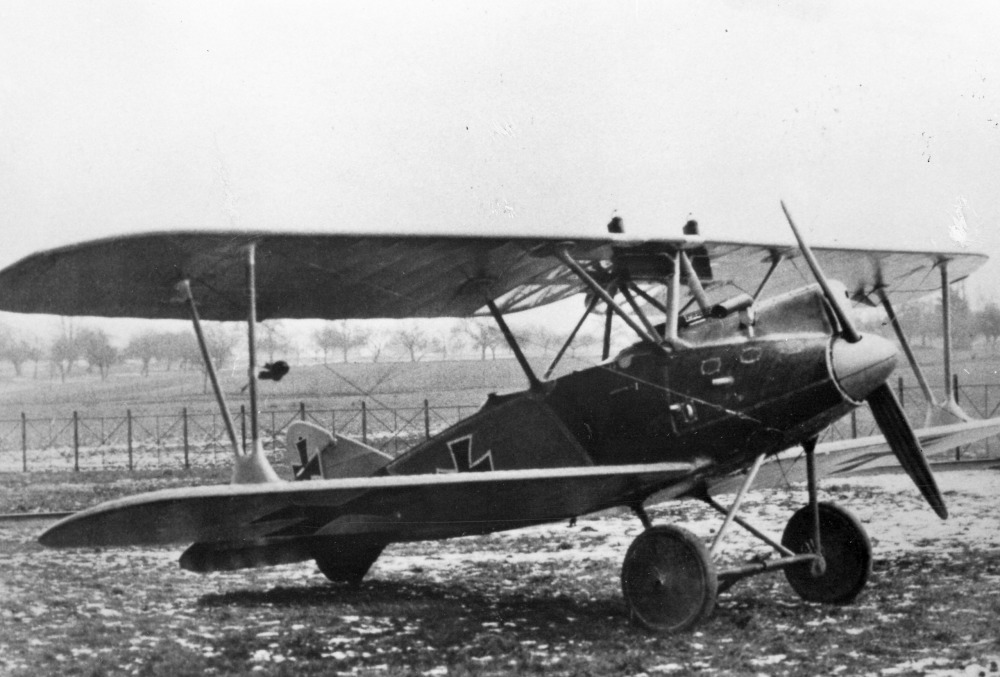

General information
- Type: Experimental
- Manufacturer: Zeppelin
- Designer: Paul Jaray
- Number built: 2 C.II and 20 C.II

History
- First flight: Autumn 1917

The Zeppelin C.I (sometimes Zeppelin (Jaray) C.I, Zeppelin-Friedrichshafen C.I, or Zeppelin LZ C.I) was a German single-engine two-seat biplane, designed by Paul Jaray and built by Zeppelin in World War I. Friedrichshafen referred to the location of the Zeppelin factory where development occurred, and was not connected with the aircraft manufacturer of that name.

== Development ==
The structure of the C.I was wood with a fabric covering, while the C.II had a metal structure, and dispensed with the horn balance on the rudder.

== Specifications ==
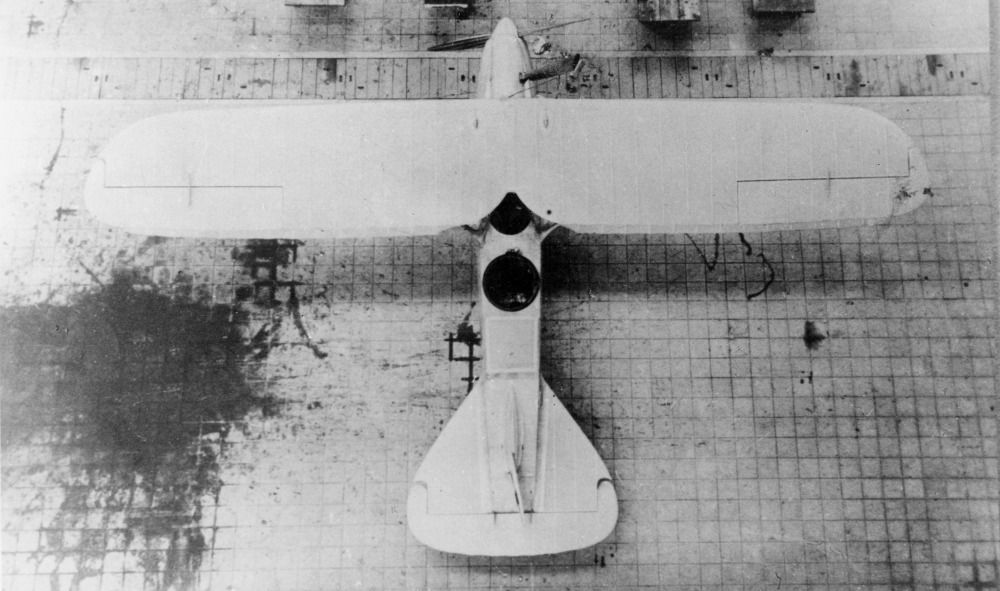
top view of Zeppelin (Jaray) C.I

Data from

General characteristics

- Crew: Two
- Length: 7.925 m (26 ft 0 in)
- Wingspan: 12 m (39 ft 4 in)
- Height: 3.585 m (11 ft 9 in)
- Empty weight: 987.5 kg (2,177 lb)
- Gross weight: 1,455 kg (3,208 lb)
- Powerplant: 1 × Maybach Mb.IV 6-cylinder in-line water-cooled piston engine, 180 kW (240 hp)
- Propellers: 2-bladed fixed-pitch wooden propeller

Performance

- Maximum speed: 200 km/h (120 mph, 110 kn)
- Time to altitude: 33 minutes to 5,000 m (16,000 ft)
