= Zenith Albatross Z-12 =

1928 passenger airliner model

Albatross
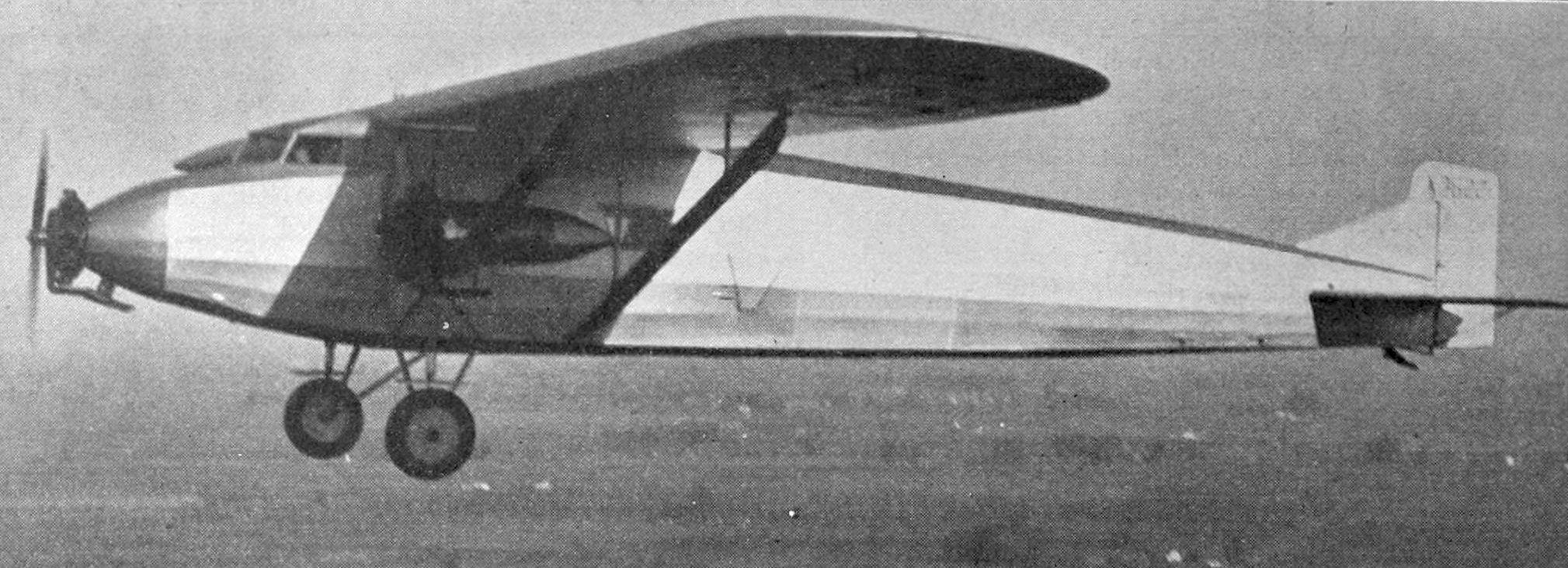
- The Albatross in April 1928 with Siemens-Halske engines

General information
- Type: 11 passenger airliner
- National origin: U.S.
- Manufacturer: Zenith Aircraft Company
- Designer: Albin K. Peterson and Charles P. Rocheville
- Number built: 1

History
- First flight: 9 January 1928

The Zenith Albatross Z-12 was a large, three-engined airliner built in the United States in 1928. It could carry up to 11 passengers. Only one was completed.

== Design and development ==
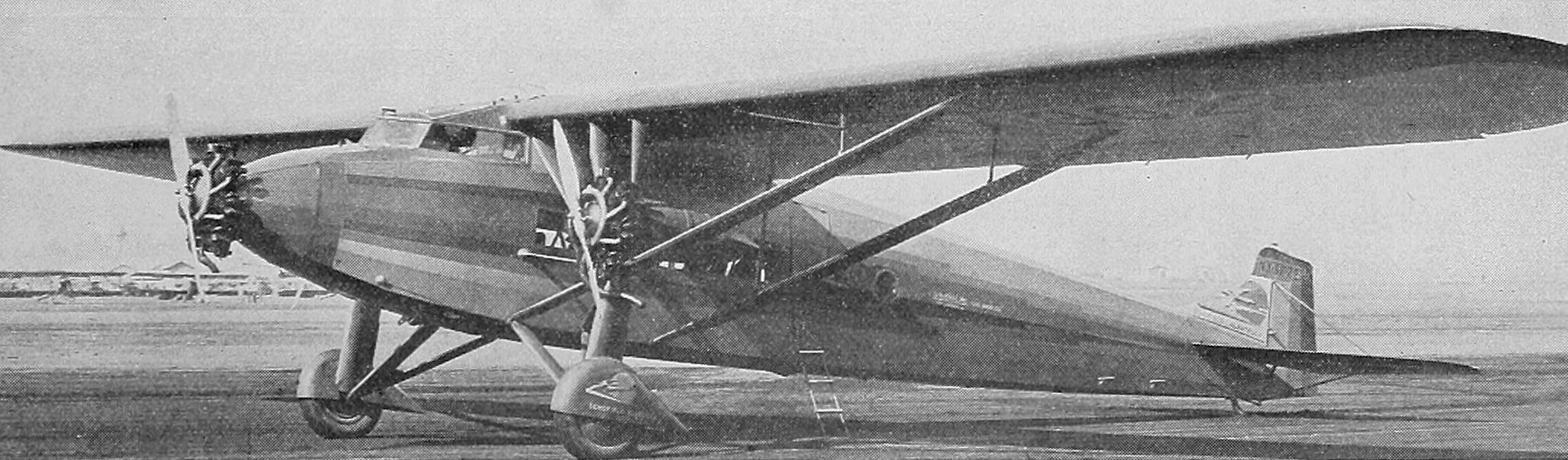
The Albatross in 1930 with Axelson engines

The Zenith Albatross Z-12 was designed and built by the Zenith Aircraft Company of Santa Ana, California and first flew there in January 1930. By October 1929 Schofield Inc had bought the rights to build it at their Los Angeles factory and by January 1930 the prototype had been re-engined there.

When the Albatross first flew in January 1928 it was described as the largest aircraft built on the West Coast. It was a three-engined, high wing monoplane with a span of 90 ft (27 m) and a large passenger cabin, designed for long haul routes including those from coast to coast. Its two spar wings was rectangular in plan out to rounded tips and braced on each side by a parallel pair of streamlined struts from the lower fuselage longerons to the spars.

The Albatross was initially powered by three 125 hp (93 kW) Siemens-Halske Sh 14 engines but in 1930 Schofield replaced them with 115 hp (86 kW) Axelson A-7Rs. Both were 7 cylinder radial engines and were similarly mounted. The outer pair were attached to the forward wing strut, with triplets of upward struts to the forward spar and horizontal struts to the fuselage, and the central engine was mounted on the slender nose of the forward fuselage.

Behind the central engine the fuselage expanded rapidly to the pilots' enclosed cabin, ahead of the wing leading edge, which seated the two pilots. In the original Zenith cabin there was also a bunk to allow one of the pilots to sleep on a long flight, but the Schofield layout seated a navigator instead. Immediately behind and below the crew a windowed cabin had individual seats for 9 passengers and a two or three-seater couch. Passengers entered their cabin via a left side door at the rear. There was a toilet behind the cabin together with a baggage compartment, though there was another baggage hold below the pilots' cabin.

The tail was conventional, with tailplane and elevators set at mid-fuselage. The fin was triangular and carried a near rectangular, balanced rudder.

The Albatross had fixed, split axle, tailwheel landing gear. The main wheels were on V-struts from the lower fuselage longerons, with vertical shock-absorbing landing legs joining the forward wing struts at the engine mountings. At some date between March 1928 and February 1930 the struts and legs were enclosed in aircraft fairings and the wheels semi-enclosed.

== Operational history ==
After its first flight in January 1928, preparations began for an attempt on the world endurance record. In March it had flown carrying 1,300 US gal (1,100 imp gal; 4,900 L) of fuel at a loaded weight of 13,000 lb (5,900 kg). With that quantity of fuel the calculated range was 6,700 mi (10,800 km; 5,800 nmi). At a cruising speed of 95 mph (153 km/h; 83 kn) the flight would have lasted just over 70 hrs but no reports of a record attempt are known.

Also unknown is the date of the first flight with Axelson engines but by January 1930 it was reported as flying satisfactorily with them. Though Schofield had originally intended to put the Albatross into production there is no evidence of further examples.

The demise of the Zenith Albatross Z-12 was much the same as the Fokker F-32 which adorned Bob's Airmail Service Station on Wilshire Boulevard. The Zenith Z-12 ended up adorning a Texaco station at the intersection of Ventura Blvd., Ventura Place, and Laural Canyon Blvd. ln Studio City opposite Republic Studios.

== Specifications (Axelson engines) ==
Data from Aero Digest (February 1930)

General characteristics

- Crew: Three: pilot, co-pilot and navigator
- Capacity: 11-12 passengers
- Length: 56 ft (17 m)
- Wingspan: 90 ft (27 m)
- Height: 14 ft (4.3 m)
- Wing area: 1,032 sq ft (95.9 m^{2})
- Fuel capacity: 415 US gal (346 imp gal; 1,570 L)
- Powerplant: 3 × Axelson A7-R 7 cylinder radial, 115 hp (86 kW) each

Performance

- Maximum speed: 125 mph (201 km/h, 109 kn)
- Cruise speed: 105 mph (169 km/h, 91 kn)
- Landing speed: 25 mph (40 km/h; 22 kn)
- Range: 1,200 mi (1,900 km, 1,000 nmi)
- Rate of climb: 500 ft/min (2.5 m/s) fully loaded
