= Zeppelin-Lindau CS.I =

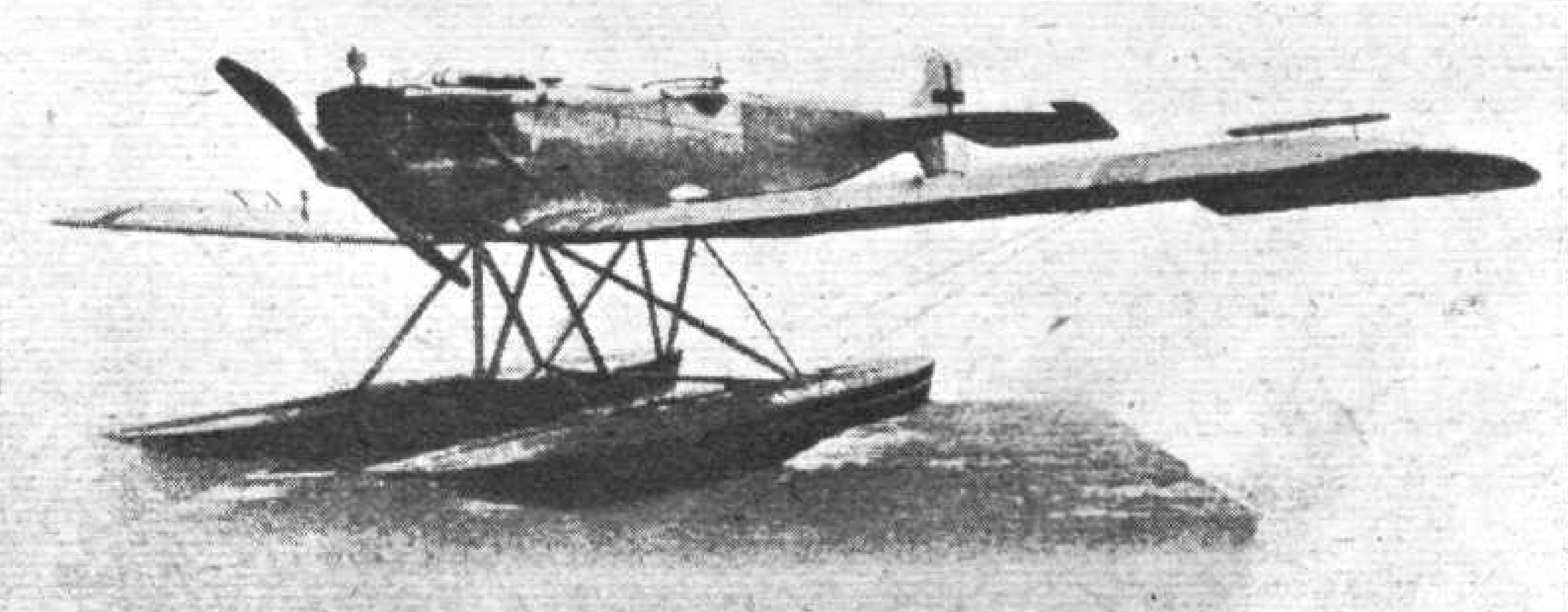
- The

General information
- Type: Reconnaissance
- Manufacturer: Zeppelin-Lindau
- Designer: Claude Dornier
- Primary user: Kaiserliche Marine
- Number built: 2

History
- First flight: 18 May 1918

The Zeppelin-Lindau CS.I was a German single-engined reconnaissance seaplane with a low-wing monoplane layout.

== Development ==
In 1918, Claude Dornier, working at the time at the Zeppelin factory in Lindau, proposed a reconnaissance seaplane to replace the Hansa-Brandenburg W.29. During flight tests, it became clear that the power of the power plant was insufficient and the engine was replaced by an 195 hp (145 kW) Benz Bz.IIIbo water-cooled V-8 engine. Nonetheless, test flights were discontinued following the World War I armistice.

== Design ==
The CS.I was a twin float all-metal seaplane with a monocoque fuselage, initially powered by a 170 hp (130 kW) Mercedes D.IIIa six-cylinder in-line water-cooled engine. Armament consisted of a fixed forward-firing, synchronised 7.92 mm (0.312 in) LMG 08/15 Spandau machine gun and a flexibly mounted 7.92 mm (0.312 in) Parabellum MG 14 machine-gun in the rear cockpit.

== Specifications ==
Data from

General characteristics

- Crew: 2
- Wingspan: 13.18 m (43 ft 3 in)
- Wing area: 29.8 m^{2} (321 sq ft)
- Empty weight: 960 kg (2,116 lb)
- Gross weight: 1,479 kg (3,261 lb)
- Powerplant: 1 × Benz Bz.IIIbo V-8 water-cooled piston engine, 145 kW (195 hp)
- Propellers: 2-bladed wooden fixed-pitch propeller

Performance

- Maximum speed: 150 km/h (93 mph, 81 kn)

Armament

- Guns: 1x fixed forward-firing, synchronised 7.92 mm (0.312 in) LMG 08/15 Spandau machine gun; 1x flexibly mounted 7.92 mm (0.312 in) Parabellum MG 14 machine-gun in the rear cockpit.

== Bibliography ==
- Gray, Peter & Thetford, Owen (1987) [1970]. German Aircraft of the First World War (2nd ed.). London: Putnam. ISBN 0-85177-809-7.
- Herris, Jack (2012). German Seaplane Fighters of WWI: A Centennial Perspective on Great War Seaplanes. Great War Aviation Centennial Series. Vol. 2. Charleston (S.C.): Aeronaut Books. ISBN 978-1-935881-09-4.
- Schmeelke, Michael (2020). Zeppelin-Lindau Aircraft of WWI: Claude Dornier's Metal Airplanes 1914–1919. Great War Aviation Centennial Series. Vol. 42. n.p.: Aeronaut Books. ISBN 978-1-935881-83-4.
