= Zeppelin-Staaken =

Former German aircraft manufacturer

Zeppelin-Staaken (sometimes Zeppelin Werke Staaken), was a German aircraft manufacturer originally named Versuchsbau G.m.b.H. Gotha-Ost (Experimental Works Gotha-East (V.G.O.)) when it was formed in mid-1914 by Count Ferdinand von Zeppelin and Robert Bosch. The company rented facilities in Gotha with the objective to build large, long-range bomber aircraft. Alexander Baumann was hired by Zeppelin as the head designer. The company moved to the village of Staaken, near Berlin, in mid-1916 and was renamed Flugzeugwerft G.m.b.H., although it was commonly known as Zeppelin-Staaken.

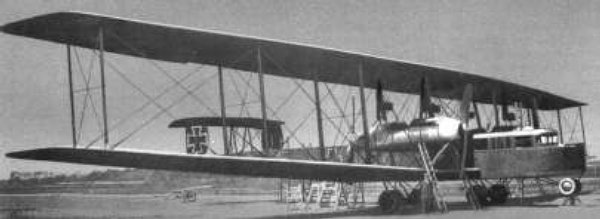
A Zeppelin-Staaken R.VI

== Aircraft built ==
- Zeppelin-Staaken L
- Zeppelin-Staaken VGO.I
- Zeppelin-Staaken VGO.II
- Zeppelin-Staaken VGO.III
- Zeppelin-Staaken R.IV
- Zeppelin-Staaken R.V
- Zeppelin-Staaken R.VI
- Zeppelin-Staaken R.VII
- Zeppelin-Staaken 8301
- Zeppelin-Staaken R.XIV
- Zeppelin-Staaken R.XV
- Zeppelin-Staaken R.XVI
- Zeppelin-Staaken E-4/20

== See also ==
- Riesenflugzeug
