= Riesenflugzeug =

Imperial German bomber class; largest warplanes of World War I

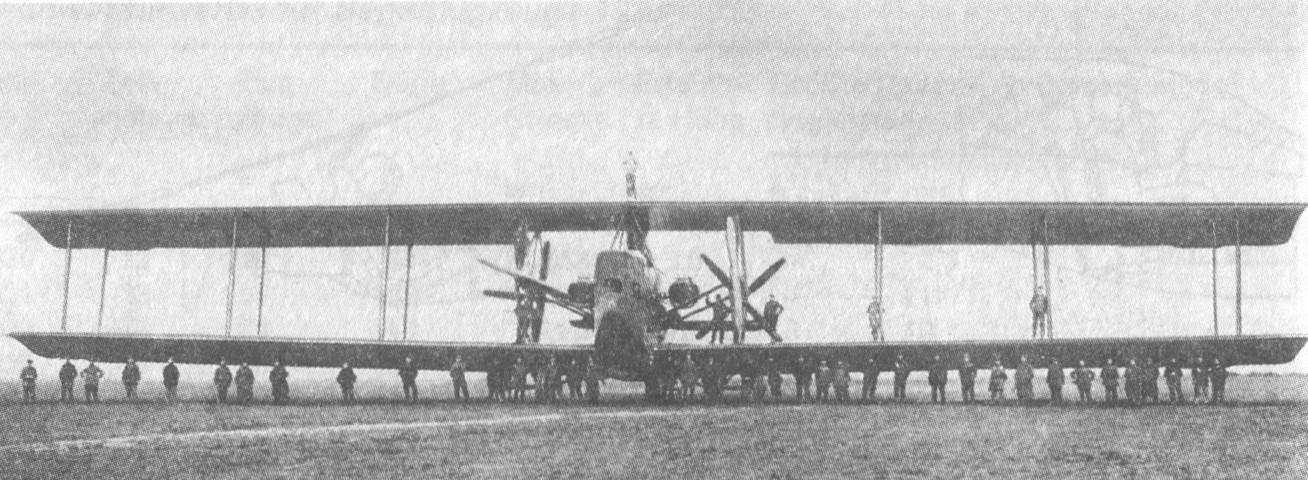
Siemens-Schuckert R.VIII (1918)

A Riesenflugzeug (plural Riesenflugzeuge, German for "giant aircraft"), sometimes colloquially referred to in English as an R-plane, was any member of a class of large World War I German bombers, possessing at least three aircraft engines, although usually four or more engines. These large multi-engine aircraft could fly several hours with larger bomb loads than the smaller Grossflugzeug bombers such as the Gotha G.V.

Some of the earliest Riesenflugzeuge were given G-type designations before being redesignated, but a major distinction was that the requirements for the R-type specified that the engines had to be serviceable in flight. As a result, designs fell into two groups:

- those with the engines mounted centrally inside the fuselage using gearboxes and driveshafts to transfer the power to propellers mounted between the wings, and
- those with conventional powerplant installations mounted in large nacelles or the nose of the aircraft where engineers would be stationed for each group of engines.

The transmission of power from the centrally mounted engines to the remote, most often wing-mounted propellers proved troublesome in practice, and most operational examples of Riesenflugzeug-class aircraft were of the second type, as with the all-direct-drive Zeppelin-Staaken R.VI.

The Idflieg (Inspektion der Fliegertruppen (Inspection of the Air Force), the German Army department responsible for military aviation), assigned the letter R to this type of aircraft, which would then be followed by a period and a Roman numeral type number. Seaplanes were denoted by adding a lowercase "s" after the "R" in the designation.

The Riesenflugzeuge were the largest airplane of World War I. In comparison, the largest equivalent Allied airplane were the Sikorsky Ilya Muromets (Note: The first successful large aircraft, and the inspiration for the German Grossflugzeug and Riesenflugzeuge bombers) with a span of 29.8 m (98 ft), the Caproni Ca.4 with a span of 29.9 m (98 ft), the one-off Felixstowe Fury flying boat with a span of 37.5 m (123 ft) and the Handley Page V/1500 with a span of 38.41 m (126.0 ft). The Riesenflugzeuge that bombed London during the First World War were larger than any of the German bombers in use during the Second World War. (Note: The 50.32 m (165.1 ft) span Junkers Ju 390, was only used as a transport, and the Focke-Wulf Fw 200 Condor, used for maritime operations had a span of 32.85 m (107.8 ft).) The largest built, the Siemens-Schuckert R.VIII of 1918, had a wingspan of 48.0 m (157.5 ft). It was not until sixteen years later that an airplane with a larger wingspan, the Soviet Tupolev Maksim Gorky eight-engined monoplane, was built with a 63.0 m (206.7 ft) wingspan.

The Riesenflugzeuge were operational from 1915 to 1919 and most of them were built as "one-off" aircraft.

== List of aircraft ==
Type	Engines	Span	First flight	Service	Notes	Number built
AEG R.I	4 × 260 hp Mercedes D.IV	36 m (118 ft 1 in)	1916	None	Broke up in flight in 1918	1 completed 7 partially built
DFW R.I	4 × 220 hp Mercedes D.IV	29.5 m (96 ft 9 in)	1916	Eastern front	Crashed on 2nd combat flight	1
DFW R.II	4 × 260 hp Mercedes D.IVa	30.06 m (98 ft 7 in)	1918	Trainer as unsuitable for combat		2 of 6 ordered
DFW R.III	8 × 260 hp Mercedes D.IV	53.5 m (175 ft 6 in)	n/a	None	Incomplete at end of war, cancelled	None
Junkers R.I	4 × 260 hp Mercedes D.IVa	35.0 m (114 ft 10 in)	n/a	None		1 incomplete
LFG Roland R.I	4 × 1000 hp Maybach Mb.IV	n/a	n/a	None		Not built
Linke-Hofmann R.I	4 × 260 hp Mercedes D.IVa	33.2 m (108 ft 11 in)	1917	None	First example had 32.02 m (105 ft 1 in) span	4
Linke-Hofmann R.II	4 × 260 hp Mercedes D.IVa	42.16 m (138 ft 4 in)	1919	None	Used largest single propeller ever built, some 6.9 meters in diameter	2
Mannesmann Giant Triplane	10 × unk. engines	50.3 m (165 ft 0 in)	n/a	None	Cancelled incomplete	None
Schütte-Lanz R.I	6 × 300 hp Basse und Selve BuS.IVa	44.0 m (144 ft 4 in)	n/a	None	Design study only	None
Siemens-Schuckert Forssman R	2 × 110 hp Mercedes D.III & 2 × 220 hp Mercedes D.IVa	24.0 m (78 ft 9 in)	1915	Trainer	After several rebuilds it was accepted by the military in 1916. Scrapped after breaking in two.	1
Siemens-Schuckert R.I	3 × 150 hp Benz Bz.III	28.0 m (91 ft 10 in)	1915	Eastern front & training		1
Siemens-Schuckert R.II	3 × 260 hp Mercedes D.IVa	38.0 m (124 ft 8 in)	1915	Training	Span increased	1
Siemens-Schuckert R.III	3 × 220 hp Benz Bz.IV	34.33 m (112 ft 8 in)	1915	Training		1
Siemens-Schuckert R.IV	3 × 220 hp Benz Bz.IV	37.6 m (123 ft 4 in)	1916	Training	Span increased	1
Siemens-Schuckert R.V	3 × 220 hp Benz Bz.IV	34.33 m (112 ft 8 in)	1916	Eastern front	Span increased	1
Siemens-Schuckert R.VI	3 × 220 hp Benz Bz.IV	33.36 m (109 ft 5 in)	1916	Eastern front	Span increased	1
Siemens-Schuckert R.VII	3 × 260 hp Mercedes D.IVa	38.44 m (126 ft 1 in)	1917	Eastern front		1
Siemens-Schuckert R.VIII	6 × 300 hp Basse und Selve BuS.IVa	48.0 m (157 ft 6 in)	n/a	None		2 (one unfinished)
Siemens-Schuckert R.IX	8 × 300 hp Basse und Selve BuS.IVa	n/a	n/a	None	Design study only	None
Zeppelin-Lindau Rs.I	3 × 240 hp Maybach Mb.IV	43.5 m (142 ft 9 in)	n/a	None	Wrecked unflown, 1915. Flying-boat (Note: developed by Claudius Dornier while working for Zeppelin.)	1
Zeppelin-Lindau Rs.II	3 × 240 hp Maybach Mb.IV	33.2 m (108 ft 11 in)	1916	None	Flying boat	1
Zeppelin-Lindau Rs.III	3 × 245 hp Maybach Mb.IVa	37.0 m (121 ft 5 in)	1917	Evaluation	Flying boat	1
Zeppelin-Lindau Rs.IV	4 × 245 hp Maybach Mb.IVa	37 m (121 ft 5 in)	1918	None	Flying boat	1
Zeppelin-Staaken VGO.I	3 × 240 hp Maybach HS or 5 × 245 hp Maybach Mb.IVa	42.2 m (138 ft 5 in) (Note: The essentially same wing structure was used for nearly all 42.2 meter wingspan Zeppelin R-series aircraft.)	1915	Kaiserliche Marine	Built at Versuchsbau Gotha Ost (Note: Built at Versuchsbau Gotha Ost to Zeppelin design)	1
Zeppelin-Staaken VGO.II	3 × 240 hp Maybach HS	42.2 m (138 ft 5 in)	1915	Eastern front & trainer		1
Zeppelin-Staaken VGO.III	6 × 160 hp Mercedes D.III	42.2 m (138 ft 5 in)	1916	Eastern front		1
Zeppelin-Staaken R.IV	2 × 160 hp Mercedes D.III & 4 × 220 hp Benz Bz.IV	42.2 m (138 ft 5 in)	1916	Eastern front & Western front		1
Zeppelin-Staaken R.V	5 × 245 hp Maybach Mb.IVa	42.2 m (138 ft 5 in)	1916	Western front		1
Zeppelin-Staaken R.VI	4 × 260 hp Mercedes D.IVa	42.2 m (138 ft 5 in)	1916	Western front		18
Zeppelin-Staaken R.VII	2 × 160 hp Mercedes D.III & 4 × 220 hp Benz Bz.IV	42.2 m (138 ft 5 in)	1917	None	Wrecked during flight to the front.	1
Zeppelin-Staaken R.VIII	8 × 260 hp Mercedes D.IVa or 8 × 245 hp Maybach Mb.IVa	55 m (180 ft 5 in)	1918	None	Unfinished	1 incomplete
Zeppelin-Staaken R.IX	8 × 260 hp Mercedes D.IVa or 8 × 245 hp Maybach Mb.IVa	55 m (180 ft 5 in)	1918	None	Unfinished	1 incomplete
Zeppelin-Staaken R.XIV	5 × 245 hp Maybach Mb.IVa	42.2 m (138 ft 5 in)	1918	Western front		3
Zeppelin-Staaken R.XIVa	5 × 245 hp Maybach Mb.IVa	42.2 m (138 ft 5.5in)	?	Post-war	Seized while smuggling	1
Zeppelin-Staaken R.XV	5 × 245 hp Maybach Mb.IVa	42.2 m (138 ft 5.5in)	1918	Western front		2
Zeppelin-Staaken R.XVI	2 × 530 hp Benz Bz.VI & 2 × 220 hp Benz Bz.IV	42.2 m (138 ft 5 in)	1918	Airliner	Two completed, 3rd unfinished (Note: One built during war which did not see any service. One was never completed. One was built as a civilian airliner)	3 (one unfinished)
Zeppelin-Staaken L	4 × 245 hp Maybach Mb.IVa	42.2 m (138 ft 5 in)	?	None	Floatplane variant. Wrecked in trials. (Note: Built for Kaiserliche Marine)	1
Zeppelin-Staaken Type 8301	4 × 245 hp Maybach Mb.IVa	42.2 m (138 ft 5 in)	?	floatplane airliner	3 built for Kaiserliche Marine	3
