= Siemens-Schuckert R.VIII =

German bomber aircraft built in 1916

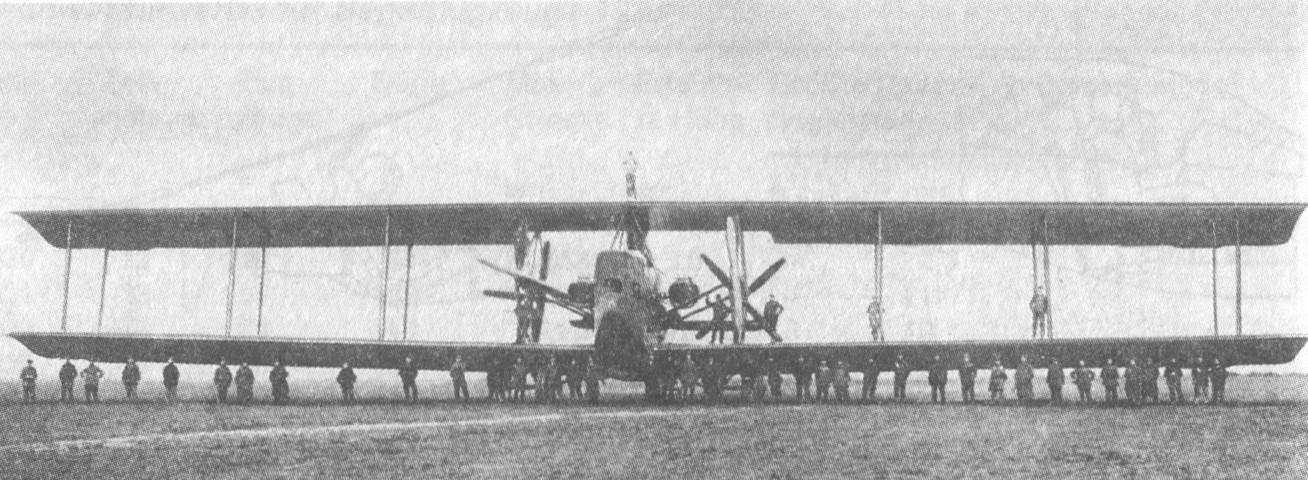

General information
- Type: Bomber
- National origin: Germany
- Manufacturer: Siemens-Schuckert (Siemens-Schuckert Werke G.m.b.H., Siemensstadt. Berlin)
- Number built: 2 (one unfinished)

The Siemens-Schuckert R.VIII was a bomber aircraft designed and built in Germany from 1916.

== Design and development ==
Having built the Steffen R series, Siemens-Schuckert planned to produce a six-engined Riesenflugzeug (giant aeroplane) for the Fliegertruppen des deutschen Kaiserreiches (Imperial German Flying Corps). In common with many of the other contemporary R projects, the R.VIII had all six engines inside the fuselage, where they were tended by mechanics, driving two tractor and two pusher propellers mounted between the mainplanes, via leather cone clutches combining gearboxes, shafts and bevel gearboxes. Two aircraft were built but only the first, R23/16, was completed.

Ground trials began in 1919, after the armistice but were interrupted by a gearbox failure which resulted in a propeller breaking up and causing extensive damage. The second airframe, R24/16, was never completed and the first was not repaired after the ground running accident due to the restrictions of the Treaty of Versailles. At the time of its completion the Siemens-Schuckert R.VIII was the largest aeroplane in the world; (the Mannesman-Poll triplane was to have been much larger but was not completed before the Versailles Treaty came into force).

== Specifications (Siemens-Schuckert R.VIII) ==
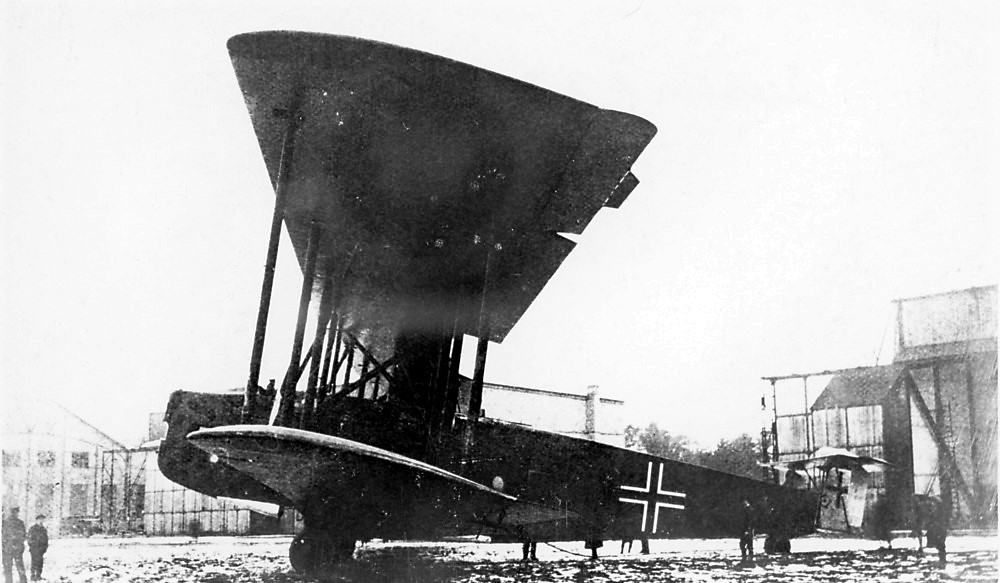

Data from The German Giants and German aircraft of the First World War.

General characteristics

- Crew: 6+
- Length: 21.6 m (70 ft 10 in)
- Wingspan: 48 m (157 ft 6 in)
- Height: 7.4 m (24 ft 3 in)
- Wing area: 440 m^{2} (4,700 sq ft)
- Empty weight: 10,478 kg (23,100 lb)
- Gross weight: 15,867 kg (34,980 lb)
- Powerplant: 6 × Basse und Selve BuS.IVa 6-cyl. water-cooled in-line piston engines, 220 kW (300 hp) each
- Propellers: tractor 900 rpm - 2 bladed, pusher 700 rpm - 4-bladed

Performance

- Maximum speed: 125 km/h (78 mph, 67 kn) (estimated)
- Range: 900 km (560 mi, 490 nmi) (estimated)
- Service ceiling: 4,000 m (13,000 ft) (estimated)
- Wing loading: 35 kg/m^{2} (7.2 lb/sq ft)
- Cost 750,000 Marks

== See also ==
Related development

- Siemens-Schuckert R.I to R.VII

Aircraft of comparable role, configuration, and era

- AEG R.I
- DFW R.I
- DFW R.II
- DFW R.III
- Linke-Hoffman R.I
- Linke-Hofmann R.II
- Poll Triplane
- Zeppelin-Staaken R.XVI

== Bibliography ==
- Haddow, G. W. & Grosz, Peter M. The German Giants, The Story of the R-planes 1914–1919. London. Putnam. 1963.
- Gray, Peter & Thetford, Owen. German Aircraft of the First World War. London, Putnam. ISBN 0-370-00103-6
- Sollinger, Guenther, "Villehad Forssman: Constructing German Bombers 1914–1918. Moscow, Rusavia, 2009.
