= Zeppelin-Staaken R.V =

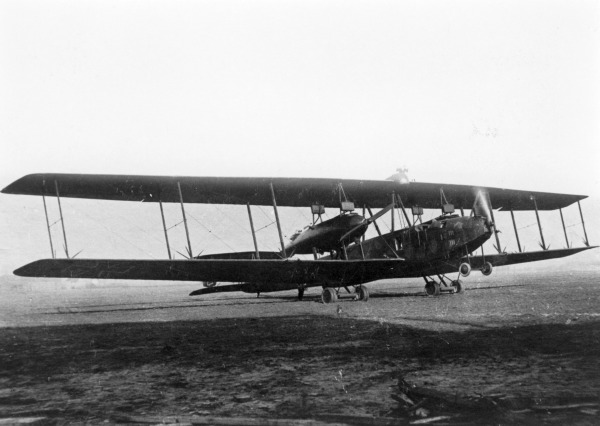
- R.V 13/15, shown with two-bladed propeller on the nose engine.

General information
- Type: Bomber
- National origin: Germany
- Manufacturer: Schütte-Lanz
- Designer: Graf von Zeppelin
- Primary user: Luftstreitkräfte
- Number built: 1

History
- First flight: 1917
- Variants: Zeppelin-Staaken R.VII, Zeppelin-Staaken R.XIV, Zeppelin-Staaken R.XV, Zeppelin-Staaken R.XVI,

The Zeppelin-Staaken R.V was one of a series of large bombers called Riesenflugzeugen, intended to be less vulnerable than the rigid airships in use at the time.

== Development ==
In 1916, Zeppelin moved development of large bombers to Staaken, Germany. The R.V was co-developed alongside the R.VI and R.VII. The R.V had two engine pods, each with two engines paired in tandem, driving single propellers through clutches, gearboxes and shafts. An additional tractor engine was also fitted in the nose of the fuselage. The pods were large enough for some inflight maintenance. The Model R.IV was selected for production, rather than the R.V, because the geared and clutched engines posed a higher developmental risk. Each R-series aircraft required a ground-crew of 50.

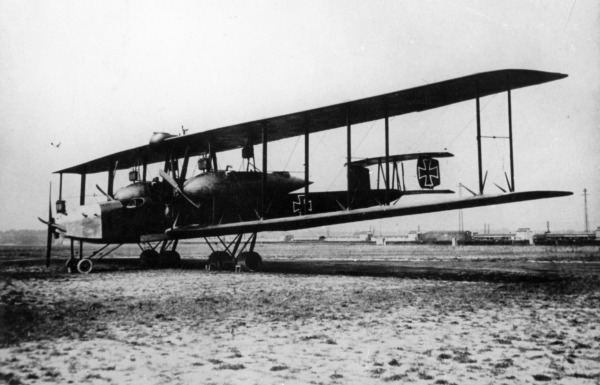
An early photograph of R.V 13/15, showing the original four-bladed propellers

== Operational history ==
The sole R.V (R.V 13/15) was accepted into service with Rfa 501 (Riesenflugzeug Abteilung 501) on 23 December 1917, after a protracted development period, due to teething troubles with the engine transmission systems. After an initial operational mission on 25 January 1918, fifteen further operational missions were flown in eight months of service, before an emergency landing in fog ended its career on 18 October 1918.

== Operators ==
- German Empire
- Rfa 501

== Specifications (Zeppelin-Staaken R.V) ==
Data from

General characteristics

- Crew: seven
- Length: 23 m (75 ft 6 in)
- Wingspan: 42.2 m (138 ft 5 in)
- Height: 6.3 m (20 ft 8 in)
- Wing area: 332 m^{2} (3,570 sq ft)
- Empty weight: 9,450 kg (20,834 lb)
- Gross weight: 13,010 kg (28,682 lb)
- Useful load: 3,560 kg (7,850 lb)
- Powerplant: 5 × Maybach Mb.IVa 6-cyl. water-cooled in-line piston engines, 183 kW (245 hp) each

Performance

- Maximum speed: 135 km/h (84 mph, 73 kn)
- Endurance: 7 hours
- Service ceiling: 4,500 m (14,800 ft) approx.
- Time to altitude:
  - 1,000 m (3,300 ft) in 10 minutes.
  - 2,000 m (6,600 ft) in 22 minutes.
  - 3,000 m (9,800 ft) in 34 minutes.
- Wing loading: 42 kg/m^{2} (8.6 lb/sq ft)

Armament

- Guns: 5 x machine-guns in dorsal, ventral, upper wing and two nacelle positions
