= Linke-Hofmann R.II =

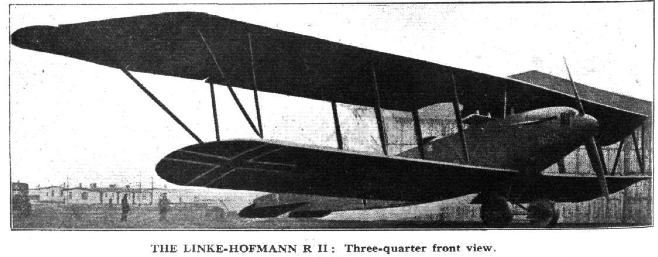
- Linke-Hofmann R.II, note the size of the figures compared to the aircraft

General information
- Type: Bomber
- National origin: German Empire
- Manufacturer: Linke-Hofmann
- Designer: Paul Stumpf
- Number built: 2

History
- First flight: 1919

The Linke-Hofmann R.II (Riesenflugzeug – "giant aircraft") was a bomber aircraft designed and built in Germany from 1917.

== Design and development ==
The Linke-Hofmann R.I had disappointing performance and handling, as well as structural weakness with both prototypes crashing. Linke-Hofmann took a radically different approach for their second Riesenflugzeug, the Linke-Hofmann R.II. The R.II was an approximately three-fold scale-up of a conventional single-engined biplane, powered by a quartet of Mercedes D.IVa inline-six engines turning a single 6.90 meter (22 ft 7.5 in) diameter tractor propeller, the largest single propeller ever used to propel any aircraft in aviation history. The quartet of Mercedes powerplants were arranged in pairs in the central fuselage and drove the propeller through clutches, shafts and gearboxes. The Linke-Hofmann R.II, probably the largest single propeller driven aircraft that will ever be built, had a wing span of 41.16 m (135 ft 0 in), length of 23.3 m (76 ft 5 in) and height of 7.1 m (23 ft 4 in). (Note: As a comparison, the Boeing B-29 Superfortress heavy bomber of World War II had a wingspan of around 43 m (141 ft 1 in).)

The airframe was constructed largely of wood, with plywood covering the forward fuselage and a steel-tube v-strut chassis main undercarriage with two wheels and a tail-skid at the aft end of the fuselage. Two examples of the R.II had been completed by the time of the Armistice. They bore the IdFlieg German military registration numbers R.55/17 and R.56/17.

Flight testing of R 55/17 was carried out after the Armistice in 1919, demonstrating acceptable performance and handling, being able to fly happily with only two engines driving the enormous propeller. Normal endurance was estimated to be 7 hours, but with adjustment of load and a cruising speed of 74 mph (119 km/h) it was estimated that the R.II could stay aloft for 30 hours.

There were plans to make it a 12-passenger airliner after the war, but the restrictions of the Versailles Treaty ended further development.

== Specifications (Linke-Hofmann R.II) ==
Data from German Aircraft of the First World War, The German Giants – The German R-Planes 1914–1918

General characteristics

- Crew: 6+
- Capacity: planned airliner variant was to seat 12
- Length: 20.32 m (66 ft 8 in)
- Upper wingspan: 42.16 m (138 ft 4 in)
- Lower wingspan: 33.96 m (111 ft 5 in)
- Height: 7.1 m (23 ft 4 in)
- Wing area: 320 m^{2} (3,400 sq ft)
- Empty weight: 8,000 kg (17,637 lb)
- Gross weight: 12,000 kg (26,455 lb)
- Useful load: 7,000 kg (15,432 lb)
- Powerplant: 4 × Mercedes D.IVa 6-cylinder water-cooled in-line piston engines, 190 kW (260 hp) each
- Propellers: 2-bladed Garuda fixed-pitch propeller, 6.9 m (22 ft 8 in) diameter driven by all four engines through clutches, gearboxes and shafts at 545 rpm

Performance

- Maximum speed: 130 km/h (81 mph, 70 kn)
- Endurance: 7 hours
- Service ceiling: 3,200 m (10,500 ft)
- Time to altitude:

- 1,000 m (3,300 ft) in 8 minutes
- 2,000 m (6,600 ft) in 20 minutes
- 3,000 m (9,800 ft) in 45 minutes
- 3,200 m (10,500 ft) in 120 minutes

- Wing loading: 37.8 kg/m^{2} (7.7 lb/sq ft)

Armament

- Guns: provision for 2 x dorsal and 1 x ventral machine-guns
- Bombs: up to 700 kg (1,543 lb) of bombs

== See also ==
Aircraft of comparable role, configuration, and era

- Siemens-Schuckert R.VIII Steffen
- Zeppelin-Staaken R.VI

Related lists

- List of aircraft
