= Zeppelin-Staaken VGO.I =

German heavy bomber aircraft of World War I

VGO.I
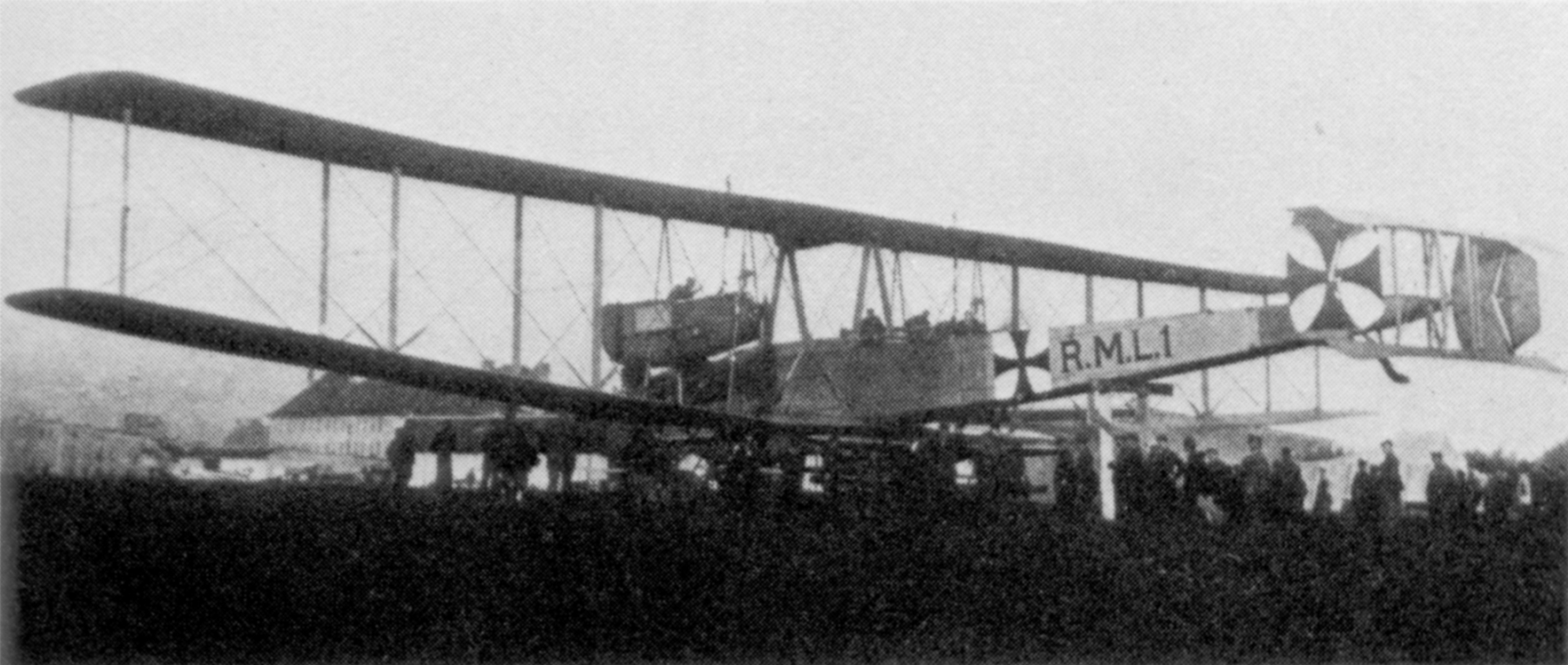

General information
- Type: Heavy bomber
- National origin: Germany
- Manufacturer: Zeppelin-Staaken
- Primary user: Imperial German Navy
- Number built: 1

History
- First flight: 11 April 1915
- Developed into: Zeppelin-Staaken VGO.II; Zeppelin-Staaken VGO.III; Zeppelin-Staaken R.IV

The Zeppelin-Staaken VGO.I, redesignated Zeppelin-Staaken RML.1 in naval service, was a heavy bomber built in Germany in 1915 and which saw limited service during World War I. Although only one example was built, it served as a prototype for further Riesenflugzeuge ("giant aircraft") by Zeppelin-Staaken. Its "VGO" designation was assigned because the aircraft was constructed by Versuchsbau Gotha-Ost, a division of Gothaer Waggonfabrik. At the time of its construction, it was the largest plane in the world.

== Design ==
The VGO.I was a four-bay, equal-span biplane with slightly negative wing stagger. Of mostly conventional configuration it diverged most noticeably from the designs of the day not only by its size, but by its biplane horizontal stabilisers, its two fins, and its tricycle undercarriage. Its two pilots sat in an open cockpit, and the crew also included a mechanic for each of its three engines, and two machine-gunners. One engine was mounted in the nose, driving a tractor propeller, and the other two were mounted in nacelles in the interplane gap and drove pusher propellers. These nacelles were large enough to accommodate a mechanic, who could make his way into them in flight (a requirement of the Riesenflugzeuge specification). The fuselage included a bomb bay large enough to carry a 1,000-kilogram (2,200 lb) bomb. As defensive armament, the VGO.I carried two machine guns in the fuselage, one firing upward and the other downward. Later, machine guns would also be fitted to the fronts of the engine nacelles.

The design proved very underpowered, and two more engines were eventually added, one to each nacelle. The two engines in each nacelle were geared together to drive a common propeller.

The structure was a mixture of wood and welded steel tube, covered in canvas. Late in its service life, some of the canvas covering was replaced by cellon to help reduce the aircraft's visibility.

== Development ==
Around the outbreak of World War I, Count Ferdinand von Zeppelin became interested in the potential of a very large aeroplane to overcome the operational limitations of the airships for which he and his company were famous. He was aware of a pre-war project by Hellmuth Hirth and Gustav Klein to build a giant biplane with transatlantic range, and recruited them to work on building an aircraft that could carry a 1,000-kilogram (2,200 lb) bomb over a range of 600 kilometres (370 mi). With Robert Bosch, Zeppelin financed the Versuchsbau Gotha-Ost venture, and appointed Professor Alexander Baumann to lead the project. From the outset, this was a private venture, but Zeppelin soon secured the interest and support of both the Army and the Navy. At the same time the War Office opposed the project.

Design work began in September 1914 and was complete by December. Construction was delayed in January 1915 because the Maybach HS engines were not yet ready. The aircraft first flew on 11 April 1915 and on 6 June was flown to the Maybach factory in Friedrichshafen for testing by the Imperial German Navy. The HS engine was a new design, and its unreliability proved a constant problem, culminating in a forced landing at Geroldsgrün on 15 December after two of the three engines failed in flight due to failures in their oil supply lines. The heavily damaged aircraft was salvaged and taken back to Gotha.

The VGO.I was rebuilt with many modifications. These included redesigned engine nacelles that incorporated a gunner's position in their fronts, and a redesigned and enlarged tail to improve directional control. Both were changes that had already been incorporated into the VGO.II design. Improved cooling for the still-troublesome HS engines was also provided. In this new form, it flew again on 16 February 1916 and was accepted for naval service by June.

== Operational history ==
The VGO.1 received the designation RML.1, for Reichs Marine Landflugzeuge (Imperial Navy landplane) and a unit, Kommando RLM.1, was established to test it in combat on the Eastern front. The RML.1 was deployed to Auce in June 1916, but due to a series of engine and undercarriage failures that aviation historian Jack Herris called "a tragicomedy of errors", did not reach there until the end of July. In mid August, the RML.1 flew a series of raids. On 15 August, it attacked the railway terminal at Sloka. The next day, it attacked the Russian air station at Läbara, and the day after that, the air station at Ruhnu Island and a troop encampment at Kemeri. A second raid on Kemeri was to take place on 24 August but was aborted due to an overheating engine.

On 1 September, two engines failed in quick succession while the RML.1 was outbound on a night raid. The pilots guided it to a forced landing in a pine forest. The fuselage was salvaged and sent back to Staaken, but Kommando RML.1 was disestablished, and its personnel reassigned. The aircraft itself was rebuilt again, with new wings and engines. This time, five Maybach Mb.IVa engines were installed, each with a similar power output to the original HS engines. One engine was installed in the nose, as before, but the other four were installed two to each nacelle, geared together to drive a common propeller. During this rebuild, some of the fuselage covering was replaced with cellon, as part of a Unsichtbare Flugzeug (invisible aircraft) test, intended to reduce the visibility of large aircraft. A completely new tail was built, mounted higher on the fuselage, and this was also covered in cellon.

The newly rebuilt VGO.I flew on 10 March 1917, but suffered an engine failure in the port nacelle after an explosion. As its pilots brought it back to the airfield, they needed to use hard rudder to balance the asymmetrical thrust. Unfortunately, a problem with the rudder pedals jamming at high deflections that had been noted in ground tests had not yet been corrected. As a result, once on the ground and with its rudders jammed, the VGO.I could not be steered, and collided with the side of a hangar. One pilot was killed instantly, and the other died a few hours later. The VGO.I was not rebuilt again.

== Operators ==
Imperial German Navy
Kommando RML.1

== Specifications (after first rebuild) ==
Data from Kroschel & Stützer 1994, p.133, and as noted

General characteristics

- Crew: Six
- Length: 24 m (78 ft 9 in)
- Wingspan: 42.2 m (138 ft 5 in)
- Height: 6.6 m (21 ft 8 in)
- Wing area: 332 m^{2} (3,570 sq ft)
- Empty weight: 6,520 kg (14,374 lb)
- Gross weight: 9,520 kg (20,988 lb)
- Powerplant: 3 × Maybach HS six-cylinder, water-cooled, inline piston engine, 177 kW (237 hp) each (240 PS each)

Performance

- Maximum speed: 110 km/h (68 mph, 59 kn)
- Service ceiling: 3,000 m (9,800 ft)
- Time to altitude: 2,000 metres (6,600 ft) in 39 minutes
  3,000 metres (9,800 ft) in 79 minutes

Armament

- Guns: 4 × 7.92-millimetre (0.312 in) Parabellum MG 14 machine guns
- Bombs: 1,000 kilograms (2,200 lb) bombs

== Notes ==
=== Bibliography ===
- Cooksley, Peter (2000). German Bombers of WWI in Action. Carrollton, Texas: Squadron/Signal.
- Gray, Peter; Thetford, Owen (1992). German Aircraft of the First World War. London: Putnam.
- Haddow, George William; Grosz, Peter M. (1988). The German giants: the story of the R-Planes 1914–1919. London: Putnam.
- Herris, Jack (2020). Zeppelin-Staaken Aircraft of WWI: Volume 1: VGO.1 – R.VI R.29/16. Reno, Nevada: Aeronaut.
- Kroschel, Günter; Stützer, Helmut (1994). Die deutschen Militärflugzeuge 1910–1918 [German military aircraft 1910–1918] (in German). Augsburg: E. S. Mittler & Sohn.
- Szigeti, Martin (2007). "Geburtsstunde der Giganten" [Birth of the Giants]. Klassiker der Luftfahrt (in German). No. 4/07. Stuttgart: Motor Presse Stuttgart. pp. 10–17.
