= Zeppelin-Staaken Type 8301 =

German heavy patrol floatplane of World War I

Type 8301

General information
- Type: Patrol aircraft
- National origin: Germany
- Manufacturer: Zeppelin-Staaken
- Primary user: Imperial German Navy
- Number built: 4

History
- First flight: Summer 1918
- Developed from: Zeppelin-Staaken R.VI; Zeppelin-Staaken L

The Zeppelin-Staaken Type 8301 was a class of four large seaplanes, serialled 8301–8304, (Note: Gray and Thetford state that the existence of 8302 has not been confirmed. However, Haddow and Grosz report this aircraft being tested at Warnemünde in late 1918. This article follows Haddow and Grosz.) constructed for the Imperial German Navy during World War I. They are the largest (although not the heaviest) floatplanes ever constructed.

== Design ==
Based on the experience of testing the Zeppelin-Staaken Type L, the Kaiserliche Marine ordered these aircraft in two batches, 8301 and 8302 in December 1917, followed by a batch of four, 8303 to 8306 in January 1918.

Zeppelin-Staaken used R.VI wings mated to an all-new fuselage, suspended midway between the mainplanes. Raising the fuselage this way was intended to improve the aircraft's seakeeping characteristics. The aircraft was fitted with large cellon windows that wrapped all the way around the nose, providing excellent visibility. Apart from the same machine-gun defensive armament fitted to Zeppelin-Staaken bombers, provision was made for two 20-millimetre (0.79 in) cannons in the rear fuselage, to be used for anti-ship purposes. The bomb load amounted to ten 10-kilogram (22 lb) bombs stored in canisters alongside the nose. Twelve 300-litre (66 imp gal; 79 US gal) fuel tanks gave the aircraft an endurance of 9–10 hours.

The tailplanes were based on those of the R.XIV and R.XV, and the aircraft was fitted with floats similar to the Type L.

== Development ==
8301 made its first flight in mid-1918, tested initially with a land undercarriage before being fitted with floats made of duralumin. Naval trials of 8301 and 8302 at Warnemünde were underway at the time the war ended, and before these aircraft had been accepted for naval service.

Of the second batch, only 8203 and 8204 had been constructed but not yet delivered. The Military Inter-Allied Commission of Control discovered them in Zeppelin-Staaken's seaplane hangar at Wildpark near Potsdam.

== Operational history ==
Although never ready for wartime service, 8301 (and possibly 8303 and 8304) found brief postwar use as airliners, ferrying passengers on weekend trips between Berlin and Swinemünde.

== Specifications ==
Data from Kroschel & Stützer 1994, p.165

General characteristics

- Crew: Five
- Length: 21 m (68 ft 11 in)
- Wingspan: 42.2 m (138 ft 5 in)
- Height: 6.8 m (22 ft 4 in)
- Wing area: 340 m^{2} (3,700 sq ft)
- Empty weight: 9,000 kg (19,842 lb)
- Gross weight: 12,500 kg (27,558 lb)
- Powerplant: 4 × Mercedes D.IVa six-cylinder, water-cooled, inline piston engines, 191 kW (256 hp) each (260 PS each)

Performance

- Maximum speed: 130 km/h (81 mph, 70 kn)
- Range: 1,300 km (810 mi, 700 nmi)
- Time to altitude: 3,000 metres (9,800 ft) in 54 minutes

Armament

- Guns: 2 × 7.92-millimetre (0.312 in) Parabellum MG 14 machine guns
- Bombs: 350 kilograms (770 lb) bombs

== Notes ==
=== Bibliography ===
- Andersson, Lennart & Sanger, Ray (2014). Retribution and Recovery: German Aircraft and Aviation 1919 to 1922. Staplefield, UK: Air-Britain (Historians). ISBN 978-0-85130-467-0.
- Gray, Peter; Thetford, Owen (1992). German Aircraft of the First World War. London: Putnam.
- Haddow, George William; Grosz, Peter M. (1988). The German giants: the story of the R-Planes 1914–1919. London: Putnam.
- Herris, Jack (2020). Zeppelin-Staaken Aircraft of WWI: Volume 2: R.VI R.30 – E.4/20. Reno, Nevada: Aeronaut.
- Kroschel, Günter; Stützer, Helmut (1994). Die deutschen Militärflugzeuge 1910–1918 [German military aircraft 1910–1918] (in German). Augsburg: E. S. Mittler & Sohn.
