= DFW R.II =

R.II
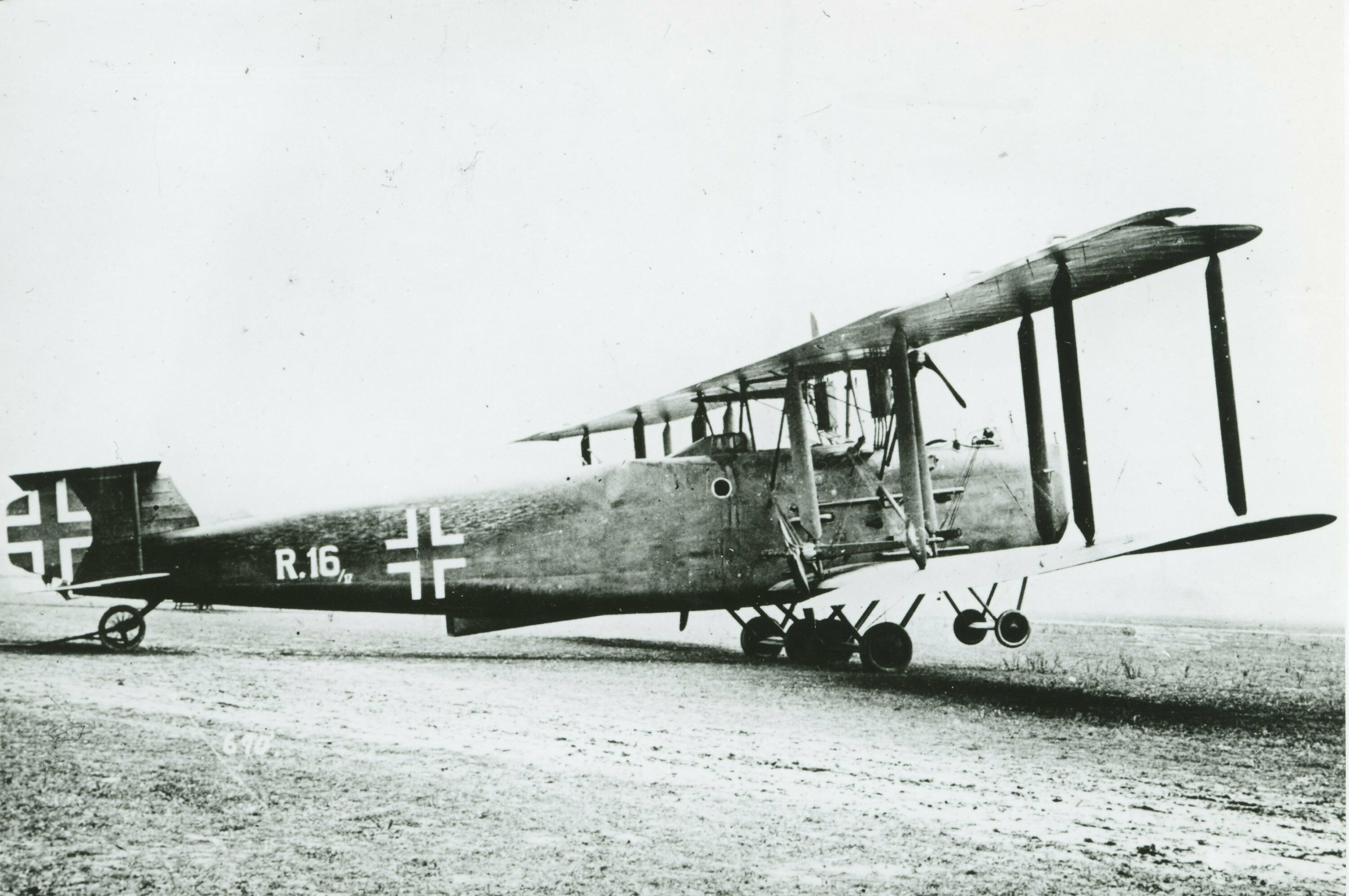

General information
- Type: Bomber
- Manufacturer: DFW
- Primary user: Luftstreitkräfte
- Number built: 3

History
- First flight: 17 September 1917

The DFW R.II (company designation T26 II) was a heavy bomber (Riesenflugzeug) aircraft designed by the Deutsche Flugzeug-Werke (DFW) during the First World War for the Imperial German Army's (Deutsches Heer) Imperial German Air Service (Luftstreitkräfte). Six aircraft were ordered in late 1916; of these three were completed, two were unfinished when the war ended in November 1918 and the last was cancelled. None of the aircraft flew any combat missions.

== Design and development ==
The Imperial German Air Service wanted an improved version of the R.I with a greater payload. The same arrangement of four inline engines mounted in the fuselage, driving two tractor propellers and two pusher propellers via long driveshafts was used. Having learned from the experiences with the R.I, the engine mounts of the R.II were built from pressed steel integrated with the fuselage frames. The shorter crankshafts of the 260-horsepower (190 kW) Mercedes D.IVa straight-six piston engines in the R.II did not cause any new problems, but the aircraft still had vibration problems. These were traced to the high rotational speeds of the driveshafts; they were enclosed within stiffener tubes with ball bearings, which fixed the problem.

== Operational history ==
Of the six ordered by the Luftstreitkräfte, only three were completed before the end of the war. The first aircraft was delivered to the R-plane Training Unit (Riesenflugzeugeersatzabteilung) at Cologne on 1 April 1918 where it flew training missions for the rest of the war because its performance, reliability and load-carrying capability were significantly inferior to the Zeppelin-Staaken aircraft like the R.VI. The second aircraft was ready for operational service in October and the third made its first flight on 22 July. Following the war, DFW planned to convert the two unfinished aircraft into airliners which would have carried 24 passengers, but the aircraft were scrapped instead.

== Specifications R.II (15/16) ==
Data from DFW Aircraft of WWI: A Centennial Perspective on Great War Airplanes; The German Giants: The German R-Planes 1914–1918

General characteristics

- Crew: 5
- Length: 20.93 m (68 ft 8 in)
- Upper wingspan: 35.06 m (115 ft 0 in)
- Height: 6.4 m (21 ft 0 in)
- Wing area: 266 m^{2} (2,860 sq ft)
- Empty weight: 8,634 kg (19,035 lb)
- Gross weight: 11,693 kg (25,779 lb)
- Fuel capacity: 2,450 litres (540 imp gal; 650 US gal)
- Powerplant: 4 × Mercedes D.IVa water-cooled straight-six piston engines, 190 kW (260 hp) each
- Propellers: 2-bladed, 3.5 m (11 ft 6 in) diameter

Performance

- Maximum speed: 135 km/h (84 mph, 73 kn)
- Time to altitude: 58 minutes to 2,000 m (6,600 ft)
- Wing loading: 44 kg/m^{2} (9.0 lb/sq ft)

Armament
Positions for nose, ventral and dorsal gunners

== See also ==
Related development

- DFW R.I
- DFW R.III

Aircraft of comparable role, configuration, and era

- Bristol Braemar

Related lists

- List of World War I Central Powers aircraft, Germany

== Bibliography ==
- Gray, Peter & Thetford, Owen (1987) [1970]. German Aircraft of the First World War (2nd ed.). London: Putnam. ISBN 0-85177-809-7.
- Haddow, G.W. & Grosz, Peter M. (1988). The German Giants: The German R-Planes 1914-1918 (3rd ed.). London: Putnam. ISBN 0-85177-812-7.
- Herris, Jack (2017). DFW Aircraft of WWI: A Centennial Perspective on Great War Airplanes. Great War Aviation Centennial Series. Vol. 29. n.p.: Aeronaut Books. ISBN 978-1-935881-54-4.
