= Zeppelin-Staaken VGO.III =

German heavy bomber aircraft of World War I

VGO.III
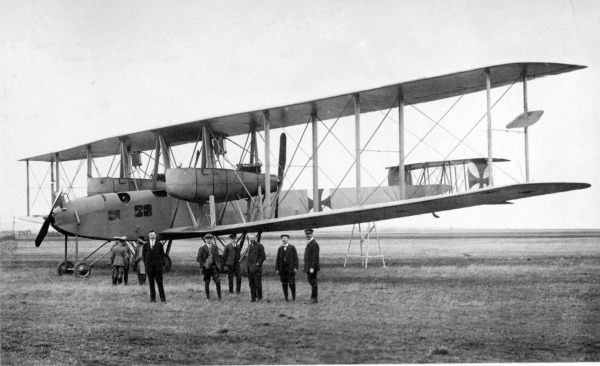

General information
- Type: Heavy bomber
- National origin: Germany
- Manufacturer: Zeppelin-Staaken
- Primary user: Imperial German Army Air Service
- Number built: 1

History
- First flight: Mid 1916
- Developed from: Zeppelin-Staaken VGO.I; Zeppelin-Staaken VGO.II
- Developed into: Zeppelin-Staaken R.IV

The Zeppelin-Staaken VGO.III was a heavy bomber built in Germany in 1916 and which saw limited service during World War I. Although only one example was built, it served as a prototype for further Riesenflugzeuge ("giant aircraft") by Zeppelin-Staaken. Its "VGO" designation was assigned because the aircraft was constructed by Versuchsbau Gotha-Ost, a division of Gothaer Waggonfabrik. It was developed from the VGO.I that had been purchased by the Imperial German Navy, but the VGO.III was purchased by the Army instead. It was the first six-engined aircraft in the world.

== Design ==
The VGO.III was based on its VGO.I and VGO.II predecessors. It shared their wing design, and, with some modifications, their fuselage design as well. Its tail unit was similar to that of the VGO.II. Overall, it was a four-bay, equal-span biplane with slightly negative wing stagger. Of mostly conventional configuration it diverged most noticeably from the designs of the day not only by its size, but by its biplane horizontal stabilisers, its two fins, and its tricycle undercarriage. Its two pilots sat in an open cockpit.

Its most innovative feature was its engine installation. The VGO.I and VGO.II had been plagued by being underpowered. The VGO.III attempted to solve this problem by doubling the number of engines from three to six, and by replacing their troublesome Maybach HS engines for more proven Mercedes D.III units. In each location where its predecessors had mounted an engine, the VGO.III mounted a pair. The power of each pair was combined by a gearbox and clutch to drive a single propeller, meaning that if one of the pair failed, it could be disengaged so that the surviving engine could continue to power the propeller.

One pair of engines was mounted in the nose, driving a tractor propeller, and the other two pairs were mounted in nacelles in the interplane gap and drove pusher propellers. These nacelles were large enough to accommodate a mechanic, who could make his way into them in flight (a requirement of the Riesenflugzeuge specification). The fuselage included a bomb bay large enough to carry a 800-kilogram (1,800 lb) bomb. As defensive armament, the VGO.III carried two machine guns in the fuselage, one firing upward and the other downward, plus a machine gun in the front of each engine nacelle.

Also unusual for the time was the inclusion of a radio set, comprising a Siemens-Schuckert transmitter and Telefunken receiver.

== Development ==
Construction of the VGO.III began in October 1915, and although the date of its first flight is not now known, it took place between 29 May and 4 June 1916. It was accepted into Army service on 28 August and assigned the Idflieg serial R.10/15.

During test-flying, aerodynamic balances for the ailerons were installed on the interplane struts to lighten control loads, but these proved ineffective and were later removed.

== Operational history ==
The VGO.III was assigned to Rfa 500 (Riesenflugzeugabteilung, "giant aeroplane unit") and flew around seven combat missions, targeting railway facilities, troop encampments, and depots around Riga. Its final mission, a training flight on 24 January 1917, ended in disaster. As the VGO.III landed at Auce, it was caught in a sudden downdraft which caused it to land short. The forward undercarriage struck an obstacle, and caused the aircraft to break up. Fuel from ruptured lines sprayed onto the nose exhaust stacks, causing the wreck to catch fire. Five crew members were killed in the first fatal accident involving an R-plane.

== Operators ==
Imperial German Army Air Service
Rfa 500

== Specifications ==
Data from Kroschel & Stützer 1994, p.141, and as noted

General characteristics

- Crew: Six
- Length: 24.50 m (80 ft 5 in)
- Wingspan: 42.2 m (138 ft 5 in)
- Height: 6.8 m (22 ft 4 in)
- Wing area: 332 m^{2} (3,570 sq ft)
- Empty weight: 8,600 kg (18,960 lb)
- Gross weight: 11,600 kg (25,574 lb)
- Powerplant: 6 × Mercedes D.III six-cylinder, water-cooled, inline piston engine, mounted in pairs, 118 kW (158 hp) each (160 PS each)

Performance

- Maximum speed: 100 km/h (62 mph, 54 kn)
- Range: 600 km (370 mi, 320 nmi)
- Service ceiling: 3,000 m (9,800 ft)
- Time to altitude: 1,000 metres (3,300 ft) in 6 minutes
  2,000 metres (6,600 ft) in 29 minutes
  3,000 metres (9,800 ft) in 56 minutes

Armament

- Guns: 4 × 7.92-millimetre (0.312 in) Parabellum MG 14 machine guns
- Bombs: 800 kilograms (1,800 lb) bombs

== Notes ==
=== Bibliography ===
- Cooksley, Peter (2000). German Bombers of WWI in Action. Carrollton, Texas: Squadron/Signal.
- Gray, Peter; Thetford, Owen (1992). German Aircraft of the First World War. London: Putnam.
- Haddow, George William; Grosz, Peter M. (1988). The German giants: the story of the R-Planes 1914–1919. London: Putnam.
- Herris, Jack (2020). Zeppelin-Staaken Aircraft of WWI: Volume 1: VGO.1 – R.VI R.29/16. Reno, Nevada: Aeronaut.
- Kroschel, Günter; Stützer, Helmut (1994). Die deutschen Militärflugzeuge 1910–1918 [German military aircraft 1910–1918] (in German). Augsburg: E. S. Mittler & Sohn.
- Szigeti, Martin (2007). "Geburtsstunde der Giganten" [Birth of the Giants]. Klassiker der Luftfahrt (in German). No. 4/07. Stuttgart: Motor Presse Stuttgart. pp. 10–17.
