= Zeppelin-Staaken VGO.II =

German heavy bomber aircraft of World War I

VGO.II
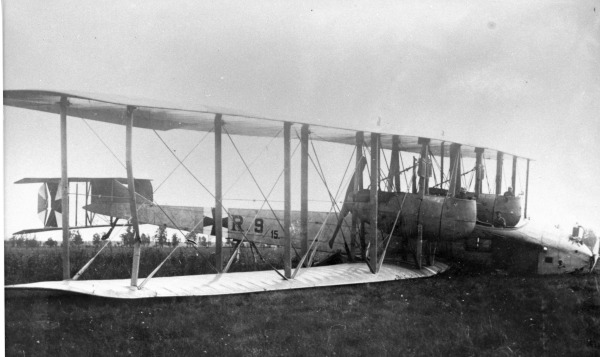

General information
- Type: Heavy bomber
- National origin: Germany
- Manufacturer: Zeppelin-Staaken
- Primary user: Imperial German Army Air Service
- Number built: 1

History
- First flight: 25 October 1915
- Developed from: Zeppelin-Staaken VGO.I
- Developed into: Zeppelin-Staaken VGO.III; Zeppelin-Staaken R.IV

The Zeppelin-Staaken VGO.II was a heavy bomber built in Germany in 1915 and which saw limited service during World War I. Although only one example was built, it served as a prototype for further Riesenflugzeuge ("giant aircraft") by Zeppelin-Staaken. Its "VGO" designation was assigned because the aircraft was constructed by Versuchsbau Gotha-Ost, a division of Gothaer Waggonfabrik. It was developed from the VGO.I that had been purchased by the Imperial German Navy, but the VGO.II was purchased by the Army instead.

== Design ==
The VGO.II was a four-bay, equal-span biplane with slightly negative wing stagger. Of mostly conventional configuration it diverged most noticeably from the designs of the day not only by its size, but by its biplane horizontal stabilisers, its two fins, and its tricycle undercarriage. Its two pilots sat in an open cockpit. One engine was mounted in the nose, driving a tractor propeller, and the other two were mounted in nacelles in the interplane gap and drove pusher propellers. These nacelles were large enough to accommodate a mechanic, who could make his way into them in flight (a requirement of the Riesenflugzeuge specification). The fuselage included a bomb bay large enough to carry a 1,000-kilogram (2,200 lb) bomb. As defensive armament, the VGO.II carried two machine guns in the fuselage, one firing upward and the other downward, plus a machine gun in the front of each engine nacelle.

== Development ==
The design and construction of the VGO.II was very similar to that of the VGO.I, but incorporated several refinements based on experience gained with test flights of the earlier machine. These modifications included a redesigned tail with a larger gap between the horizontal surfaces, and fewer fins, plus the addition of machine-gun positions in the fronts of the engine nacelles. These changes were later retrofitted to the VGO.I during its first rebuild.

Construction work began in December 1914, and the first flight took place on 25 October 1915. By then, the ongoing problems that the Navy had experienced with the VGO.I very nearly led the Army to cancel the VGO.II, but the aircraft was accepted into Army service on 28 November and given the Idflieg serial number R.9/15.

== Operational history ==
In February 1916, the VGO.II was assigned to Rfa 500 (Riesenflugzeugabteilung, "giant aeroplane unit") at Auce. From there, it undertook test flights before becoming the first R-plane to see combat. Although test pilot Offizierstellvertreter Vinzenz Selmer claimed to have made an attack on Russian targets as early as March, the earliest substantiated raid by the VGO.II was on 13 August against the railway junction at Sloka. Successfully missions continued into the autumn. On one of these, it was damaged in a forced landing that tore off its undercarriage and damaged a strut, but it was repaired and returned to service within a few days.

During its service life, the VGO.II was fitted with experimental armament. The first of these was a machine gun fitted to the tip of the tail. However, the flexibility of the fuselage structure meant that this position and the gunner assigned to it were subject to such oscillation as to render the crewmember hopelessly airsick to the point of incapacitation. A more promising trial was fitting a downward-firing 130-millimetre (5 1/8 in) cannon in the fuselage. Dubbed (Aussstossrohn, "launching tube"), it was hoped that this installation would be able to achieve greater accuracy than was possible with free-fall bombs, especially against relatively small targets like warships, whose armoured decks it would also be able to penetrate. Ground tests of the cannon installed on a tower began on 25 May, especially to investigate how much recoil it produced. When this proved acceptable, the fuselage of the VGO.II was reinforced, and the cannon installation was again tested on the ground on 6 and 10 October, this time mounted in the aircraft itself. Finally, on 19 October, it was tested in flight. The accuracy proved disappointing, missing the target by 40–45 metres (131–148 ft) from an altitude of 800 metres (2,600 ft), and the cannon was removed.

By the end of 1916, the VGO.II was obsolete, and on 1 January 1917, it was reassigned to Rea (Riesenflugzeugersatzabteilung, "giant aeroplane support unit") as a training machine at Döberitz. It was eventually damaged beyond repair in a hard landing. The exact date is unknown, but was probably in Summer 1917. No casualty records are associated with the incident.

== Operators ==
Imperial German Army Air Service
Rfa 500
Rea

== Specifications ==
Data from Kroschel & Stützer 1994, p.133, and as noted

General characteristics

- Crew: Six
- Length: 23.78 m (78 ft 0 in)
- Wingspan: 42.2 m (138 ft 5 in)
- Height: 7 m (23 ft 0 in)
- Wing area: 332 m^{2} (3,570 sq ft)
- Empty weight: 6,637 kg (14,632 lb)
- Gross weight: 10,203 kg (22,494 lb)
- Powerplant: 3 × Maybach HS six-cylinder, water-cooled, inline piston engine, 177 kW (237 hp) each (240 PS each)

Performance

- Maximum speed: 110 km/h (68 mph, 59 kn)
- Service ceiling: 3,000 m (9,800 ft)
- Time to altitude: 2,000 metres (6,600 ft) in 39 minutes
  3,000 metres (9,800 ft) in 79 minutes

Armament

- Guns: 4 × 7.92-millimetre (0.312 in) Parabellum MG 14 machine guns
- Bombs: 1,000 kilograms (2,200 lb) bombs

== Notes ==
=== Bibliography ===
- Cooksley, Peter (2000). German Bombers of WWI in Action. Carrollton, Texas: Squadron/Signal.
- Gray, Peter; Thetford, Owen (1992). German Aircraft of the First World War. London: Putnam.
- Haddow, George William; Grosz, Peter M. (1988). The German giants: the story of the R-Planes 1914–1919. London: Putnam.
- Herris, Jack (2020). Zeppelin-Staaken Aircraft of WWI: Volume 1: VGO.1 – R.VI R.29/16. Reno, Nevada: Aeronaut.
- Kroschel, Günter; Stützer, Helmut (1994). Die deutschen Militärflugzeuge 1910–1918 [German military aircraft 1910–1918] (in German). Augsburg: E. S. Mittler & Sohn.
- Szigeti, Martin (2007). "Geburtsstunde der Giganten" [Birth of the Giants]. Klassiker der Luftfahrt (in German). No. 4/07. Stuttgart: Motor Presse Stuttgart. pp. 10–17.
