= Zeppelin-Staaken R.VI =

Heavy bomber aircraft model

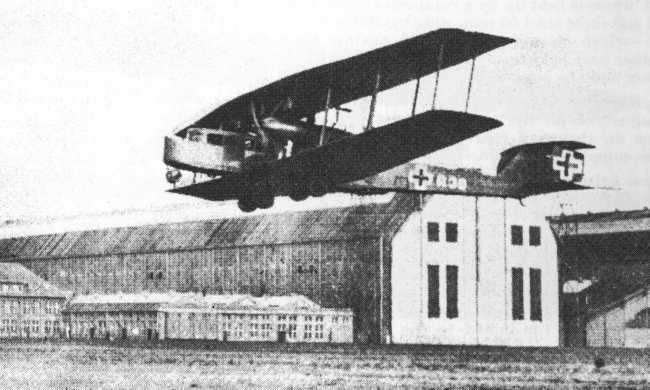

General information
- Type: Bomber
- Manufacturer: Zeppelin-Staaken
- Designer: Alexander Baumann
- Primary user: Luftstreitkräfte
- Number built: 56 (total of all R-series, 18 Type R.VI completed)

History
- Manufactured: 1917 to 1918
- Introduction date: 1917
- First flight: 1916
- Variants: Zeppelin-Staaken R.V; Zeppelin-Staaken R.VII; Zeppelin-Staaken R.XIV; Zeppelin-Staaken R.XV; Zeppelin-Staaken R.XVI

The Zeppelin-Staaken R.VI was a four-engined German biplane strategic bomber of World War I, and the only Riesenflugzeug (giant aircraft) design built in any quantity.

The R.VI was the most numerous of the R-Bombers built by Germany, and also among the earliest closed-cockpit military aircraft (the first being the Russian Sikorsky Ilya Muromets). The bomber was reputedly the largest wooden aircraft to be produced in any quantity during World War I, with only the Siemens-Schuckert R.VIII prototype bomber of 1916–1919 being larger, and with the Staaken R.VI's wingspan of 42.2 m (138 ft) nearly equaling that of the World War II Boeing B-29 Superfortress, although significantly less than the 48 m (157 ft) span of the Siemens-Schuckert R.VIII.

== Design and development ==
By the autumn of 1916, Staaken was completing its R.V, the R.VI prototype, and R.VII versions of the same design, and Idflieg selected the R.VI for series production over the 6-engined R.IV and other Riesenflugzeug designs, primarily those of Siemens-Schuckertwerke AG.

With four direct-drive engines in a tandem push-pull arrangement, and an enclosed cockpit, the R.VI design required none of the complex gearboxes of other R-types. Each R.VI bomber required the support of a 50-man ground crew. The R.VI required a complex 18-wheel undercarriage consisting of twin nose wheels and a quartet of four-wheeled groupings for its main gear to support the weight. It carried two mechanics in flight, seated between the engines in open niches cut in the center of each nacelle. The bombs were carried in an internal bomb bay located under the central fuel tanks, with three racks each capable of holding seven bombs. The R.VI was capable of carrying the 1,000 kg (2,200 lb) PuW bomb.

Although designed by Versuchsbau, because of the scope of the project, the production R.VI's were manufactured by other firms: seven by Schütte-Lanz using sheds at Flugzeugwerft GmbH Staaken, Berlin; six by Automobil und Aviatik A.G. (Aviatik) (the original order was for three); and three by Albatros Flugzeugwerke. 13 of the production models were commissioned into service before the armistice and saw action.

One R.VI was as a float-equipped seaplane for the Marine-Fliegerabteilung (Imperial German Naval Air Service), with the designation Type L and s/n 1432, using Maybach engines. After the first flight on 5 September 1917 the Type "L" crashed during testing on 3 June 1918. The Type 8301, of which four were ordered and three delivered, was developed from the R.VI by elevating the fuselage above the lower wing for greater water clearance, eliminating the bomb bays, and enclosing the open gun position on the nose.

=== The special "R.30/16" test aircraft ===
R.VI serial number R.30/16 was the earliest known supercharged aircraft to fly, with a fifth engine - a Mercedes D.II - installed in the central fuselage, driving a Brown-Boveri four-stage supercharger, about 6,000 rpm. This enabled the R.30/16 to climb to an altitude of 19,100 feet (5,800 m). The idea of supercharging an aircraft's propeller-driving piston engines with an extra engine used solely to power a supercharger was not attempted again by Germany until later in World War II, when both the Dornier Do 217P and Henschel Hs 130E experimental bomber designs each revived the idea as the Höhen-Zentrale-Anlage system. The R.30/16 aircraft was later fitted with four examples of one of the first forms of variable-pitch propellers, believed to have been ground-adjustable only.

== Operational service ==
The R.VI equipped two Luftstreitkräfte (Imperial German Army Air Service) units, Riesenflugzeug-Abteilung (Rfa) 500 and Rfa 501, with the first delivered June 28, 1917.

The units first served on the Eastern Front, based at Alt-Auz and Vilua in Kurland until August 1917. Almost all missions were flown at night with 770 kg (1,698 lb) bomb loads, operating between 6,500 and 7,800 feet (2,000 and 2,400 m) altitude. Missions were of three to five hours' duration.

Rfa 501 transferred to Ghent, Belgium, to attack France and Great Britain, arriving September 22, 1917, at Sint-Denijs-Westrem airdrome. Rfa 501 later moved its base to Scheldewindeke airdrome south of group headquarters at Gontrode, while Rfa 500 was based at Castinne, France, with its primary targets French airfields and ports.

Rfa 501, with an average of five R.VI's available for missions, conducted 11 raids on Britain between September 28, 1917, and May 20, 1918, dropping 27,190 kg (27 long tons; 30 short tons) of bombs in 30 sorties. Aircraft flew individually to their targets on moonlit nights, requesting directional bearings by radio after takeoff, then using the River Thames as a navigational landmark. Missions on the 340-mile (550 km) round trip lasted seven hours. None were lost in combat over Great Britain (compared to 28 Gotha G bombers shot down over England), but two crashed returning to base in the dark. Four R.VI's were shot down in combat (one-third of the operational inventory), with six others destroyed in crashes, of the 13 commissioned during the war. Six of the 18 built survived the war or were completed after the armistice.

== Discovered crash site ==
Very little remains of these giant bombers, although nearly a century after the end of World War I amateur historians of the "Poelcapelle 1917 Association vzw" working in Poelkapelle, northeast of Ypres, identified a wreck that was found in 1981 by Daniel Parrein, a local farmer who was plowing his land. For a while it was thought that the wreck was that of French ace Georges Guynemer's SPAD S.XIII; however that was discounted when repair tools were found at the site, and further research pointed that the engine was a Mercedes D.IVa, possibly of a Gotha G bomber. A comparison of recovered parts was inconclusive, since the parts were common to a number of aircraft other than the Gotha G.

In 2007 the researchers, Piet Steen with some help of Johan Vanbeselaere, finally made a conclusive identification after visiting one of the few partial specimens (the distinctive engine nacelles) in a Kraków air museum. With the help of the Polish aviation historians, parts were identified as those of Zeppelin-Staaken R.VI R.34/16, which crashed on 21 April 1918 after a mission against the Royal Air Force airfield at Saint-Omer, France. The R.VI was shot down, apparently by anti-aircraft fire of the Second Army, while trying to cross the front line, killing all seven crew members.

== Variants ==
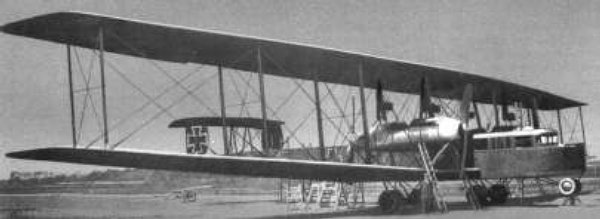
Zeppelin-Staaken R.VI

Zeppelin-Staaken R.VI

The first true production Zeppelin-Staaken Riesenflugzeug was the R.VI. This giant aircraft was powered either by four 245 hp (183 kW) Maybach MbIV engines or four 260 hp (190 kW) Mercedes D.IVa engines. The fuselage was similar to the previous aircraft but the cockpit was extended forwards, enclosed and glazed with a gunners cockpit in the extreme nose. Other improvements included aluminium alloy structure in the triple finned biplane tail unit, which was built with inverse camber to improve the stabilising downforce. Eighteen R.VIs were built serial numbers 'R25' to 'R39' and 'R52' to 'R54' all except 'R30', which was used exclusively as a supercharged engine test-bed, saw service in the Luftstreitkräfte with Rfa 500 and Rfa 501 on the western front stationed in the Ghent area. Air raids on England by R.VIs began on 17 September 1917. Many air raids attributed to Gotha bombers were, carried out by Zeppelin-Staaken R.VI or R.XIV bombers, with hits on the Royal Hospital Chelsea with the first 1,000 kg (2,200 lb) bomb dropped on England, on 16/17 February 1918. St Pancras Station was attacked the next night. During the campaign from 18 December 1917 to 20 May 1918 the R.VIs of Rfa501 made eleven raids dropping 27,190 kg (26.76 long tons) of bombs. Eighteen built.

Zeppelin-Staaken R.VII

Differing little from the R.IV, the R.VII had a revised arrangement of struts in the tail unit. The sole R.VII, serial number R 14/15, crashed during its delivery flight to the front line. One built.

Zeppelin-Staaken R.XIV

The R.XIV closely resembled previous Zeppelin-Staaken Riesenflugzeug differing only in engine installation and details. The five Maybach MbIV engines were arranged as push-pull pairs in the nacelles, with the engineer accommodated between the engines, and a tractor engine in the nose. Three R.XIVs were built, serial numbers R 43/16 to R 45/16, of which R 43/16 was shot down by Capt. Archibald Buchanan Yuille of 151 Squadron.

Zeppelin-Staaken R.XV

The R.XV also carried on the five engine layout of the R.XIV but introduced a large central fin in the tail unit. Three R.XVs were built, serial numbers R 46/16 to R 48/16 but there is no evidence that they carried out operational flights.

Zeppelin-Staaken L

This aircraft was essentially an R.VI fitted with large 13 m (42 ft 8 in) long duralumin floats. Allocated the serial no. 1432 by the Kaiserliche Marine the aircraft was wrecked during trials. One built.

Zeppelin-Staaken 8301

Zeppelin-Staaken used R.VI wings mated to a new fuselage, which incorporated the large central fin of the R.XV, suspended midway between the mainplanes, all supported by floats similar to the 'Type "L"'. Three were built, serial numbers 8301, 8303 and 8304, of which 8301 was also tested with a land undercarriage. The existence of 8302 has not been confirmed.

== Operators ==
- German Empire
  - Luftstreitkräfte – Imperial German Air Service
    - Riesenflugzeugabteilung 500 (Rfa 500)
    - Riesenflugzeugabteilung 501 (Rfa 501)
  - Marine-Fliegerabteilung – Imperial German Naval Air Service
- Ukrainian People's Republic
  - One (R-39/16) - Ukrainian Air force. Crashed on August 4, 1919.

== Specifications (Zeppelin-Staaken R.VI) ==
Data from The German Giants

General characteristics

- Crew: 10 (commander, two pilots, two copilots, two radio operators and fuel attendant in the cockpit, one mechanic in each engine nacelle)
- Length: 22.1 m (72 ft 6 in)
- Wingspan: 42.2 m (138 ft 5 in)
- Height: 6.3 m (20 ft 8 in)
- Wing area: 332 m^{2} (3,570 sq ft)
- Empty weight: 7,921 kg (17,463 lb)
- Gross weight: 11,848 kg (26,120 lb)
- Fuel capacity: 3,000 L (793 US gal)
- Powerplant: 4 × Mercedes D.IVa 6-cyl. water-cooled in-line piston engine (Note: R.VI 30/16 was fitted with a Brown-Boveri centrifugal supercharger in the fuselage, driven by a Mercedes D.II engine), 190 kW (260 hp) each
- Powerplant: 4 × Maybach Mb.IVa high compression (Note: The high compression Maybach Mb IVa was unable to run at full throttle below 2,000 ft (610 m)) 6-cyl. water-cooled in-line piston engine, 183 kW (245 hp) each
- Propellers: 2-bladed tractor propeller (Note: Tandem push–pull nacelles, with the rear engines driving 14.08 ft (4 m) pusher propellers), 4.26 m (14 ft 0 in) diameter

Performance

- Maximum speed: 135 km/h (84 mph, 73 kn)
- Range: 800 km (500 mi, 430 nmi)
- Endurance: 7-10 hours
- Service ceiling: 4,320 m (14,170 ft)
- Rate of climb: 1.67 m/s (329 ft/min)
- Time to altitude: :*10 min to 1,000 m (3,300 ft)

- 23 min to 2,000 m (6,600 ft)
- 43 min to 3,000 m (9,800 ft)
- 2 hr 26 min to 4,320 m (14,170 ft)

Armament

- Guns: Provision for 4 × 7.92 mm (0.312 in) Parabellum MG14 machine-guns in nose, dorsal, ventral and upper-wing positions firing the 8×57mm IS round.
- Bombs: up to 4,409 lb (2,000 kg) of bombs

== See also ==
- Riesenflugzeuge

Related development

- Zeppelin-Staaken Type 8301
- Zeppelin-Staaken R.IV
- Zeppelin-Staaken R.VII
- Zeppelin-Staaken R.XIV

Aircraft of comparable role, configuration, and era

- Barling XNBL-1 Bomber
- Caproni Ca.4
- Handley Page V/1500
- Sikorsky Ilya Muromets
- Sikorsky Russky Vityaz
- Tarrant Tabor
