= Zeppelin-Staaken R.XIV =

Heavy German Aircraft

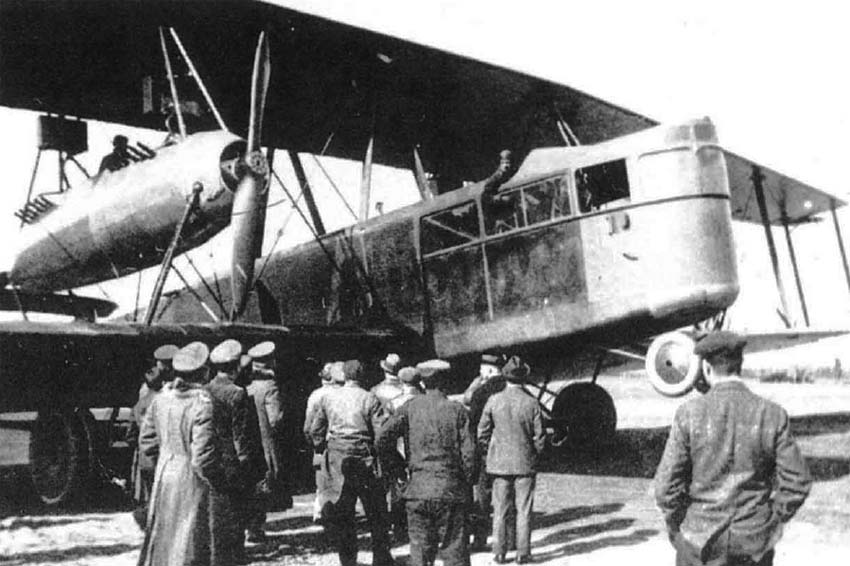
- First version with four Austro-Daimler engines.

General information
- Type: Bomber
- National origin: Germany
- Manufacturer: Schütte-Lanz
- Designer: Graf von Zeppelin
- Primary user: Luftstreitkräfte

History
- First flight: 1918
- Variants: Zeppelin-Staaken R.V, Zeppelin-Staaken R.VI, Zeppelin-Staaken R.VII, Zeppelin-Staaken R.XV, Zeppelin-Staaken R.XVI

The Zeppelin-Staaken R.XIV was a development of the Zeppelin-Staaken R.VI. This was one of a series of large bombers called Riesenflugzeuge, intended to be less vulnerable than the dirigibles in use at the time.

== Development ==
The original version of the Staaken R.XIV had two engine nacelles, each housing a pair of 350hp Austro-Daimler V-12 engines in a push-pull configuration. The nacelles were large enough for some inflight maintenance. The Austro-Daimler engines were installed without reduction gears and were the most powerful available at the time, but soon proved to be unreliable. On 12 April 1918, during its second flight of the acceptance program, a connecting rod broke in one of the rear engines. The Austro-Daimlers were replaced by four 300 hp Basse und Selve BuS.IVa engines and it was ready for further flight testing by 10 May 1918. The unproven Basse und Selves were also problematic and had a tendency to seize pistons, so they were in turn removed in favor of the less powerful but reliable 245 hp high-compression Maybach Mb.IVa. In an attempt to maintain the performance of the Zeppelin-Staaken R.VI, a fifth Maybach engine was installed in the nose.

Four of the improved model R.XIVa were ordered by Idflieg late in the war. The XIVa had some weight reduction improvements and geared engines to increase the rate of climb, service ceiling and bombload. These were built between 1918 and 1919. The R.XIVa machines were built by the Flugzeugwerft G.m.b.H. at Staaken west of Berlin.

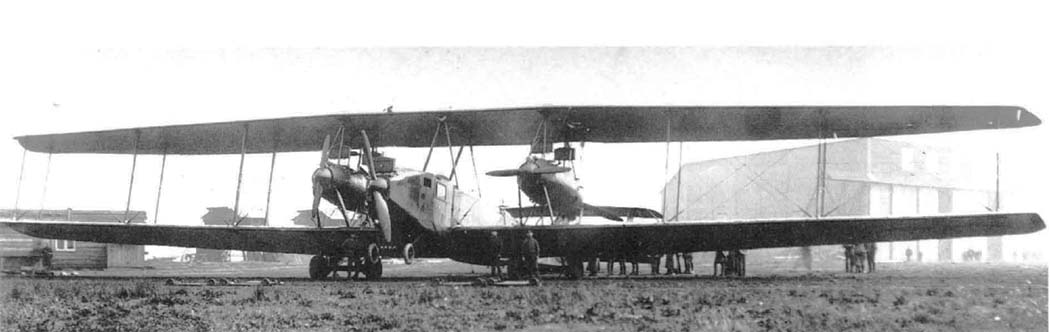
Zeppelin-Staaken R.XIV with five Maybach engines

== Operational history ==
Zeppelin-Staaken R.XIV 43/17 of Rfa 501 was brought down at 23:50 on August 10, 1918 by Capt A B Yuille of No 151 Sqn RAF, flying a Sopwith Camel D6573. It crashed one mile west of Lighthouse Talmas, near Doullens, and all crew members (Ltn Braun, Ofstv Buth, Ltn Corty, Vfw Donath, Flg Donnemaier, Flg Fonrobert, Uffz Kopp, Gefr Reuther and Flg Schneidersmann) were killed.

"A five engined Gotha (Actually a Staaken R.XIV) came over about midnight and dropped a few bombs. The searchlights got him and this time Jerry had a surprise as our flying scouts were up, spotted Fritz at once and went for him. In a few minutes a fight as on and we soon saw the big Gotha (Staaken R.XIV) in flames. He came down and a number of soldiers ran to the burning wreck, when one of the bombs exploded in the heat. Several of those who were near were killed and more injured. This machine carried eight men, three had been shot, four burned and one staff officer had jumped with a parachute, but this failed to open so he too was killed" - Diary of Thomas Spencer

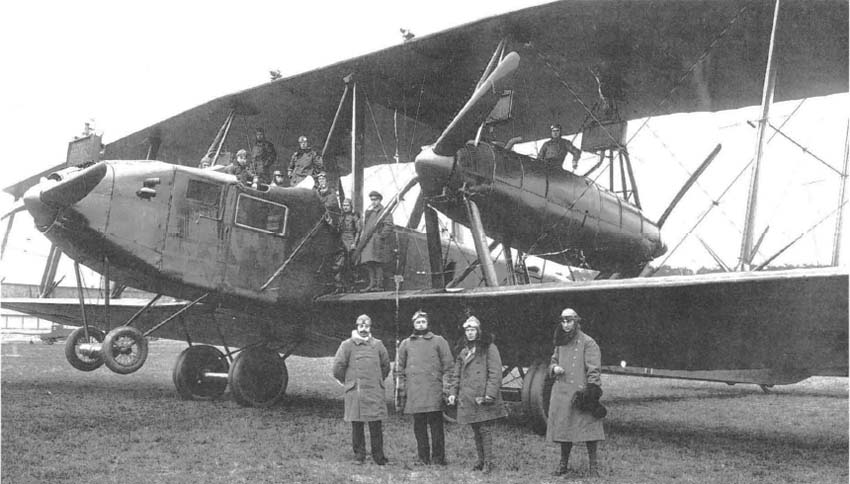
R.XIVa with flight mechanic visible at his position between engines

== Operators ==
German Empire

- Luftstreitkräfte

Ukrainian People's Republic

- Ukrainian People's Republic Air Fleet operated six planes (Zeppelin-Staaken R.XIVa)

Italy

- Zeppelin-Staaken R.XIVa R.69/18 which had been used by Ukraine, was confiscated by a commission of Entente representatives after landing at Aspern. It was later transferred to the Italian Air Force.

Romania

- Zeppelin-Staaken R.XIVa R.70/18 was seized by Romanian authorities on 19 September 1919, after an emergency landing near Cristinești. It was repaired and then flown to Bucharest on 27 October 1919, where it was used as a training airplane for bomber pilots.

== Specifications (Zeppelin-Staaken R.XIVa) ==
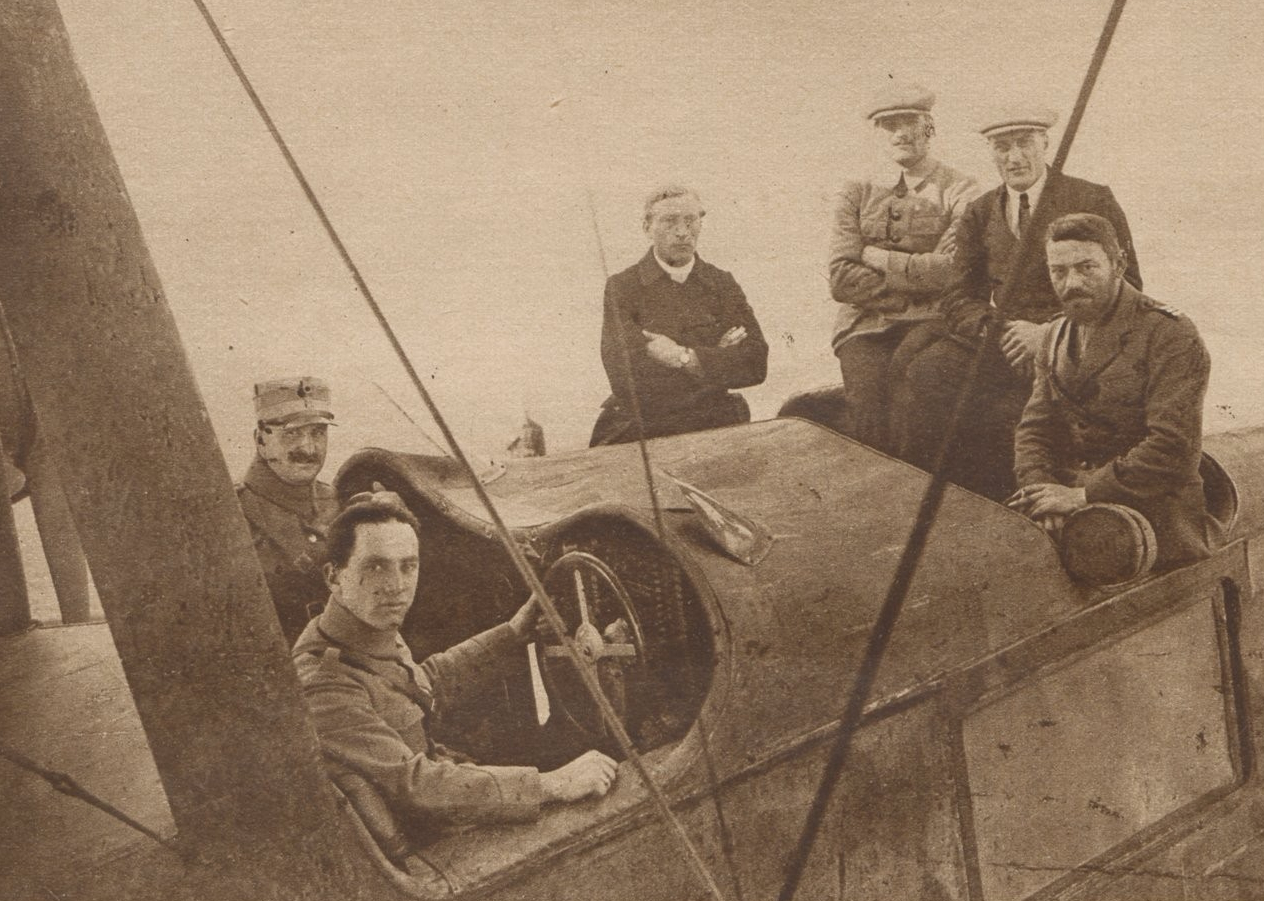
View of the cockpit of a Zeppelin-Staaken R.XIVa

Data from

General characteristics

- Crew: 7
- Length: 22.5 m (73 ft 10 in)
- Wingspan: 42.2 m (138 ft 5 in)
- Height: 6.3 m (20 ft 8 in)
- Wing area: 334 m^{2} (3,600 sq ft)
- Empty weight: 10,000 kg (22,046 lb)
- Gross weight: 14,250 kg (31,416 lb)
- Powerplant: 5 × Maybach Mb.IVa in-line 6 cylinder, 183 kW (245 hp) each

Performance

- Maximum speed: 135 km/h (84 mph, 73 kn)
- Cruise speed: 120 km/h (75 mph, 65 kn)
- Range: 1,300 km (810 mi, 700 nmi)
- Service ceiling: 4,500 m (14,800 ft)
- Rate of climb: 2.38 m/s (469 ft/min)

Armament

- Guns: 6 x lMG 08 7.92-mm machine guns
- Bombs: 2,000kg max
