= Zeppelin-Staaken L =

Type of aircraft

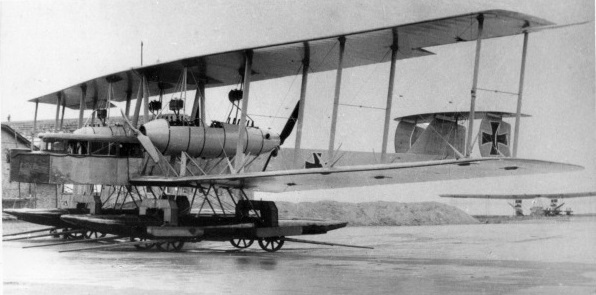
- The L on its beaching trolleys, Warnemünde, February 1918

General information
- Type: Long-range maritime patrol aircraft
- National origin: Germany
- Manufacturer: Zeppelin-Staaken
- Number built: 1 prototype

History
- First flight: 5 September 1917 (with floats)
- Developed from: Zeppelin-Staaken R.VI heavy bomber
- Developed into: Zeppelin-Staaken 8301

The Zeppelin-Staaken L was an experimental long-range maritime patrol floatplane developed during World War I by Zeppelin-Staaken for the Imperial German Navy's (Kaiserliche Marine) Naval Air Service (Marine-Fliegerabteilung). Derived from the Zeppelin-Staaken R.VI heavy bomber, it was a large, four-engine aircraft with a crew of seven men. Its engines were grouped in tractor-pusher pairs between the wings. A single aircraft was ordered for evaluation purposes in 1917. It was destroyed in a crash in June 1918 with the death of everyone aboard.

== Background and description ==
After two years of combat during World War I, the vulnerability of the Zeppelins on reconnaissance missions over the North Sea had been recognized by the Naval Air Service and Rear Admiral (Konteradmiral) Otto Philipp, commander of the Naval Air Service, outlined requirements during late 1916 for three types of multi-engine seaplanes to replace the Zeppelins. The highest priority was for a long-range four-engine maritime patrol aircraft with an endurance of 10–12 hours, capable of maintaining altitude on two engines, in a memorandum on 26 December. Philipp clarified that the reconnaissance aircraft's task would be mine spotting, anti-submarine duties, and shipping control on 10 February 1917. In response, Zeppelin-Staaken, a company formed in 1914 by Count Ferdinand von Zeppelin to build long-range heavy bombers, offered a floatplane version of their R.VI heavy bomber modified with additional fuel tanks. The Naval Air Service accepted their proposal and placed an order for a single aircraft on 15 February 1917.

The fuselage of the L was a lattice girder built from wood and steel tubing with the forward portion covered by plywood and the rest by fabric. The crew compartment housed both pilots, the bombardier/navigator, the Wireless operator and the fuel attendant. In the nose of the fuselage was the bombardardier's position and the bombsight; it could be fitted with a machine gun. Behind the crew compartment was the dorsal gunner's position armed with two flexible machine gun mounts and the ventral gunner's position with a single gun. The L was built with the R.VI's conventional landing gear with a twin-wheel auxiliary undercarriage beneath the nose for use during landing, but these were replaced once the aircraft had flown to the testing site in Potsdam with two large duralumin floats. Each float was subdivided into a dozen watertight compartments.

The L was a four-bay biplane with the fuselage attached to the lower wing. The wooden wings had two main spars and were built in three parts, a center portion and two end panels that were bolted to the center section. Balanced ailerons were only located on the upper wing. Unlike the R.VI they extended past the wingtips and the wings were slightly swept back at an angle of 1.5 degrees. The L was fitted with a biplane empennage with two horizontal stabilizers and two balanced rudders. Initially the upper horizontal stabilizer was only connected to the fuselage by struts, but a vertical stabilizer with an additional rudder was added during flight testing to improve directional stability. Elevators extended across the full width of both horizontal stabilizers.

The 260-horsepower (190 kW) Mercedes D.IVa straight-six engines were located between the wings on A-shaped struts positioned above the floats. Each pair of engines were arranged in a tractor-pusher configuration that was housed in an aluminium nacelle that rested on the crossbar of each strut with an engine at the front and the other at the rear. Additional struts ran from the lower wings to the nacelles to support the weight of the gearboxes. The radiators for each engine were attached to the strut above the nacelle. A flight mechanic's cockpit was positioned between the engines in the nacelle. Four-bladed propellers were initially fitted to the rear engines, but these were replaced by two-bladed ones during flight testing. The L was fitted with fourteen 245-litre (54 imp gal; 65 US gal) fuel tanks in the central fuselage. In addition each nacelle contained two 150-litre (33 imp gal; 40 US gal) fuel tanks. A 155-litre (34 imp gal; 41 US gal) gravity tank was positioned under the upper wing above each nacelle to provide fuel to the engines without using a pump. The additional fuel tanks increased the plane's endurance to ten hours over the seven hours of the R.VI bomber.

== History ==
The Zeppelin-Staaken L was completed in August 1917 and had its floats installed before 5 September when it made two short flights from the Spree River. Taxiing trials revealed a need to reinforce the floats with additional struts. The aircraft attempted to fly to the Naval Air Service base at Warnemünde on 12 November, but one engine failed and it had to make an emergency landing at Saaler Bodden, 40 km (25 mi) from the base. Repairs took a couple of days and the L was turned over to the Seaplane Experimental Command (Seeflugzeug-Versuchs-Kommando) on 17 November for testing. The aircraft was too large to fit in any of the existing hangars and a special hangar had to be built for it.

Flight testing showed that once enough fuel had been consumed to allow the L to fly on three engines, its range could be extended by turning one engine off. The only other result known from the testing is that it was not as stable on the water as the Zeppelin-Lindau flying boats like the RS.III designed by Claude Dornier. The Naval Air Service ordered six improved versions as the Zeppelin-Staaken 8301 in two batches in December 1917 and January 1918. The first pair ordered were still being evaluated by the Experimental Command when the war ended; two of the next batch had been completed, but not delivered. The L crashed at Warnemünde on 3 June 1918, killing all aboard, possibly due to engine failure.

== Specifications ==
Data from The German Giants: The German R-Planes 1914 – 1918

General characteristics

- Crew: 7
- Length: 22.2 m (72 ft 10 in)
- Wingspan: 42.2 m (138 ft 5 in)
- Height: 7.38 m (24 ft 3 in)
- Wing area: 360 m^{2} (3,900 sq ft)
- Empty weight: 8,400 kg (18,519 lb)
- Gross weight: 11,800 kg (26,015 lb)
- Fuel capacity: 3,395 L (747 imp gal; 897 US gal)
- Powerplant: 4 × Mercedes D.IVa water-cooled straight-six engines, 190 kW (260 hp) each
- Propellers: 2-bladed, 4.4 m (14 ft 5 in) diameter

Performance

- Maximum speed: 125 km/h (78 mph, 67 kn)
- Endurance: 10 hours
- Service ceiling: 2,500 m (8,200 ft)
- Time to altitude: 23.7 minutes to 1,000 m (3,300 ft)

Armament

- Guns: Provision for nose, dorsal and ventral machine guns

== Bibliography ==
- Gray, Peter & Thetford, Owen (1987) [1970]. German Aircraft of the First World War (2nd ed.). London: Putnam. ISBN 0-85177-809-7.
- Haddow, George William & Grosz, Peter Michael (1988) [1962]. The German Giants: The German R-Planes 1914 – 1918 (3rd ed.). London: Putnam. ISBN 0-85177-812-7.
- Herris, Jack (2020). Zepplin-Staaken Aircraft of WWI: Volume 2: R.VI R.30/16 – E.4/20: A Centennial Perspective on Great War Airplanes. Great War Aviation Centennial Series. Vol. 48. n.p.: Aeronaut Books. ISBN 978-1-935881-76-6.
- Nowarra, Heinz J.; Robertson, Bruce & Cooksley, Peter G. (1966). Marine Aircraft of the 1914–1918 War. Letchworth, UK: Harleyford Publications. OCLC 123198808.
