= Alexander Baumann (aeronautical engineer) =

Alexander Baumann (15 May 1875 – 23 March 1928) was a German aeronautical engineer and aircraft designer. He is credited with being the first full professor of aeronautical engineering in aviation history as the Chair of Airship Aviation, Flight Technology, and Motor Vehicles at the Royal Institute of Technology, Stuttgart in 1911.

== Biography ==
=== Education and training ===
Alexander Baumann was born in Heilbronn, Germany. He studied mechanical engineering at the Technische Hochschule (TH) Stuttgart, graduating in 189as a "state construction supervisor" (Regierungsbauführer). His first job was an engineer for a machine company Sächsische Maschinenfabrik) in Chemnitz, followed by a stint with Dresdener Maschinenfabrik & Schiffswerft AG (formerly Maschinenbauanstalt Übigau) in Dresden .

=== Teaching career ===
In 1902 Baumann moved to Zwickau to teach engineering. He became an instructor at the Physical-Technical Reichs Establishment in Charlottenburg in 1908. In the five years following the powered flight by the Wright Brothers in 1903, Baumann received patents for several flying machine designs, flight control mechanisms, and slotted wings.

In 1910 Baumann began lecturing on aeronautics at TH Stuttgart, and his reputation brought him to the attention of Graf Ferdinand von Zeppelin. Zeppelin headed a foundation that raised 59,000 gold marks to establish a chair in aeronautical engineering at TH Stuttgart, and Baumann became the first holder of this chair later that year.

From his position, Baumann acquired a Wright Flyer from the Wright Brothers in 1912, and was a founding member of the Scientific Aeronautical Society of Stuttgart, a forerunner of the DGLR (German Society for Air and Space Flight). With the German manufacturer Gmbh Freytag, Baumann developed, constructed and tested a biplane of his own design.

In 1913 he had published a two-volume textbook, Mechanische Grundlagen des Flugzeugbaues ("Mechanical Basis of Aeronautical Engineering"), that became a standard reference for the next decade.

=== World War I ===
At the start of World War I, Ferdinand von Zeppelin brought Baumann into the Versuchsbau Gotha-Ost (VGO) consortium to design, develop, manufacture and test Riesenflugzeug ("giant aircraft"), a type to be larger than the Gotha G bombers. The first Riesenflugzeug built was the VGO.I in April 1915. Baumann, an expert in light-weight construction techniques, placed the four engines in nacelles mounted between the upper and lower wing decks to distribute the loads to save weight in the wing spars.

The follow-on VGO.III prototype, a 3-engine open cockpit bomber, produced greater power and validated the soundness of the basic design. Baumann designed and developed three successors, including the Zeppelin-Staaken R.VI, which became the largest bomber produced in quantity by the Germans in World War I.

For his achievements, Baumann was awarded the Royal-Württemberg Wilhelm Cross without Swords (Königlich-Württembergisches Wilhelmkreuz ohne Schwerter) in 1917.

=== Post-war design career ===
In 1924 Baumann became a design consultant for the Mitsubishi Jukogyo Kabushiki Kaisha in Nagoya, Japan, working with Nobushiro Nakata (chief designer) and Satsuo Tokunaga. Baumann designed three early Japanese military aircraft, the 2MR1 Tobi carrier reconnaissance plane, the experimental 2MB2 Washi (Eagle) light bomber and the 1MF2 Hayabusa ("Peregrine Falcon") fighter.

Baumann returned to Germany and died in Stuttgart on March 23, 1928, of lung cancer.
