= DFW R.I =

R.I

General information
- Type: Bomber
- Manufacturer: DFW
- Primary user: Luftstreitkräfte
- Number built: 1

History
- First flight: 5 September 1916

The DFW R.I (company designation T26) was a heavy bomber (Riesenflugzeug) aircraft designed by the Deutsche Flugzeug-Werke (DFW) during the First World War for the Imperial German Army's (Deutsches Heer) Imperial German Air Service (Luftstreitkräfte). One bomber was built and it only flew two combat missions as it was destroyed after making an emergency landing in 1917.

== Development ==
Designed by Hermann Dorner, chief engineer of DFW, it was a large biplane of conventional configuration with four 220-horsepower (160 kW) water-cooled Mercedes D.IV straight-eight piston engines mounted inside the fuselage. Each engine was provided with a gearbox and clutch, that drove the two-bladed wooden propellers on the wings via driveshafts; two of these were mounted tractor-fashion on the leading edge of the upper wing, and two mounted pusher-fashion on the trailing edge of the lower wing. The DFW heavy bombers were unique among the Riesenflugzeuge, in that each engine drove a separate propeller and was not connected to the other engines or propellers.

After factory tests proved promising, military acceptance trials commenced on 19 October 1916. Soon thereafter trouble set in, with the long crankshafts of the D.IV engines repeatedly failing. The cause was determined to be excessive vibrations from the lightly built engine mounts, but new engine mountings were installed and universal joints for the drive shafts were fitted to mitigate the problem, along with extended wings and other improvements.

== Operational history ==
Following these modifications, R.I (R 11/15) was deployed on the Eastern front with Rfa 500 at Alt-Auz, April to September 1917, from whence it bombed Schlok (now Sloka, Latvia), on 13 June. On its second combat mission in September, the R.I was forced to turn back before delivering its bombs due to the failure of two engines; after making a successful emergency landing it was destroyed when it ran into a trench and caught fire, killing one crewman.

== Specifications (DFW R.I (second version)) ==
Data from The German Giants: The German R-Planes 1914–1918; DFW Aircraft of WWI: A Centennial Perspective on Great War Airplanes

General characteristics

- Crew: at least 5
- Length: 17.6 m (57 ft 9 in)
- Wingspan: 30.5 m (100 ft 1 in)
- Height: 6 m (19 ft 8 in)
- Wing area: 186 m^{2} (2,000 sq ft)
- Empty weight: 6,800 kg (14,991 lb)
- Gross weight: 9,400 kg (20,723 lb)
- Powerplant: 4 × Mercedes D.IV water-cooled straight-eight piston engines, 160 kW (220 hp) each
- Propellers: 4 × 2-bladed

Performance

- Maximum speed: 120 km/h (75 mph, 65 kn)
- Wing loading: 51.7 kg/m^{2} (10.6 lb/sq ft)

Armament

- Guns: Provision for dorsal, ventral and nose machine-gun positions
- Bombs: 680 kg (1,500 lb)

== See also ==
Related development

- DFW R.II

Aircraft of comparable role, configuration, and era

- AEG R.I
- Linke-Hofmann R.I

== Bibliography ==
- Gray, Peter & Thetford, Owen (1987) [1970]. German Aircraft of the First World War (2nd ed.). London: Putnam. ISBN 0-85177-809-7.
- Haddow, G.W. & Grosz, Peter M. (1988). The German Giants: The German R-Planes 1914-1918 (3rd ed.). London: Putnam. ISBN 0-85177-812-7.
- Herris, Jack (2017). DFW Aircraft of WWI: A Centennial Perspective on Great War Airplanes. Great War Aviation Centennial Series. Vol. 29. n.p.: Aeronaut Books. ISBN 978-1-935881-54-4.
