= Linke-Hofmann R.I =

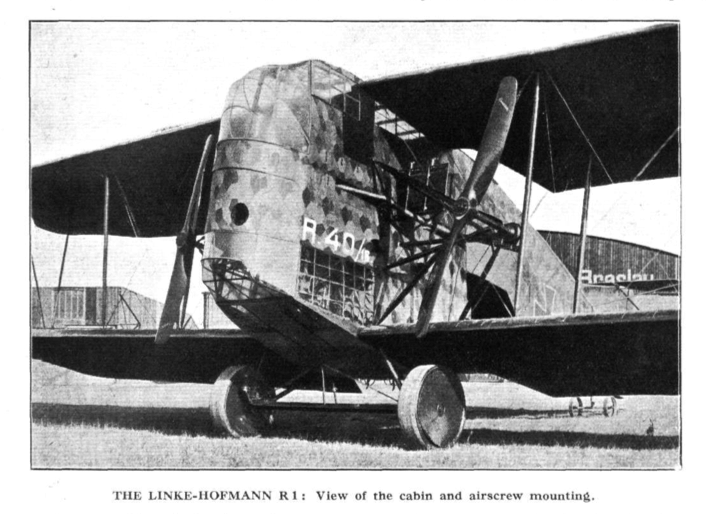
- The second Linke-Hofmann R.I, 40/16

General information
- Type: Heavy bomber
- National origin: German Empire
- Manufacturer: Linke-Hofmann
- Designer: Paul Stumpf
- Number built: 4

History
- First flight: spring 1917

The Linke-Hofmann R.I was a heavy bomber aircraft designed and built by the German company Linke-Hofmann during World War I. Only four were built and the type never saw service with the Luftstreitkräfte (Imperial German Air Service).

== Development ==
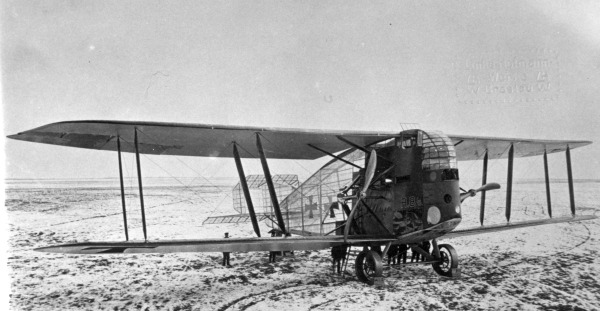
Linke-Hofmann R.I with cellon covered rear fuselage

Linke-Hofmann was one of a number of German manufacturers who competed to build Riesenflugzeug (giant aircraft) for the German air service during World War 1, despite the fact that Linke-Hofmann was principally a manufacturer of railway rolling stock, with little aeronautical experience.

Linke-Hofmann designed the fuselage of the R.I to completely fill the interplane gap of the widely separated biplane wings. Encouraging data from tests at the MLStG Laboratory at Göttingen suggested there would be advantages in this configuration.

The capacious fuselage housed the crew compartments as well as the four engines and their clutches and combining gearboxes. This configuration offered the advantage that the engines could be accessed in-flight for adjustment or minor repairs. However, there were serious problems during development with engine cooling and vibration.

Construction of the R.I was largely of wood covered by transparent Cellon (Cellulose acetate) (Note: Cellon was the trade name for cellulose acetate manufactured by Deutsche Celluloid Fabrik, Eilenburg, Germany. See) in the first prototype, R.I number 8/15, and lozenge camouflage fabric in the second aircraft, 40/16.

Cellon was used with the intention of making the aircraft partially transparent and so less visible; however, the Cellon reflected sunlight, making the aircraft more visible, before quickly yellowing due to the effect of ultra violet radiation. It also shrank and stretched due to in-flight temperature changes, with detrimental effect on trim.

The forward section of the fuselage was divided into three levels. The top deck housed the pilots and wireless station, the middle the engine compartment and the lower the bombardiers, fuel tanks and payload. This configuration would have made the aircraft top heavy when, after expending its fuel and weapon payload, it eventually landed.

The Linke-Hofmann R.I was powered by four in-board Mercedes D.IVa engines, rated at 260 hp (194 kW), coupled to a gear-box assembly which transferred power through shafts to two tractor propellers mounted between the wings, giving the aircraft a maximum speed of 140 km/h (87 mph).

== History ==
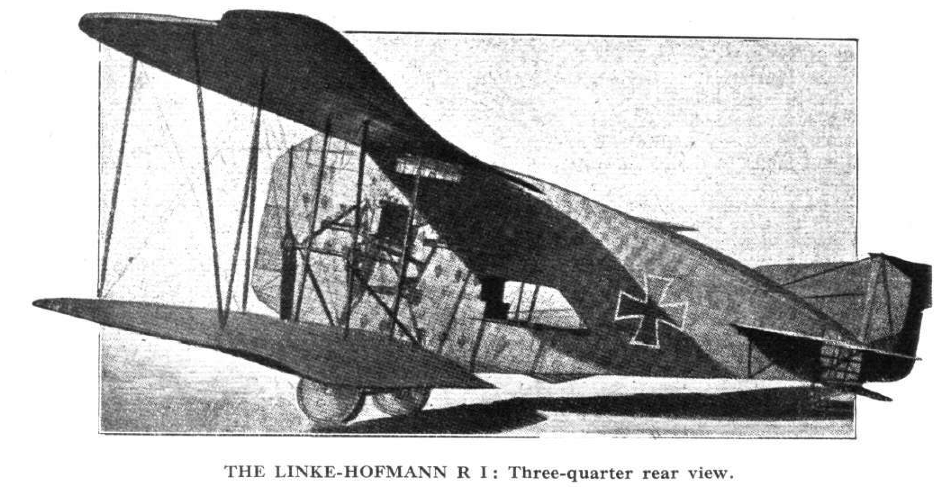
Side view of Linke-Hofmann R.I, 40/16

Flight testing of 8/15 began in the spring of 1917 but was not satisfactory. The aircraft was difficult to land because of the pilot's difficulty to judge altitude due to the high position of the flight cabin. In addition, the flight controls were mushy due to the warping and flexing of the lightly built wings. One pilot, recalling flying it, called it "not an aircraft but a sickness".

Although aileron control was sluggish, both rudder and elevator control were considered satisfactory and the unconventional design of the fuselage appeared not to have a detrimental effect on the aircraft's flying characteristics. The anticipated aerodynamic benefits of the tall fuselage filling the gap between the wings were not found on the full-size aircraft.

R.I 8/15 wings collapsed when the aircraft was at a low altitude, all but one of the crew surviving. R.I 40/16 was badly damaged when nosed over on landing, and was not repaired. The remaining two aircraft ordered, 41/16 and 42/16 were both completed but no details of their flying history are known.

== Specifications (Linke-Hofmann R.I) ==
Data from

General characteristics

- Crew: 6+
- Length: 15.6 m (51 ft 2.5 in)
- Wingspan: 33.2 m (108 ft 11.25 in)
- Height: 6.7 m (21 ft 11.75 in)
- Wing area: 265 m^{2} (2,851 sq ft)
- Empty weight: 8,000 kg (17,640 lb)
- Gross weight: 11,200 kg (24,696 lb)
- Powerplant: 4 × Mercedes D.IVa , 193.9 kW (260 hp) each

Performance

- Maximum speed: 130 km/h (81.25 mph, 70.60 kn)
- Endurance: 5 hours
- Rate of climb: 0.42 m/s (82 ft/min)

== See also ==
Aircraft of comparable role, configuration, and era

- Handley Page V/1500
- Siemens-Schuckert R.VIII
- Zeppelin-Staaken R.VI
- Zeppelin-Staaken R.XVI

Related lists

- List of bomber aircraft
