= Mannesmann Giant Triplane =

General information
- Type: Long-range transport
- Manufacturer: Fahrzeugbau Bruning
- Designer: Villehad Forssman
- Primary user: Luftstreitkräfte (intended)
- Number built: 0 (one airframe partially completed by the time of Armistice)

History
- First flight: not flown

The Mannesmann Giant Triplane (also called Poll Triplane) was a giant German triplane designed and constructed during the final months of World War I. The Mannesmann Triplane was at an advanced stage of completion when the Armistice was signed.

== Design ==
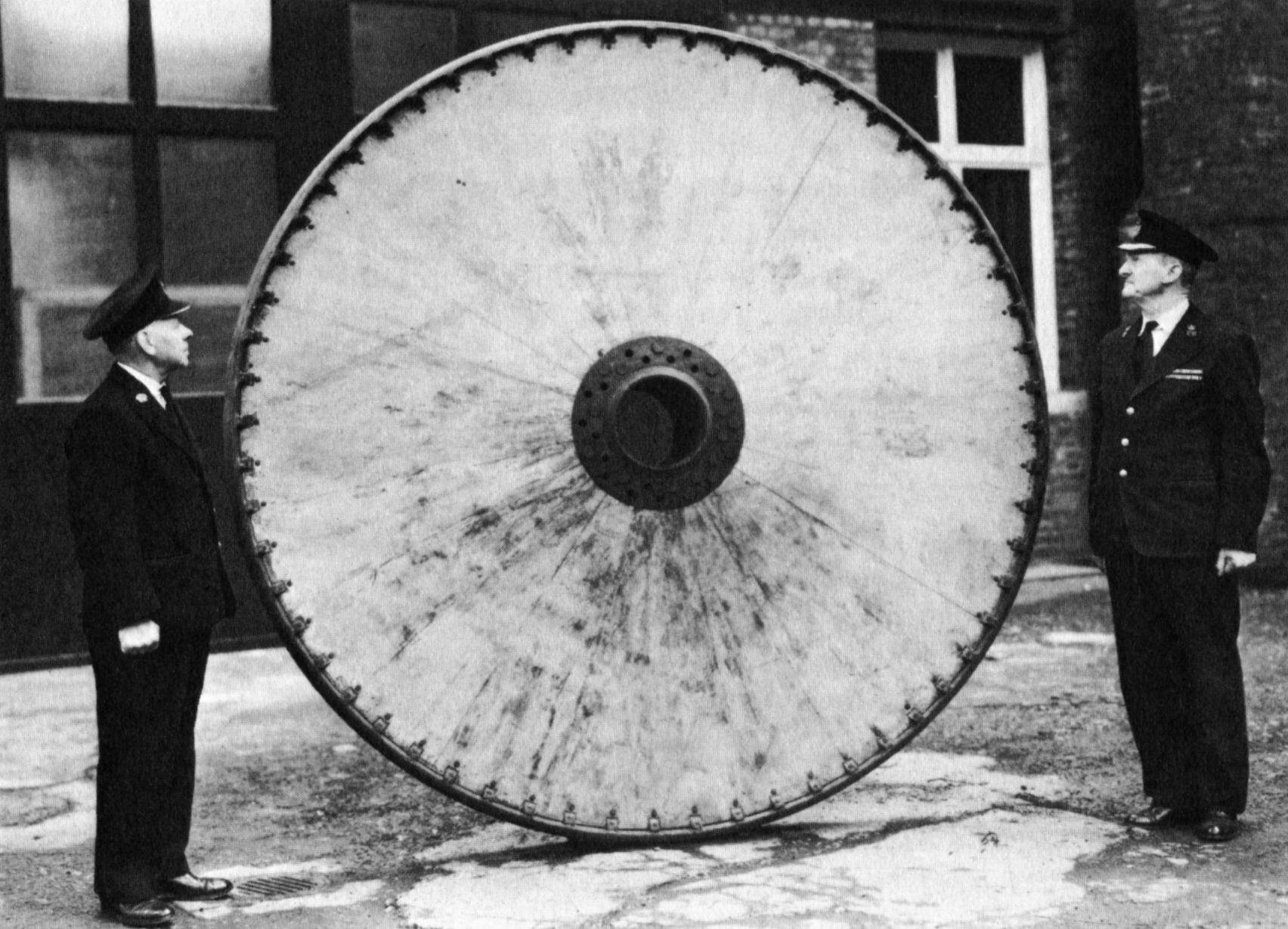
Allied inspection posing with one of the wheels of the incomplete Mannesmann triplane, 1919

The Mannesmann Triplane was to be a giant triplane with the middle wing spanning 165 ft (50 m) and the upper and lower wings spanning 102 ft (31 m). The fuselage, measuring 150 ft (46 m) long, was rectangular in cross-section and was of plywood construction. The wheels would have measured 7 ft 9 in (2.36 m) in diameter. Power was to be supplied by ten engines mounted in tandem in five nacelles, one above the lower wing below the fuselage and four at strut intersections on the middle wing. Only the middle wing would be fitted with ailerons.

== Development ==
The Mannesmann Triplane was conceived in 1917 as a long-range transport by Villehad Forssman, who had designed the Siemens-Schuckert Forssman R-plane. Although the Inter-Allied Aeronautical Control Commission (IAACC) believed it to be a long-range bomber able to reach New York, archival records of the Imperial German Navy show that Mannesmann designed the triplane as a transport plane, not a bomber. A 1920 issue of the Illustrated London News asserted that Mannesmann's triplane project was intended to drop propaganda leaflets over New York. The fuselage frame had been built at the Poll, Cologne airfield, and the engines, ailerons, tail, and undercarriage were yet to be shipped to the Poll airfield when construction of the aircraft was halted due to the Armistice. The airframe for the Mannesmann triplane was inspected by the IAACC team in 1919, and a section of the fuselage and one of the huge wheels of the triplane are in storage at the Imperial War Museum in Duxford, UK.

== See also ==
- Riesenflugzeug
- List of large aircraft
