= DFW R.III =

R.III
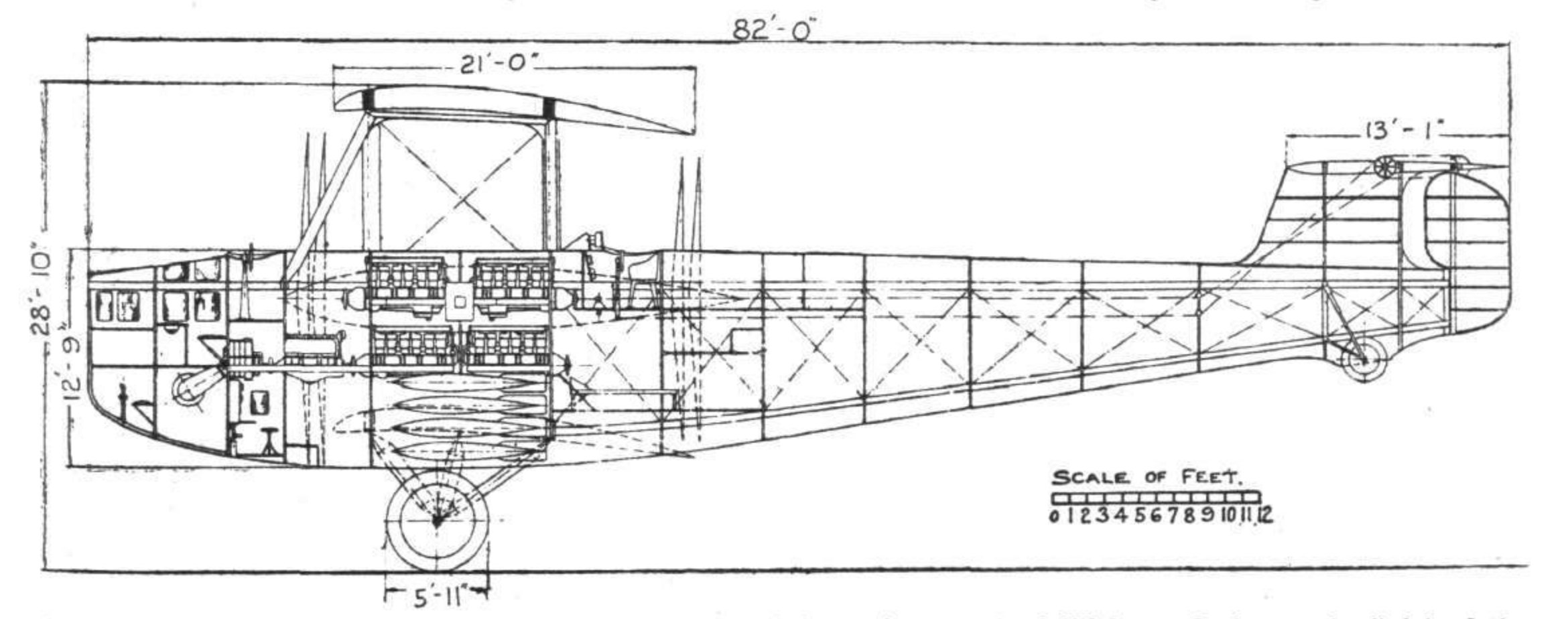

General information
- Type: Bomber
- Manufacturer: DFW
- Status: Cancelled project
- Primary user: Luftstreitkräfte

The DFW R.III was a heavy bomber (Riesenflugzeug) biplane aircraft to be built by the Deutsche Flugzeug-Werke (DFW) during the First World War for the Imperial German Army's (Deutsches Heer) Imperial German Air Service (Luftstreitkräfte). Design work had begun two months before the end of the war in November 1918, but was terminated at that time before construction began.

== Development ==
The Inspectorate of Flying Troops (Inspektion der Fliegertruppen ordered two improved versions of the company's preceding R.II bomber on 3 September 1918. That aircraft's flying performance was mediocre and more power was thought to be the answer. More powerful engines were not available so the number of engines was doubled to eight 260-horsepower (190 kW) Mercedes D.IVas in the fuselage. Each was to be connected to a coaxial contra-rotating propeller in a push-pull configuration via a driveshaft. The propeller gearboxes were to be housed in a nacelle between the wings that also contained the fuel tanks. Another concept examined was use pairs of engines geared together to a single propeller, also in a push-pull arrangement. One or two auxiliary 120 hp (89 kW) Mercedes D.II engines would drive superchargers that could maintain the R.III's performance up to an altitude of 5,000 m (16,000 ft).

The pilots' cockpit was located under the trailing edge of the upper wing and the navigator had his own compartment forward of the wings. The aircraft was intended to be armed with eight machine guns in twin-gun mounts, fired by gunners located in upper nose, lower nose, ventral and dorsal positions of the double-decker fuselage. The R.III was required to be able to lift 2,500 kg (5,500 lb) of bombs.

== Specifications (as designed) ==
Data from The German Giants: German R-planes 1914–1918

General characteristics

- Crew: 7
- Length: 25 m (82 ft 0 in)
- Wingspan: 53.5 m (175 ft 6 in)
- Height: 8.6 m (28 ft 3 in)
- Powerplant: 8 × Mercedes D.IVa water-cooled straight-six piston engines, 190 kW (260 hp) each
- Powerplant: 1 or 2 × Mercedes D.II water-cooled straight-six piston engines, 89 kW (120 hp) each auxiliary engines to run superchargers

Armament

- Guns: 8 × machine guns
- Bombs: 2,500 kg (5,500 lb)

== Bibliography ==
- Haddow, G.W. & Grosz, Peter M. (1988). The German Giants: The German R-Planes 1914-1918 (3rd ed.). London: Putnam. ISBN 0-85177-812-7.
- Herris, Jack (2017). DFW Aircraft of WWI: A Centennial Perspective on Great War Airplanes. Great War Aviation Centennial Series. Vol. 29. n.p.: Aeronaut Books. ISBN 978-1-935881-54-4.
