= Zeppelin-Staaken R.IV =

German heavy bomber aircraft of World War I

R.IV
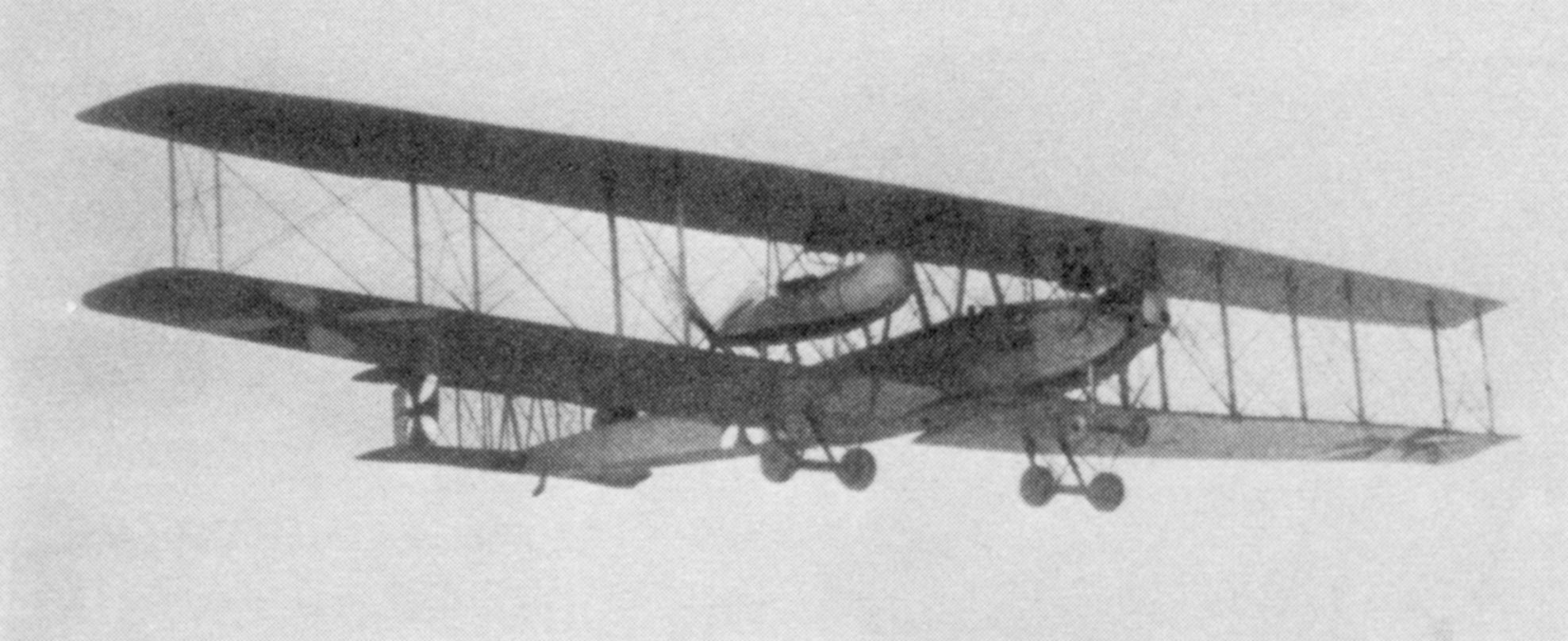

General information
- Type: Heavy bomber
- National origin: Germany
- Manufacturer: Zeppelin-Staaken
- Primary user: Imperial German Army Air Service
- Number built: 1

History
- First flight: 16 August 1916
- Developed from: Zeppelin-Staaken VGO.I; Zeppelin-Staaken VGO.II; Zeppelin-Staaken VGO.III

The Zeppelin-Staaken R.IV was a heavy bomber built in Germany in 1916 and which saw service during World War I, briefly on the Eastern Front and then more extensively on the Western Front until the end of the war. Built to the Imperial German Army's Riesenflugzeuge ("giant aircraft") specification, it was the first such design by Zeppelin-Staaken to receive the "R" designation.

== Design ==
The R.IV was based on its VGO.I, VGO.II, and VGO.III predecessors. It shared their wing design, albeit with the dihedral on the lower wing reduced from 3° to 1.5°. Its biplane tail unit was similar to that of the VGO.II and VGO.III, but was raised so that the lower of the two horizontal stabilisers was mounted on top of the fuselage instead of beneath it.

Overall, it was a four-bay, equal-span biplane with slightly negative wing stagger. Of mostly conventional configuration it diverged most noticeably from the designs of the day not only by its size, but by its biplane horizontal stabilisers, its two fins, and its tricycle undercarriage. Its two pilots sat in an open cockpit.

It adopted the innovative coupled-engine design of the VGO.III, which featured pairs of engines combined by gearboxes and clutches. One pair, in the nose, drove a tractor propeller, and two pairs in nacelles in the interplane gaps drove pusher propellers. The power of each pair was combined by a gearbox and clutch to turn a single propeller, meaning that if one of the pair failed, it could be disengaged so that the surviving engine could continue to provide power.

The fuselage included a bomb bay large enough to carry a 1,000-kilogram (2,200 lb) bomb. As defensive armament, the R.IV carried two machine guns in the fuselage, one firing upward and the other downward, plus a machine gun in the front of each engine nacelle. It also featured gunners' platforms on the top wing, above the engine nacelles. These were accessible in flight via a ladder and offered a 360° field of fire around the aircraft.

== Development ==
Like its predecessors, construction of the R.IV began at Versuchsbau Gotha-Ost (VGO), a division of Gothaer Waggonfabrik, in February 1916. However, during that year, production of airships by the Zeppelin company was relocated from Friedrichshafen to Staaken to distance the construction facilities from the increasing reach of strategic bombing by the Allies. Its first flight was made on 16 August 1916. VGO personnel had begun to transfer to Staaken on 15 June, and by the time the R.IV had completed its test flights, the migration was complete. The aircraft was given the Idflieg serial R.12/15.

== Operational history ==
The R.IV was accepted by the Imperial German Army Air Service on 5 May 1917, and on 12 June was assigned to Rfa 500 (Riesenflugzeugabteilung, "giant aeroplane unit") at Auce. There, it participated in raids on Valmiera (28/29 June) and Saaremaa (8/9 July).

In late July, the aircraft was redeployed to Rfa 501 near Ghent. From there, until the end of the war, the R.IV dropped 25,000 kilograms (55,000 lb) of bombs on London, Chelmsford, Thames Estuary, Calais, Morville, Boulogne, Étaples, Le Havre, Gravelines, Deauville, and Doullens. During a raid on London on the night of 16/17 February 1918, the R.IV survived a collision with a balloon apron stretched between the Woolwich Works and the West India Docks with only very minor damage.

The R.IV survived the war and was publicly displayed in Kassel and other German cities in 1919.

== Operators ==
Imperial German Army Air Service
Rfa 500
Rfa 501

== Specifications ==
Data from Kroschel & Stützer 1994, p.151, and as noted

General characteristics

- Crew: Eight
- Length: 23 m (75 ft 6 in)
- Wingspan: 42.2 m (138 ft 5 in)
- Height: 6.8 m (22 ft 4 in)
- Wing area: 332 m^{2} (3,570 sq ft)
- Empty weight: 9,450 kg (20,834 lb)
- Gross weight: 13,010 kg (28,682 lb)
- Powerplant: 2 × Mercedes D.III six-cylinder, water-cooled, inline piston engines, mounted in a pair in the nose, 118 kW (158 hp) each (160 PS each)
- Powerplant: 4 × Benz Bz.IV six-cylinder, water-cooled, inline piston engines, mounted in pairs, two to each engine nacelle, 162 kW (217 hp) each (220 PS each)

Performance

- Maximum speed: 125 km/h (78 mph, 67 kn)
- Range: 770 km (480 mi, 420 nmi)
- Service ceiling: 3,700 m (12,100 ft)
- Time to altitude: 1,000 metres (3,300 ft) in 10 minutes
  2,000 metres (6,600 ft) in 35 minutes
  3,000 metres (9,800 ft) in 89 minutes

Armament

- Guns: 7 × 7.92-millimetre (0.312 in) Parabellum MG 14 machine guns
- Bombs: 1,000 kilograms (2,200 lb) bombs

== Notes ==
=== Bibliography ===
- Cooksley, Peter (2000). German Bombers of WWI in Action. Carrollton, Texas: Squadron/Signal.
- Gray, Peter; Thetford, Owen (1992). German Aircraft of the First World War. London: Putnam.
- Haddow, George William; Grosz, Peter M. (1988). The German giants: the story of the R-Planes 1914–1919. London: Putnam.
- Herris, Jack (2020). Zeppelin-Staaken Aircraft of WWI: Volume 1: VGO.1 – R.VI R.29/16. Reno, Nevada: Aeronaut.
- Kroschel, Günter; Stützer, Helmut (1994). Die deutschen Militärflugzeuge 1910–1918 [German military aircraft 1910–1918] (in German). Augsburg: E. S. Mittler & Sohn.
- Szigeti, Martin (2007). "Operation Türkenkreuz" [Operation Turk's Cross]. Klassiker der Luftfahrt (in German). No. 5/07. Stuttgart: Motor Presse Stuttgart. pp. 28–35.
