= Zeppelin-Staaken R.XV =

General information
- Type: Bomber
- National origin: Germany
- Manufacturer: Schütte-Lanz
- Designer: Graf von Zeppelin
- Primary user: Luftstreitkräfte

History
- First flight: 25 July 1918
- Developed from: Zeppelin-Staaken R.XIV

The Zeppelin-Staaken R.XV was an Imperial German bomber of World War I. An incremental improvement to the Zeppelin-Staaken R.VI, this was one of a series of large strategic bombers called Riesenflugzeuge, intended to be less vulnerable than dirigibles in use at the time.

== Development ==
Almost identical to the R.XIV, the R.XV had a lighter airframe and more refined aerodynamics, in an effort to improve performance. Three aircraft were ordered, (R.46 to R.48), all three being completed by 1 September 1918.

As with most Zeppelin Riesenflugzeuge, the R.XV had two engine pods with four engines in a push-pull configuration, large enough for some inflight maintenance. Additional power was provided by a fifth engine mounted in the nose of the aircraft.

== Operational history ==
At least two of the R.XVs built saw action on the Western Front, late in 1918.

== Operators ==
- German Empire

== Specifications (Zeppelin-Staaken R.XV) ==
Data from The German Giants

General characteristics

- Crew: seven
- Length: 22.5 m (73 ft 10 in)
- Wingspan: 42.2 m (138 ft 5 in)
- Height: 6.3 m (20 ft 8 in)
- Wing area: 334 m^{2} (3,600 sq ft)
- Empty weight: 7,921 kg (17,463 lb)
- Gross weight: 14,450 kg (31,857 lb)
- Powerplant: 5 × Maybach Mb.IVa 6-cyl. water-cooled in-line piston engines, 183 kW (245 hp) each

Performance

- Cruise speed: 130 km/h (81 mph, 70 kn)
- Range: 800 km (500 mi, 430 nmi)

Armament
