= Zeppelin-Staaken R.VII =

General information
- Type: Bomber
- National origin: German Empire
- Manufacturer: Flugzeugwerft GmbH, Staaken, Berlin
- Designer: Graf von Zeppelin
- Primary user: Luftstreitkräfte
- Number built: 1

History
- First flight: 1917

The Zeppelin-Staaken R.VII was six-engined large bomber - a Riesenflugzeug - of Imperial Germany, intended to be less vulnerable than the airships in use at the time.

== Development ==
The R.VII, an incremental improvement on the almost identical Zeppelin-Staaken R.IV, had two engine pods, each with tandem pusher engines, large enough for some inflight maintenance by flight mechanics housed in cockpits forward of the nacelle engines, driving the large pusher propellers through clutches, gearboxes, and shafts. A further two engines were mounted in the nose of the fuselage, driving a single tractor propeller in a similar fashion.

== Operational history ==
First flown early in 1917, the sole R.VII (R.14/15) was accepted by the Deutsche Luftstreitkräfte (Imperial German Air Service) on 3 July 1917 and assigned to Rfa 501 on 29 July 1917. Used in operations on the Western Front, the R.VII had a short operational life, crashing due to a clutch failure and the incorrect actions of a flight mechanic, with the loss of six crew members.

== Operators ==
- German Empire

== Specifications (Zeppelin-Staaken R.VII) ==
Data from The German Giants,

General characteristics

- Crew: seven+
- Length: 22.1 m (72 ft 6 in)
- Wingspan: 42.2 m (138 ft 5 in)
- Height: 6.8 m (22 ft 4 in)
- Wing area: 332 m^{2} (3,570 sq ft)
- Empty weight: 8,923 kg (19,672 lb)
- Gross weight: 12,953 kg (28,556 lb)
- Fuel capacity: 2,140 kg (4,720 lb) consisting of:
  - Twelve 245 L (53.89 imp gal; 64.72 US gal) tanks holding 3,140 L (690.70 imp gal; 829.50 US gal)
  - Gravity tank of 155 L (34.10 imp gal; 40.95 US gal)
  - Oil tank holding 171 L (37.61 imp gal; 45.17 US gal)
- Disposable load: 1,890 kg (4,170 lb)
- Powerplant: 2 × Mercedes D.III 6-cyl. water-cooled in-line piston engines, 120 kW (160 hp) each driving a single tractor propeller through clutches, gearbox and transmission shafts
- Powerplant: 4 × Benz Bz.IV 6-cyl. water-cooled inline piston engines, 160 kW (220 hp) each in tandem pairs driving single pusher propellers through clutches, gearbox and transmission shafts
- Propellers: 4-bladed tractor propeller, 4.2 m (13 ft 9 in) diameter 4-bladed pusher propellers 4.1 m (13 ft 5 in) diameter

Performance

- Maximum speed: 130 km/h (81 mph, 70 kn)
- Service ceiling: 3,850 m (12,630 ft)
- Time to altitude:
  - 1,000 m (3,300 ft) in 12 minutes.
  - 2,000 m (6,600 ft) in 25.5 minutes.
  - 3,000 m (9,800 ft) in 50 minutes.
- Wing loading: 39 kg/m^{2} (8.0 lb/sq ft)

Armament

- Guns: provision for up to six machine-guns
