= Zeppelin-Staaken R.XVI =

German bomber plane

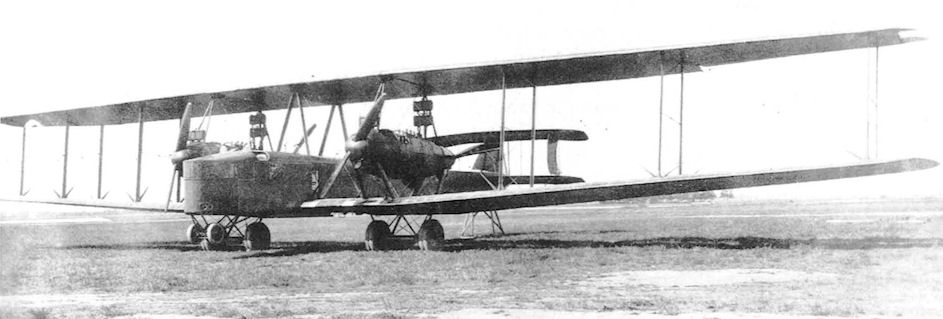
- Zeppelin-Staaken R.XVI (R.50)

General information
- Type: Bomber
- National origin: Germany
- Manufacturer: Schütte-Lanz
- Designer: Graf von Zeppelin
- Primary user: Luftstreitkräfte

History
- First flight: 1918

The Zeppelin-Staaken R.XVI(Av) was a very large bomber (Riesenflugzeug), designed and built in Germany during 1918.

== Development ==
The R.XVI, an incremental improvement to the Zeppelin-Staaken R.VI, was one of a series of large bombers called Riesenflugzeuge, intended to be less vulnerable than dirigibles in use at the time. The R.XVI had four engines in a push-pull configuration, mounted in nacelles large enough for some inflight maintenance by flight mechanics, housed in nacelles between the engines.

Three aircraft were ordered to be completed by Automobil & Aviatik A.G., at Leipzig-Heiterblick. Only two R.XVIs were completed and only one of these, (R.49), flew before the Armistice on 11 November 1918. The third R.XVI (R.51) was 3/4 complete at the Armistice but was never completed.

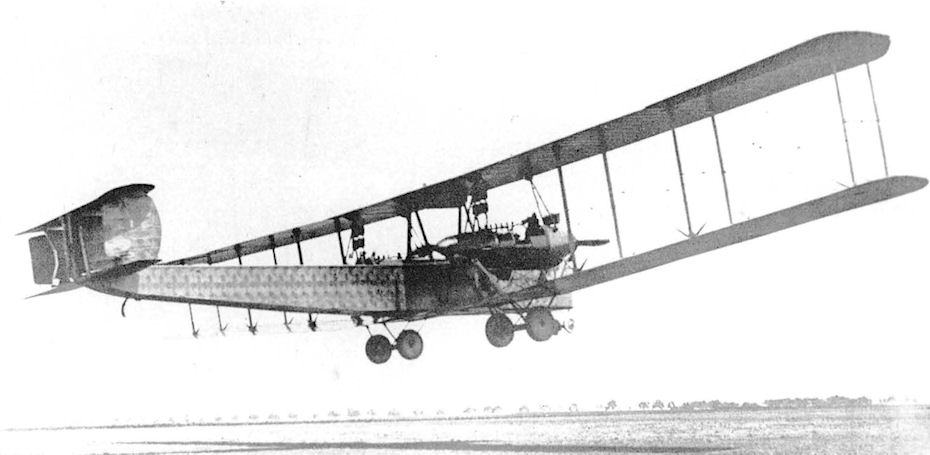
R.50 in flight.

== Operational history ==
Flight testing was carried out by R.49 during the war from September 1918, until a landing accident in October caused significant damage which was unlikely to have been repaired. The second aircraft, (R.50), was completed in 1919 as a civilian airliner, continuing the flight test programme until being flown to Döberitz for storage in November 1919.

== Specifications (Zeppelin-Staaken R.XVI(Av)) ==
Data from

General characteristics

- Crew: seven
- Length: 22.5 m (73 ft 10 in)
- Wingspan: 42.2 m (138 ft 5 in)
- Height: 6.5 m (21 ft 4 in)
- Wing area: 340 m^{2} (3,700 sq ft)
- Empty weight: 10,400 kg (22,928 lb)
- Gross weight: 14,650 kg (32,298 lb)
- Powerplant: 2 × Benz Bz.VI (pusher) V-12 water-cooled piston engines, 400 kW (530 hp) each
- Powerplant: 2 × Benz Bz.IV (tractor) 6-cyl. water-cooled in-line piston engines, 160 kW (220 hp) each
- Propellers: 2-bladed fixed-pitch wooden tractor and pusher propellers

Performance

- Maximum speed: 130 km/h (81 mph, 70 kn)
- Cruise speed: 135 km/h (84 mph, 73 kn)
- Range: 800 km (500 mi, 430 nmi)
- Service ceiling: 3,710 m (12,170 ft)

Armament

- Guns: Provision for nose, dorsal, ventral and two upper-wing machine-gun positions
