= Ca' Dolfin Tiepolos =

Series of paintings by Giovanni Battista Tiepolo

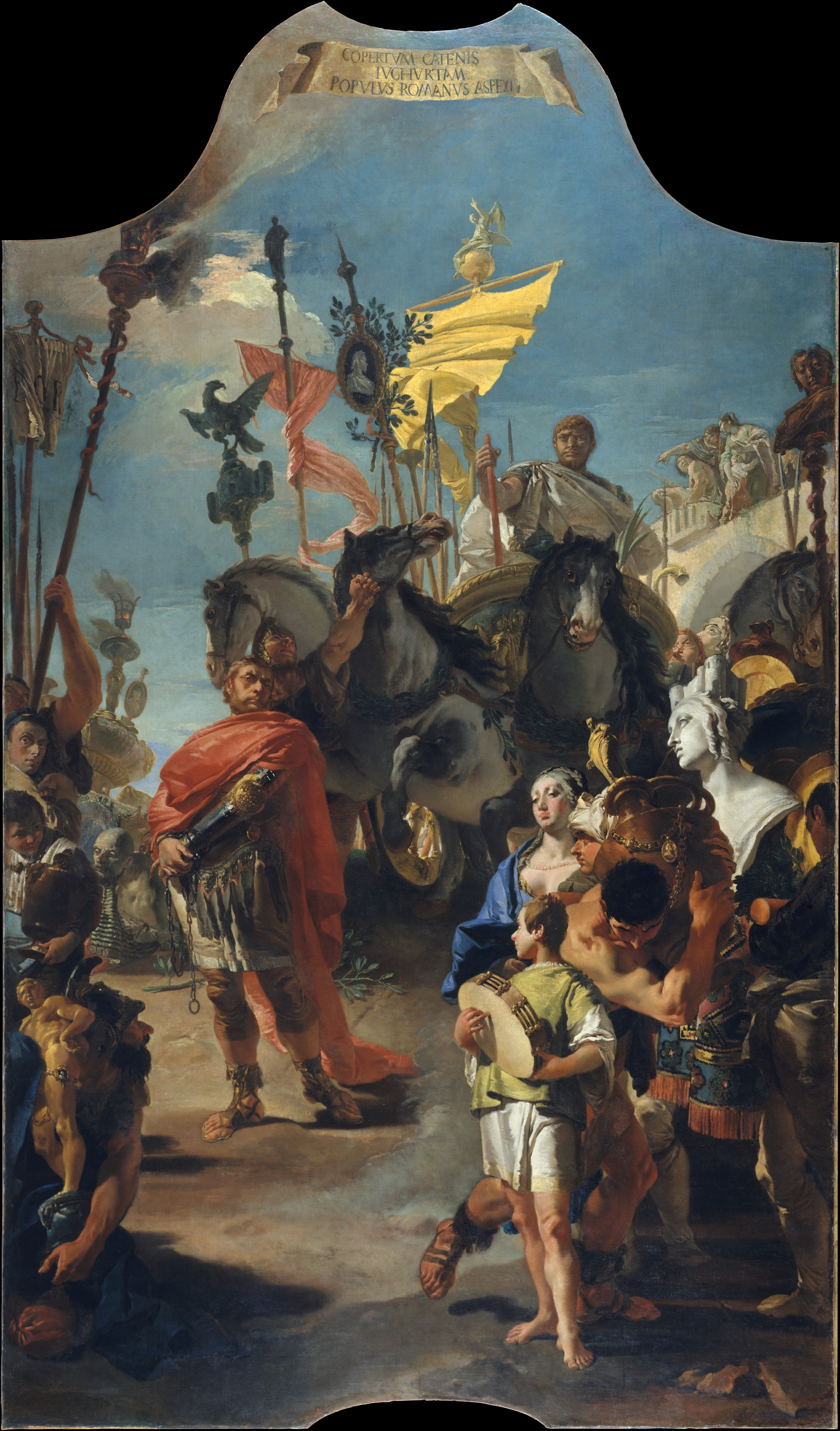
The Triumph of Marius, Metropolitan Museum of Art, New York

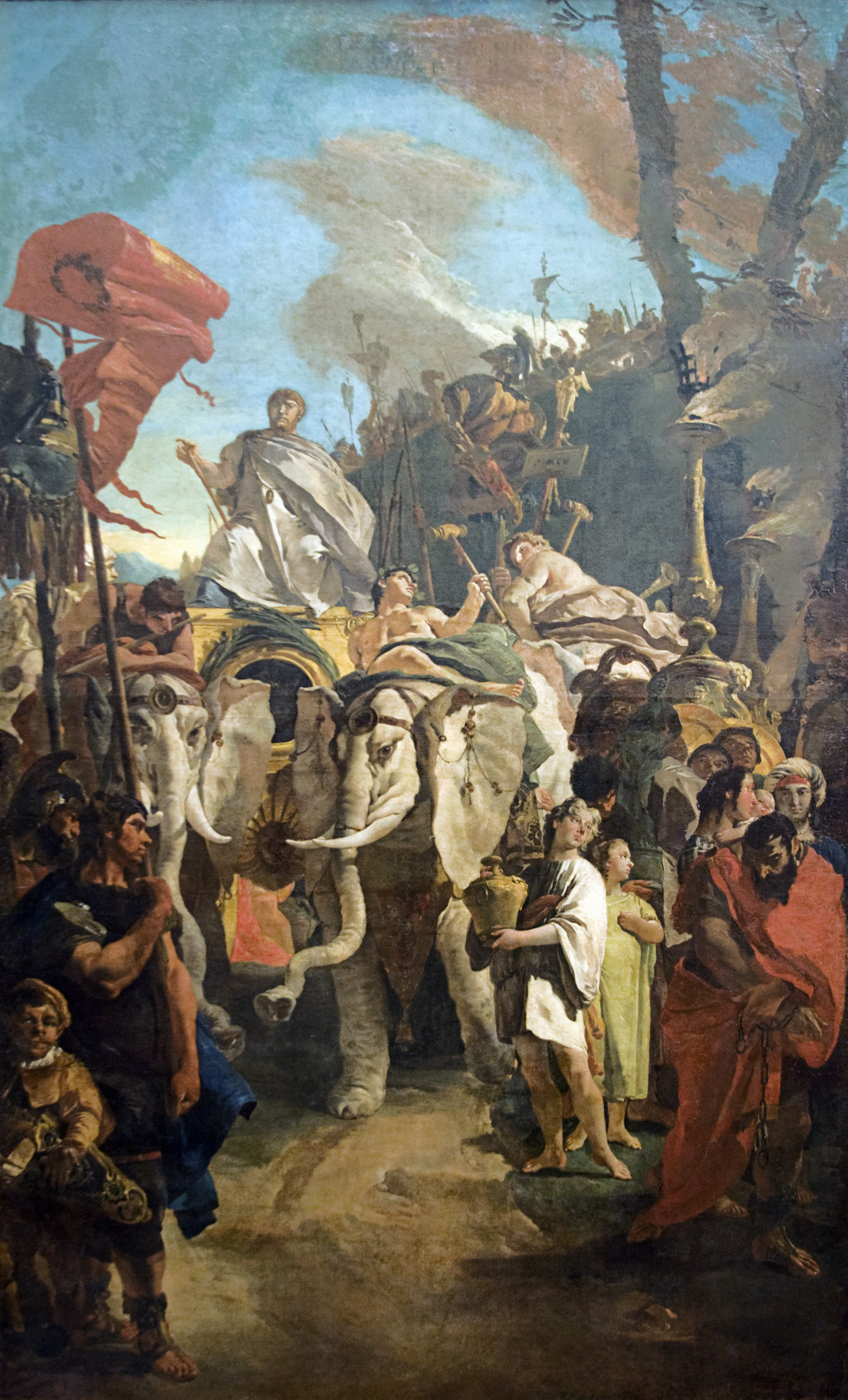
The Triumph of Manius Curius Dentatus (also known as The Tarantine Triumph), Hermitage, St Petersburg

The Ca' Dolfin Tiepolos are a series of ten oil paintings made c.1726–1729 by Giovanni Battista Tiepolo for the main reception room or salone of the Palazzo Ca' Dolfin, the palazzo of the patrician Dolfin family (sometimes spelled Delfini, Delfino, or Delfin) in Venice. The paintings are theatrical depictions of events from the history of Ancient Rome, with a typically Venetian emphasis on drama and impact rather than historical accuracy. They were painted on shaped canvases and set into the architecture with frescoed surrounds.

The Tarantine Triumph was the first work completed, depicting the triumph awarded to Manius Curius Dentatus after defeating Pyrrhus of Epirus in the Battle of Beneventum, the last battle of the Pyrrhic War in 275 BC, at which captured elephants were first seen in Rome. The Triumph of Marius was the last completed, depicting the triumph awarded to Gaius Marius after defeating Jugurtha of Numidia in the Jugurthine War: it is dated 1729, and includes a self-portrait of Tiepolo on the left. The differences in style and composition between the works demonstrate Tiepolio's rapid development as a painter.

The series was quickly recognised as a masterpiece, and its success drove forward Tiepolo's career. He decorated buildings across Venice and the Veneto in the following decades. The paintings remained in Venice until sold in 1872, and are now held in three museums, with two held by the Kunsthistorisches Museum in Vienna, three by the Metropolitan Museum of Art in New York, and five by the Hermitage Museum in St Petersburg.

== Background ==
Tiepolo was born in 1696. While still a young man in his 20s, he was commissioned by Dionisio Dolfin, the Patriarch of Aquileia, to decorate the Cappella del Santissimo Sacramento in Udine Cathedral (completed 1726) and then to paint a two cycles of Old Testament paintings for the Patriarchal Palace (or arcivescovado) in Udine (completed 1726–1728), including Rachel hiding Laban's idols and Sarah and the archangels. The paintings from the Patriarchal Palace are now displayed in Udine's Museo diocesano e gallerie del Tiepolo.

Still only in his early 30s, Tiepolo was then commissioned by Dionisio's brother Daniele to paint a series of ten painting depicting scenes from Ancient Rome for a large reception room on the piano nobile at the family's house in Venice, the Ca' Dolfin building, on the north side of the Rio di Ca' Foscari just off the Grand Canal. The building had been constructed by the Secco family, and acquired by Cardinal Giovanni Dolfin in 1621. Before Tiepolo began work, the room had already been partially decorated with trompe-l'œil wall paintings by Antonio Felice Ferrari c.1708 and ceiling frescos by Niccolò Bambini c.1714. Gaps in the walls had been left, filled with blank canvases to be painted in oils later: the combination of fresco and oil painting is unusual, but allows artists to switch between mediums according to the season.

== Description ==
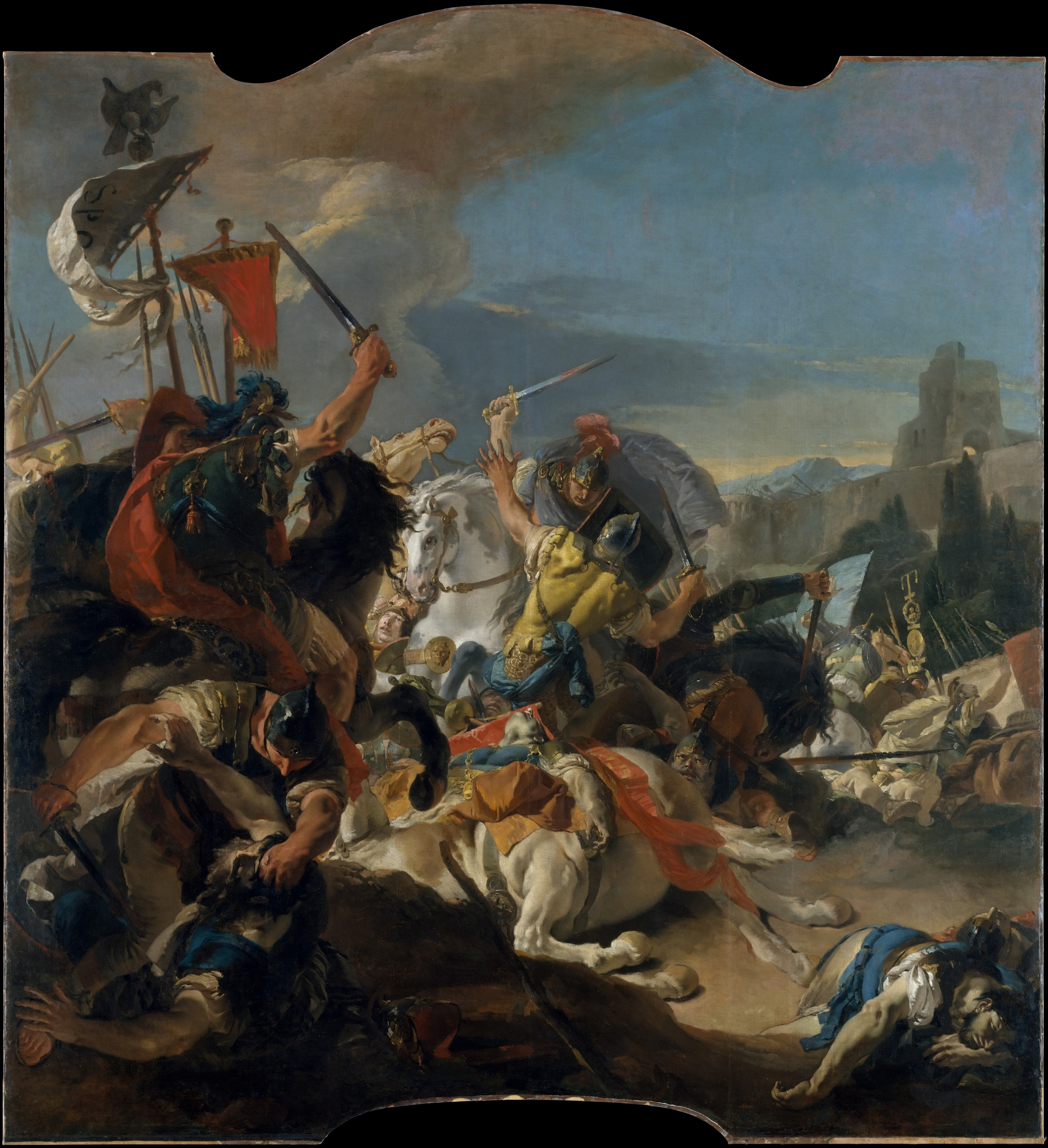
The Battle of Vercellae, Metropolitan Museum of Art, New York

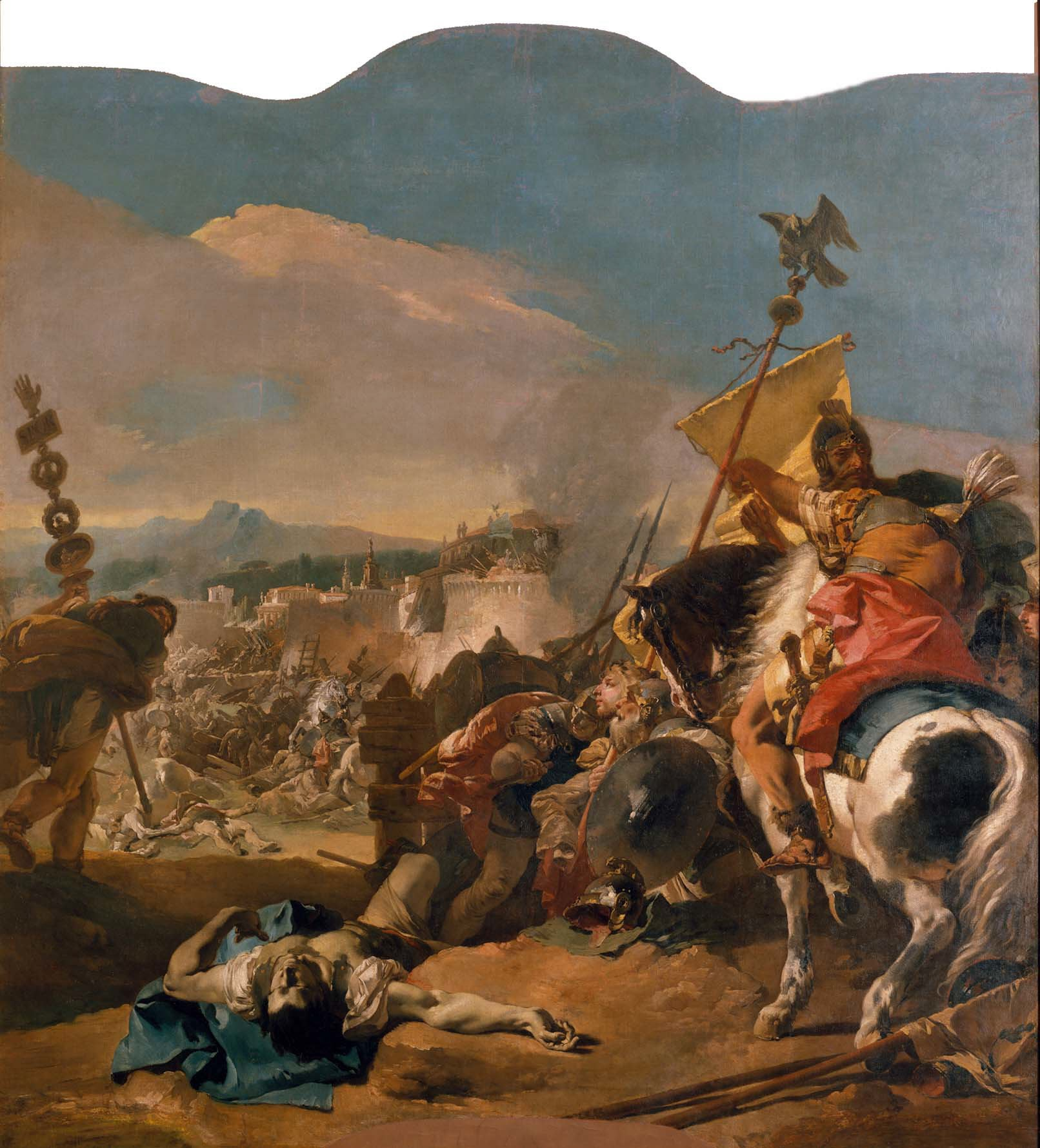
The Capture of Carthage, Metropolitan Museum of Art, New York

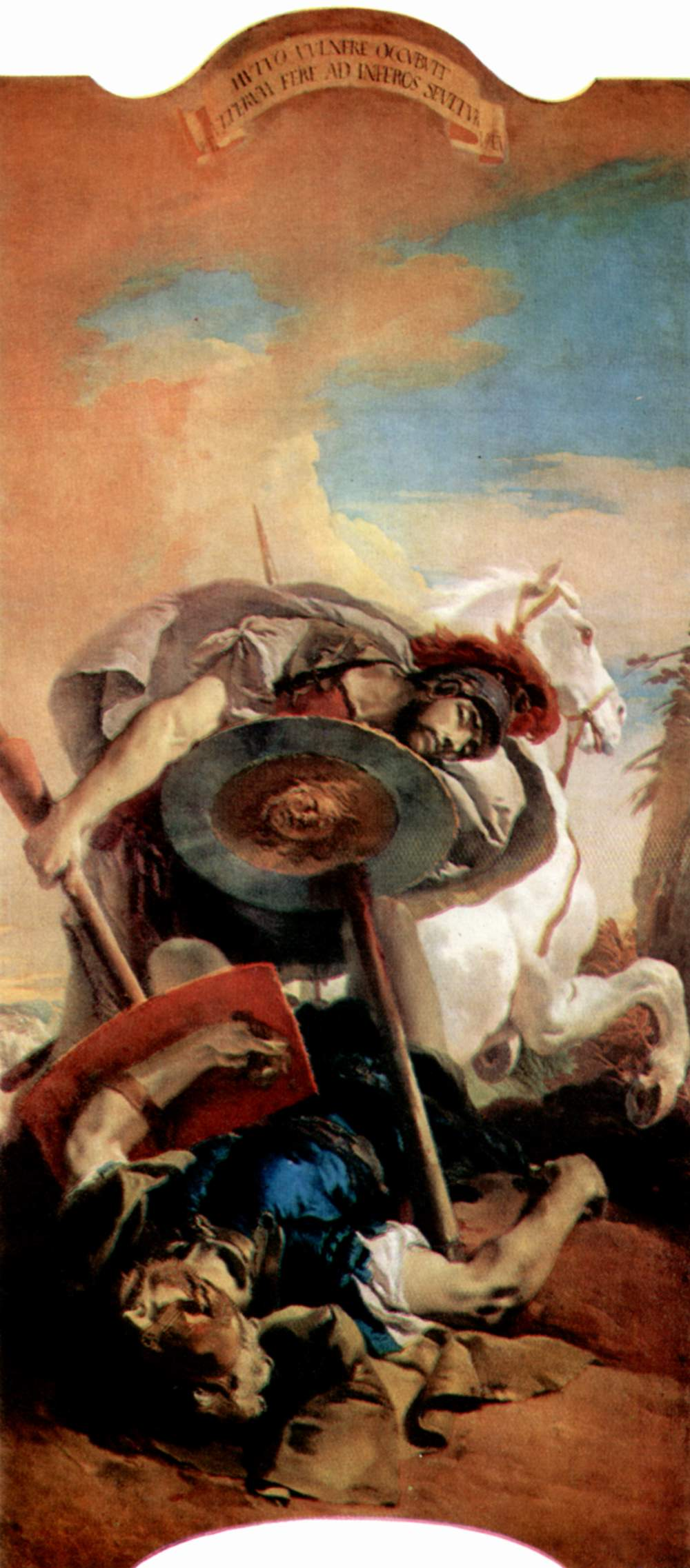
The Death of Lucius Junius Brutus and Arruns Tarquinius, Kunsthistorisches Museum, Vienna Vercellae.jpg

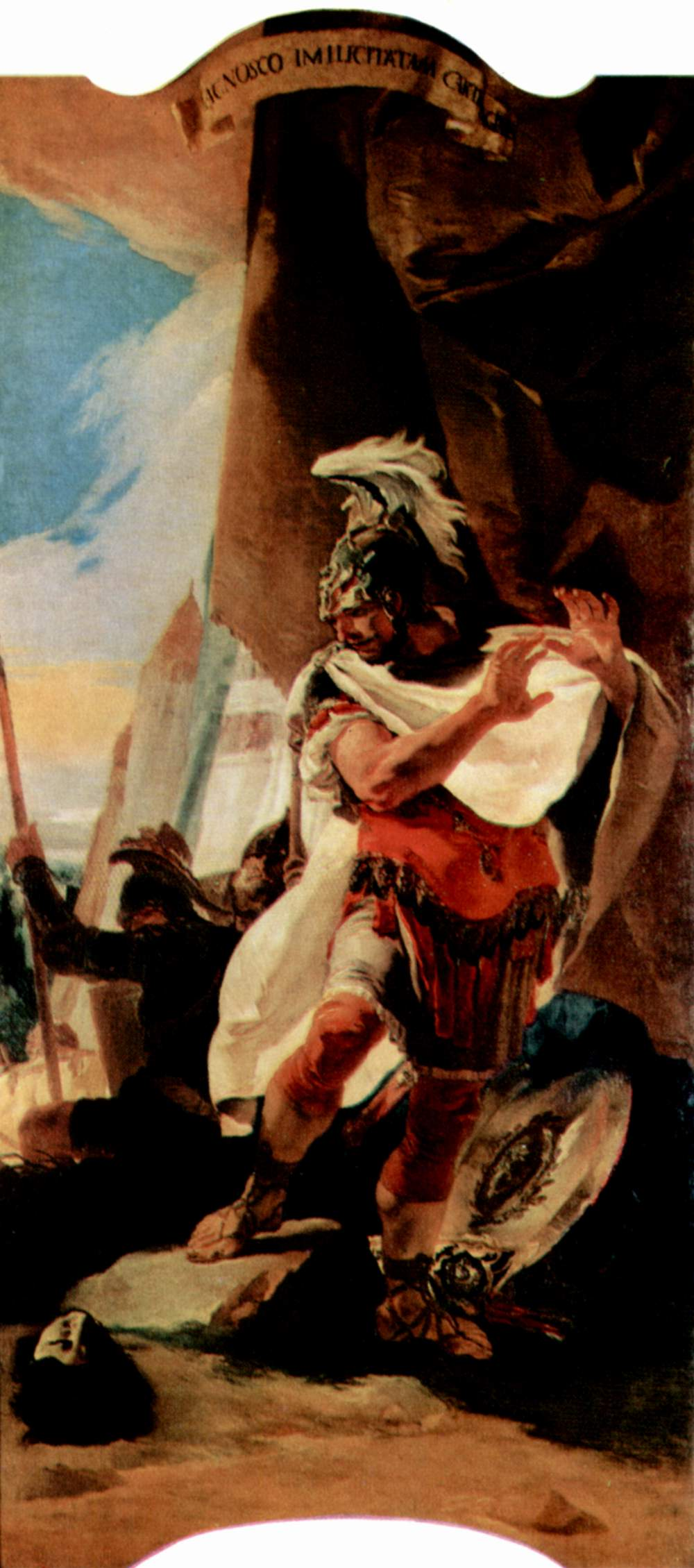
Hannibal Contemplating the Head of Hasdrubal, Kunsthistorisches Museum, Vienna

The paintings are reconstructions of historical scenes from Ancient Rome. In several cases, the identification of the intended subjects are not certain, but they appear to be an account of the expansion of the Roman Empire, from the (possibly legendary) event when Scaevloa thrust his hand into the sacrificial fire before Lars Porsena c.509 BC and the deaths of Lucius Junius Brutus and Arruns Tarquinius (son of Tarquin the Proud) at the Battle of Silva Arsia in 509 BC, through the wars against the Latin tribes of Italy, including Gaius Marcius Coriolanus and Lucius Quinctius Cincinnatus fighting against the Volsci, Corioli and Aequi in the 5th and 4th centuries BC, the victory of Manius Curius Dentatus over Pyrrhus of Epirus near Taranto in 275 BC, the Second Punic War at the end of the 3rd century including Quintus Fabius Maximus, Hannibal, and the capture of Carthage, to the victory of Gaius Marius over the Cimbri at the Battle of Vercellae in 101 BC. It is possible that the victory of the Romans over Carthage was intended as an allegory for the victory of the Republic of Venice over the Ottoman Empire.

The irregular profiles of the canvases were determined by the architectural features into which they were inserted. The 11 by 17 metres (36 ft × 56 ft) room in Venice has survived, with the recesses now filled with mirrors, so shape of the canvases allows a reconstruction of the original arrangement of the paintings in the room.

On the long walls to either side of the main door on the north side were two battle scenes, each measuring approximately 410 by 380 centimetres (160 in × 150 in), and usually identified as The Capture of Carthage and The Battle of Vercellae (both at the Metropolitan Museum of Art in New York). (Alternatively, they may represent battles of Coriolanus against the Volsci and Corioli.) The opposite long wall has five arched windows overlooking the canal to the south. Two narrower canvases, each approximately 380 by 180 centimetres (150 in × 71 in), were placed to either side of the central window, depicting The Death of Lucius Junius Brutus and Arruns Tarquinius, and Hannibal Contemplating the Head of Hasdrubal (both at the Kunsthistorisches Museum in Vienna).

There were three paintings on the shorter walls to either side, with one large central painting flanked by two smaller ones. The paintings on the west wall, lit from the windows to the south, were The Triumph of Marius (also in New York) flanked by Quintus Fabius Maximus before the Senate of Carthage and Cincinnatus Offered the Dictatorship, and on the east wall opposite were The Tarantine Triumph flanked by Mucius Scaevola before Porsenna and Veturia Pleading with Coriolanus (all five at the Hermitage in St Petersburg). The tall central scenes measure approximately 550 by 320 centimetres (220 in × 130 in), and each of the four flaking scenes is approximately 390 by 230 centimetres (154 in × 91 in).

Apart from the two battle scenes, the other eight canvases had banderoles explaining the subject, with Latin text taken from the Epitome of Roman History ("Epitome de T. Livio Bellorum omnium annorum DCC Libri duo"), an early 2nd century commentary attributed to Lucius Annaeus Florus on the 1st century AD History of Rome of Livy. The banderoles were painted over after the paintings were removed, but some have been restored later. The shapes of the canvases were also altered when they were removed from their original location in 1872, with additional areas added to square them off, but those in New York and Vienna have been restored to their original shapes.

Tiepolo adopted a less retrained palette for these paintings than his earlier works, with elements of the Baroque or even the Rococo.

== Reception ==
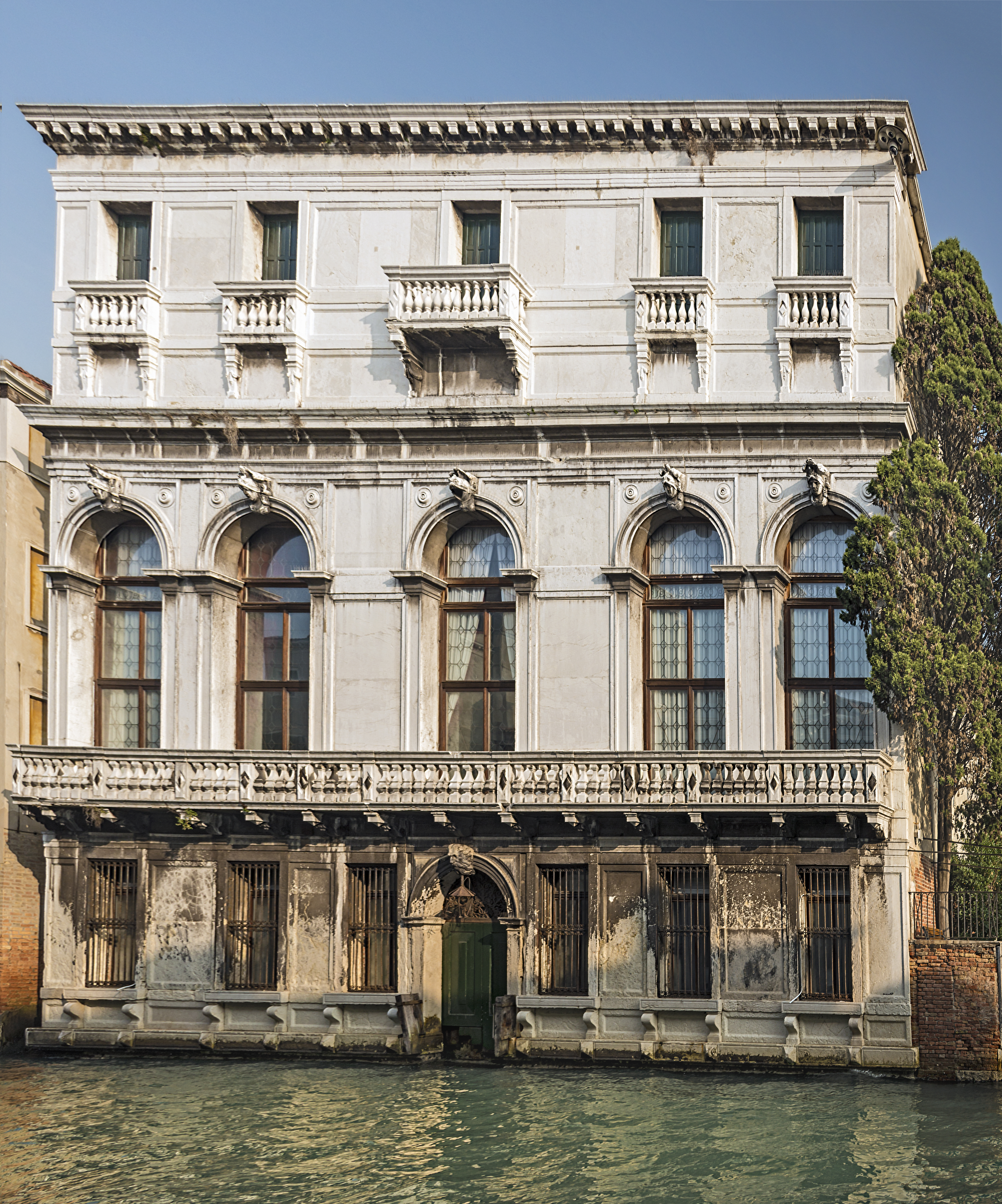
Ca' Dolfin from the Rio di Ca'Foscari

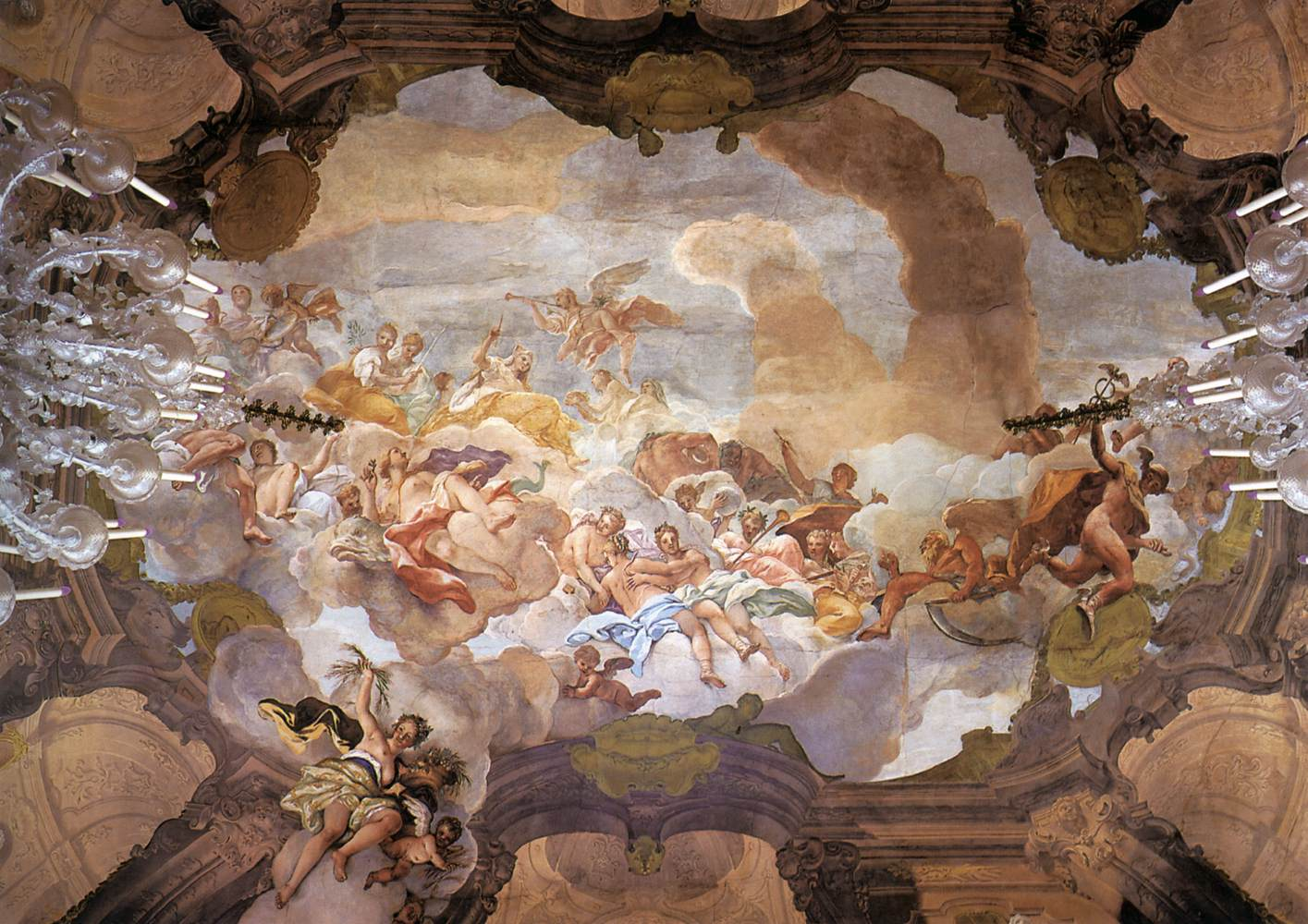
Ceiling fresco of a mythological scene, depicting the glorification of Venice and the Delfino family, by Niccolò Bambini, c.1714

The paintings were quickly recognised as a masterpiece, praised by Vincenzo da Canal in 1732 as among Teipolo's best, and by Jean-Honoré Fragonard in 1761 as among his most beautiful works in Venice. They remained in situ for over 200 years while the building was inherited by increasingly distant descendants of the Dolfin family, but the building was largely abandoned by 1870. The Palazzo Ca' Dolfin was acquired by the Ca' Foscari University of Venice in 1955, based at the Ca' Foscari nearby; restored, it is used as a guesthouse by the university, with the salone becoming the "Aula Magna", a great hall for events.

To pay a tax bill, a family descendant sold the paintings in 1872 via the art dealer Moses Michelangelo Guggenheim to the Austrian collector Baron Eugen Miller von Aichholz for 50,000 livres. The Baron had nowhere to display them: within a few years, he put them on sale again in Paris, and five were acquired by Alexander Polovtsov (sometimes spelled Polovzeff). In 1886, Polovtsov presented them to the Central School of Technical Drawing, which had been founded in St Petersburg by his father-in-law Alexander von Stieglitz. These five paintings have been held by the Hermitage Museum in St Petersburg since 1934.

The remaining five paintings were returned to Vienna and eventually displayed at the Baron's new Palais Miller von Aichholz. After the Baron's death in 1919, they were bought with the house by the Italian financier Camillo Castiglioni. After Castiglioni became bankrupt in 1924, two of the smaller paintings were sold to the Kunsthistorisches Museum in Vienna in 1930, and the three others were used as collateral for a loan from Dr Stefan Mendel, co-heir of the Austrian Ankerbrot bakery business. They were stored in Zurich, and Mendel acquired them outright in 1935. He took them to New York when he emigrated, and they were kept in storage in Saranac Lake, New York for 30 years. After Mendel's death in 1965, they were sold by his estate to the Metropolitan Museum of Art in New York.

After a gallery at the Metropolitan Museum had been extended to creates a suitable space to hang them, and considerable restoration work, most of the paintings were reunited in New York for an exhibition in 1997.
