= Hansa-Brandenburg W.23 =

W.23

General information
- Type: Flying-boat fighter
- Manufacturer: Hansa und Brandenburgische Flugzeug-Werke
- Designer: Ernst Heinkel
- Number built: 3

History
- First flight: 1917

The Hansa-Brandenburg W.23 was a prototype biplane flying-boat fighter designed by the Hansa-Brandenburg Aircraft Company (Hansa Brandenburgische Flugzeugwerke) for the Imperial German Navy's (Kaiserliche Marine) Naval Air Service (Marine-Fliegerabteilung) during World War I. Three aircraft were ordered in 1917 and delivered the following year, but it was not ordered into production.

== Design and development ==
The W.23 was the culmination of the company's line of pusher configuration flying-boat biplane fighters reaching back to 1916's CC, all of which had a swept lower wing, wing floats, and a single-step hull to allow the aircraft to break free from the water more easily. It greatly resembled the preceding W.18, but its hull was longer and it had a water-cooled 160-metric-horsepower (118 kW) Mercedes D.III straight-six engine that drove a two-bladed, fixed-pitch propeller. The aircraft's armament consisted of a 7.92-millimeter (0.312 in) LMG 08/15 and a 20-millimeter (0.79 in) Becker autocannon, both mounted in the upper deck of the nose.

Three prototypes were ordered in June 1917 and were delivered to the Seaplane Experimental Command (Seeflugzeug-Versuchs-Kommando) in June 1918. Details are scanty, but aviation historians William Green and Gordon Swanborough state that the W.23's flight characteristics were so poor that the program was cancelled. Two aircraft were located at Seddin when the Allies inspected the German seaplane bases in December 1918. Their ultimate fate is unknown, but it is likely that they were scrapped.

== Specifications ==
Data from Hansa-Brandenburg Aircraft of WWI: Volume 2–Biplane Seaplanes. Great War Aviation Centennial Series

General characteristics

- Crew: 1
- Length: 9.13 m (29 ft 11 in) overall
- Upper wingspan: 10.7 m (35 ft 1 in)
- Lower wingspan: 10.24 m (33 ft 7 in)
- Height: 3.6 m (11 ft 10 in)
- Wing area: 34.7 m^{2} (374 sq ft)
- Empty weight: 918 kg (2,024 lb)
- Gross weight: 1,261 kg (2,780 lb)
- Powerplant: 1 × Mercedes D.III water-cooled straight-six engine, 120 kW (160 hp)
- Propellers: 2-bladed fixed-pitch propeller

Performance

- Maximum speed: 165 km/h (103 mph, 89 kn)
- Service ceiling: 3,000 m (9,800 ft)
- Time to altitude:

- 800 m (2,600 ft) in 6 minutes
- 1,000 m (3,300 ft) in 7 minutes
- 1,500 m (4,900 ft) in 12 minutes
- 2,000 m (6,600 ft) in 18 minutes 12 seconds
- 3,000 m (9,800 ft) in 38 minutes 18 seconds

Armament

- Guns: *1 × fixed, forward-firing 7.92 mm (0.312 in) LMG 08/15 machine gun
- 1 × 20 mm (0.8 in) Becker autocannon

== See also ==
Related lists

- List of military aircraft of Germany
- List of flying boats and floatplanes

== Bibliography ==
- Andersson, Lennart & Sanger, Ray (2014). Retribution and Recovery: German Aircraft and Aviation 1919 to 1922. Air-Britain (Historians). ISBN 978-0-85130-467-0.
- Green, William & Swanborough, Gordon (2001) [1994]. The Complete Book of Fighters: An Illustrated Encyclopedia of Every Fighter Built and Flown (Revised and Updated ed.). Salamander Books. ISBN 1-84065-269-1.
- Owers, Colin A. (2015). Hansa-Brandenburg Aircraft of WWI: Volume 2–Biplane Seaplanes. Great War Aviation Centennial Series. Vol. 18. n.p.: Aeronaut Books. ISBN 978-1-935881-32-2.
