= Hansa-Brandenburg W.25 =

WWI German floatplane

W.25
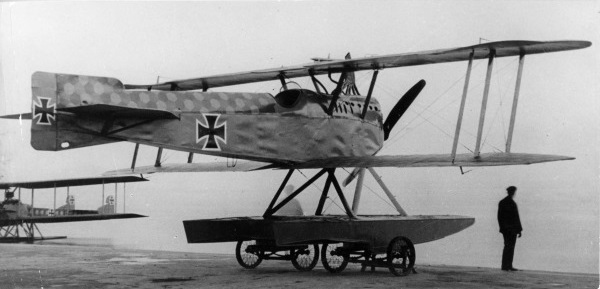

General information
- Type: Floatplane fighter
- National origin: Germany
- Manufacturer: Hansa-Brandenburg
- Number built: 1

History
- First flight: 1918
- Developed from: Hansa-Brandenburg KDW

The Hansa-Brandenburg W.25 was a prototype floatplane fighter built by the Hansa-Brandenburg Aircraft Company (Hansa Brandenburgische Flugzeugwerke) for the Imperial German Navy's (Kaiserliche Marine) Naval Air Service (Marine-Fliegerabteilung) during World War I. It was a modified version of the company's single-seat KDW fighter, but it was not accepted for service.

== Design and development ==
The W.25 was an improved version of the single-seat biplane KDW with a modified single-bay wing with conventional inter-plane struts. It used a water-cooled 150-metric-horsepower (110 kW) Maybach Mb.III straight-six engine rather than the Benz Bz.III engine of the KDW. One prototype was built with ailerons only on the upper wing, but maneuverability was unsatisfactory. It was then modified with a second pair of ailerons on the lower wing connected to the upper ailerons by a strut. The armament consisted of two fixed, forward-firing 7.92-millimeter (0.312 in) LMG 08/15 machine guns.

The sole prototype of the W.25 was delivered to the Seaplane Experimental Command (Seeflugzeug-Versuchs-Kommando) in February 1918. It did not enter production because the Naval Air Service had lost interest in single-seat floatplane fighters by this time. The aircraft was then used as a training aircraft. It was located at Rügen-Bug when the Allies inspected the German seaplane bases in December 1918. Its ultimate fate is unknown, but it was likely scrapped.

== Specifications (W.25) ==
Data from German Aircraft of the First World War; Hansa-Brandenburg Aircraft of WWI: Volume 2–Biplane Seaplanes. Great War Aviation Centennial Series

General characteristics

- Crew: 1
- Length: 8.8 m (28 ft 10 in)
- Wingspan: 10.4 m (34 ft 1 in)
- Height: 3.45 m (11 ft 4 in)
- Wing area: 36.53 m^{2} (393.2 sq ft)
- Empty weight: 918 kg (2,024 lb)
- Gross weight: 1,182 kg (2,606 lb)
- Powerplant: 1 × Benz Bz.III water-cooled straight-six engine, 110 kW (150 hp)
- Propellers: 2-bladed fixed-pitch propeller

Performance

- Maximum speed: 160 km/h (99 mph, 86 kn)
- Endurance: 2 hours 30 minutes
- Time to altitude: 6 minutes 30 seconds to1,000 m (3,300 ft)

Armament

- Guns: 2 x fixed forward-firing synchronised 7.92 mm (0.312 in) LMG 08/15 Spandau machine guns

== See also ==
Related lists

- List of flying boats and floatplanes

== Bibliography ==
- Andersson, Lennart & Sanger, Ray (2014). Retribution and Recovery: German Aircraft and Aviation 1919 to 1922. Air-Britain (Historians). ISBN 978-0-85130-467-0.
- Gray, Peter & Thetford, Owen (1987) [1970]. German Aircraft of the First World War (2nd ed.). Putnam. ISBN 0-85177-809-7.
- Green, William & Swanborough, Gordon (2001) [1994]. The Complete Book of Fighters: An Illustrated Encyclopedia of Every Fighter Built and Flown (Revised and Updated ed.). Salamander Books. ISBN 1-84065-269-1.
- Owers, Colin A. (2015). Hansa-Brandenburg Aircraft of WWI: Volume 2–Biplane Seaplanes. Great War Aviation Centennial Series. Vol. 18. Aeronaut Books. ISBN 978-1-935881-32-2.
