= Hansa-Brandenburg W.17 =

WWI German flying boat

W.17

General information
- Type: Flying boat fighter
- National origin: Germany
- Manufacturer: Hansa-Brandenburg
- Number built: 2

History
- First flight: July 1917
- Developed from: Hansa-Brandenburg CC

The Hansa-Brandenburg W.17 was a single-seat fighter flying boat designed by the Hansa-Brandenburg Aircraft Company (Hansa Brandenburgische Flugzeugwerke) for the Austro-Hungarian Navy's (German: Kaiserlich und königlich Kriegsmarine) Naval Aviation (German: Kaiserlich und königlich Seefliegerkorps) during the First World War. It was developed from the Hansa-Brandenburg CC in 1917. Two prototypes may have been built, a biplane and possibly a triplane; the existence of the latter has not been confirmed. Neither was given a production contract after the biplane crashed.

== Design and development ==
Developed from the biplane, pusher configuration Hansa-Brandenburg CC, the first prototype (A49/I) of the W.17 shared that aircraft's general features, namely single-bay wings, wing floats, and a single-step hull to allow the aircraft to break free from the water more easily. It replaced the latter's star-shaped interplane struts with two angled struts on each side that connected the upper wing to the aircraft's hull. A cantilevered lower wing was used instead of the CC's swept lower wing and it used a water-cooled 200-metric-horsepower (147 kW) Hiero 6 straight-six engine. The armament was intended to consist of two fixed, forward-firing 8 mm (0.315 in) Schwarzlose MG-16ss machine guns.

A.49/I was completed in July 1917 and was tested by fighter ace Gottfried Banfield, who judged the aircraft unsuitable for service due to its poor maneuverability and that its lower wing lacked the necessary strength. It supposedly crashed in May 1918 when its upper wing broke away.

Aviation historians William Green and Gordon Swanborough state that there was a triplane second prototype (A49/II) with vertical interplane struts that was submitted to Naval Aviation for testing in July 1917, but no documentation confirming that has been found.

== See also ==
Related lists

- List of flying boats and floatplanes

== Bibliography ==
- Gray, Peter & Thetford, Owen (1987) [1970]. German Aircraft of the First World War (2nd ed.). Putnam. ISBN 0-85177-809-7.
- Green, William & Swanborough, Gordon (2001) [1994]. The Complete Book of Fighters: An Illustrated Encyclopedia of Every Fighter Built and Flown (Revised and Updated ed.). Salamander Books. ISBN 1-84065-269-1.
- Owers, Colin A. (2015). Hansa-Brandenburg Aircraft of WWI: Volume 2–Biplane Seaplanes. Great War Aviation Centennial Series. Vol. 18. Aeronaut Books. ISBN 978-1-935881-32-2.
