= Hansa-Brandenburg W.33 =

W.33
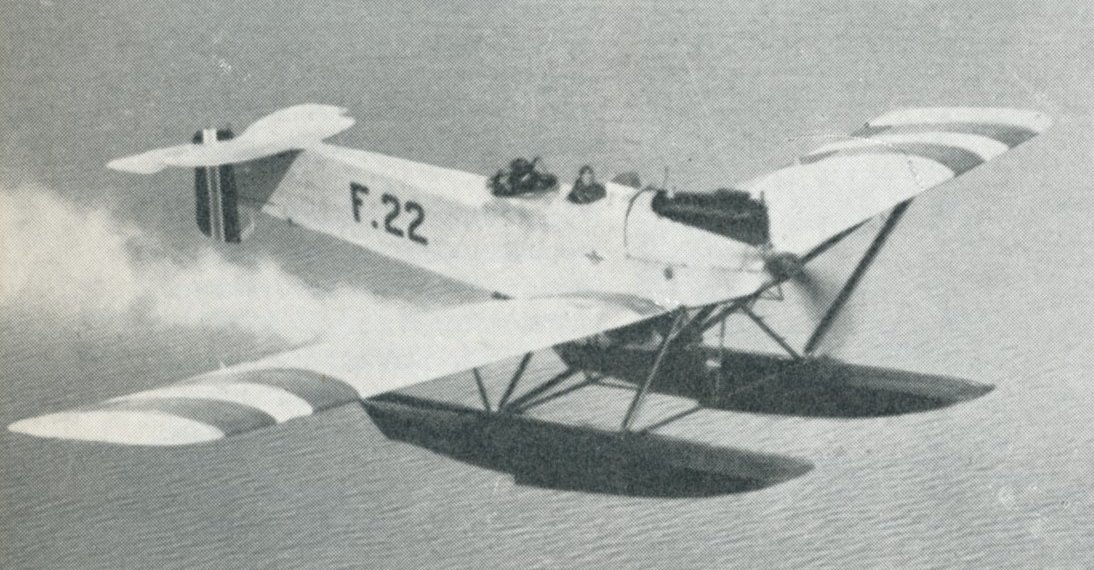

General information
- Type: Reconnaissance floatplane
- Manufacturer: Hansa und Brandenburgische Flugzeugwerke
- Designer: Hanns Klemm
- Primary users: Imperial Japanese Navy Finnish Air Force, German Imperial Navy
- Number built: 491

History
- Manufactured: 1918-1919 & 1921-1929
- Introduction date: 1918
- First flight: 1918
- Retired: 1936 (Finland)
- Developed from: Hansa-Brandenburg W.29
- Developed into: Hansa-Brandenburg W.34

Hansa-Brandenburg W.33 was a German two-seat, single-engined low-wing monoplane floatplane, which had been developed by Hansa und Brandenburgische Flugzeugwerke during World War I as a higher powered enlargement of the similar Hansa-Brandenburg W.29 and despite the increase in size the two types are very difficult to differentiate. Although the W.33 was built in small numbers during the war many license built versions were built after World War I.

== History ==
The Hansa-Brandenburg W.33 aircraft was designed in 1918 by Dr. Hanns Klemm and began entering German service in late 1918. The first examples were powered with a 190 kW (260 hp) 6 cylinder inline Maybach Mb.IVa, but 8 cylinder inline 190 kW (260 hp) Mercedes D.IVa and 205–224 kW (275–300 hp) 6 cylinder inline Basse und Selve BuS.IVa engines were also fitted.

26 aircraft were built by Hansa-Brandenburg, but only seven were completed before the armistice.

Licence production was carried out in Norway by Marinens Flyvebaatfabrikk (Naval Aircraft Factory) who built 24 for the Navy from 1920 until 1929 as the Maake II (or Make II in some translations), and Maake III, as well as one Maake III for the Army. These had followed the Maake I, which was a licence-built Hansa-Brandenburg W.29. In addition, six Maake IIs were completed at by Norsk Aeroplanefabrikk (Army Aircraft Factory) when the company initially contracted to build them failed to deliver, although these were later handed over to the Navy, along with four additional newly manufactured Maake IIIs built at Haerens Flyvenmaskinfabrikk/Kjeller Flyfabrikk, as the Army no longer had any need for them. The Maake IIIs had some minor detail differences from the Maake IIs. Most were built with 190 kW (260 hp) Mercedes D.IVa engines, although examples built before 1923 were fitted with similar Benz engines developing from 160 to 190 kW (220 to 260 hp). These were normally armed with a fixed Vickers machine gun and a flexible Lewis gun. Lamblin radiators were used on Norwegian examples in lieu of the car type radiator mounted ahead of the engine that was otherwise normal for the type. When the final examples were retired from the Navy in 1935 two examples were given civil registrations (N-47 and N-48) and briefly used to deliver mail.

In 1921, Finland obtained the manufacturing license for the W.33 and the first Finnish-built example flew on 4 November 1922, as the IVL A.22 Hansa. These were powered by 220 kW (300 hp) inline six-cylinder Fiat A-12bis engines due to shortages of the German engines. This was the first aircraft to be mass-produced in Finland and 120 were eventually built between 1922 and 1925, and the Finnish Air Force would operate the aircraft until 1936. Armament was similar to the Norwegian examples, although two Lewis guns were sometimes fitted. Some of the Finnish aircraft also had their floats replaced with skis.

Japan received a single W.33 as war reparations, and from 1922 to 1925, built 310 examples for the Imperial Japanese Navy. 160 of these were built by Nakajima and 150 were built by Aichi, with minor modifications, including the substitution of the German inline engine with a 160 kW (210 hp) water-cooled V-8 Mitsubishi Type Hi engine (a licence-built Hispano-Suiza V-8), and other detail changes to meet Japanese requirements. These were not popular in Japanese service due to inadequate directional control and poor downward visibility from the cockpit, but were flown from the battleship Nagato for seaplane trials in 1926. By 1927, they were gradually being replaced, and the last examples were retired from military service in 1928, although some of these would continue in civilian service after having been converted with a cabin to seat 3-5 passengers by the Ando Aeroplane Research Studio and Japan Air Transport Research Association.

Latvia received two IVL A.22s from the Finnish Air Force in December 1926, however both were completely wrecked the following March, prompting a major rebuild, which some sources have counted as two additional aircraft having been built. It took until 1928 before they had been returned to service, and they remained in use until 1933.

== Variants ==
Hansa-Brandenburg W.33C3MG
standard version, armed with two fixed and one flexible machine gun, five built during WW1
Hansa-Brandenburg W.33C2MG HFT
equipped with radio and armed with one fixed gun, and one flexible gun, one built during WW1
Hansa-Brandenburg W.33CK
two fixed machine guns and a flexible Becker 20 mm (0.79 in) cannon, one built during WW1

Hansa-Brandenburg Make II and III
Norwegian W.33s built under licence, 35 built.

IVL A.22 Hansa
Finnish license manufactured W.33, 120 built with 220 kW (300 hp) Fiat A-12bis engines.

== Operators ==
Finland
Finnish Air Force (Ilmavoimat)

German Empire
Kaiserliche Marine (Marinefliegerkorps)

Japan
Imperial Japanese Navy Air Service

Latvia
Latvian Navy / Air Force

Norway
Royal Norwegian Navy Air Service (Marinens flyvevesen)
Norwegian Army Air Service (Hærens flyvåpen)

== Survivors ==
The sole survivor of the type is an IVL A.22 Hansa in the Finnish Aviation Museum in Helsinki.

== Specifications (W.33CK) ==
Data from Hansa-Brandenburg : Aircraft of WWI Volume 3, Monoplane Seaplanes

General characteristics

- Crew: 2
- Length: 11.10 m (36 ft 5 in)
- Wingspan: 15.85 m (52 ft 0 in)
- Height: 3.37 m (11 ft 1 in)
- Wing area: 44.60 m^{2} (480.1 sq ft)
- Empty weight: 1,470 kg (3,241 lb)
- Gross weight: 2,100 kg (4,630 lb)
- Powerplant: 1 × Maybach Mb.IVa 6-cylinder water-cooled in-line piston engine, 183 kW (245 hp)
- Propellers: 2-bladed fixed-pitch propeller

Performance

- Maximum speed: 170 km/h (110 mph, 92 kn)
- Cruise speed: 154 km/h (96 mph, 83 kn)
- Service ceiling: 4,200 m (13,800 ft)
- Time to altitude: 1,000 m (3,300 ft) in 5 minutes 24 seconds

2,000 m (6,600 ft) in 12 minutes 48 seconds
3,000 m (9,800 ft) in 22 minutes 18 seconds

Armament

- Guns: 2 x fixed forward-firing machine-guns cockpit and optionally a 20 mm (0.787 in) Becker Type M2 cannon on a gun ring in the rear cockpit (fitted to msn.2538 only)

Avionics

- Radio was carried on some aircraft

== See also ==
Related development

- Hansa-Brandenburg W.29 (slightly smaller precursor)
- Hansa-Brandenburg W.34 (slightly larger development)

Related lists

- List of military aircraft of Germany
