= Hansa-Brandenburg GDW =

WWI German floatplane

GDW
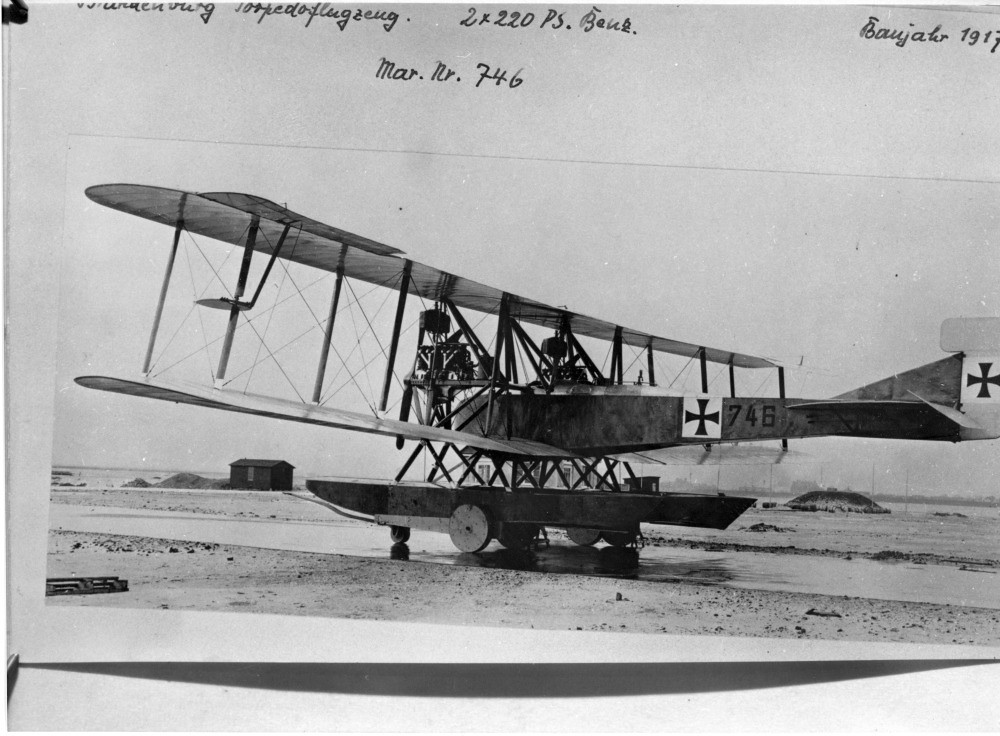

General information
- Type: Prototype floatplane torpedo bomber
- National origin: Germany
- Manufacturer: Hansa-Brandenburg
- Primary user: Imperial German Navy
- Number built: 1

History
- First flight: 1917
- Developed from: Hansa-Brandenburg GW

The Hansa-Brandenburg GDW was a prototype floatplane torpedo bomber built by the Hansa-Brandenburg Aircraft Company (Hansa Brandenburgische Flugzeugwerke) for the Imperial German Navy's (Kaiserliche Marine) Naval Air Service (Marine-Fliegerabteilung) during World War I. Developed from the GW, only a single aircraft was built. No production order ensued and the prototype was relegated to training duties.

== Design and development ==
Derived from the GW, it was larger and differed in detail. Like that aircraft, it was a conventional three-bay biplane design with equal-span wings intended to carry a heavier torpedo. The undercarriage consisted of two widely spaced floats to allow for the torpedo to be carried between them. The floats were attached to the fuselage and wings by multiple V-struts. The short nose was rounder and more streamlined than the GW and the wings were swept to the rear outboard of the engine nacelles. The aircraft used two water-cooled 200-metric-horsepower (147 kW) Benz Bz.IV straight-six engines positioned between the wings with the radiators mounted on the struts above the engines. A single prototype was ordered in April 1916, but was not delivered until December 1917. The official Seaplane Experimental Command (Seeflugzeug-Versuchs-Kommando) drawings of the aircraft as delivered show that the rudder extended above and below the fuselage and that the elevators were not balanced. Photographic evidence shows that the lower part of the rudder extending below the fuselage was removed and that the elevators were fitted with balances. The GDW was not used operationally and it was probably used for training.

== Specifications (GDW) ==
Data from Hansa-Brandenburg Aircraft of WWI: Volume 2–Biplane Seaplanes; German Aircraft of the First World War

General characteristics

- Crew: 2
- Length: 9.5 m (31 ft 2 in)
- Wingspan: 24.5 m (80 ft 5 in)
- Height: 5 m (16 ft 5 in)
- Wing area: 134 m^{2} (1,440 sq ft)
- Empty weight: 2,936 kg (6,473 lb)
- Gross weight: 4,851 kg (10,695 lb)
- Powerplant: 2 × Benz Bz.IV water-cooled straight-six engine, 150 kW (200 hp) each
- Propellers: 2-bladed fixed-pitch

Performance

- Maximum speed: 130 km/h (81 mph, 70 kn)
- Time to altitude: 1,000 m (3,300 ft) in 19 minutes 30 seconds

Armament

- Guns: 1 × 7.92 mm (0.312 in) Parabellum MG14 machine gun
- Bombs: 1 × 825 kg (1,819 lb) torpedo

== Bibliography ==
- Owers, Colin A. (2015). Hansa-Brandenburg Aircraft of WWI: Volume 2–Biplane Seaplanes. Great War Aviation Centennial Series. Vol. 18. n.p.: Aeronaut Books. ISBN 978-1-935881-32-2.
- Schmeelke, Michael (2020). "Torpedo Los!": The German Imperial Torpedo-Flieger. n.p.: Aeronaut Books. ISBN 978-1-953201-17-1.
