= Hansa-Brandenburg W.11 =

W.11
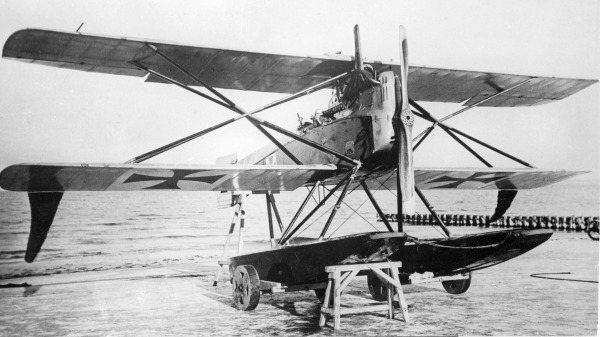
- A W.11 on its beaching trolley; the objects hanging down from the lower wings are identification pennants

General information
- Type: Fighter seaplane
- National origin: Germany
- Manufacturer: Hansa-Brandenburg
- Number built: 3

History
- First flight: 1917
- Developed from: Hansa-Brandenburg KDW

The Hansa-Brandenburg W.11 was a prototype floatplane fighter designed by the Hansa-Brandenburg Aircraft Company (Hansa Brandenburgische Flugzeugwerke) for the Imperial German Navy's (Kaiserliche Marine) Naval Air Service (Marine-Fliegerabteilung) during World War I. It was a slightly enlarged version of the KDW fitted with a more powerful engine. Only three examples were built during 1916 and no production order followed. Their activities are not known with any detail, but one survived to the end of the war and was probably scrapped afterward.

== Design and development ==
The W.11 followed same configuration as the KDW, including the star-shaped interplane struts connecting the upper and lower wings, but was slightly larger. The latter's water-cooled 150-metric-horsepower (110 kW) Benz Bz.III straight-six engine was replaced by a 200 PS (147 kW) Benz Bz.IV straight-six engine that also drove a two-bladed fixed-pitch propeller. The aircraft retained the KDW's armament of two fixed, forward-firing 7.92-millimeter (0.312 in) LMG 08/15 machine guns.

== Specifications ==
Data from Hansa-Brandenburg Aircraft of WWI: Volume 2–Biplane Seaplanes. A Centennial Perspective on Great War Airplanes

General characteristics

- Crew: 1
- Length: 8.1 m (26 ft 7 in)
- Wingspan: 10.10 m (33 ft 2 in)
- Height: 3.5 m (11 ft 6 in)
- Wing area: 31.43 m^{2} (338.3 sq ft)
- Empty weight: 935 kg (2,061 lb)
- Gross weight: 1,233 kg (2,718 lb)
- Powerplant: 1 × Benz Bz.IV water-cooled straight-six piston engine, 160 kW (220 hp)
- Propellers: 2-bladed fixed-pitch

Performance

- Maximum speed: 176 km/h (109 mph, 95 kn)
- Time to altitude: 4 minutes to 1,000 m (3,300 ft)
- 6.5 minutes to 1,500 m (4,900 ft)
- 9 minutes to 2,000 m (6,600 ft)
- 16.6 minutes to 3,000 m (9,800 ft)

Armament

- 2 × fixed, forward-firing 7.92 mm (.312 in) LMG 08/15 machine guns

== Bibliography ==
- Andersson, Lennart & Sanger, Ray (2014). Retribution and Recovery: German Aircraft and Aviation 1919 to 1922. Air-Britain (Historians). ISBN 978-0-85130-467-0.
- Gray, Peter & Thetford, Owen (1987) [1970]. German Aircraft of the First World War (2nd ed.). Putnam. ISBN 0-85177-809-7.
- Green, William & Swanborough, Gordon (2001) [1994]. The Complete Book of Fighters: An Illustrated Encyclopedia of Every Fighter Built and Flown (Revised and Updated ed.). Salamander Books. ISBN 1-84065-269-1.
- Herris, Jack (2012). German Seaplane Fighters of WWI: A Centennial Perspective on Great War Seaplanes. Great War Aviation Centennial Series. Vol. 2. Aeronaut Books. ISBN 978-1-935881-09-4.
- Owers, Colin A. (2015). Hansa-Brandenburg Aircraft of WWI: Volume 2–Biplane Seaplanes. Great War Aviation Centennial Series. Vol. 18. Aeronaut Books. ISBN 978-1-935881-32-2.
- Schmeelke, Michael (2018). Zeebrugge: Naval Air Station Flanders I 1914–1918. Aeronaut Books. ISBN 978-1-935881-46-9.
