= W23 =

W23 may refer to:

- W23 (nuclear artillery shell)
- Bayungu language
- British NVC community W23, a scrub community in the British National Vegetation Classification system
- Compound of five octahedra
- Hansa-Brandenburg W.23, a German flying boat fighter
- Wanderer W23, a vehicle manufactured by Wanderer
- Wild Rose Idlewild Airport, in Waushara County, Wisconsin, United States
- Samsung Galaxy W23, a Mobile Smartphone developed by Samsung Electronics
