= Hansa-Brandenburg W.18 =

WWI German flying boat

W.18
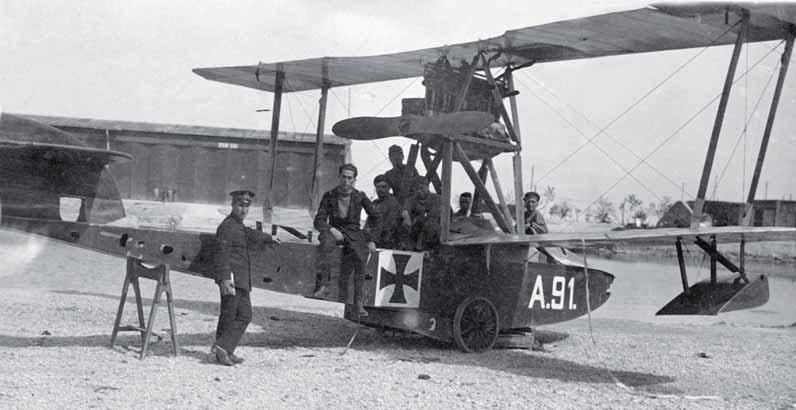
- Umberto Calvello with personnel of 261st Squadron next to the wreckage of A91 shot down and captured on 4 May 1918

General information
- Type: Fighter flying boat
- Manufacturer: Hansa und Brandenburgische Flugzeug-Werke; Phönix Flugzeug-Werke
- Primary user: Austro-Hungarian Naval Aviation

History
- Manufactured: 108
- First flight: 1917
- Developed from: Hansa-Brandenburg CC

The Hansa-Brandenburg W.18 was a single-seat biplane fighter flying boat designed by the Hansa-Brandenburg Aircraft Company (Hansa Brandenburgische Flugzeugwerke) for the Imperial German Navy's (Kaiserliche Marine) Naval Air Service (Marine-Fliegerabteilung) and the Austro-Hungarian Navy's (German: Kaiserlich und königlich Kriegsmarine) Naval Aviation (German: Kaiserlich und königlich Seefliegerkorps) during the First World War. It was developed from the Hansa-Brandenburg CC in 1916.

The prototype was delivered to the Naval Air Service with the majority purchased by Austro-Hungarian Naval Aviation. Hansa-Brandenburg built 47 for them and also sold a license to Phönix Flugzeug-Werke to build an additional 60.

== Development and design ==
The pusher configuration W.18 was derived from the earlier CC fighter and shared that aircraft's single-bay wings, swept lower wing, wing floats, and a single-step hull to allow the aircraft to break free from the water more easily. It replaced the latter's star-shaped interplane struts with two vertical struts on each side. The aircraft built for the Naval Air Service retained the CC's water-cooled 150-metric-horsepower (110 kW) Benz Bz.III straight-six engine that was mounted on struts between the wings. The armament consisted of two fixed, forward-firing 7.92-millimeter (0.312 in) LMG 08/15 machine guns.

Forty-seven aircraft were ordered by Naval Aviation on 14 December 1916, modified to suit Austro-Hungarian preferences. The fuselage was lengthened to improve stability and minor changes were made to the tail structure, wings and the LMG 08/15 machine guns were exchanged for 8-millimeter (0.31 in) Schwarzlose M-16 machine guns. The Benz engine was replaced by a water-cooled 200–230-metric-horsepower (147–169 kW) Hiero 6 straight-six engine with the radiator embedded in the upper wing. The aircraft license-built by Phönix were further modified and only had a single Schwarzlose machine gun.

The prototype was delivered to the Naval Air Service's Seaplane Experimental Command (Seeflugzeug-Versuchs-Kommando) in December 1917, but was received with little interest by the Germans. Deliveries of all 47 aircraft were completed by February 1918, although the last 9 were delivered without engines.

== Operational history ==
Austro-Hungary received 47 W.18s, using them to provide air-defence for ports and naval bases along the Adriatic Sea coast.

== Variants ==
- Prototype: 1 built, Benz Bz.III engine, LMG 08/15 machine guns
- W.18: 47 built, Hiero 6 engine, M-16 machine guns
- Phönix-built W.18: 60 built, one M-16 machine gun

== Operators ==
Austria-Hungary

- German: Kaiserliche und Königliche Kriegsmarine

German Empire

- German: Kaiserliche Marine

== Specifications (W.18 - Hiero engine) ==
Data from Hansa-Brandenburg Aircraft of WWI: Volume 2–Biplane Seaplanes

General characteristics

- Crew: 1
- Length: 8.15 m (26 ft 9 in)
- Upper wingspan: 10.7 m (35 ft 1 in)
- Lower wingspan: 10.3 m (33 ft 10 in)
- Height: 3.45 m (11 ft 4 in)
- Wing area: 34.38 m^{2} (370.1 sq ft)
- Empty weight: 812 kg (1,790 lb)
- Gross weight: 1,092 kg (2,407 lb)
- Powerplant: 1 × Hiero 6 water-cooled straight-six engine, 150–170 kW (200–230 hp)
- Propellers: 2-bladed wooden fixed pitch propeller

Performance

- Maximum speed: 180 km/h (110 mph, 97 kn)
- Range: 400 km (250 mi, 220 nmi)
- Time to altitude: 1,000 m (3,300 ft) in 5 minutes; 3,000 m (9,800 ft) in 23.4 minutes

Armament

- Guns: 2 × 8 mm (0.315 in) Schwarzlose M-16 machine guns

== See also ==
Related lists

- List of military aircraft of Germany
- List of flying boats and floatplanes

== Bibliography ==
- Gray, Peter & Thetford, Owen (1987) [1970]. German Aircraft of the First World War (2nd ed.). Putnam. ISBN 0-85177-809-7.
- Green, William & Swanborough, Gordon (2001) [1994]. The Complete Book of Fighters: An Illustrated Encyclopedia of Every Fighter Built and Flown (Revised and Updated ed.). Salamander Books. ISBN 1-84065-269-1.
- Owers, Colin A. (2015). Hansa-Brandenburg Aircraft of WWI: Volume 2–Biplane Seaplanes. Great War Aviation Centennial Series. Vol. 18. Aeronaut Books. ISBN 978-1-935881-32-2.
