= Hansa-Brandenburg GW =

German Floatplane Torpedo Bomber

GW
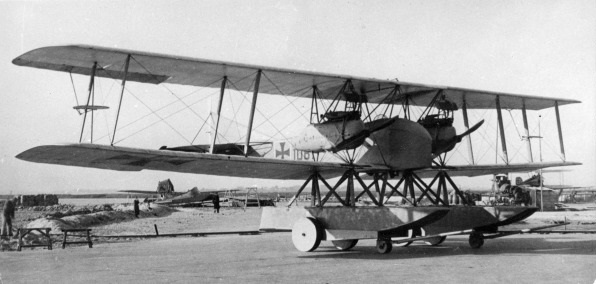
- Forward oblique view of a late-production GW on its beaching trolley

General information
- Type: Torpedo bomber
- National origin: Germany
- Manufacturer: Hansa-Brandenburg
- Designer: Ernst Heinkel
- Primary user: Imperial German Navy
- Number built: 21

History
- First flight: 1916

The Hansa-Brandenburg GW was a floatplane torpedo bomber designed by the Hansa-Brandenburg Aircraft Company (Hansa Brandenburgische Flugzeugwerke) for the Imperial German Navy's (Kaiserliche Marine) Naval Air Service (Marine-Fliegerabteilung) during World War I. One prototype was built in 1916 and was followed by twenty production aircraft.

== Design and development ==
After the submarine SM U-9 sank three British armored cruisers on 22 September 1914 shortly after the war began, the German Imperial Naval Office (Reichsmarine-Amt) decided to try mounting torpedoes on aircraft as they were far easier and faster to build than submarines. Early trials with land-based aircraft were unsuccessful because of the great weight of the torpedo (645 kilograms (1,422 lb)) was more than existing aircraft could easily lift and the danger of trying to fly from an uneven grass airstrip with such a large weight of explosives. At the beginning of 1915 the Naval Office ordered the development of seaplanes capable of carrying torpedoes and the Seaplane Experimental Command (Seeflugzeug-Versuchs-Kommando (SVK)) issued requirements for these aircraft. They had to be twin-engine airplanes armed with a machine gun for self-defense and with a crew of two or three men: a pilot and observer for torpedo missions and a pilot, bombardier and gunner for bombing missions.

Ernst Heinkel, chief designer of Hansa-Brandenburg, stated that the GW was based on the twin-engined GF series of bomber designs that led to the land-based G.I bomber, but the GW was substantially larger and heavier. Like the G.I, it was a conventional three-bay biplane design with equal-span wings. The undercarriage consisted of two widely spaced floats to allow for the torpedo to be carried between them. The floats were attached to the fuselage and wings by multiple V-struts. The two 160-metric-horsepower (118 kW) Mercedes D.III straight-six engines were positioned between the wings, supported by pairs of V-struts, driving two-bladed propellers.

Improvements were continually made in the GW's design during its time in production. The prototype had a long nose fitted with a cockpit for the unarmed observer, forward of the pilot's cockpit, and it had three rudders at its tail, positioned above the horizontal stabilisers. Its radiators were mounted on the struts above the engines. The first batch of production aircraft received a 7.92-millimeter (0.312 in) Parabellum MG14 machine gun on a flexible mount for the observer, the shape of the tailplane was modified and the radiators were embedded in the upper wing. Some of the second batch only had a single balanced rudder that extended above and below the fuselage. All of the aircraft in the third batch had the single rudder and the observer's cockpit was moved behind the pilot while those of the fourth batch received balanced elevators.

== Operational history ==
The first batch of five GWs were delivered to the SVK in January 1916 and they began to be transferred to the torpedo training unit in Kiel-Holtenau, informally known as Sonder-Kommando Edler, the following month. Aircraft from the second batch of five aircraft began arriving at the training unit beginning in April. In June a small squadron (I. Front-Staffel) of four GWs was declared operational and ready for deployment to the Eastern Front.

== Specifications ==
Data from Hansa-Brandenburg Aircraft of WWI: Volume 2–Biplane Seaplanes

General characteristics

- Crew: 2
- Length: 11.9 m (39 ft 1 in)
- Wingspan: 21.56 m (70 ft 9 in)
- Wing area: 103.4 m^{2} (1,113 sq ft)
- Empty weight: 2,374 kg (5,234 lb)
- Gross weight: 3,856 kg (8,501 lb)
- Powerplant: 2 × Mercedes D.III water-cooled straight-six engines, 120 kW (160 hp) Originally measured as 160 PS each
- Propellers: 2-bladed fixed-pitch

Performance

- Maximum speed: 127 km/h (79 mph, 69 kn)
- Time to altitude: 11.7 minutes to 500 m (1,600 ft)
- 20.8 minutes to 800 m (2,600 ft)
- 29.4 minutes to 1,000 m (3,300 ft)

Armament

- Guns: 1 × 7.92 mm (0.312 in) Parabellum MG14 machine gun
- Bombs: 1 × 726 kg (1,601 lb) torpedo

== Bibliography ==
- Owers, Colin A. (2015). Hansa-Brandenburg Aircraft of WWI: Volume 2–Biplane Seaplanes. Great War Aviation Centennial Series. Vol. 18. Aeronaut Books. ISBN 978-1-935881-32-2.
- Schmeelke, Michael (2020). "Torpedo Los!": The German Imperial Torpedo-Flieger. Aeronaut Books. ISBN 978-1-953201-17-1.
