= Palais Miller von Aichholz =

Palace in Vienna, Austria

Coordinates: 48°11′39″N 16°22′39″E

Palais Miller von Aichholz was a city-palace (Palais) in Vienna, Austria. It was constructed for the noble Miller von Aichholz family and later bought by the Jewish aristocrat Camillo Castiglioni. Therefore, the building was later known as Palais Castiglioni.

The owner was forced to flee after the Anschluss of Austria to Nazi Germany in 1938 and became property of the city of Vienna. It was subsequently demolished in 1961.
