= Hansa-Brandenburg G.I =

Austro-Hungarian Bomber Aircraft

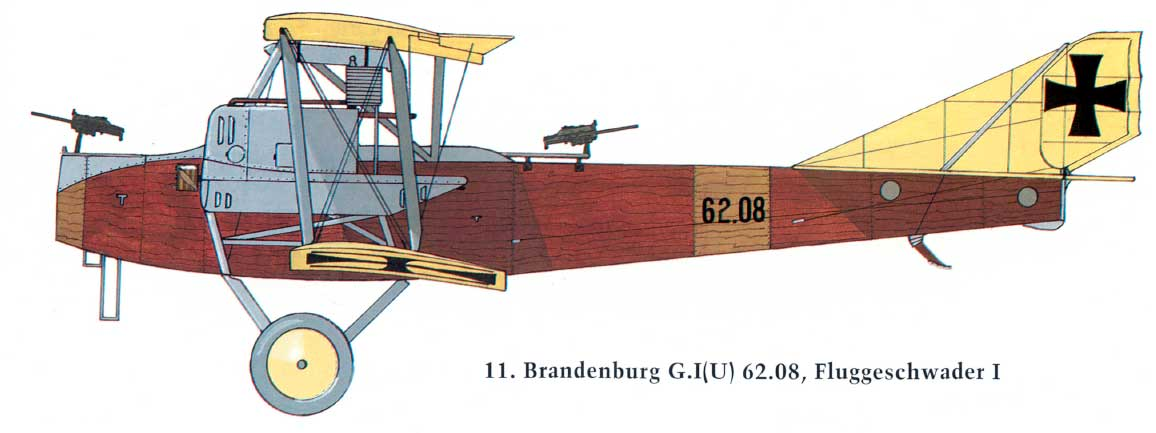

General information
- Type: Bomber
- Manufacturer: Hansa-Brandenburg, UFAG
- Designer: Ernst Heinkel
- Primary user: KuKLFT
- Number built: ca. 50

History
- Manufactured: 1917 to 1918
- Introduction date: 1917
- First flight: early 1916

The Hansa-Brandenburg G.I was a bomber aircraft used to equip the Austro-Hungarian aviation corps in World War I. It was a mostly conventional large, three-bay biplane with staggered wings of slightly unequal span. The pilot and bombardier sat in a large open cockpit at the nose of the aircraft, with a second open cockpit for a gunner in a dorsal position behind the wings. An unusual feature was the placement of the twin tractor engines. While the normal practice of the day was to mount these to the wings, either directly or on struts, the G.I had the engines mounted to the sides of the fuselage on lattices of steel struts. This arrangement added considerable weight to the aircraft and transmitted a lot of vibration to the airframe.

A small initial production batch of six aircraft was delivered by March 1917, but were all grounded soon thereafter and put into storage due to a contractual dispute between the manufacturer and Flars (the Imperial and Royal Aviation Arsenal). When this was resolved, deliveries recommenced, although the size of the order was reduced, and the bombers were modified by Flars before being sent to the Divača airfield, on the Italian Front. Twelve aircraft were built by UFAG and differed slightly from the German-built machines.

The G.I eventually equipped three squadrons plus a replacement unit, but reports from pilots were unfavourable, especially in comparison to the Gotha G.IV that was becoming available. The Hansa-Brandenburg machine was therefore quickly relegated to training duties. In the three months that these aircraft had been at the front, they had only carried out a single successful sortie. As a footnote to the G.I's military service, the type also served as a testbed in experiments in mounting large-caliber cannon on aircraft; flying with nose-mounted 50 mm (2 in) and (separately) 70 mm (2.75 in) Skoda weapons, and a 37 mm (1.46 in) Skoda cannon mounted in the dorsal gunner's position.

== Operators ==
Austria-Hungary

- Kaiserliche und Königliche Luftfahrtruppen
  - Flik 101/G
  - Flik 102/G
  - Flik 103/G
  - Flek 22

== Specifications ==
General characteristics

- Crew: Three - pilot, bombardier, and gunner
- Length: 9.80 m (32 ft 2 in)
- Wingspan: 18.00 m (59 ft 1 in)
- Wing area: 70.0 m^{2} (753 sq ft)
- Empty weight: 1,776 kg (3,915 lb)
- Gross weight: 2,740 kg (6,040 lb)
- Powerplant: 2 × Austro-Daimler 6 cyl. water-cooled inline piston engine , 120 kW (160 hp) each

Performance

- Maximum speed: 133 km/h (82 mph, 71 kn)
- Rate of climb: 1.7 m/s (330 ft/min)

Armament

- 2 × 8 mm (.315 in) Schwarzlose machine guns
- Bombs
