= Basse und Selve =

Basse und Selve GmbH
- Industry: Transport
- Founded: 1908
- Founder: Gustav Selve
- Defunct: 1934
- Headquarters: Altena, Germany
- Products: Vehicle and aircraft engines
- Owner: Gustav Selve, succeeded by Dr. Walther von Selve

Basse und Selve (BuS) was a German manufacturer of engines for automobiles, motorcycles, boats, aircraft and railcars, supplying engines for Selve cars built at the Selve Automobilwerke AG, but also various other manufacturers of automobiles and commercial vehicles, such as Beckmann, Mannesmann, and Heim. The Altena factory was founded in 1908 by Gustav Selve, employing 2,000 workers, with Dr. Walther von Selve taking over the firm on the death of Gustav Selve, his father.

Basse und Selve aero-engines did not make a big impact on the aviation industry in Germany, but did find limited use, particularly in several large aircraft. The largest and most powerful fighter fitted with a Basse & Selve engine was the Hansa-Brandenburg W.34, a single prototype of which was completed before hostilities ceased in 1918. Several large Riesenflugzeuge were also fitted with Basse & Selve engines, but they were generally replaced with Mercedes or Maybach alternatives as soon as possible.

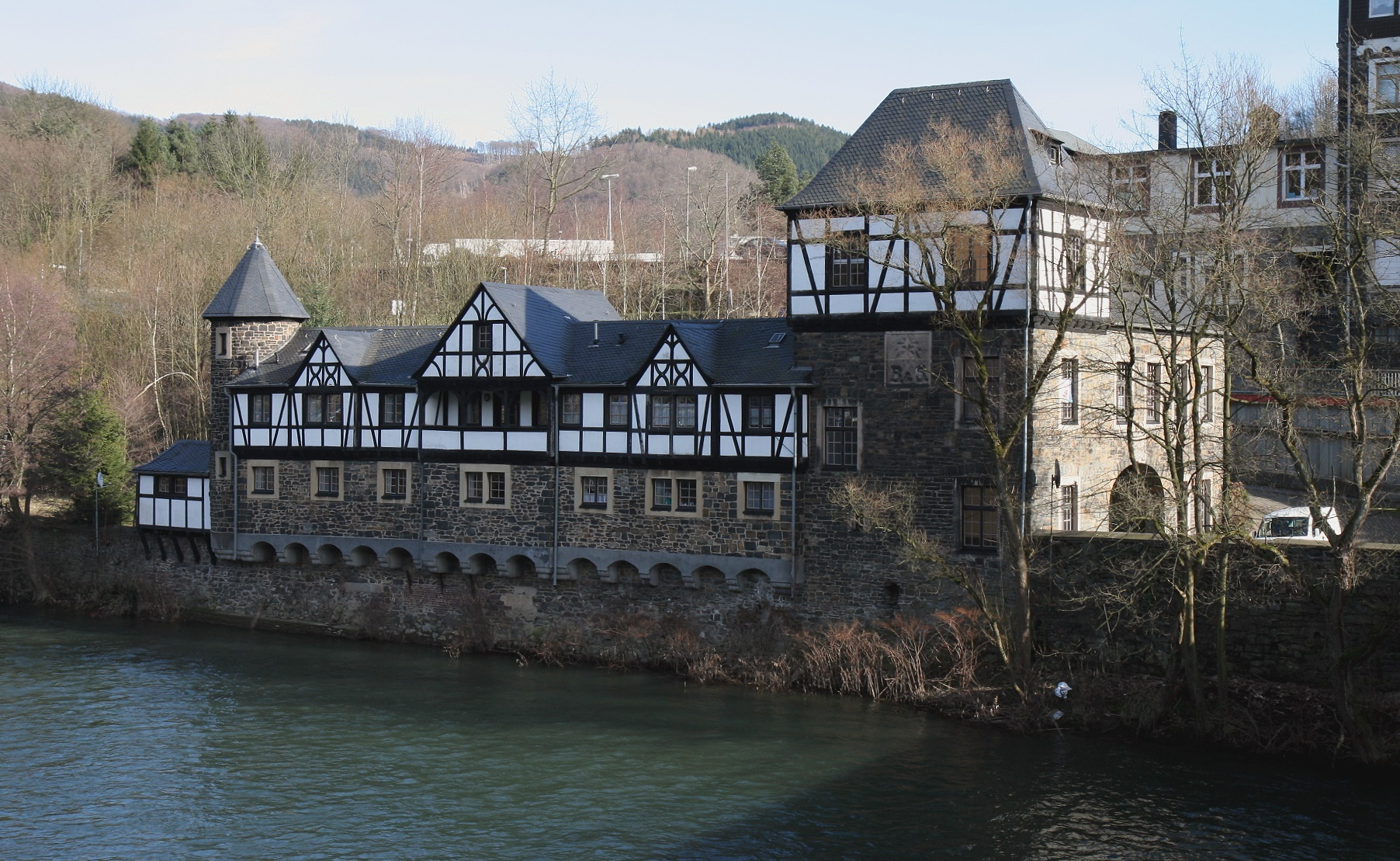
The former Basse & Selve factory in Altena

Basse & Selve continued to build engines until closing its doors in 1932, two years before the closure of its sister company, Selve Automobilwerke AG, which closed in 1934.

== Aero-engines ==
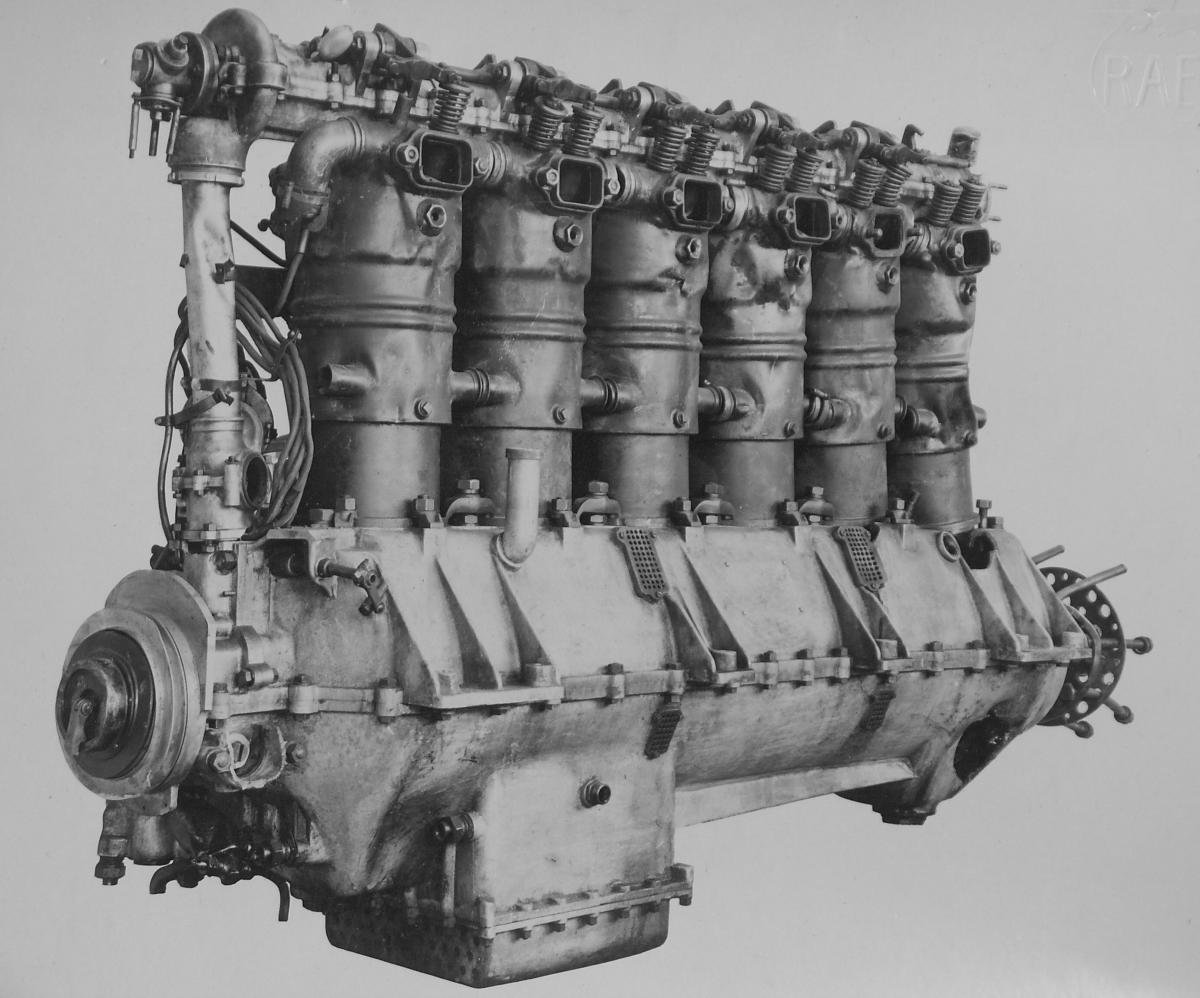
BuS.IV aircraft engine (heavily damaged)

Basse und Selve is known to have produced the following engines for aircraft and/or airships:

- BuS.III
- BuS.IV
- BuS.IVa

== Applications ==
Hansa-Brandenburg W.34
BuS.IVa
AGO S.I
1 x 150 hp BuS.III (1918)
Rumpler C.I
1 x 260 hp BuS.IV (1918)
Siemens-Schuckert R.VIII
6 x 300 hp BuS.IVa (1918)
Rumpler C.IV
1 x BuS.IVa
Zeppelin-Staaken R.VI
4 x 300 hp BuS.IVa, R.52/16 only, later replaced by four 245hp Maybach Mb.IVa engines

== See also ==
- List of aircraft engine manufacturers
- Gustav Selve
- Selve Automobilwerke AG, German car manufacturer
- Selve, Swiss metal company located in Thun in Switzerland.
