= Hansa-Brandenburg CC =

Flying boat

CC
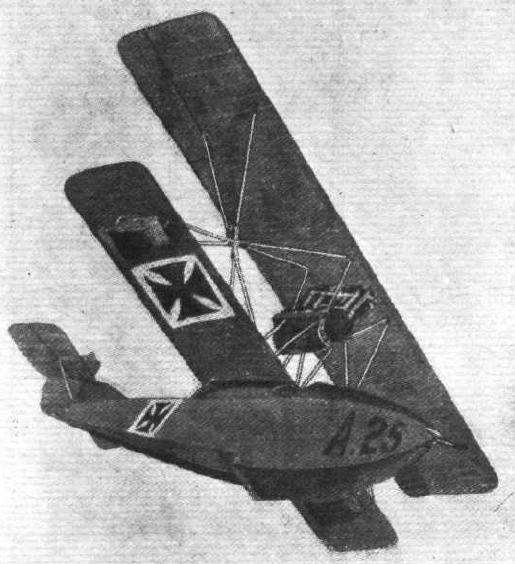

General information
- Type: Fighter flying boat
- Manufacturer: Hansa und Brandenburgische Flugzeug-Werke
- Primary users: Austria-Hungary German Empire

History
- Manufactured: 73
- First flight: 1916

The Hansa-Brandenburg CC was a single-seat German fighter flying boat of World War I. It was used by both the Kaiserliche Marine (Imperial German Navy) and the Austro-Hungarian Navy.

== Development and design ==
The Hansa-Brandenburg CC (where the designation CC came from the initials of the financier of the Hansa Brandenburg works, Camillo Castiglioni) was designed by Ernst Heinkel during 1916 for use by the Austro-Hungarian Navy. It was a single engined, single seater flying boat, with a pusher engine mounted between the wings. It had single-bay wings, with the unusual "Star-Strutter" arrangement of bracing struts (where four Vee struts joined in the centre of the wing bay to result in a "star" arrangement) shared with the Hansa-Brandenburg D.I and the KDW.

The CC was purchased both by Austro-Hungary and the Imperial German Navy. The Austro-Hungarian aircraft were powered by 119 kW (160 hp) Austro-Daimler or 130 kW (180 hp) Hiero engines and armed by a single 8 mm (.315 in) Schwarzlose machine gun. The German aircraft were powered by 110 kW (150 hp) Benz Bz.III engines and armed with one or two lMG 08/15 machine guns.

One example was modified as a triplane, while a second aircraft was modified with sponsons replacing the outrigger floats in support of the development process for the Zeppelin-Lindau (Dornier) Rs.IV.

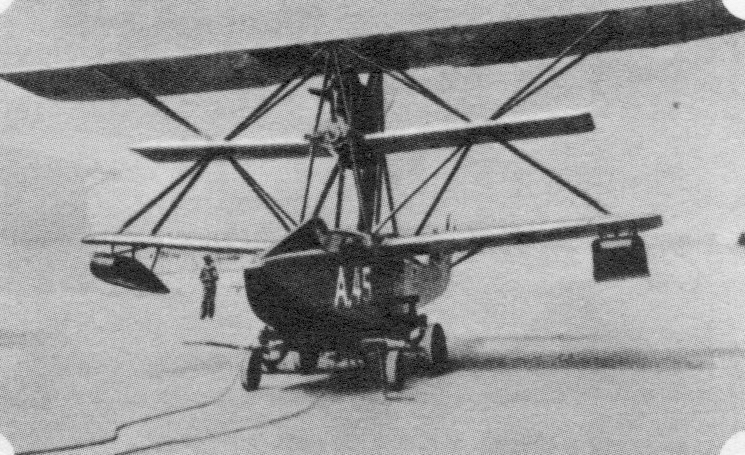
Triplane variant, serial A.62

=== Triplane variant ===
The triplane configuration was created from the standard model by inserting a third, short-span wing between the upper and lower planes of, at the point where the star struts crossed. Delivered to Austro-Hungary in the Spring of 1917, the sole example was written off that autumn following a landing accident.

== Operational history ==
Austro-Hungary received 37 Hansa Brandenburg CCs, using them to provide air defence for ports and naval bases along the Adriatic Sea coast.

Germany received 36 aircraft from February 1917. They were temporarily grounded in July of that year because of severe vibration, being modified with additional interplane bracing struts.

== Operators ==
Austria-Hungary

- Kaiserliche und Königliche Kriegsmarine

German Empire

- Kaiserliche Marine

== Specifications (CC Kaiserliche Marine) ==

Data from The Complete Book of Fighters

General characteristics

- Crew: 1
- Length: 7.69 m (25 ft 3 in)
- Wingspan: 9.3 m (30 ft 6 in)
- Lower wingspan: 7.38 m (24 ft 3 in)
- Height: 3.57 m (11 ft 9 in)
- Wing area: 26.5 m^{2} (285 sq ft)
- Empty weight: 800 kg (1,764 lb)
- Gross weight: 1,080 kg (2,381 lb)
- Powerplant: 1 × Benz Bz.III 6-cyl. water-cooled in-line piston engine, 110 kW (150 hp)
- Propellers: 2-bladed wooden fixed pitch propeller

Performance

- Maximum speed: 175 km/h (109 mph, 94 kn)
- Range: 500 km (310 mi, 270 nmi)
- Time to altitude: 1,000 m (3,300 ft): 4.8 min
- Wing loading: 40.8 kg/m^{2} (8.4 lb/sq ft)
- Power/mass: 0.10 kW/kg (0.063 hp/lb)

Armament
1 or 2 × 7.92 mm (0.312 in) LMG 08/15 machine guns

== See also ==
Related lists

- List of military aircraft of Germany
- List of flying boats and floatplanes

== Bibliography ==
- Gray, Peter; Thetford, Owen (1970). German Aircraft of the First World War (2nd ed.). London: Putnam. pp. 311–312. ISBN 978-0-370-00103-6.
- Green, William and Swanborough, Gordon. The Complete Book of Fighters. New York: Smithmark, 1994. ISBN 0-8317-3939-8.
- Haddow, George (July–August 2007). "George Haddow's guide to WW1 Austro-Hungarian Aeroplanes No.9, Hansa-Brandenburg Type CC". Windsock Worldwide. 23 (4). Albatros Productions: 6–15.
- "FROM OTHER LANDS. AUSTRIAN AGO AND LOHNER FLYING BOATS". Flight: 67–69. 17 January 1918.
- Owers, Colin A. (2015). Hansa-Brandenburg Aircraft of WWI: Volume 2–Biplane Seaplanes. Great War Aviation Centennial Series. Vol. 18. Aeronaut Books. ISBN 978-1-935881-32-2.
