= Hansa-Brandenburg W.34 =

WWI German aircraft

W.34

General information
- Type: Reconnaissance seaplane
- Manufacturer: Hansa und Brandenburgische Flugzeugwerke
- Primary users: German Imperial Navy (intended) Finnish Navy
- Number built: 3

Hansa-Brandenburg W.34 was a prototype German two-seat, single-engined floatplane, which had been designed by Hansa und Brandenburgische Flugzeugwerke during World War I.

== Development ==
The W.34 was similar in design to the W.33, but was powered by a Basse und Selve BuS.IVa six-cylinder water-cooled engine. The first prototype flew in 1918, shortly before the Armistice. The other two prototypes were operated by the Finnish Navy following the Versailles Treaty and used for coastal defence, being re-engined with Fiat A.12bis engines.

== Specifications (W.34) ==
General characteristics

- Crew: 2
- Length: 11.1 m (36 ft 5 in)
- Wingspan: 16.6 m (54 ft 6 in)
- Height: 3.37 m (11 ft 1 in)
- Wing area: 49 m^{2} (530 sq ft)
- Empty weight: 1,534 kg (3,382 lb)
- Gross weight: 2,270 kg (5,004 lb)
- Powerplant: 1 × Basse und Selve BuS.IVa 6-cylinder water-cooled in-line piston engine, 220 kW (300 hp)

Performance

- Maximum speed: 180 km/h (110 mph, 97 kn)
- Cruise speed: 160 km/h (99 mph, 86 kn)

Armament

- Guns:
  - 2 × fixed, forward firing, synchronised 7.92 mm (0.312 in) LMG 08/15 Spandau machines guns
  - 2 × 7.92 mm LMG 14/17 Parabellum machine-guns on a flexible mount in the rear cockpit

== See also ==
Related lists

- List of military aircraft of Germany

== Bibliography ==
- Grosz, Peter M. (1996). Brandenburg W 29. Windsock Datafile. Vol. 55. Barkhamsted, UK: Albatros Publications. ISBN 0-948414-74-X.
- Herris, Jack (2012). German Seaplane Fighters of WWI: A Centennial Perspective on Great War Seaplanes. Great War Aviation Centennial Series. Vol. 2. Aeronaut Books. ISBN 978-1-935881-51-3.
- Owers, Colin A. (2015). Hansa-Brandenburg Aircraft of WWI: Volume 3–Monoplane Seaplanes. Great War Aviation Centennial Series. Vol. 19. n.p.: Aeronaut Books. ISBN 978-1-935881-33-9.
