= Camillo Castiglioni =

Italian-Austrian financier

- Born: 22 October 1879; Trieste, Austria-Hungary
- Died: 18 December 1957 (aged 78); Rome, Italy
- Education: Business and tax law
- Occupations: Financier; industrialist
- Known for: Critical contributions to BMW AG in its early years; wealthiest man in Central Europe; owned over 170 companies; passionate about aviation and the arts

Camillo Castiglioni (22 October 1879 – 18 December 1957) was an Italian-Austrian financier and banker, and was the wealthiest man in Central Europe during World War I. Nicknamed "Austrian Stinnes", he was active in aviation's pioneering days and invested in the arts. Castiglioni was credited as being instrumental to the founding of what would eventually become BMW AG.

== Early life ==
Castiglioni was born in Trieste, then part of Austria-Hungary, to the chief rabbi. His older brother was Arturo Castiglioni. It is not known when Camillo developed his interest in aviation, but it is known that he was passionate about flying. Camillo's education was primarily law, gaining employment as an attorney and legal officer of a bank in Padua, quickly learning international finance and how to manage capital.

He was the son of a rubber maker, so naturally Camillo found work with the Austro-American Gummiwarenfabrik AG (rubber products) in Vienna as an agent for the Kaufmann automobile tire division in Constantinople. Camillo found great success in this position, demonstrating his abilities to negotiate and structure financial deals. In fact, Camillo was so successful, he was promoted to director of the export department of the parent company in Vienna.

Around 1901, along with Viktor Silberer and Franz Hinterstoissera Camillo helped to create the Viennese aero club (later Austrian aero club). He eventually was made deputy director, then in 1904 he was appointed to general director of the company. Through his experience in the rubber and tire production field, Camillo saw the birth of aviation as an industry, going from a ballooning hobby, to makeshift glider craft requiring tires, to fully operational aircraft operated by engines. He met many influential men in his business, and came to realize that aviation sparked not only his passion for flight, but also recognized the tremendous financial opportunity of aviation's potential as an industry.

In order to draw from the arising enthusiasm for airplanes and ballooning, as well as to take advantage of the lucrative business the hobby generated, Camillo established one of his first companies, Luftfahrzeug-Gesellschaft, in 1907. Being a pure commercial firm – it acquired the Etrich balloon patents and sold balloon fliers in Austria Hungary. There were many contests that these inspired balloon drivers entered, and Camillo was no different- he bought his own balloon and successfully took his balloon driver examination on 24 August 1909.

== Aviation financing ==
During the First World War, he became one of the richest and most influential financiers in Central Europe.

The first major investor in the series production of aircraft. In 1914, he purchased the German aircraft company Hansa- und Brandenburgische Flugzeugwerke, which employed Ernst Heinkel as its chief designer. Acquired a majority holding in Austro-Daimler with its chief designers Puch and Porsche. Press "czar" and sponsor of the arts (financed Max Reinhardt and helped him to organize the Salzburg Festival). After a series of setbacks, his financial empire broke up in 1926. He retired to Switzerland, then to Milan where he set up a private bank and once again amassed a considerable fortune. After the Second World War, negotiated a large US loan for his friend Josip Broz Tito in Yugoslavia. When Tito refused to pay his commission, Castiglioni succeeded in getting Yugoslavian assets in Italy worth millions sequestered. In 1916, he was awarded the Franz Joseph Order with ribbon on the Military Service Cross for his services to aviation and in 1918 with the St-Georges Order for his achievements in the war material production.

Castiglioni became rich in ventures during the period of inflation, acquiring a majority interest in Alpine Montan AG. The Austrian aviation company Österreichische Luftfahrtsgesellschaft was founded by him.

== BMW influence ==
Castiglioni significantly influenced the development of BMW AG in its early years. The granting of a license agreement by Austro-Daimler to the Rapp-Werke in 1917 was partly attributable to Castiglioni. 1918 At Castiglioni's insistence the Wiener Bankverein acquired the majority of BMW's share capital. 1922 Castiglioni purchased all the equipment relating to engine construction, the associated know-how and the rights to the name "Bayerische Motoren Werke AG" from the BMW AG, which was renamed Süddeutsche Bremse AG. Castiglioni in turn renamed the Bayerische Flugzeugwerke to BMW AG and allowed the renamed company to continue production at the BFW plant. From the establishment of BMW AG until November 9, 1922 and then from 1924 to 1929, he was a member of the Supervisory Board and President of BMW AG. 1928 Deputy Chairman of the Supervisory Board.

His was one of the voices that urged BMW in 1928 to purchase the Eisenach Automobilwerke. Due to financial difficulties in 1929 he was obliged to surrender his holding of BMW shares to a consortium of banks (Deutsche Bank, Disconto, Bankhaus Hagen etc.).

A consortium led by the Deutsche Bank and the Diskonto-Gesellschaft purchased the BMW shares previously held by Camillo Castiglioni, who was facing problems of liquidity.

== Failed speculation and bankruptcy ==
In February 1924, Castiglioni partnered with Fritz Mannheimer, and later other influential bankers to speculate on the devaluation of the French franc. They shorted hundreds of millions of franc, eventually causing the franc to drop almost 40% in less than a month. By the beginning of March 1924, one United States dollar was worth 28 francs. Then, however, investment bank Lazard, on the behalf of Banque de France and powered by J.P. Morgan & Co., bought immense amounts of francs, causing the franc to rise again, to 15 franc per dollar. Castiglioni, Mannheimer and their partners lost millions.

In September 1924, the Austrian Depositenbank, of which Castiglioni had been president, collapsed. A warrant for his arrest on a charge of fraud was issued, but Castiglioni had taken care to be in Italy when the crash came. The Austrian State said that if he deposited $4,200,000 ($78,902,913 in present-day value), he could return unmolested.

== Philanthropy ==
Castiglioni built up a large art collection and a theatre in Vienna. He was the richest man in Central Europe and much beloved by the Viennese whom he assisted financially on Sundays and odd occasions. He was also a patron of the arts and for some time supported the famed producer Max Reinhardt, for whom he built a theater. So fond was he of appearing in the public limelight that he lived with all the pomp and ceremony of royalty, even traveling in the Kaiser Karl's private parlor car, which he bought.

Because of his famous banking activities, his life was documented in a 1988 movie on television titled Camillo Castiglioni oder die Moral der Haifische (in English: Camillo Castiglioni, or the morality of sharks), directed by Peter Patzak.

== See also ==
- Fritz Mannheimer
- History of BMW
- Palais Miller von Aichholz
