= Hansa-Brandenburg =

Defunct German aircraft manufacturer

- Industry: Aircraft manufacture
- Founded: 1914
- Defunct: 1919
- Headquarters: Brandenburg an der Havel
- Key people: Camillo Castiglioni; Ernst Heinkel

Hansa und Brandenburgische Flugzeugwerke (more usually just Hansa-Brandenburg) was a German aircraft manufacturing company that operated during World War I. It was created in May 1914 by the purchase of Brandenburgische Flugzeugwerke by Camillo Castiglioni, who relocated the factory from Liebau to Brandenburg an der Havel. Brandenburg's chief designer, Ernst Heinkel was retained by the new enterprise. By Autumn 1915, it had become the largest aircraft manufacturer in Germany, with a capital of 1,500,000 Marks, 1,000 employees, and two more factories - one in Rummelsburg, Berlin, and one in Wandsbek, Hamburg.

Although manufacturing was carried out in Germany, Castiglioni was an Austrian, and many of the firm's military aircraft were produced for the Austro-Hungarian aviation corps. The firm became especially known for a highly successful series of floatplane fighters and reconnaissance aircraft that were used by the Imperial German Navy during the war. Hansa-Brandenburg did not survive in the post-war market, and ceased operations during 1919. A number of the firm's designs continued to be produced in other countries, however, most notably Finland and Norway.

== Aircraft ==
- Hansa-Brandenburg B.I
- Hansa-Brandenburg C.I
- Hansa-Brandenburg CC
- Hansa-Brandenburg D.I
- Hansa-Brandenburg G.I
- Hansa-Brandenburg GW
- Hansa-Brandenburg KDW
- Hansa-Brandenburg W
- Hansa-Brandenburg W.11
- Hansa-Brandenburg W.12
- Hansa-Brandenburg W.13
- Hansa-Brandenburg W.19
- Hansa-Brandenburg W.20
- Hansa-Brandenburg W.27
- Hansa-Brandenburg W.29
- Hansa-Brandenburg W.33
- Hansa-Brandenburg W.34
