= Hansa-Brandenburg KDW =

German WW1 Floatplane

KDW
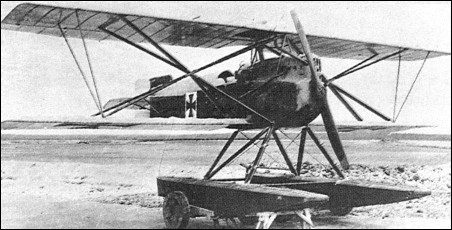

General information
- Type: Floatplane fighter
- National origin: German Empire
- Manufacturer: Hansa und Brandenburgische Flugzeug-Werke
- Designer: Ernst Heinkel
- Primary user: Imperial German Navy
- Number built: 58

History
- Manufactured: 1916–1918
- Introduction date: 1916
- First flight: September 1916
- Developed from: Hansa-Brandenburg D.I

The Hansa-Brandenburg KDW was a German single-engine, single-seat, fighter floatplane of World War I. The KDW – Kampf Doppeldecker, Wasser (Fighter Biplane, Water) – was adapted from the Hansa-Brandenburg D.I landplane to provide coastal defence over the North Sea.

It was produced under licence by the Austro-Hungarian manufacturer Phönix from 1916 in five batches, with progressively more powerful engines and armament, 58 aircraft in total being produced.

== Design and development ==
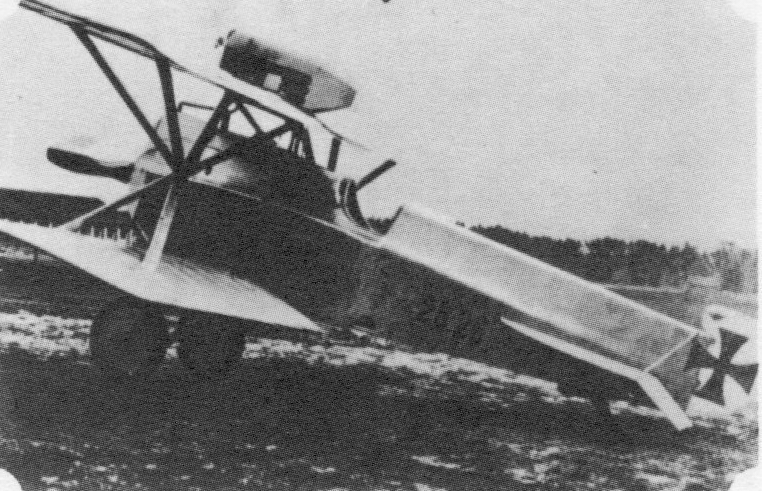
Hansa-Brandenburg D.I, showing the "star strutter" wing bracing

In 1916 the Imperial German Navy ordered the production of single-seat armed scout seaplanes (Jagdeinsitzer Wasser) to defend its North Sea seaplane stations against air attack. To deliver suitable aircraft quickly, the first designs were floatplanes based on existing landplane models. One such was the Hansa-Brandenburg KDW, adapted by the company's chief designer, Ernst Heinkel, from his Hansa-Brandenburg D.I.

The D.I was a single-seat scout with novel and distinctive "star strutter" wing bracing. On each side of the aircraft four vee struts, two facing up, two facing down, were joined by their vertices at a point midway between the upper and lower wings, forming an eight-armed star configuration that gave the plane its nickname Spinne (spider).

The KDW was essentially the D.I with a small increase in wingspan and mounted on a twin-float chassis. To counteract the keel effect resulting from the floats, which were below the aircraft's centre of gravity, vertical tailfin area was added below and later above the fuselage. Even with the added tailfin area, the aircraft's lateral stability – its tendency to return from a bank to vertical flight – was below par. Moreover, the deep fuselage tended to blanket the small tailfin and rudder, making directional stability and control very poor.

== Operational history ==
The KDW was produced in Austria-Hungary under license by Phönix. 58 were built in five production batches. The first batch entered combat in late 1916. The wings extended well beyond the outboard ends of the star struts, and it was found that this unbraced part of the upper wing flexed when the ailerons were actuated, reducing their effectiveness. Starting with the second batch a light steel-tube vee brace was added outboard of the star struts to stiffen the outer upper wing.

The first three batches were equipped with the 150 hp (110 kW) Benz Bz.III engine. The last two batches, 35 aircraft in total, were equipped with the 160 hp (120 kW) Maybach Mb.III engine. The first four batches were armed with one fixed Spandau machine gun, mounted on the starboard side of the nose. The final batch of 20 aircraft, delivered between October 1917 and February 1918, were armed with twin Spandau machine guns on either side of the cockpit.

Production was slow, so that many were obsolete almost as soon as they reached their units. They were difficult to fly because of the aforementioned poor directional stability. Recovery from a spin was a matter of luck. Another reason it was unpopular with pilots was that, until the final batch, the armament was positioned out of their reach, making it impossible to clear stoppages while airborne.

== Operators ==
Germany

- Imperial German Navy

== Specifications (KDW) ==
Data from The Encyclopedia of Military Aircraft

General characteristics

- Crew: 1
- Length: 8 m (26 ft 3 in)
- Wingspan: 9.25 m (30 ft 4 in)
- Height: 3.35 m (11 ft 0 in)
- Gross weight: 1,040 kg (2,293 lb)
- Powerplant: 1 × Benz Bz.III 6-cyl. water-cooled inline piston engine, 112 kW (150 hp)

Performance

- Maximum speed: 172 km/h (107 mph, 93 kn)
- Endurance: 2 hrs 30 mins
- Service ceiling: 4,000 m (13,000 ft)

Armament

- Guns: 1 or 2 × fixed forward-firing 7.92 mm (0.312 in) machine guns

== See also ==
Related lists

- List of military aircraft of Germany
- List of flying boats and floatplanes

== Bibliography ==
- Angelucci, Enzo; Matricardi, Paolo (1977). World Aircraft: Origins-World War I. Maidenhead, UK: Sampson Low.
- Gray, Peter; Thetford, Owen (1970). German Aircraft of the First World War (second ed.). London: Putnam.
- Gleim, Irvin N.; Gleim, Garrett W. (2006). Pilot Handbook (eighth ed.). Gainesville, Florida: Gleim. ISBN 1-58194-448-9.
- Herris, Jack (2012). German Seaplane Fighters of WWI: A Centennial Perspective on Great War Seaplanes. Great War Aviation Centennial Series. Vol. 2. Charleston (S.C.): Aeronaut Books. ISBN 978-1-935881-09-4.
- Imrie, Alex (1989). German Naval Air Service. London: Arms and Armour. ISBN 0853689202.
- Jackson, Robert (2005). The Encyclopedia of Military Aircraft. Bath, UK: Paragon. p. 185. ISBN 1-40542-465-6.
- Owers, Colin A. (2015). Hansa-Brandenburg Aircraft of WWI: Volume 2–Biplane Seaplanes. Great War Aviation Centennial Series. Vol. 18. n.p.: Aeronaut Books. ISBN 978-1-935881-32-2.
