= Heavy bomber =

Bomber aircraft of the largest size and load carrying capacity

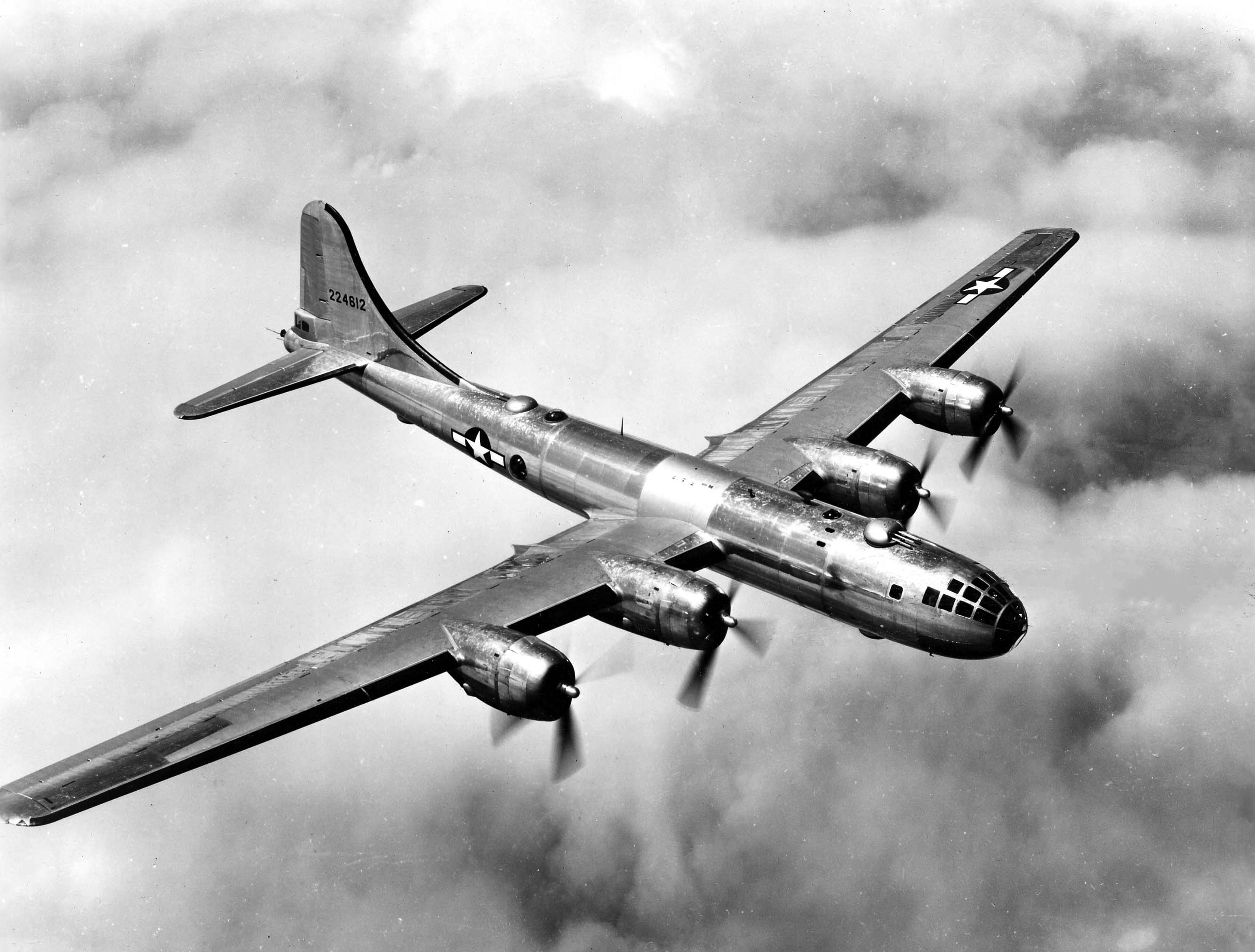
USAAF B-29 Superfortress, a heavy bomber.

Heavy bombers are bomber aircraft capable of delivering the largest payload of air-to-ground weaponry (usually bombs) and longest range (takeoff to landing) of their era. Archetypal heavy bombers have therefore usually been among the largest and most powerful military aircraft at any point in time. In the second half of the 20th century, heavy bombers were largely superseded by strategic bombers, which were often even larger in size, had much longer ranges and were capable of delivering nuclear bombs.

Because of advances in aircraft design and engineering — especially in powerplants and aerodynamics — the size of payloads carried by heavy bombers has increased at rates greater than increases in the size of their airframes. The largest bombers of World War I, the Riesenflugzeuge of Germany, could carry a payload of up to 4,400 pounds (2,000 kg) of bombs; by the latter half of World War II, the Avro Lancaster (introduced in 1942) routinely delivered payloads of 14,000 pounds (6,400 kg) (and sometimes up to 22,000 lb (10,000 kg)) and had a range of 2,530 miles (4,070 km), while the B-29 (1944) delivered payloads in excess of 20,000 pounds (9,100 kg) and had a range of 3,250 miles (5,230 km). By the late 1950s, the jet-powered Boeing B-52 Stratofortress, travelling at speeds of up to 650 miles per hour (1,050 km/h) (more than double that of a Lancaster), could deliver a payload of 70,000 pounds (32,000 kg), over a combat radius of 4,480 miles (7,210 km).

During World War II, mass production techniques made available large, long-range heavy bombers in such quantities as to allow strategic bombing campaigns to be developed and employed. This culminated in August 1945, when B-29s of the United States Army Air Forces dropped atomic bombs over Hiroshima and Nagasaki in Japan.

The arrival of nuclear weapons and guided missiles permanently changed the nature of military aviation and strategy. After the 1950s intercontinental ballistic missiles and ballistic missile submarines began to supersede heavy bombers in the strategic nuclear role. Along with the emergence of more accurate precision-guided munitions ("smart bombs") and nuclear-armed missiles, which could be carried and delivered by smaller aircraft, these technological advancements eclipsed the heavy bomber's once-central role in strategic warfare by the late 20th century. Heavy bombers have, nevertheless, been used to deliver conventional weapons in several regional conflicts since World War II (for example, B-52s in the Vietnam War).

Heavy bombers are now operated only by the air forces of the United States, Russia and China. They serve in both strategic and tactical bombing roles.

== History ==
=== World War I ===
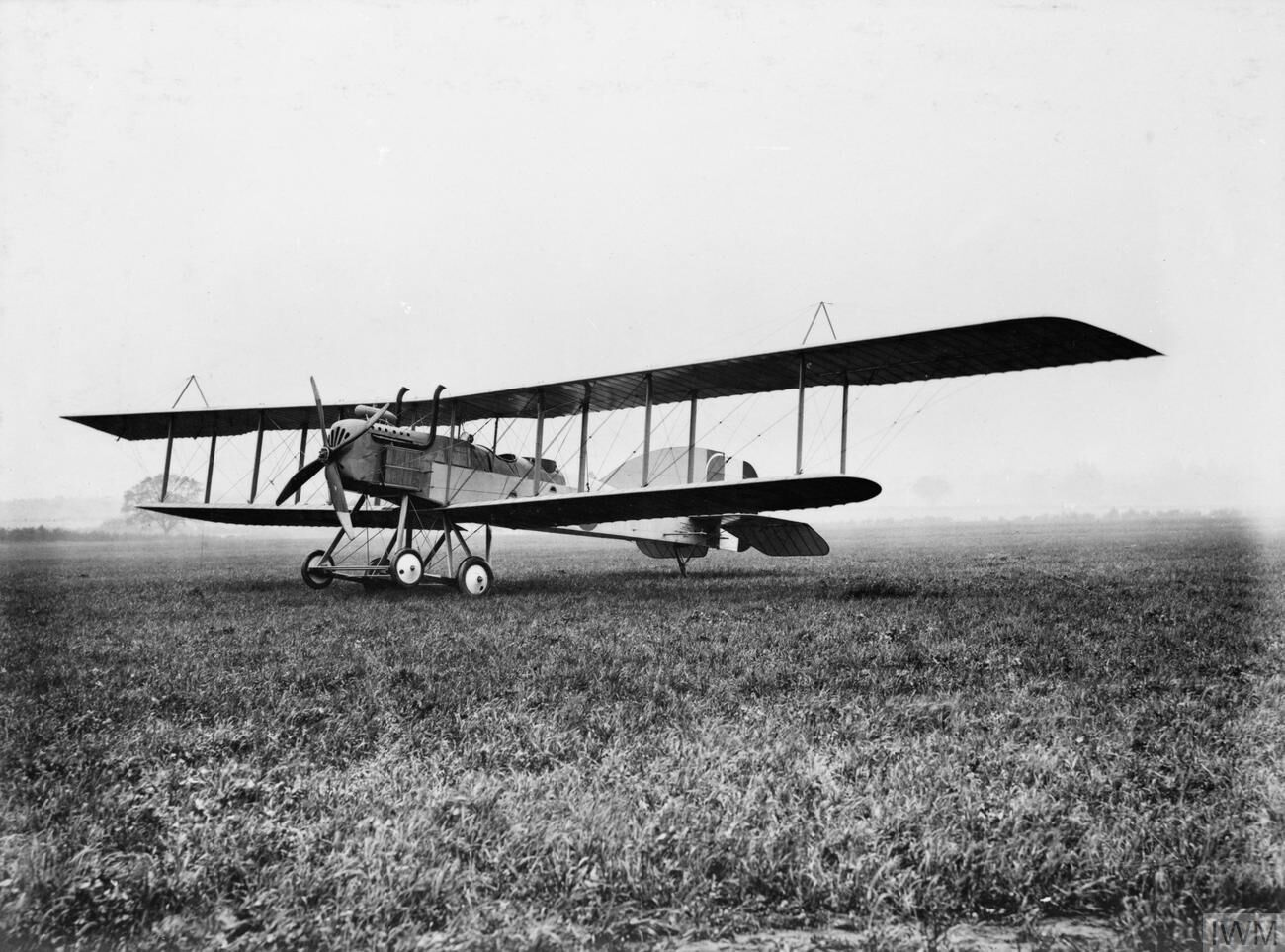
The British produced Short Bomber

The first heavy bomber was designed as an airliner. Igor Sikorsky, an engineer educated in St Petersburg, but born in Kiev of Polish-Russian ancestry designed the Sikorsky Ilya Muromets to fly between his birthplace and his new home. It did so briefly until August 1914, when the Russo-Balt wagon factory converted to a bomber version, with British Sunbeam Crusader V8 engines in place of the German ones in the passenger plane. By December 1914 a squadron of 10 was bombing German positions on the Eastern Front and by summer 1916 there were twenty. It was well-armed with nine machine guns, including a tail gun and initially was immune to German and Austro-Hungarian air attack. The Sikorsky bomber had a wingspan just a few feet shorter than that of a World War II Avro Lancaster, while being able to carry a bomb load of only 3% of the later aircraft.

The Handley Page Type O/100 owed a lot to Sikorsky's ideas; of similar size, it used just two Rolls-Royce Eagle engines and could carry up to 2,000 lb (910 kg) of bombs. The O/100 was designed at the beginning of the war for the Royal Navy specifically to sink the German High Seas Fleet in Kiel: the Navy called for “a bloody paralyser of an aircraft” Entering service in late 1916 and based near Dunkirk in France, it was used for daylight raids on naval targets, damaging a German destroyer. But after one was lost, the O/100 switched to night attacks.

The uprated Handley Page Type O/400 could carry a 1,650 lb (750 kg) bomb, and wings of up to 40 were used by the newly formed, independent Royal Air Force from April 1918 to make strategic raids on German railway and industrial targets. A single O/400 was used to support T. E. Lawrence's Sinai and Palestine Campaign.

The Imperial German Air Service operated the Gotha bomber, which developed a series of marques. The Gotha G.IV operated from occupied Belgium from the Spring of 1917. It mounted several raids on London beginning in May 1917. Some reached no further than Folkestone or Sheerness on the Kent Coast. But on June 13, Gothas killed 162 civilians, including 18 children in a primary school, and injured 432 in East London. Initially, defence against air attack was poor, but by May 19, 1918, when 38 Gothas attacked London, six were shot down and another crashed on landing.

German aircraft companies also built a number of giant bombers, collectively known as the Riesenflugzeug. Most were produced in very small numbers from 1917 onwards and several never entered service. The most numerous were the Zeppelin-Staaken R.VI of which 13 saw service, bombing Russia and London: four were shot down and six lost on landing. The R.VIs were larger than the standard Luftwaffe bombers of World War II.

The Vickers Vimy, a long-range heavy bomber powered by two Rolls-Royce Eagle engines, was delivered to the newly formed Royal Air Force too late to see action (only one was in France at time of the Armistice with Germany). The Vimy's intended use was to bomb industrial and railway targets in western Germany, which it could reach with its range of 900 miles (1,400 km) and a bomb load of just over a ton. The Vickers Vimy is best known as the aircraft that made the first Atlantic crossing from St John's Newfoundland to Clifden in Ireland piloted by the Englishman John Alcock and navigated by Scot Arthur Whitten Brown on June 14, 1919.

=== Strategic bomber theory ===
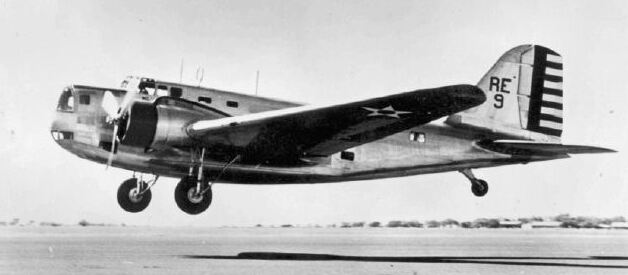
The Douglas B-18 Bolo on takeoff

Between the wars, aviation opinion fixed on two tenets. The first was that “the bomber will always get through.” The speed advantage of biplane fighters over bombers was insignificant, and it was believed that they would never catch them. Furthermore, there was no effective method of detecting incoming bombers at sufficiently long range to scramble fighters on an interception course. In practice, a combination of new radar technology and advances in monoplane fighter design eroded this disadvantage. Throughout the war, bombers continually managed to strike their targets, but suffered unacceptable losses in the absence of careful planning and escort fighters. Only the later de Havilland Mosquito light bomber was fast enough to evade fighters. Heavy bombers needed defensive armament for protection, which reduced their effective bomb payload.

The second tenet was that strategic bombing of industrial capacity, power generation, oil refineries, and coal mines could win a war. This was certainly vindicated by the firebombing of Japanese cities and the two atomic bombs dropped on Hiroshima and Nagasaki in August 1945, as Japan's fragile housing and cottage industry made themselves easily vulnerable to attack, thus completely destroying Japanese industrial production (see Air Raids on Japan). It was less evident that it held true for the bombing of Germany. During the war, German industrial production actually increased, despite a sustained Allied bombing campaign.

As the German Luftwaffe's main task was to support the army, it never developed a successful heavy bomber. The prime proponent of strategic bombing, Luftwaffe Chief of Staff General Walther Wever, died in an air crash in 1936 on the very day that the specification for the Ural bomber (later won by the Heinkel He 177 which saw only limited use against the Soviet Union and the United Kingdom) was published. After Wever's death, Ernst Udet, development director at the Air Ministry steered the Luftwaffe towards dive bombers instead.

=== World War II ===
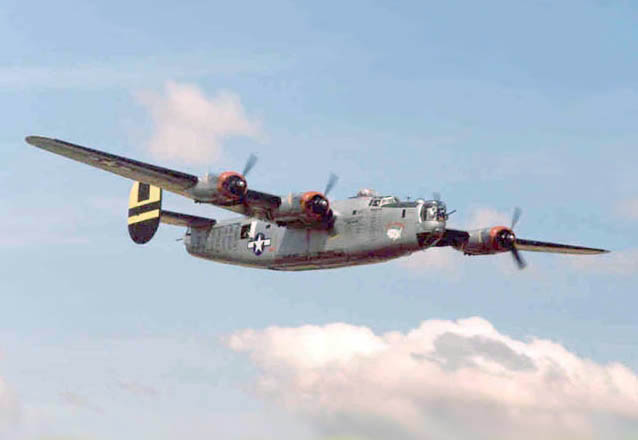
The USAAF B-24 Liberator

When Britain and France declared war on Germany in September 1939, the RAF had no heavy bomber yet in service; heavy bomber designs had started in 1936 and ordered in 1938.

The Handley Page Halifax and Avro Lancaster both originated as twin-engine "medium" bombers, but were rapidly redesigned for four Rolls-Royce Merlin engines and rushed into service once the technical problems of the larger Rolls-Royce Vulture emerged in the Avro Manchester. The Halifax joined squadrons in November 1940 and flew its first raid against Le Havre on the night of 11–12 March 1941. British heavy bomber designs often had three gun turrets with a total of 8 machine guns.

In January 1941, the Short Stirling reached operational status and first combat missions were flown in February. It was based on the successful Short Sunderland flying boat and shared its Bristol Hercules radial engines, wing, and cockpit with a new fuselage. It carried up to 14,000 lb (6,400 kg) of bombs—almost twice the load of a Boeing B-17 Flying Fortress—but over just a 300-mile (480 km) radius. Due to its thick, short wing it was able to out-turn the main German night fighters, the Messerschmitt Bf 110 and the Junkers Ju 88. Heavy bombers still needed defensive armament for protection, even at night. The Stirling's low operational ceiling of just 12,000 ft (3,700 m)—also caused by the thick wing—meant that it was usually picked on by night fighters; within five months, 67 of the 84 aircraft in service had been lost. The bomb bay layout limited the size and types of bombs carried and it was relegated to secondary duties such as tug and paratrooper transport.

Due to the absence of British heavy bombers, 20 United States Army Air Corps Boeing B-17 Flying Fortresses were lent to the RAF, which during July 1941 commenced daylight attacks on warships and docks at Wilhelmshaven and Brest. These raids were complete failures. After eight aircraft were lost due to combat or breakdown and with many engine failures, the RAF stopped daylight bombing by September. It was clear that the B-17C model was not combat ready and that its five machine guns provided inadequate protection.

Combat feedback enabled Boeing engineers to improve the aircraft; when the first model B-17E began operating from English airfields in July 1942, it had many more defensive gun positions including a vitally important tail gunner. Eventually, U.S. heavy bomber designs, optimized for formation flying, had 10 or more machine guns and/or cannons in both powered turrets and manually operated flexible mounts to deliver protective arcs of fire. These guns were located in tail turrets, side gun ports either just behind the bombardier's clear nose glazing as "cheek" positions, or midway along the rear fuselage sides as "waist" positions. U.S. bombers carried .50 caliber machine gun, and dorsal (spine/top of aircraft) and ventral (belly/bottom of aircraft) guns with powered turrets. All of these machine guns could defend against attack when beyond the range of fighter escort; eventually, a total of 13 machine guns were fitted in the B-17G model. In order to assemble combat boxes of several aircraft, and later combat wings formed of a number of boxes, assembly ships were used to speed up formation.

Even this extra firepower, which increased empty weight by 20% and required more powerful versions of the Wright Cyclone engine, was insufficient to prevent serious losses in daylight. Escort fighters were needed but the RAF interceptors such as the Supermarine Spitfire had very limited endurance. An early raid on Rouen-Sotteville rail yards in Brittany on August 17, 1942, required four Spitfire squadrons outbound and five more for the return trip.

The USAAF chose to attack aircraft factories and component plants. On August 17, 1943, 230 Fortresses attacked a ball-bearing plant in Schweinfurt and again two months later, with 291 bombers, in the second raid on Schweinfurt. The works was severely damaged but at a huge cost: 36 aircraft lost in the first raid, 77 in the second. Altogether 850 airmen were killed or captured; only 33 Fortresses returned from the October raid undamaged

With the arrival of North American P-51 Mustangs and the fitting of drop tanks to increase the range of the Republic P-47 Thunderbolt for the Big Week offensive, between February 20–25, 1944, bombers were escorted all the way to the target and back. Losses were reduced to 247 out of 3,500 sorties, still devastating but accepted at the time.

The Consolidated B-24 Liberator and later version of the Fortress carried even more extensive defensive armament fitted into Sperry ball turrets. This was a superb defensive weapon that rotated a full 360 degrees horizontally with a 90-degree elevation. Its twin M2 Browning machine guns had an effective range of 1,000 yards (910 m). The Liberator was the result of a proposal to assemble Fortresses in Consolidated plants, with the company returning with its own design of a longer-range, faster and higher-flying aircraft that could carry an extra ton of bombs. Early orders were for France (delivered to the RAF after the fall of France) and Britain, already at war, with just a batch of 36 for the USAAF.

Neither the USAAF nor the RAF judged the initial design suitable for bombing and it was first used on a variety of VIP transport and maritime patrol missions. Its long range, however, persuaded the USAAF to send 177 Liberators from Benghazi in Libya to bomb the Romanian oilfields on August 1, 1943, in Operation Tidal Wave. Due to navigational errors and alerted German flak batteries and fighters, only half returned to base although a few landed safely at RAF bases in Cyprus and some in Turkey, where they were interned. Only 33 were undamaged. Damage to the refineries was soon repaired.

By October 1942, a new Ford Motor Company plant at Willow Run Michigan was assembling Liberators. Production reached a rate of over one an hour in 1944 helping the B-24 to become the most produced US aircraft of all time. It became the standard heavy bomber in the Pacific and the only one used by the RAAF. The SAAF used Liberators to drop weapons and ammunition during the Warsaw Uprising in 1944.

The Avro Manchester was a twin-engine bomber powered by the ambitious 24-cylinder Rolls-Royce Vulture, but was rapidly redesigned for four Rolls-Royce Merlin engines due to technical problems with the Vulture which caused the aircraft to be unreliable, under-powered and hastened its withdrawal from service. Reaching squadrons early in 1942, the redesigned bomber with four Merlin engines and longer wings was renamed Avro Lancaster; it could deliver a 14,000 lb (6,400 kg) load of bombs or up to 22,000 lb (10,000 kg) with special modifications. The Lancaster's bomb bay was undivided, so that bombs of extraordinary size and weight such as the 10-ton Grand Slam could be carried.

Barnes Wallis, deputy chief aircraft designer at Vickers, spent much time thinking about weapons that might shorten the war. He conceived his “Spherical Bomb, Surface Torpedo” after watching his daughter flip pebbles over water. Two versions of the 'bouncing bomb' were developed: the smaller Highball was to be used against ships and attracted essential British Admiralty funding for his project. A 1,280 lb (580 kg) flying torpedo, of which half was Torpex torpedo explosive, it was developed specifically to sink the Tirpitz which was moored in Trondheim fjord behind torpedo nets. Development delays in the 'bouncing bomb' meant that another Barnes Wallis invention, the 5-ton Tallboy was deployed instead; two Tallboys dropped by Avro Lancasters from 25,000 ft (7,600 m) altitude hit at near-supersonic speed and capsized the Tirpitz on November 12, 1944. Upkeep, the larger version of the bouncing bomb, was used to destroy the Mohne and Eder dams by Lancasters from the specially recruited and trained No. 617 Squadron RAF, often known as "the Dam Busters", under Wing Commander Guy Gibson.

In March and April 1945, as the war in Europe was ending, Lancasters dropped Grand Slams and Tallboys on U-boat pens and railway viaducts across north Germany. At Bielefeld more than 100 yards (91 m) of railway viaduct was destroyed by Grand Slams creating an earthquake effect, which shook the foundations.

The Boeing B-29 Superfortress was a development of the Fortress, but a larger design with four Wright R-3350 Duplex-Cyclone engines of much greater power, enabling it to fly higher, faster, further and with a bigger bomb load. The mammoth new Wright radial engines were susceptible to overheating if anything malfunctioned, and technical problems with the powerplant seriously delayed the B-29's operational service debut. The aircraft had four remotely operated twin-gun turrets on its fuselage, controlled through an analog computer sighting system; the operator could use any of a trio of Perspex ball stations. Only the tail gunner manually controlled his gun turret station in the rear of the airplane.

B-29s were initially deployed to bases in India and China, from which they could reach Japan; but the logistics (including transport of fuel for the B-29 fleet over the Himalayan range) of flying from these remote, primitive airfields were complicated and costly. The island of Saipan in the Marianas was assaulted to provide Pacific air bases from which to bomb Japanese cities. Initial high-level, daylight bombing raids using high-explosive bombs on Japanese cities with their wood and paper houses produced disappointing results; the bombers were then switched to low-level, nighttime incendiary attacks for which they had not originally been designed (one variant, the B-29B was specially modified for low altitude night missions by removal of armament and other equipment). Japan burned furiously from the B-29 incendiary raids. On August 6, 1945, B-29 Enola Gay dropped an atomic bomb on Hiroshima. Three days later, B-29 Bockscar dropped another on Nagasaki. The war ended when Japan announced its surrender to the Allies on August 15, and the Japanese government subsequently signed the official instrument of surrender on September 2, 1945.

=== After World War II ===
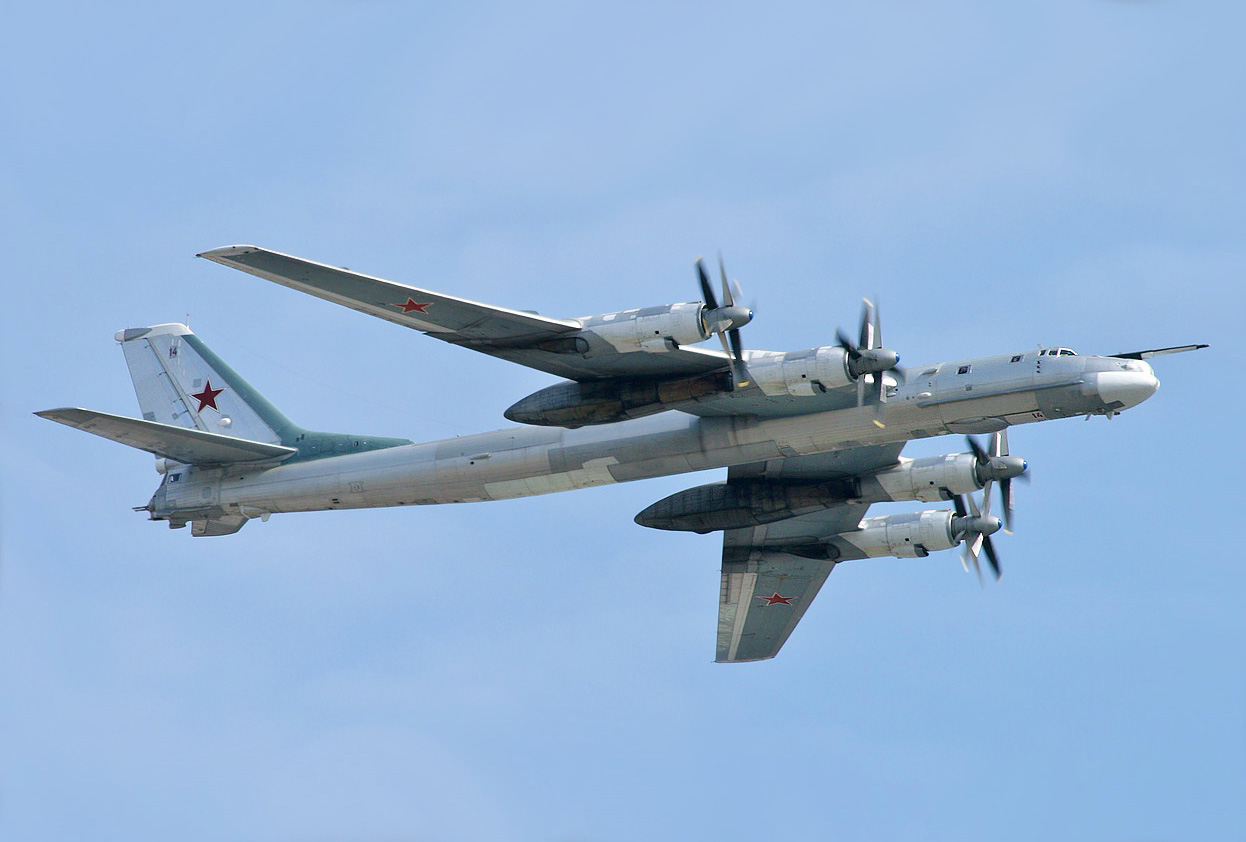
The Soviet Air Force Tu-95 heavy bomber

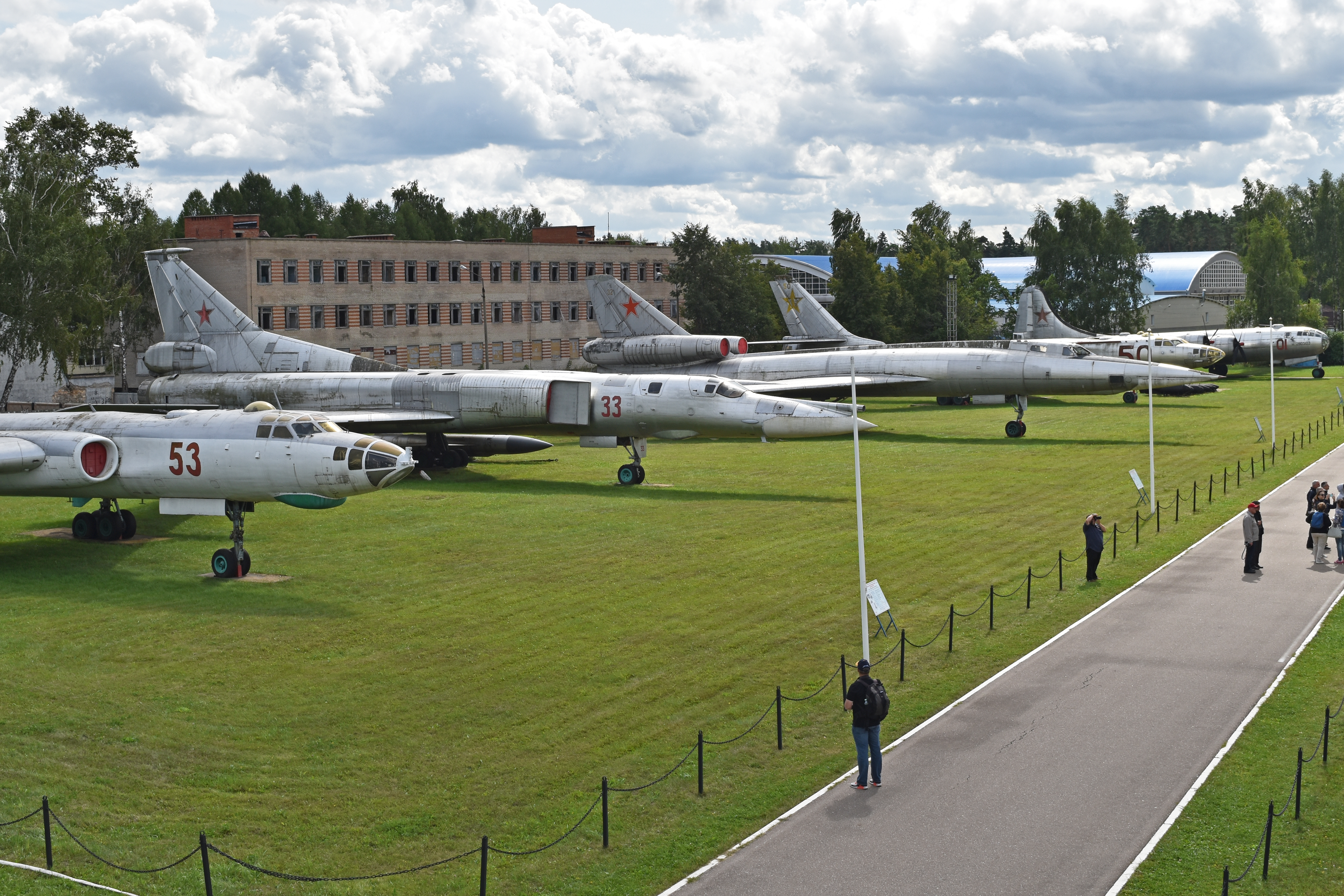
Line-up of Soviet Cold War heavy bombers of Soviet Strategic Aviation, from Tu-4 to Tu-22M

After World War II, the name strategic bomber came into use, for aircraft that could carry aircraft ordnances over long distances behind enemy lines. They were supplemented by smaller fighter-bombers with less range and lighter bomb load, for tactical strikes. Later these were called strike fighters, attack aircraft and multirole combat aircraft.

When North Korea attacked South Korea in 1950 the USAF responded with daylight bomber raids on supply lines through North Korea. B-29 Superfortresses flew from Japan on behalf of the United Nations, but the supply line for North Korea's army from the Soviet Union was physically and politically out of reach: North Korea for the most part lacked worthwhile strategic targets of its own. The Soviet-backed Northern forces easily routed the South Korean army. The distance to North Korea was too great for fighter escorts based in Japan, so the B-29s flew alone. In November, Mikoyan-Gurevich MiG-15s flown by Soviet pilots started to intercept the US bombers over North Korea. The MiG-15 was specifically designed to destroy US heavy bombers; it could out-perform any fighter deployed by United Nations air forces until the capable F-86 Sabre was produced in greater numbers and brought to Korea. After 28 B-29s were lost, the bombers were restricted to night interdiction and concentrated on destroying supply routes, including the bridges over the Yalu river into China.

By the 1960s, manned heavy bombers could not match the intercontinental ballistic missile in the strategic nuclear role. More accurate precision-guided munitions ("smart bombs"), nuclear-armed missiles or bombs were able to be carried by smaller aircraft such as fighter-bombers and multirole fighters. Despite these technological innovations and new capabilities of other contemporary military aircraft, large strategic bombers such as the B-1, B-52 and B-2 have been retained for the role of carpet bombing in several conflicts. The most prolific example (in terms of total bomb tonnage) is the U.S. Air Force B-52 Stratofortress during the 1960s–early 1970s Vietnam War era, in Operation Menu, Operation Freedom Deal, and Operation Linebacker II. In 1987 the Soviet Tu-160—the heaviest supersonic bomber/aircraft currently in active service—entered service; it can carry twelve long-range cruise missiles.

The 2010 New START agreement between the United States of America and the Russian Federation defined a "heavy bomber" by two characteristics:

- range greater than 8,000 kilometres (5,000 miles)
- equipped for long-range nuclear "air-launched cruise missiles" (ALCMs), defined as an air-to-surface cruise missile of a type flight-tested from an aircraft or deployed on a bomber after 1986.

== List of heavy bombers ==
Some notable heavy bombers are listed below

=== World War I ===
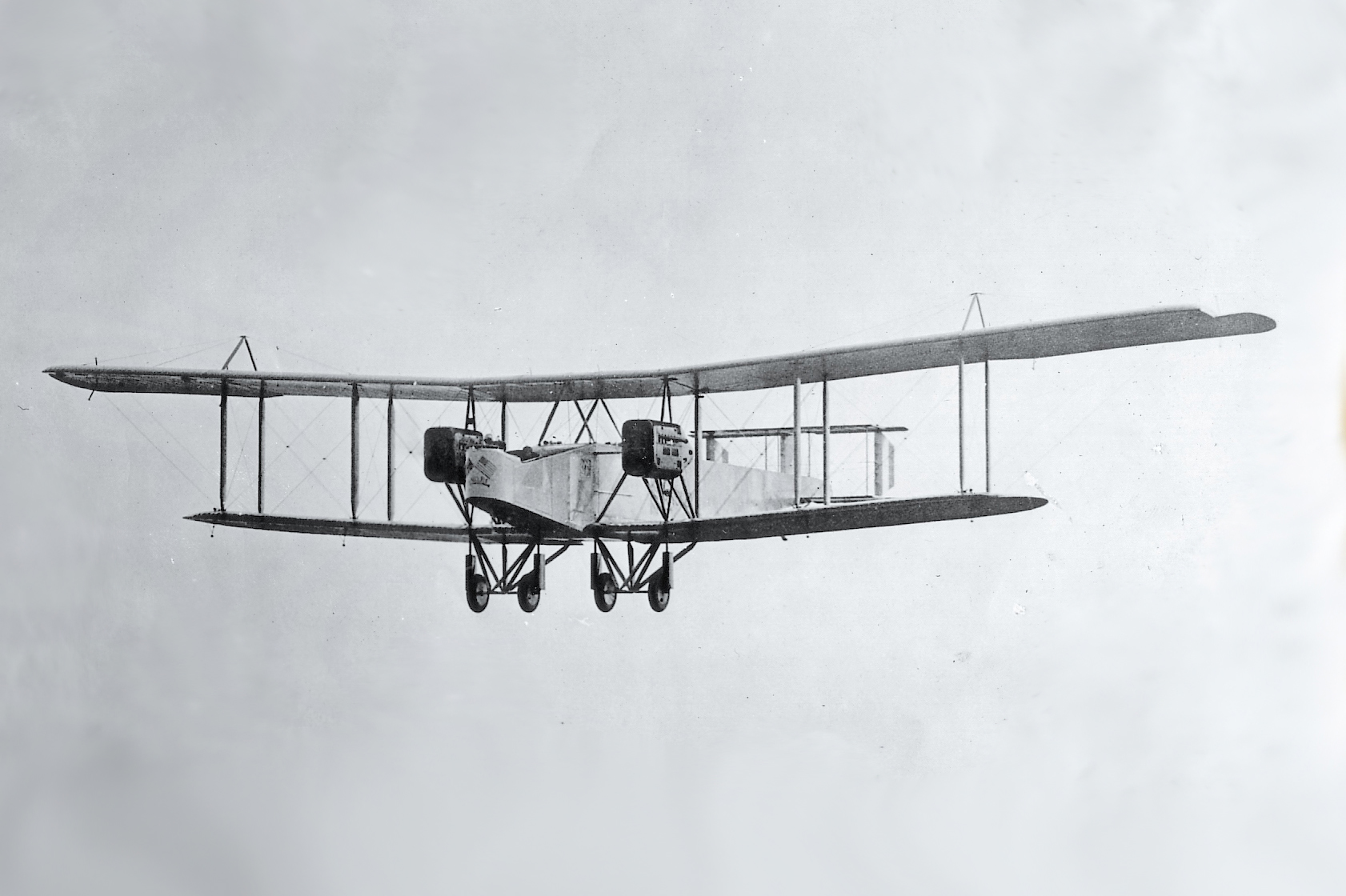
The Handley O/400 in flight

- AEG G.I, II, III, IV, V, R.I
- Airco DH.10 Amiens
- Albatros G.I, II, III
- Blériot 73
- Caproni Ca.1, Ca.3 Ca.4, Ca.5
- Caudron R.11
- Farman F.50
- Friedrichshafen G.II, G.III, G.IV
- Gotha G.I, G.II, G.III, G.IV G.V
- Handley Page Type O/100 & O/400
- Handley Page V/1500
- Letord Let.3 6 & 7
- Martin MB-1
- Rumpler G.I, G.II & G.III
- Short Bomber
- Sikorsky Ilya Muromets
- Vickers Vimy
- Zeppelin-Staaken R.VI
- Zeppelin-Staaken R.XV
- Zeppelin-Staaken R.XVI

=== Interwar period (interbellum) ===
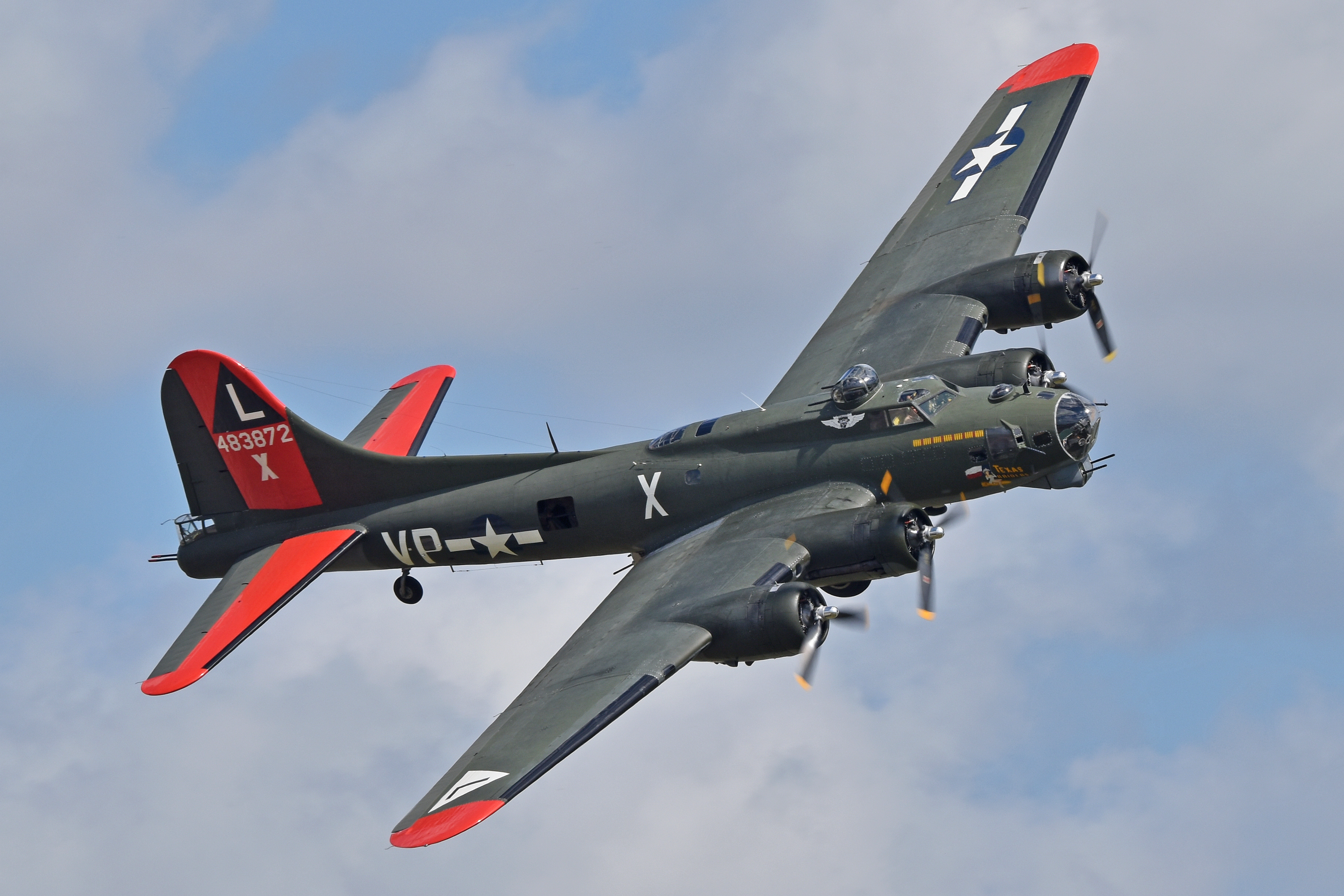
The Boeing B-17 Flying Fortress in flight

- Armstrong Whitworth Whitley
- Avro 549 Aldershot
- Avro Manchester
- Blériot 127
- Boeing B-17 Flying Fortress
- Boeing XB-15
- Boulton Paul P.32
- Bréguet 410
- Bristol Bombay
- Curtiss B-2 Condor
- De Havilland DH.72
- Dornier Do 11
- Dornier Do-19
- Douglas Y1B-7
- Douglas B-18 Bolo
- Douglas XB-19
- Fairey Hendon
- Farman BN.4
- Farman F.60 Goliath
- Farman F.120
- Farman F.220
- Fokker XB-8
- Friedrichshafen G.V
- Handley Page H.P.54 Harrow
- Handley Page Heyford
- Handley Page Hinaidi
- Handley Page Hyderabad
- Junkers Ju 89
- Lioré et Olivier LeO 20
- Martin NBS-1/MB-2
- Mitsubishi Ki-20
- Mitsubishi Ki-21
- Sikorsky XBLR-3
- Tupolev TB-1
- Tupolev TB-3
- Vickers Virginia

=== World War II ===
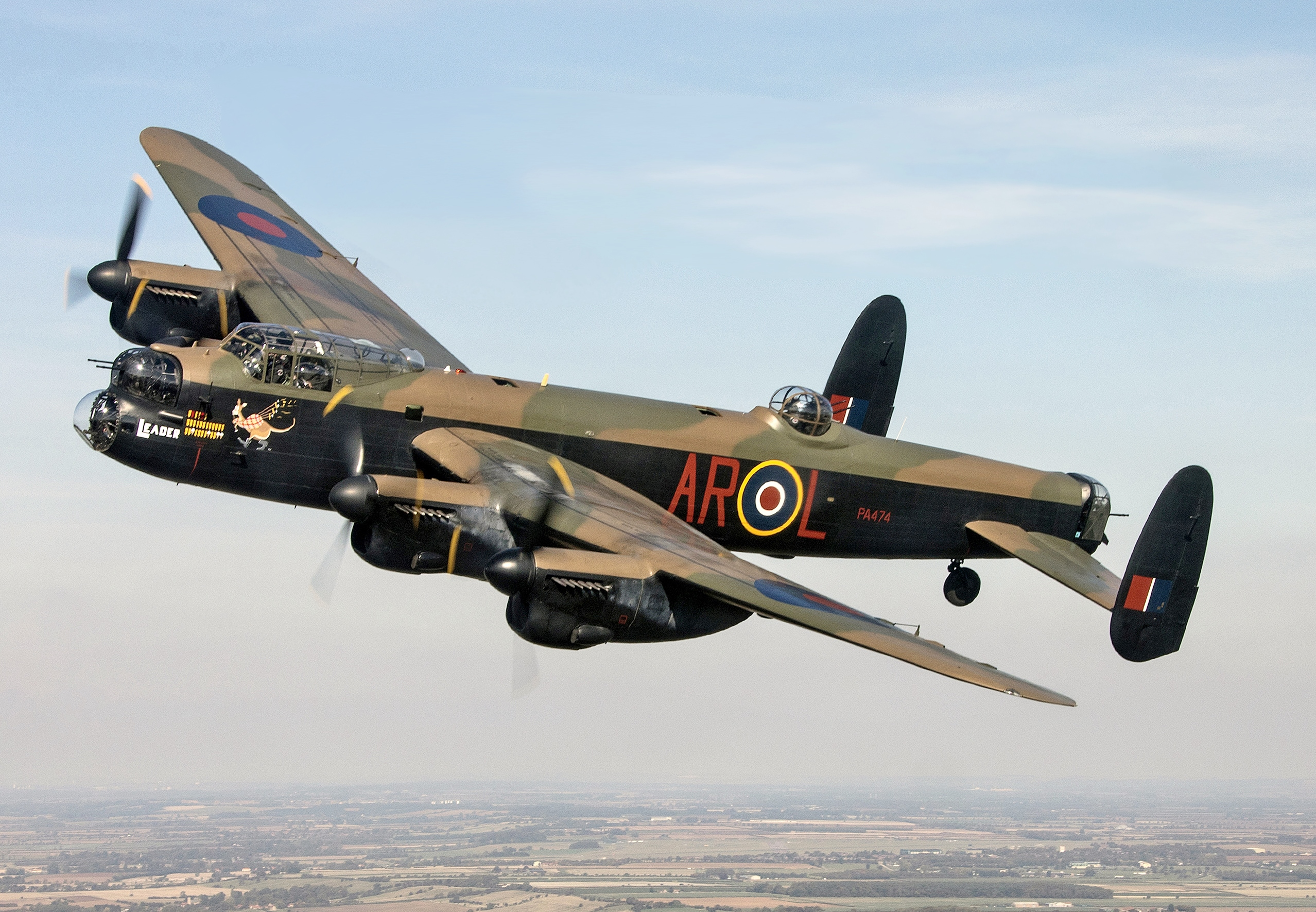
The Avro Lancaster in a Battle of Britain Memorial flight

- Arado E.555
- Avro Lancaster
- Avro Lincoln
- Bloch MB.162
- Bréguet 482
- Consolidated B-24 Liberator
- Boeing B-29 Superfortress
- Boeing XB-38
- Boeing XB-39
- Consolidated B-32 Dominator
- Focke Wulf Ta 400
- Handley Page Halifax
- Heinkel He 177
- Heinkel He 274
- Heinkel He 277
- Horten H.XVIII
- Junkers EF 132
- Junkers Ju 290
- Junkers Ju 390
- Junkers Ju 488
- Messerschmitt Me 264
- Nakajima G5N Shinzan
- Nakajima G8N Renzan
- Nakajima Fugaku
- Piaggio P.108
- Savoia-Marchetti SM.82
- Short Stirling
- Supermarine B.12/36
- Vickers Warwick
- Vickers Windsor
- Petlyakov Pe-8

=== Post-WW2 ===
- Avro Vulcan
- Boeing B-47 Stratojet
- Boeing B-50 Superfortress
- Boeing B-52 Stratofortress
- Boeing B-54
- Boeing XB-55
- Convair B-36 Peacemaker
- Convair B-58 Hustler
- Convair YB-60
- Handley Page Victor
- Myasishchev M-4
- Myasishchev M-50
- Northrop Grumman B-2 Spirit
- Northrop Grumman B-21 Raider
- Northrop YB-35
- Northrop YB-49
- Rockwell B-1 Lancer
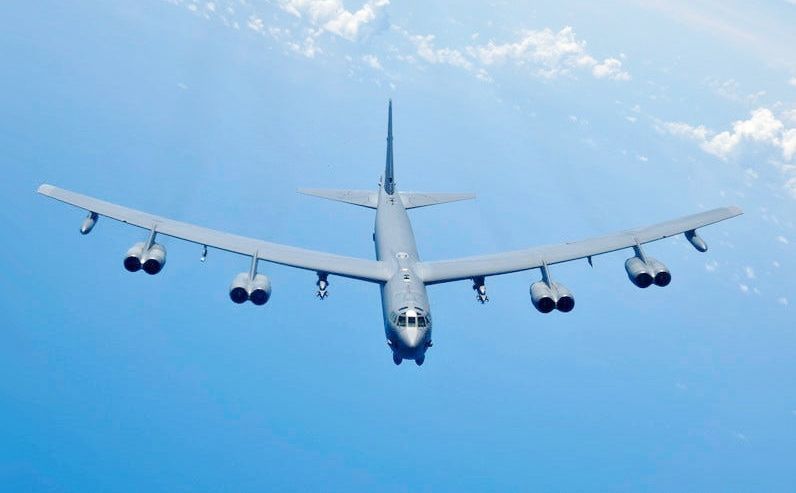
  A USAF Boeing B-52 Stratofortress
- Short Sperrin
- Sukhoi T-4
- Tupolev Tu-4
- Tupolev Tu-16
- Tupolev Tu-22
- Tupolev Tu-22M
- Tupolev Tu-95
- Tupolev Tu-160
- Vickers Valiant
- Xian H-6
- Xi'an H-20
