= Friedrichshafen G.II =

1916 German bomber aircraft

G.II
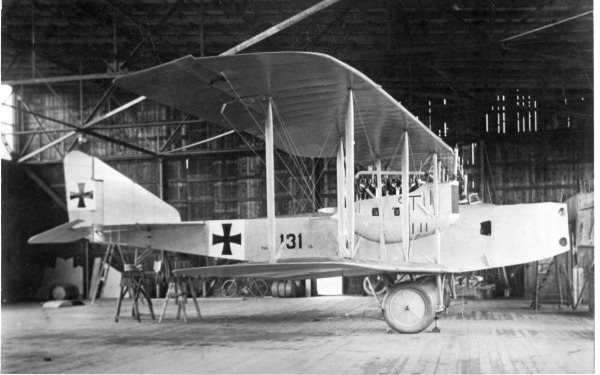

General information
- Type: Bomber
- Manufacturer: Flugzeugbau Friedrichshafen GmbH
- Designer: Karl Gehlen
- Primary user: Luftstreitkräfte
- Number built: 18 by Friedrichshafen and 30 by Daimler Motoren Gesellschaft

History
- Manufactured: 1916
- First flight: July 1916
- Developed from: Friedrichshafen G.I
- Developed into: Friedrichshafen G.III

The Friedrichshafen G.II (factory designation FF.38) was a heavy bomber aircraft that was designed and manufactured in Germany during World War I by Flugzeugbau Friedrichshafen. The plane was used by the Luftstreitkräfte (German Imperial Air Service) for tactical and limited strategic bombing operations.

While the G.I had been a generally successful design it was clear it needed further improvement before it was fit for combat. The G.I was thus developed further into the G.II. The wings now only had two pairs of interplane struts on each side of the fuselage and the box shaped tail unit was replaced by a simple horizontal and vertical stabilizer assembly. Experience with the G.I had shown it to be underpowered and the G.II had more powerful six-cylinder 150 kW (200 hp) Benz Bz.IV engines installed which increased the bomb load. The increase in power also enabled the installation of a second defensive machine gun aft of the wings between the propellers which were still mounted in a pusher configuration. The crew still consisted of three men, a rear gunner, a pilot and a bomb aimer who doubled as a nose gunner.

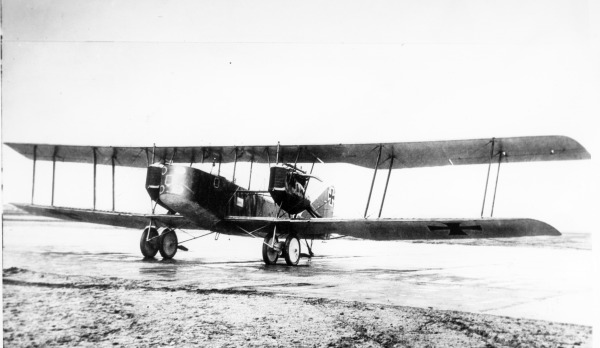

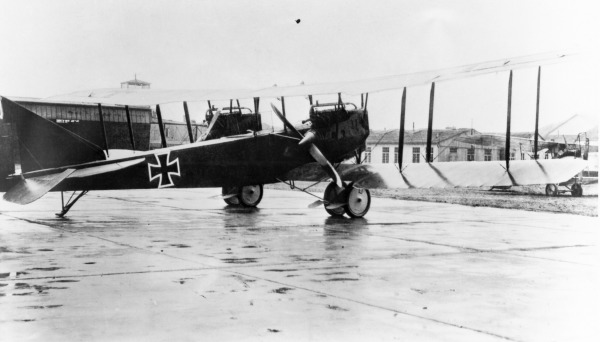

== Operational history ==
While the Friedrichshafen G.I remained a prototype the G.II went into production with 35 aircraft being built by Friedrichshafen (18 built) and Daimler (17 built). The G.II saw active service from early 1916 with German bomber units on the Western Front and in Macedonia where it was mostly used for tactical bombing operations. At first these were conducted in daylight but later, as losses mounted, most attacks were conducted at night.

== Operators ==
- German Empire
  - Luftstreitkrafte

== Specifications (FF.38) ==
Data from

General characteristics

- Crew: 3
- Length: 11.41 m (37 ft 5 in)
- Upper wingspan: 19.7 m (64 ft 8 in)
- Lower wingspan: 18.85 m (61 ft 10 in)
- Height: 3.65 m (12 ft 0 in)
- Wing area: 75 m^{2} (810 sq ft)
- Empty weight: 1,930 kg (4,255 lb)
- Gross weight: 3,171 kg (6,991 lb)
- Powerplant: 2 × Benz Bz.IV 6-cylinder water-cooled in-line piston engines, 150 kW (200 hp) each
- Propellers: 2-bladed pusher propellers

Armament

- Guns: 3 × 7.92 mm (0.312 in) Parabellum MG14 machine guns
- Bombs: 300 kg (660 lb) of bombs

== See also ==
- Idflieg aircraft designation system

Related development

- Friedrichshafen G.I
- Friedrichshafen G.III
- Friedrichshafen G.IV & V

Aircraft of comparable role, configuration, and era

- AEG G.I, G.II, G.III, G.IV
- Gotha G.I, G.II, G.III, G.IV, G.V

== Bibliography ==
- Herris, Jack (2016). Friedrichshafen Aircraft of WWI: A Centennial Perspective on Great War Airplanes. Great War Aviation Centennial Series. Vol. 21. Charleston, South Carolina: Aeronaut Books. ISBN 978-1-935881-35-3.
