= Georg Zeumer =

German World War I fighter pilot

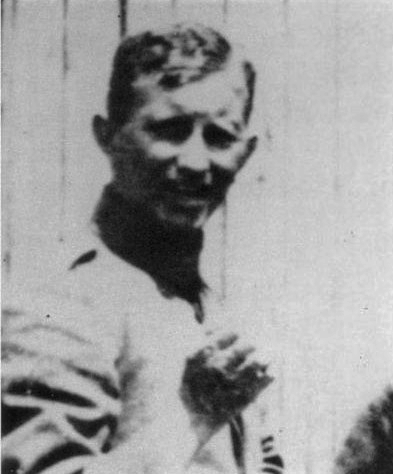
- Born: 7 March 1890; Nikolai, Province of Silesia, German Empire
- Died: 17 June 1917 (aged 27); Honnecourt-sur-Escaut, French Third Republic
- Resting place: Evangelic Cemetery in Mikołów, Poland

Georg Zeumer (7 March 1890 – 17 June 1917) was a German World War I fighter pilot known primarily as the man who taught Manfred von Richthofen (the Red Baron) to fly. Zeumer served in the famed Jasta Boelcke (Jasta 2), which produced a number of German World War I aces. He shot down four confirmed planes before dying in combat in 1917.

== Early life ==
Georg Zeumer was born in Nikolai, German Empire, on 7 March 1890, to a family of factory owners.

== Military service ==
Zeumer reportedly already had a pilot's license when World War I broke out in mid-1914. He joined the German flying service in August, and served with Feldflieger Abteilung 4 (Field Flyer Detachment 4, or FFA 4). By November 1914, he had been awarded the Iron Cross and the Knight's Cross of the Military Order of St. Henry. At some point he also received an Ehrenbecher, or "honor cup", one of many engraved silver goblets given as awards to German airmen.

From May to August 1915, Zeumer flew on the Eastern Front with Feldflieger Abteilung 69 (FFA 69), where he befriended Manfred von Richthofen, better known as the Red Baron. Richthofen, then an observer with no victories to his credit, would go on to become the highest-scoring ace of World War I. Zeumer was Richthofen's first pilot, and in August 1915, the two men flew a Gotha G.I in Ostend, Belgium, as part of the Brieftauben-Ableitung-Ostende (BAO) unit. Zeumer was with Richthofen during the latter's first aerial combat, in which they tried unsuccessfully to down an Allied reconnaissance plane. Richthofen wrote of the experience:

Arriving home, we were both in a very bad mood. He blamed me for having shot badly, and I blamed him for not having brought me into a good firing position — in short, our aviation rapport, which was so splendid before, had suffered badly.

— Manfred von Richthofen

Despite this spat, Richthofen and Zeumer had a close relationship, with Richthofen referring to Zeumer as "my good friend" and writing that Zeumer "flew with rare skill." When Richthofen decided to move from being an observer to a pilot, it was Zeumer who taught him how to fly.

In early 1916, both men served with bombing unit Kampfgeschwader 2. Zeumer achieved four confirmed victories there, the first of which was a French Nieuport Scout over Douaumont on 11 April 1916. In June 1916, Zeumer was shot down by the French. Although only slightly injured by the crash, he broke his right thigh in a car accident while being transported out, under what Richthofen described as "quite stupid circumstances."

At some point Zeumer was promoted to Oberleutnant, the highest lieutenant officer rank in the German armed forces. In May 1917, he joined Jasta Boelcke, a fighting unit founded by famed German ace Oswald Boelcke.

== Personal life ==
Following the accident that injured his leg in mid-1916, Zeumer developed diabetes. Because his thigh did not heal properly, he was left with one leg nine centimeters shorter than the other, and had to use a walking stick.

Zeumer's comrades nicknamed him "the lunger" because he suffered from tuberculosis, which in those days was fatal. Knowing his days were numbered, Zeumer gained a reputation for being a reckless flier. This attitude earned him the nickname "Black Cat," and he had a black cat insignia painted on his plane.

== Death ==
Oblt. Georg Zeumer was killed on 17 June 1917, while attacking a British R.E.8 two-seater near Honnecourt-sur-Escaut, France. The plane was crewed by Lt. Douglas and Lt. E. O. Houghton of the 59 Squadron. Houghton's combat report reads:

17 June 1917, 9 a.m. Photo Op. East of Honnecourt, 7,000 ft.

Albatros Scout, Nieuport type.

Whilst taking photographs, we saw about 6 enemy aircraft above us. One EA [enemy aircraft] dived and attacked us from the direction of the sun. The EA got on our tail and I opened fire on him at about 50 yards range. He immediately started firing. After I had fired he turned away and stalled, and then did a vertical nosedive. I continued firing and he burst into flames and continued to dive for about 4,000 feet and disappeared.

— Lt. E. O. Houghton

Manfred von Richthofen mentioned Zeumer's death in a letter later published in Ein Heldenleben, a 1920 compilation of his autobiography (The Red Fighter Pilot) and related writings. Historian Norman Franks quotes the passage in his book Jasta Boelcke:

Yesterday, Zeumer was killed in air combat. It was perhaps the best thing that could have happened to him. He knew that he had not much longer to live. Such an excellent and noble fellow. How he would have hated to drag himself toward the inevitable end. For him it would have been tragic. As it is, he died a heroic death before the enemy. During the next few days, his body will be brought home.

— Manfred von Richthofen
