= Becker Type M2 20 mm cannon =

Becker Type M2
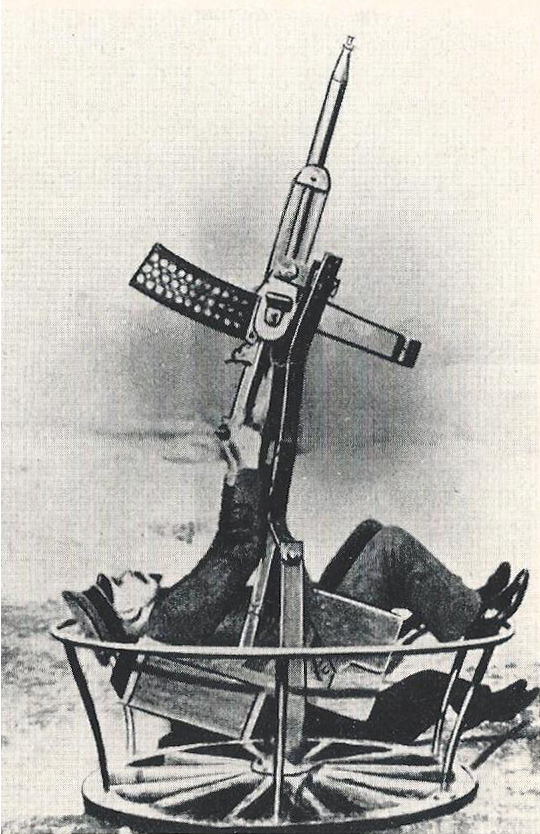
- An artist's rendering of a Becker antiaircraft gun
- Type: Autocannon
- Place of origin: German Empire

Service history
- In service: Imperial German Air Service
- Wars: World War I

Production history
- Designer: Reinhold Becker; August Coenders
- Designed: 1913
- Manufacturer: Stahlwerke Becker
- No. built: 539+
- Variants: SEMAG L; Oerlikon F; Oerlikon L; Oerlikon S

Specifications
- Mass: 30 kg (66 lb)
- Cartridge: 20x70mmRB (130 g)
- Caliber: 20 mm (0.787 in)
- Barrels: 1
- Action: API blowback
- Rate of fire: 325 rpm
- Muzzle velocity: 490 m/s (1,600 ft/s)
- Feed system: 15-rounds box magazine

The Becker Type M2 20 mm cannon was a German autocannon developed for aircraft use during World War I by Stahlwerke Becker. It was first mass-produced in 1916 and was installed in a variety of aircraft. It was the only German autocannon to see service in the air during the war.

The Becker also served as the pattern for the famous Swiss-built Oerlikon 20 mm cannon, which is in service to this day, and in a later form, was the original inspiration, through the Swiss design after World War I, for the World War II German Luftwaffe's MG FF (Maschinengewehr Flügel Fest, "fixed wing-mount automatic ordnance") 20 mm autocannon design.

== History ==
=== Design and development ===
The original design was based on the 19 mm Becker cannon cartridge by the Coenders brothers at Stahlwerke Becker of Reinickendorf, Germany. Development commenced in 1913 and was therefore already advanced when the War Ministry issued a specification in June 1915 calling for an aircraft cannon of under 37 mm caliber and 70 kg weight capable of firing a 10-round burst. Tests commenced shortly thereafter with the weapon mounted in a Gotha G.I, but proved unsatisfactory. Despite this, the potential of the gun was such that Spandau arsenal was engaged to help develop and fine-tune the design, leading to a production contract for 120 Becker Type M2 guns in June 1916. In addition to the orders for aircraft guns placed with Becker, Spandau and MAN also received a contract to build Becker cannon for the Army. The Spandau works developed the gun further, producing it as the Spandau Type 3 20 mm cannon, which was heavier and had a slower rate of fire at 250/min.

=== Operational use ===
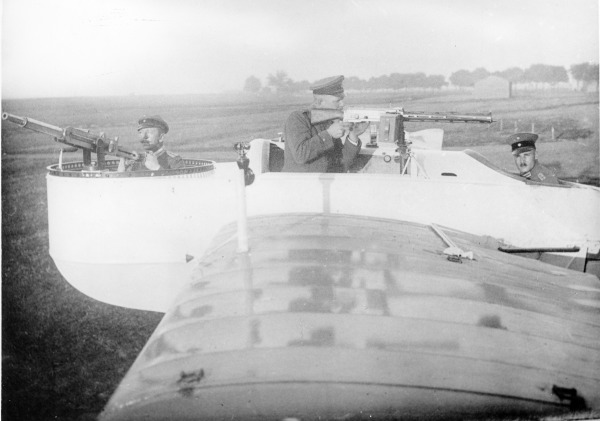
Oskar Ursinus operated a 20 mm Becker cannon in the front cockpit of a Gotha G.I

The main types to use the Type M2 were large, twin-engined aircraft, initially of IdFlieg's "G"-class Grossflugzeug category: the Friedrichshafen G.III bomber and AEG G.IVk ground-attack machine. Tests in smaller, single-engined aircraft were not so successful but were carried out extensively through the rest of the war, commencing with an Albatros J.I in December 1917. Due to the gun's operating principles, it could not be synchronised and this posed an immediate problem for its installation in this type of aircraft. The solution adopted after the tests with the Albatros J.I was to mount the gun at an angle to fire downwards. Fitting the gun to a fighter with a pusher configuration was another obvious solution and trials were carried out with an Albatros D.VI. Other intended installations were for an AGO S.I and the Hansa (Caspar) D.I, but these were not carried out before the armistice. Some rigid airships of the Imperial German Navy, such as the most modern Zeppelin L 70 (LZ 112), were armed with the Becker cannon. Total production figures are not known, but were in excess of 539 (111 by Becker and 428 by MAN); 362 were surrendered to the Allies.

=== Postwar use and patterns ===
The patent for the gun was bought by SEMAG (Seebach Maschinenbau Aktiengesellschaft) in 1921, which continued development with a more powerful cartridge as the SEMAG L. After the collapse of SEMAG, Oerlikon took over the SEMAG assets in 1924, marketing improved versions as the Oerlikon F, Oerlikon L, and Oerlikon S. Bolivia bought eight 20 mm SEMAG rifles. During the Chaco War, seven were captured by the Paraguayans.

== Description ==
The Type M2 was a slim weapon working on the principle of advanced primer ignition blowback. It weighed only 30 kg. It was fed by a somewhat awkward, curved box magazine, available in versions that held 10 or 15 rounds; the latter weighed another 5 kg. As the rate of fire was 325 rounds per minute, this magazine could be emptied very quickly. The muzzle velocity was 490 m/s, which was low compared to the rifle-calibre machine guns of the period such as the German MG 08, but a respectable performance compared to other autocannon of the period, such as the Vickers QF 1 pounder pom-pom.

== Applications ==
- AEG G.IV
- AEG J.II
- AGO S.I
- Albatros D.II
- Albatros D.VI
- Albatros J.I
- Caspar D.I
- Friedrichshafen G.I
- Gotha G.I
- LVG C.V

== Competing German designs ==
During World War I, at least two other German 20 mm autocannons were designed and had limited production. One was the 2cm Ehrhardt; the other was the 19 mm (sometimes reported as 20 mm) Szakats.

== See also ==
- List of API blowback firearms
- MG FF cannon-the final German World War II development of the Becker design
