= Gotha G.II =

German heavy bomber biplane

G.II
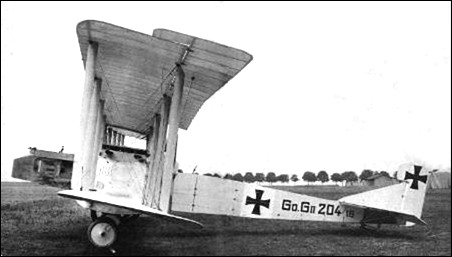

General information
- Type: Bomber
- Manufacturer: Gothaer Waggonfabrik AG
- Designer: Hans Burkhard
- Primary user: Luftstreitkräfte
- Number built: 11

History
- First flight: March 1916
- Variant: Gotha G.III

The Gotha G.II series was a heavy bomber used by the Luftstreitkräfte (Imperial German Air Service) during World War I.

== Design and development ==
The Gotha G.II was an entirely new biplane designed by Hans Burkhard, who had previously reworked Oskar Ursinus's design for the G.I to make it suitable for mass-production. Burkhard abandoned the G.I's unorthodox configuration in favor of a more conventional design with the fuselage mounted on the bottom wing rather than the top. In deciding this, he had the benefit of greater pilot experience to draw upon. The difficulties of asymmetric thrust created by losing an engine on a twin-engine design had proved to be not nearly as bad as Ursinus had originally believed, and therefore the G.I's unusual design was really an answer to a non-existent problem. Furthermore, Burkhard had the opportunity to rebuild a crashed G.I (serial number 9/15) and re-arrange its components to place the fuselage on the lower wing, and found this design workable, while also removing the grave danger to the crew that landing accidents posed.

The G.II carried a crew of three and a defensive armament of two 7.92 mm (.312 in) machine guns. The forward section of the fuselage was skinned in plywood, with the remainder covered in fabric. The fuselage and two very large nacelles were mounted on the lower wing. Each nacelle contained fuel and oil tanks beneath each of a pair of geared-output 160 KW (220 hp) Mercedes D.IV straight-eight engines, one per nacelle, driving pusher propellers. The undercarriage was unusual, being quadricycle in arrangement with a pair of wheels mounted at the front and rear of each engine nacelle. This feature was intended to remove the possibility of a nose-over on landing. In fact, the nacelles and undercarriage constituted fully self-contained, wheeled units intended to facilitate construction and maintenance. The entire aircraft was intended to be easily dismantled so that fuselage, engines, and wings would easily fit onto three railway flatcars.

The G.II prototype first flew in March 1916, and testing revealed several shortcomings. The most significant problem was that the aircraft was not capable of carrying the bombload that was specified by the Idflieg. This was solved by a redesign of the wing cellule to extend its span. At the same time, it was changed from a two-bay to a three-bay structure. The second issue was that the undercarriage arrangement made for very long and uncontrollable landing rolls. This was solved by changing it to a conventional tailskid configuration. Other revisions included horn-balanced ailerons and a triangular vertical fin. In this configuration, production commenced in April 1916.

== Operational history ==
The G.II entered operational service in August 1916, with eight of the initial production batch of 10 deployed to the Balkan front. Of the two others, one remained with Gothaer and the other was severely damaged in an accident during evaluation. Nothing today is known about the type's performance in combat, but of the eight on active service, no more than four appear to have been operational at any one time (October 1916). By February 1917, this number had dwindled to one aircraft only, and from April none remained in service. Part of the problem no doubt lay with their engines. The Mercedes D.IV was plagued by severe crankshaft vibration that resulted in frequent crankshaft failures.

== Operators ==
Data from:Gotha!

- German Empire
  - Kampfgeschwader 4, Staffel 20

== Specifications (G.II) ==
Data from Profile no.115 : The Gotha GI-GV, German Aircraft of the First World War, Gotha!

General characteristics

- Crew: 3
- Length: 12.2 m (40 ft 0 in)
- Upper wingspan: 21.9 m (71 ft 10 in)
- Lower wingspan: 23.7 m (77 ft 9 in)
- Height: 3.9 m (12 ft 10 in)
- Wing area: 89.5 m^{2} (963 sq ft)
- Empty weight: 2,182 kg (4,810 lb)
- Max takeoff weight: 3,192 kg (7,037 lb)
- Powerplant: 1 × Mercedes D.IV 8-cylinder liquid-cooled geared in-line piston engine, 160 kW (220 hp)
- Propellers: 2 or 4-bladed fixed-pitch pusher propellers

Performance

- Maximum speed: 135 km/h (84 mph, 73 kn)
- Endurance: 4 hours
- Rate of climb: 1.8 m/s (350 ft/min)
- Time to altitude: 3,000 m (9,800 ft) in 28 minutes

4,000 m (13,000 ft) in 41 minutes

Armament

- Guns: 2 × 7.92 mm (0.312 in) Parabellum MG14 machine guns
- Bombs: 14x 10 kg (22 lb) bombs

== See also ==
- Gotha Raids

Related development

- Gotha G.I
- Gotha G.III
- Gotha G.IV
- Gotha G.V
- Gotha G.VI

Aircraft of comparable role, configuration, and era

- AEG G.I, G.II, G.III, G.IV
- Airco DH.3
- Friedrichshafen G.II

Related lists

- List of military aircraft of Germany
- List of bomber aircraft
