= Gotha G.IV =

German heavy bomber during World War I

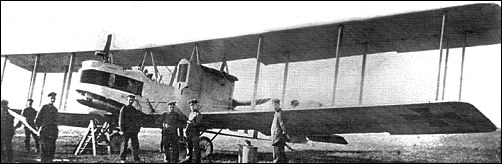

General information
- Type: Bomber
- Manufacturer: Gothaer Waggonfabrik; Siemens-Schuckert Werke; Luft-Verkehrs-Gesellschaft
- Designer: Hans Burkhard
- Primary user: Luftstreitkräfte
- Number built: 230

History
- Manufactured: 1916 to 1917
- Introduction date: March 1917
- First flight: 1916
- Developed from: Gotha G.III
- Variant: Gotha G.V

The Gotha G.IV was a heavy bomber used by the Luftstreitkräfte (Imperial German Air Service) during World War I. It was the first mass-produced relatively large airplane.

== Development ==
Experience with the earlier G.III showed that the rear gunner could not efficiently operate both the dorsal and ventral positions. Hans Burkhard's solution was the Gotha tunnel, a trough connecting an aperture in the upper decking with a large, triangular cross-section opening extending from the wing's trailing edge rearwards along the bottom of the rear fuselage. The Gotha tunnel allowed the dorsal gun to fire through the fuselage at targets below and behind the bomber. A ventral 7.92 mm (.312 in) machine gun could still be mounted, and there was provision for a fourth machine gun on a post between the pilot's and bombardier's cockpits, although this was rarely carried due to the weight penalty. The G.IV introduced other changes. The fuselage was fully skinned in plywood, eliminating the partial fabric covering of the G.III. Although it was not the reason for this modification, it was noted at the time that the plywood skinning enabled the fuselage to float for some time in the event of a water landing. Complaints of poor lateral control, particularly on landing, led to the addition of ailerons on the lower wing.

== Production ==
In November 1916, Gothaer Waggonfabrik received a production order for 35 aircraft: this was subsequently increased to 50 in February 1917. A further 80 aircraft were ordered from Siemens-Schuckert Werke (SSW) and 100 from Luft-Verkehrs-Gesellschaft (LVG). Compared to the Gothaer aircraft, these licence-built aircraft were slightly heavier and slower, because Idflieg specified the use of a strengthened airframe. To counteract this, SSW built a number of highly modified examples, including one driven by tractor instead of pusher engines, one with an extra bay added to its wing cellule, two with a new airfoil section for the wings and one with a supercharger; none of these modifications had been fully evaluated by the end of the war. Late-production SSW G.IVs also usually incorporated the Stossfahrgestell auxiliary nose-wheels and Flettner servo tabs developed for the G.V. Responding to a different problem, LVG overcame the tail heaviness of its machines by increasing the sweep-back of the wings. Late production by SSW and LVG became obsolete, hence many aircraft were finished as trainers with lower performance engines (Argus As.III or NAG C.III). The SSW-built trainers relocated the fuel tanks from the engine nacelles to within the fuselage, as on the G.V.

== Operational history ==
In March 1917, the G.IV entered service with Kagohl 1, which was renamed Kagohl 3 upon receipt of the new machines; the G.IVs were soon to be put to use in Unternehmen Türkenkreuz - the strategic bombing of London. This was delayed when practice missions revealed faulty engine bearings that had to be replaced and that the prevailing winds were stronger than expected, requiring the addition of extra fuel tanks. It was found that the design of the fuel system prevented the main tanks completely from emptying and this problem had to be addressed as well. Around 30 LVG-built G.IVs were fitted with Hiero engines and 8 mm (.315 in) Schwarzlose machine guns for Austro-Hungarian service. Another one was experimentally fitted with a 20 mm Becker cannon for ground attack. Gothas were used in German strategic bombing during the war.

=== Postwar decommission ===
All surviving Gotha aircraft were destroyed in accordance with the terms of the Treaty of Versailles. The sole known exception was one Gotha G.IV in Polish possession.

== Operators ==
- Germany
  - Luftstreitkräfte
- Austria-Hungary
  - KuKLFT
- Netherlands
  - Royal Netherlands Air Force

Only one G.IV, forced landing on 18 August 1917 at Nieuweschans, Groningen, due to destruction of one of the propellers over the Tutjeshut. The aircraft was repaired, only to crash on the first test flight two months later in Soesterberg. Written off from register 1919, Dutch number LA-50 (1917 allocation) and G-700 (1918).

- Poland
  - Polish Air Force

The single operational G.IV (no. 213/17, later 100/17) was captured by Polish forces during the Greater Poland Uprising in 1919. Once repaired, the aircraft joined the 21. Eskadra Niszczycielska (21st Destroyer Squadron) on 30 April 1920. After brief operational use in the Polish–Soviet War between 20 May and 2 August 1920, the aircraft was damaged on 31 August 1920 and withdrawn from service. Another G.IV (606/16) was given to Poland in 1921 as a reparation, but was not used in action.

== Specifications (early Gotha-built examples) ==
General characteristics

- Crew: 3 (pilot, nose gunner, dorsal gunner)
- Length: 12.2 m (40 ft 0 in)
- Wingspan: 23.7 m (77 ft 9 in)
- Height: 3.9 m (12 ft 10 in)
- Wing area: 89.5 m^{2} (963 sq ft)
- Empty weight: 2,413 kg (5,320 lb)
- Gross weight: 3,648 kg (8,042 lb)
- Powerplant: 2 × Mercedes D.IVa , 193 kW (260 hp) each

Performance

- Maximum speed: 135 km/h (83 mph, 72 kn)
- Range: 810 km (506 mi, 440 nmi)
- Endurance: 6 hours
- Service ceiling: 5,000 m (16,400 ft)

Armament

- 2 or 3 × 7.92 mm Parabellum LMG 14 machine guns
- Up to 500 kg (1,100 lb) of bombs

== See also ==
- Gotha raids

Related development

- Gotha G.II
- Gotha G.III
- Gotha G.V
- Gotha G.VI

Aircraft of comparable role, configuration, and era

- AEG G.III, G.IV
- Friedrichshafen G.II, G.III

Related lists

- List of military aircraft of Germany
- List of bomber aircraft

== Bibliography ==
- Grosz, P. M. (1966). The Gotha GI–GV. Profile publications, 115. Leatherhead: Profile Publications. OCLC 918140838.
- Grosz, P. M.; Rimell, R. L. (1994). Gotha!. Berkhamstead: Albatros Productions. ISBN 978-0-948414-57-2.
- Hallade, Jean (December 1977). "Quand les Gothas bombardaient Paris..." [When the Gothas Bombed Paris...]. Le Fana de l'Aviation (in French) (97). Paris: Editions Larivière: 28–30. ISSN 0757-4169.
- Herris, Jack (2013). Gotha Aircraft of WWI: A Centennial Perspective on Great War Airplanes. Great War Aviation Centennial Series. Vol. 6. Charleston, South Carolina: Aeronaut Books. ISBN 978-1-935881-14-8.
