= Gotha G.III =

German WWI era aircraft

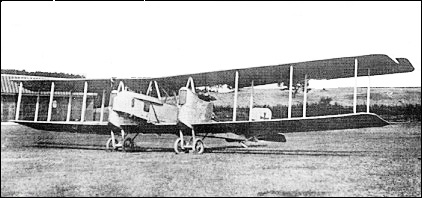

General information
- Type: Bomber
- Manufacturer: Gothaer Waggonfabrik
- Designer: Hans Burkhard
- Status: retired
- Primary user: Luftstreitkräfte
- Number built: 25

History
- Manufactured: 1916
- Introduction date: 1916
- First flight: 1916
- Developed from: Gotha G.II
- Variant: Gotha G.IV

The Gotha G.III was a twin-engine pusher biplane heavy bomber used by the Luftstreitkräfte (Imperial German Air Service) during World War I. It succeeded the G.II in production and differed primarily in powerplant and in armament details. The G.II's unreliable Mercedes D.IV was replaced by the new inline six-cylinder 190 kW (250 hp) Mercedes D.IVa engine. The G.III also had an extra 7.92 mm (0.312 in) machine gun firing through a ventral gun opening to protect the underside of the tail.

== Operational history ==
Most of the 25 G.III aircraft produced were delivered to Kampfgeschwader der Obersten Heeresleitung (Kagohl) 1, operating in the Balkans out of Hudova which were under direct control of the Oberste Heeresleitung high command of the German Army. Combat service of the G.III was limited and its most notable accomplishment was in September 1916, when a formation of G.IIIs destroyed a railway bridge over the Danube River at Cernavodă, Romania. It also saw use by Kagohl 2 on the Western Front, operating from Freiburg. Following the delivery of the G.IIIs to this unit, its commander complained to Berlin about the performance of the aircraft because they were outrunning their escort fighters. In September 1917, surviving aircraft were relegated to training units.

== Operators ==
German Empire

- Luftstreitkräfte

== Specifications ==
General characteristics

- Crew: Three
- Length: 12.2 m (40 ft 0 in)
- Wingspan: 23.7 m (77 ft 9 in)
- Height: 3.9 m (12 ft 10 in)
- Wing area: 89.5 m^{2} (963 sq ft)
- Empty weight: 2,383 kg (5,254 lb)
- Gross weight: 3,618 kg (7,976 lb)
- Powerplant: 2 × Mercedes D.IVa , 193 kW (260 hp) each

Performance

- Maximum speed: 135 km/h (84 mph, 73 kn)
- Endurance: 3 hours 45 minutes

Armament

- 2 to 3 × 7.92 mm (0.312 in) Parabellum MG14 machine guns
- 500 kg (1,100 lb) of bombs

== See also ==
- Gotha Raids

Related development

- Gotha G.II
- Gotha G.IV
- Gotha G.V
- Gotha G.VI

Aircraft of comparable role, configuration, and era

- AEG G.II, G.III, G.IV
- Airco DH.3
- Friedrichshafen G.II
- Handley Page Type O
- Letord Let.5
- Sikorsky Ilya Muromets

Related lists

- List of military aircraft of Germany
- List of bomber aircraft
