= Friedrichshafen G.I =

G.I
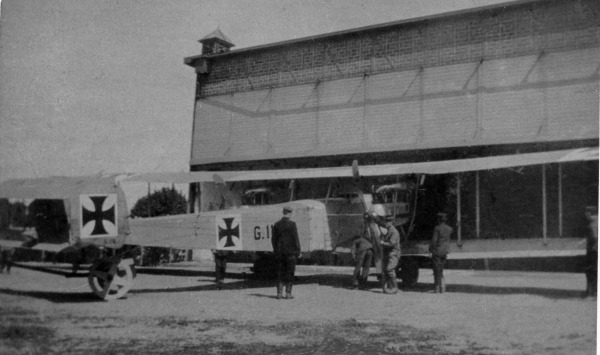

General information
- Type: Battleplane
- Manufacturer: Flugzeugbau Friedrichshafen GmbH
- Primary user: Luftstreitkräfte
- Number built: 1

History
- First flight: 1915
- Developed into: Friedrichshafen G.II

The Friedrichshafen G.I (factory designation FF.36) was a prototype biplane aircraft that was built in Germany by Flugzeugbau Friedrichshafen during the First World War for the Imperial German Army's (Deutsches Heer) Imperial German Air Service (Fliegertruppen des deutschen Kaiserreiches). Only one aircraft was built in 1915, but it proved successful enough that it was approved for further development into a medium bomber, the G.II.

== Development ==
The G.I was conceived as a battleplane or aerial cruiser that was to be capable of engaging enemy aircraft with its flexible machine guns or cannon as well as attacking ground targets. The Imperial German Air Service's Inspectorate of Flying Troops (Inspektion der Fliegertruppen (Idflieg) issued a requirement in July 1914 for a three-man battleplane with enough fuel to fly for six hours, a flexible gun for the aerial observer in the nose, the ability to lift a useful load of 450 kilograms (990 lb) and an engine with a minimum of 200 metric horsepower (150 kW).

No engine that powerful was available in Germany, so designer Theodore Kober had to use two engines, choosing the 150-metric-horsepower (110 kW) Benz Bz.III engine in a pusher configuration. The water-cooled straight-six engines were housed in nacelles were suspended between the three-bay wings by a system of struts. Above each nacelle was a frontal radiator suspended from the upper wing. Each engine drove a fixed-pitch, wooden two-blade propeller. The G.I's structure was built in the company's usual fashion from wire-braced wood covered by doped fabric. The aircraft's biplane tail structure consisted of two horizontal stabilizers and a single vertical stabilizer in the middle; at the tips of the horizontal stabilizers were the rudders forming a box shape. In the fuselage the pilot's cockpit was located underneath the upper wing and in front of him were positions for two observers; the observer in the nose was provided with a 7.92 mm (0.312 in) Parabellum MG14 machine gun.

Fight testing revealed that the G.I was underpowered, but it proved to be fundamentally sound and Idflieg ordered six improved versions in late 1915, but the design emphasis was shifted to the bomber role when the wartime experience proved the battleplane concept unworkable.

== Specifications (G.I) ==
Data from Flugzeugbau Friedrichshafen GmbH: Diplom-Ingenieur Theodor Kober

General characteristics

- Crew: 3
- Length: 11.9 m (39 ft 1 in)
- Wingspan: 21.2 m (69 ft 7 in)
- Height: 3.15 m (10 ft 4 in)
- Wing area: 73.5 m^{2} (791 sq ft)
- Empty weight: 1,778 kg (3,920 lb)
- Gross weight: 2,785 kg (6,140 lb)
- Powerplant: 2 × Benz Bz.III water-cooled straight-six piston engine, 110 kW (150 hp) each
- Propellers: 2-bladed pusher propellers

Performance

- Maximum speed: 136 km/h (85 mph, 73 kn)
- Range: 610 km (380 mi, 330 nmi)

Armament

- Guns: 1 × 7.92 mm (0.312 in) Parabellum MG14 machine gun
- Bombs: 200 kg (440 lb) of bombs

== See also ==
- Idflieg aircraft designation system

Related development

- Friedrichshafen G.II
- Friedrichshafen G.III
- Friedrichshafen G.IV & V

Aircraft of comparable role, configuration, and era

- AEG G.I, G.II
- Gotha G.I

== Bibliography ==
- Borzutzki, Siegfried (1993). Flugzeugbau Friedrichshafen GmbH: Diplom-Ingenieur Theodor Kober [Friedrichshafen Aircraft Company: Diploma-Engineer Theodore Kober] (in German). Berlin: Burbach. ISBN 3-927513-60-1.
- Grosz, Peter M. (2000). Gotha G.I. Windsock Datafile. Vol. 83. Berkhamsted, UK: Albatros Productions. ISBN 1-902207-25-4.
- Herris, Jack (2014). Rumpler Aircraft of WWI: A Centennial Perspective on Great War Airplanes. Great War Aviation Centennial Series. Vol. 11. n.p.: Aeronaut Books. ISBN 978-1-935881-21-6.
- Herris, Jack (2015). A.E.G. Aircraft of WWI: A Centennial Perspective on Great War Airplanes. Great War Aviation Centennial Series. Vol. 16. n. p.: Aeronaut Books. ISBN 978-1-935881-28-5.
- Herris, Jack (2016). Friedrichshafen Aircraft of WWI: A Centennial Perspective on Great War Airplanes. Great War Aviation Centennial Series. Vol. 21. Charleston, South Carolina: Aeronaut Books. ISBN 978-1-935881-35-3.
