= AEG G.IV =

1916 heavy bomber aircraft model by AEG

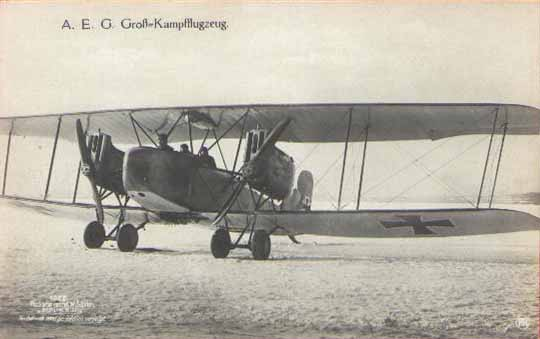
- AEG G.IV (wartime photo)

General information
- Type: Bomber aircraft
- Manufacturer: Allgemeine Elektricitäts-Gesellschaft (A.E.G.)
- Primary user: Luftstreitkräfte (Imperial German Army Air Service)
- Number built: 320

History
- Introduction date: 1916
- First flight: 1916
- Retired: 1918
- Developed from: AEG G.III
- Developed into: AEG G.V

The AEG G.IV was a biplane bomber aircraft designed and produced by the German aircraft manufacturer Allgemeine Elektrizitäts-Gesellschaft. It saw action during the First World War with the Luftstreitkräfte (Imperial German Army Air Service).

The G.IV was developed from the AEG G.III, featuring various refinements to power, bomb-load, and dimensions; specifically, it featured double the bomb capacity of the AEG G.II. Introduced to service during late 1916, the G.IV managed to achieve some operational success in both reconnaissance and direct combat missions. Because of its relatively short range, the G.IV served mainly as a tactical bomber, thus it operated close to the front lines. It initially flew both day and night operations in France, Romania, Greece, and Italy, but was increasingly restricted to night missions as the conflict progressed. Many night operations were considered nuisance raids, conducting without any specific targets other than the intention of disrupting enemy activity at night and achieving some collateral damage at best.

Some officials concluded that the G.IV was still inadequate in terms of offensive capacity and performance, thus further improvements were sought. A single specialised G.IV was converted into an armored, antitank gunship, the G.IVk (Kanone) with two 20 mm Becker cannon, but it did not see action. The G.IV was the last in the series to see action, as while development of the improved G.V did proceed, the Armistice of 1918 that brought an end to the combat came into effect before this successor could become operational.

== Design and development ==
The Allgemeine Elektricitäts-Gesellschaft (AEG) G.IV was derived from the earlier G.III; according to the aviation historians Peter Gray and Owen Thetford, it was only a slight refinement of its predecessor. Designed from the onset to operate as a tactical bomber, the designers opted to incorporate various relatively modern technologies of the era, including onboard radios and electrically heated suits for the crew.

Unlike the other German twin-engined Großflugzeug-class ("G") bombers, such as the Gotha G.V and the Friedrichshafen G.III, the G.IV featured an all-metal, welded-tube frame that made the aircraft considerably more durable than most of its contemporaries. (Note: Multiple photos of AEG crashes have depicted the wings having crumpled while the crew compartments stayed intact, allowing the crew to walk away from the crash in many cases.) This design choice resulted in a relatively high structural weight despite its compact size for a twin-engined aircraft. The fuselage was constructed as one complete unit, instead of using subassemblies. In addition to the fuselage, the tail unit also made use of steel-tube construction. Aside from plywood paneling on the nose, the exterior was covered by fabric. The tail unit featured a particularly tall rudder, which necessitated unconventional bracing to the upper longeron; the tail fins also featured a relatively unorthodox high camber.

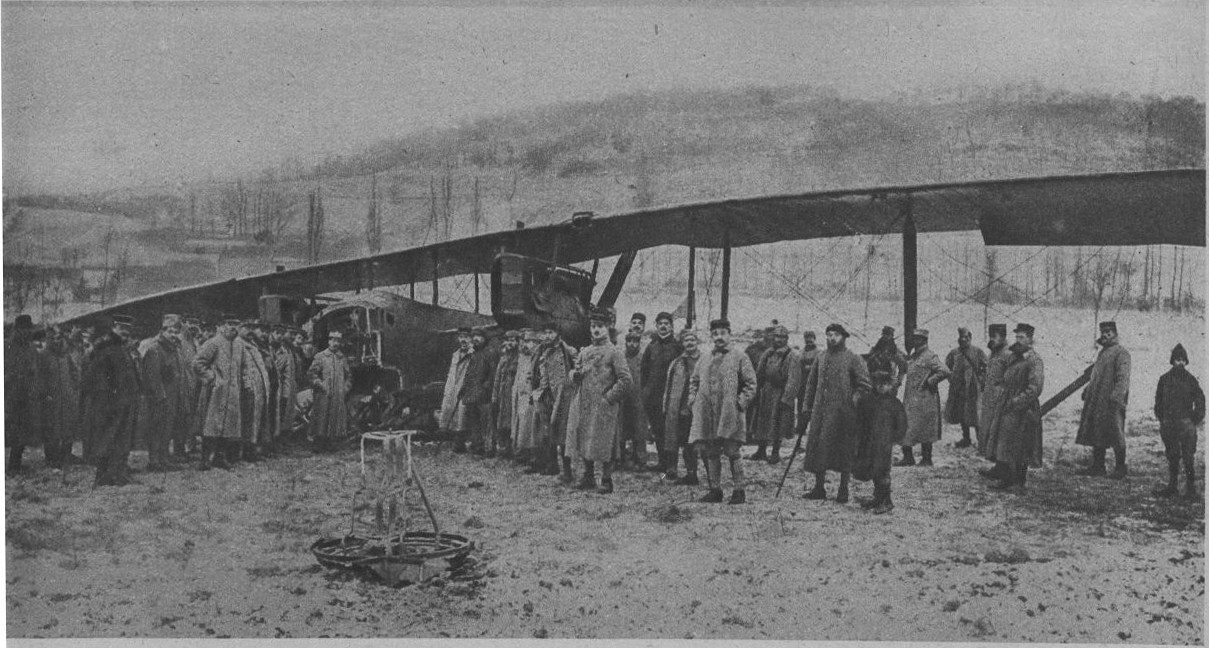
A crashed AEG G.IV, 23 December 1917

The G.IV was powered by a pair of Mercedes D.IVa six-cylinder, water-cooled, inline, piston engines; cooling was provided via automotive-type radiators positioned immediately aft of the propellers. These engines were mounted by a complex array of steel struts to the lower wing spars and braced against the upper longerons of the fuselage; somewhat unusually, no connecting struts were between the engine and the upper wing. The wings comprised a fixed central section with detachable swept outer panels of composite construction, that being a pair of 50 mm diameter steel-tube spars and solid wood ribs. To lighten the wing structure, strategically placed holes were drilled, and besides loose threading, no solid connections between the ribs and the spars were made; several of the ribs were also false. The upper wing featured large balanced ailerons that shared a similar profile to that of the AEG C.IV. The undercarriage comprised a relatively sturdy tailskid and a pair of wheels, each one mounted directly beneath each engine and equipped with shock absorbers.

The G.IV was relatively well equipped in terms of armament, being capable of carrying a warload of 400 kg (880 lb). At the port side of the rear cockpit were a pair of tracks for carrying 25 lb bombs, an additional bomb rack was fitted between the rear and forward cockpits underneath the floor. Provisions for the carriage of up to five 50 lb bombs, one underneath each wing and up to three beneath the fuselage, were also made Bomb release was controlled from the forward cockpit. The G.IV was typically flown by a three-man crew, although a fourth could be readily accommodated when required. The rear gunner's cockpit was located on the top of the fuselage, being equipped with a hinged window in the floor for viewing and fending off pursuing aircraft. When suitably configured, dual flight controls (with the notable exception of the ailerons) could be furnished, although this facility was of limited use outside of emergencies.

Several experimental modifications were made to the G.IV. A version with increased span and three bay struts, the G.IVb, is known to have been built. Furthermore, the aircraft was also converted into an armored, antitank gunship, the G.IVk (Kanone) with two 20 mm Becker cannon, but this model is believed to have never entered service.

== Operational history ==
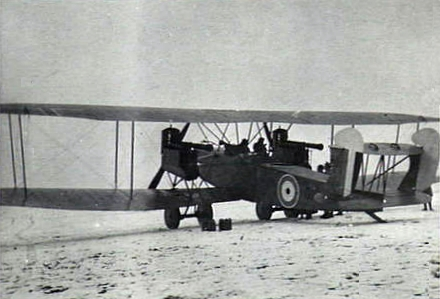
A captured AEG G.IVk in British markings, Bickendorf, 1919 Occupation of the Rhineland

The G.IV entered service with the German Air Force in late 1916. Even at the start of its career, its performance in several metrics was inferior to that of contemporary Gothas, including range and payload capacity, despite typically sharing the same Mercedes D.IVa engine. However, while Gotha crews struggled to keep their heavy aircraft aloft, the G.IV was regarded as being a relatively easy aircraft to fly. In light of its relatively small payload when fully fueled, missions typically undertaken by the type were short range, thus permitting more munitions to be carried at the expense of fuel. On occasion, it was flown without any offensive payload to perform aerial reconnaissance flights.

The G.IV performed both day- and night-time bombing missions, often targeting areas to the rear of the contact line. Some crews of Kampfgeschwader 4 are reputed to have flown up to seven combat missions per night on the Italian front. One notable mission conducted by a G.IV, piloted by Hauptmann Hermann Köhl, was conducted against the railway sheds in Padua, Italy.

By August 1918, around 50 aircraft are believed to have been still active with the German Air Force. The G.IV continued to be used operationally by Germans through to the Armistice of 11 November 1918 that ended the conflict. Soon, the British Army of Occupation of the Rhineland took over.

== Survivor ==
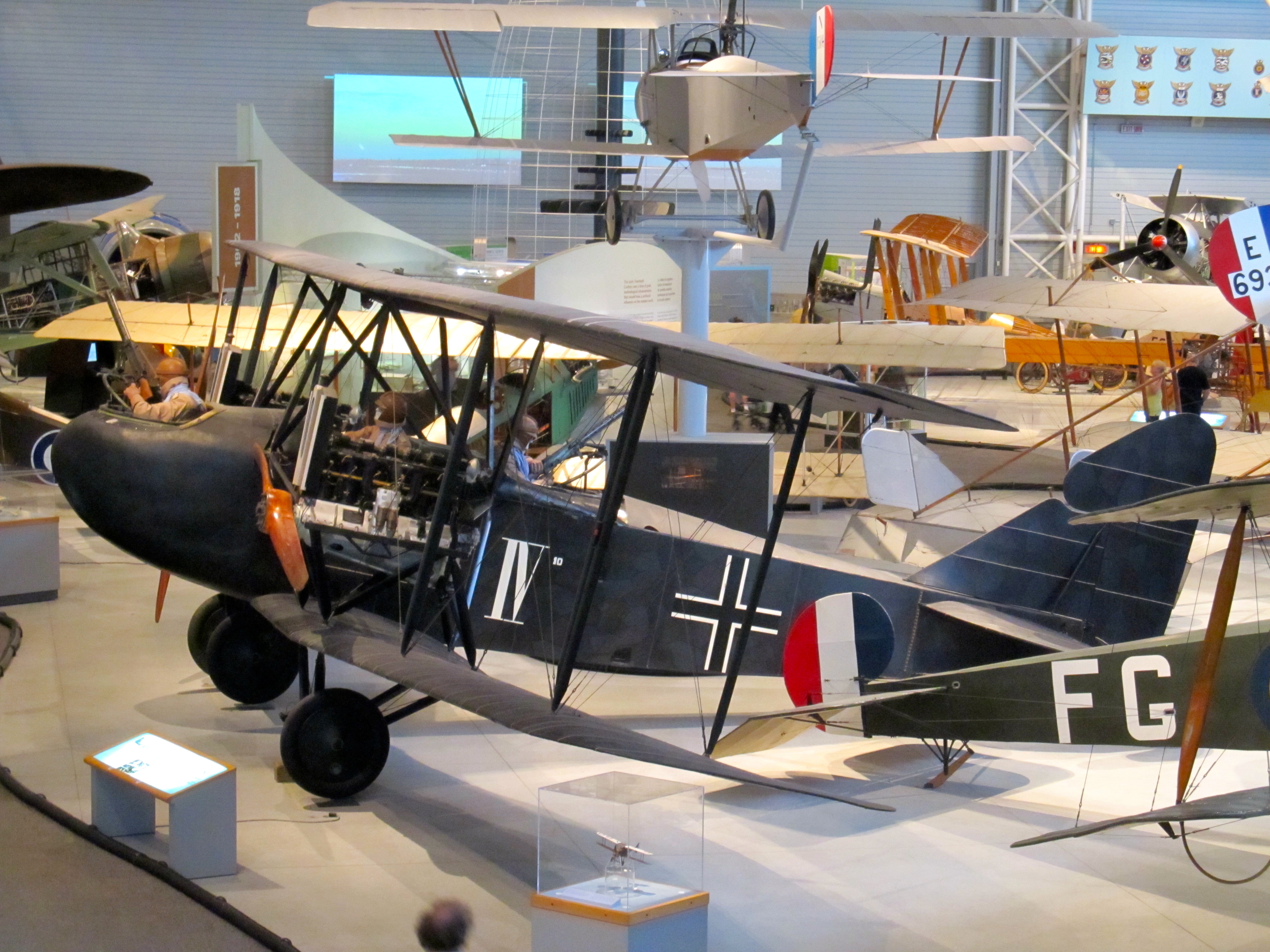
AEG G.IV at Canada Aviation and Space Museum

A single example (number 574/18) is preserved at the Canada Aviation and Space Museum. This example is significant not only as the only one of its kind in existence, but also as the only preserved German, twin-engined combat aircraft from the First World War. The aircraft was brought to Canada in 1919 as a war trophy and has been at the museum since 1970.

== Variants ==
AEG G.IV
Tactical bomber
AEG G.IVg
Fitted with an increased span three-bay wing.
AEG G.IVk
Armoured ground-attack aircraft fitted with two 20 mm Becker cannon, one in a dorsal mounting and one in a turret under the nose. Five built.

== Operators ==
German Empire

- Luftstreitkräfte

== Specifications (AEG G.IV) ==
Data from German Aircraft of the First World War

General characteristics

- Crew: 3
- Length: 9.7 m (31 ft 10 in)
- Wingspan: 18.4 m (60 ft 4 in)
- Height: 3.9 m (12 ft 10 in)
- Wing area: 67 m^{2} (720 sq ft)
- Empty weight: 2,400 kg (5,291 lb)
- Gross weight: 3,630 kg (8,003 lb)
- Fuel capacity: 560 L (150 US gal; 120 imp gal)
- Powerplant: 2 × Mercedes D.IVa six-cylinder water-cooled inline piston engine, 194 kW (260 hp) each
- Propellers: 2-bladed wooden fixed pitch tractor propellers

Performance

- Maximum speed: 165 km/h (103 mph, 89 kn)
- Endurance: four–five hours in cruise
- Service ceiling: 4,500 m (14,800 ft)
- Time to altitude: 1,000 m (3,300 ft) in five minutes
- Wing loading: 54.2 kg/m^{2} (11.1 lb/sq ft)
- Power/mass: 0.0986 kW/kg (0.0601 hp/lb)

Armament

- Guns: 2 × 7.92 mm (0.312 in) Parabellum machine guns
- Bombs: 400 kg (880 lb) of bombs

== See also ==
Related development

- AEG G.I
- AEG G.II
- AEG G.III
- AEG G.V

Aircraft of comparable role, configuration, and era

- Friedrichshafen G.II
- Gotha G.II, G.III, G.IV, G.V

Related lists

- List of military aircraft of Germany
- List of bomber aircraft
