= AGO S.I =

S.I
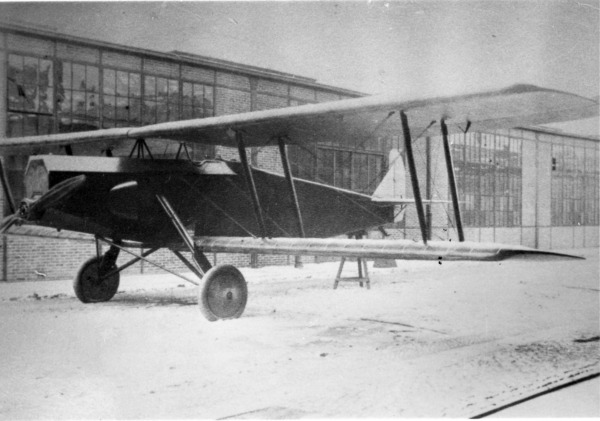

General information
- Type: Ground attack aircraft
- Manufacturer: AGO Flugzeugwerke
- Number built: 2

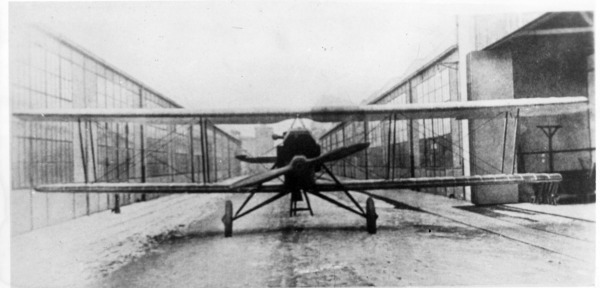
AGO S.I front

The AGO S.I was a German prototype ground-attack aircraft built in October 1918 but possibly never flown before the end of World War I. It was a single-seat biplane armed with a downwards-firing 20 mm cannon.

== Specifications ==
General characteristics

- Crew: one, pilot
- Powerplant: 1 × Basse und Selve BuS.III , 113 kW (150 hp)

Performance Armament

- 2 × machine guns
- 1 × 20 mm Becker cannon
