= Albatros D.VI =

1917 fighter biplane prototype model

D.VI

General information
- Type: Fighter
- National origin: Germany
- Manufacturer: Albatros Flugzeugwerke
- Number built: 1

Albatros D.VI was the designation given to a prototype single-seat twin-boom pusher biplane built in 1917 in Germany. It was armed with a fixed 7.92 mm (0.312 in) LMG 08/15 machine gun and a fixed 20 mm (0.787 in) Becker Type M2 cannon.

The aircraft's undercarriage was damaged on landing from its maiden flight in February 1918 and was never repaired, the project being abandoned in May of that year due to other projects of higher priority. The 130 kW (170 hp) Mercedes D.IIIa engine was eventually removed for use in a different aircraft.

== Specifications ==
Data from The Complete Book of Fighters

General characteristics

- Crew: 1
- Length: 7.75 m (25 ft 5 in)
- Wingspan: 9.8 m (32 ft 2 in)
- Empty weight: 638 kg (1,406 lb)
- Gross weight: 880 kg (1,940 lb)
- Powerplant: 1 × Daimler D.IIIa , 130 kW (180 hp)

Armament

- 1 × fixed 20 mm (0.787 in) Becker Type M2 20 mm cannon
- 1 × fixed 7.92 mm (0.312 in) LMG 08/15 machine-gun

== Bibliography ==
- Green, W.; Swanborough, G. (2001) [1994]. The Complete Book of Fighters (2nd ed.). London: Salamander Books. ISBN 1-84065-269-1.
