= AEG G.III =

1910s German bomber biplane model

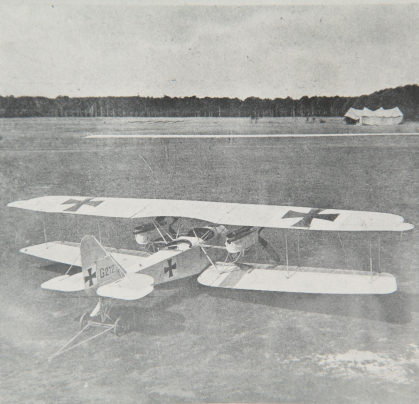

General information
- Type: Bomber
- National origin: German Empire
- Manufacturer: AEG
- Primary user: Luftstreitkräfte
- Number built: 46

History
- Developed from: AEG G.II
- Variant: AEG G.IV

The AEG G.III was a biplane bomber built by the Allgemeine Elektricitäts-Gesellschaft (AEG) during the First World War for the Imperial German Army's (Deutsches Heer) Imperial German Air Service (Luftstreitkräfte). It was an enlarged version of the G.II fitted with more powerful engines for the same battleplane (Kampfflugzeug) or aerial cruiser role escorting bombers or reconnaissance aircraft and engaging enemy aircraft. The prototype was completed in December 1915, but deliveries did not begin until May 1916.

== Development ==
The Inspectorate of Flying Troops (Inspektion der Fliegertruppen (Idflieg) ordered the prototype of the G.III (factory designation GZ3) on 1 April 1915 with the intention of using it as a battleplane like its predecessor. The G.III was to be equipped with a pair of the most powerful engines available and AEG selected the water-cooled 220-horsepower (160 kW) Mercedes D.IV straight-eight piston engine. Other requirements included a crew of three, 200 kg (440 lb) of armor and a bomb load of 240 kg (530 lb). Its defensive armament was to consist of a pair of 7.92 mm (.312 in) machine guns or a cannon in the nose and a dorsal machine gun. The aircraft had to use four-bladed propellers to absorb the power of the engines. These tended to break their crankshafts in service as they were not well supported by bearings.

Idflieg ordered a batch of five G.IIIs on 7 September 1915 before the first prototype was completed in December; one of these was fitted with a triple rudder like the modified G.IIs used for comparison with the single rudder used by the prototype. The single rudder proved to be superior and it was used by all the G.IIIs. Forty more aircraft were ordered in two batches in December 1915 and March 1916. The first three production aircraft were delivered in May and G.IIs were on the front line strength reports the following month. The aircraft equipped Bomber Wing 1 (Kampfgeschwader 1) that operated on the Macedonian Front. The last time that any G.IIIs show up on the bimonthly strength reports was on 30 April 1917.

== Operators ==
German Empire

- Luftstreitkräfte

== Specifications (AEG G.III) ==
Data from German Aircraft of the First World War; A.E.G. Aircraft of WWI: A Centennial Perspective on Great War Airplanes

General characteristics

- Crew: 3 or 4
- Length: 9.2 m (30 ft 2 in)
- Upper wingspan: 18.44 m (60 ft 6 in)
- Lower wingspan: 17.2 m (56 ft 5 in)
- Wing area: 74 m^{2} (800 sq ft)
- Empty weight: 1,940 kg (4,277 lb)
- Gross weight: 2,560 kg (5,644 lb)
- Powerplant: 2 × Mercedes D.IV water-cooled straight-eight piston engine, 160 kW (220 hp) each
- Propellers: 4-bladed

Performance

- Maximum speed: 150 km/h (93 mph, 81 kn)
- Range: 700 km (430 mi, 380 nmi)
- Time to altitude: 6 minutes to 1,000 m (3,300 ft)

Armament

- Guns: 2 × 7.92 mm (.312 in) machine guns
- Bombs: 240 kg (530 lb)

== See also ==
Related development

- AEG G.I
- AEG G.II
- AEG G.IV
- AEG G.V

Aircraft of comparable role, configuration, and era

- Friedrichshafen G.II
- Gotha G.I, G.II, G.III

== Bibliography ==
- Gray, Peter & Thetford, Owen (1987) [1970]. German Aircraft of the First World War (2nd ed.). London: Putnam. ISBN 0-85177-809-7.
- Herris, Jack (2015). A.E.G. Aircraft of WWI: A Centennial Perspective on Great War Airplanes. Great War Aviation Centennial Series. Vol. 16. n. p.: Aeronaut Books. ISBN 978-1-935881-28-5.
