= The Red Fighter Pilot =

Non-fiction book by Manfred von Richthofen

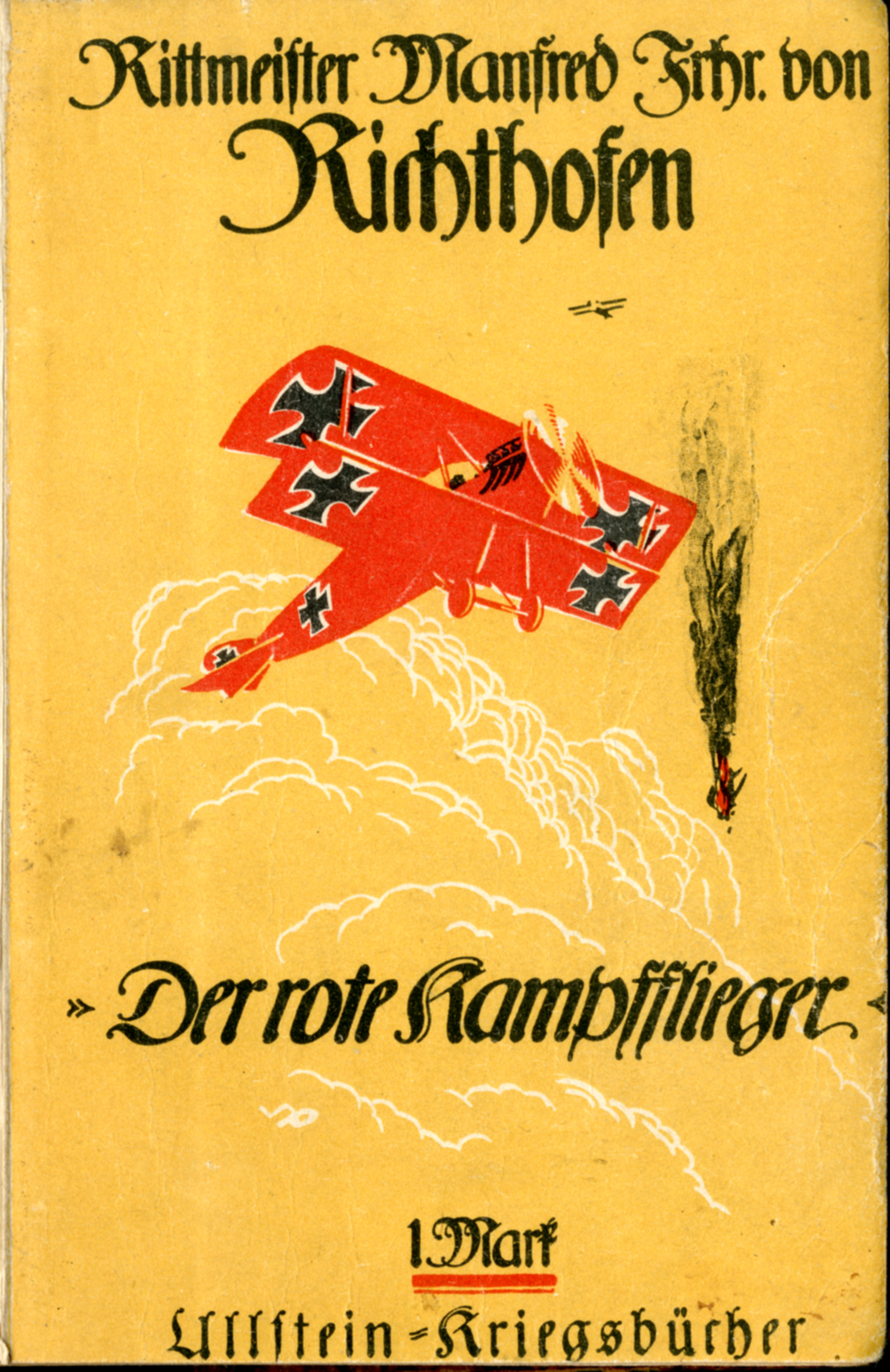
- Author: Manfred von Richthofen
- Original title: Der rote Kampfflieger
- Language: German
- Series: Ullstein Kriegsbücher
- Genre: Non-fiction
- Publication date: 1917, 1920, 1933
- Publication place: Germany

The Red Fighter Pilot (German: Der rote Kampfflieger) is a book written by Manfred von Richthofen, a famous German fighter pilot who is considered the top scoring ace of the First World War, being officially credited with 80 air combat victories. Richthofen's most common German nickname was "Der Rote Kampfflieger," which roughly translates to "The Red Battle Flyer" or "The Red Fighter Pilot." Today he is better known as the Red Baron.

The book details some of Richthofen's experiences during World War I. He finished the book in 1917, and as it was written during World War I, it was subjected to war-time censorship. Richthofen was killed in combat in 1918. The Red Fighter Pilot was the only book he authored. Written on the instructions of the "Press and Intelligence" (propaganda) section of the Luftstreitkräfte, it shows evidence of having been censored and edited. An English translation by J. Ellis Barker was published in 1918 as The Red Battle Flyer.

In 1920, Germany republished the book in a volume called Ein Heldenleben (A Hero's Life). Ein Heldenleben included additional materials written by von Richthofen, including parts of his correspondence. The book also contained materials written by family members and friends about him.

In 1933, Manfred von Richthofen's autobiography was published for the third time in Germany, this time in a volume again titled Der Rote Kampfflieger. Like Ein Heldenleben, this volume includes some writings by others about von Richthofen, the full text of Der Rote Kampfflieger, some of von Richthofen's correspondences, and some autobiographical passages he wrote after the original publication of Der Rote Kampfflieger and before his death. The text of Der Rote Kampfflieger itself contains several inclusions that were censored from the original publication. In 1969, historian Peter Kilduff published an English translation of the 1933 book titled The Red Baron.

The 1933 edition of Der Rote Kampfflieger appears to paint a much more accurate portrait of von Richthofen than the 1917 edition. It contains passages most unlikely to have been inserted by an official editor: "I am in wretched spirits after every aerial combat. I believe that [the war] is not as the people at home imagine it, with a hurrah and a roar; it is very serious, very grim." In this edition von Richthofen also goes on record as repudiating Der Rote Kampfflieger, stating that it was too insolent and that he was no longer that kind of person.
