= AEG G.II =

German bomber biplane

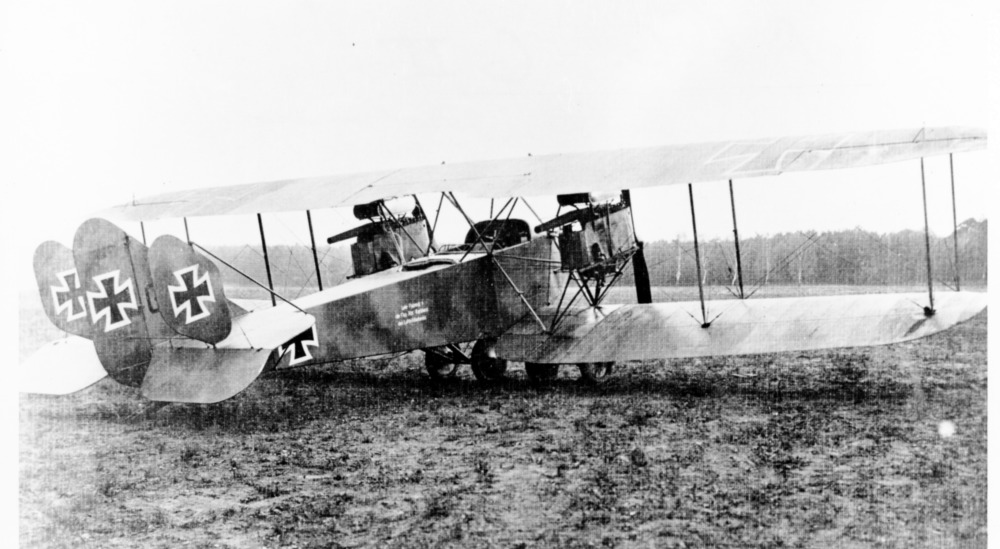

General information
- Type: Bomber
- National origin: German Empire
- Manufacturer: AEG
- Primary user: Luftstreitkräfte
- Number built: 27–28

History
- Introduction date: July 1915
- Developed from: AEG G.I
- Developed into: AEG G.III

The AEG G.II was a biplane bomber built by the Allgemeine Elektricitäts-Gesellschaft (AEG) during the First World War for the Imperial German Army's (Deutsches Heer) Imperial German Air Service (Luftstreitkräfte). It was an improved version of the AEG G.I with more powerful engines. The G.II was typically armed with a pair of 7.92 mm (.312 in) machine guns and 200 kg (440 lb) of bombs. The bomber suffered stability problems, and many G.IIs were fitted with additional rudders to improve flight handling characteristics.

== Development ==
A batch of a six G.IIs (factory designation GZ2) was ordered by the Inspectorate of Flying Troops (Inspektion der Fliegertruppen (Idflieg) on 1 April 1915 before the G.I even began its combat trials. It required the use of water-cooled 150-horsepower (110 kW) Benz Bz.III straight-six piston engines, an armament of a single 7.92 mm (0.312 in) machine gun, a bomb load of 200 kilograms (440 lb) and 150 kg (330 lb) of armor plate with thicknesses ranging from 1.5 to 2.3 mm (0.059 to 0.091 in) for the forward gunner. The crew was to consist of two men, although it was to be equipped with three seats. Idflieg was very concerned about the G.II's ability to fly on a single engine, so AEG lengthened the steel-tube fuselage and enlarged the vertical stabilizer and rudder accordingly. The aircraft was expected to be used in the battleplane (Kampfflugzeug) or aerial cruiser role escorting bombers or reconnaissance aircraft and engaging enemy aircraft. Another batch of a dozen was ordered on 6 May, also before the results of the G.I's combat trials were known.

AEG's measures to insure adequate stability when flying on a single engine proved inadequate so the aircraft from the first batch received a variety of modifications to address the issue. Most had the tail structure modified with the existing vertical stabilizer and rudder enlarged and/or two additional rudders were mounted on the horizontal stabilizers. Some had the blunt armored nose replaced by a more streamlined unarmored one. Aircraft of the second and succeeding batches incorporated these changes as built. Two more batches totaling 18 aircraft were ordered in September, but only three or four of the last batch of a dozen were actually delivered. The highest number of G.IIs on the front-line strength report was 13 in December 1915 and remained in front-line service through June 1917.

Despite the addition of additional machine guns, the battleplane concept proved to be a failure as the G.II was too slow to catch faster and more maneuverable fighters. Idflieg concluded that the G.II: "had fared poorly in air combat, but had been successfully employed as a bomber in squadron strength".

== Specifications (AEG G.II) ==
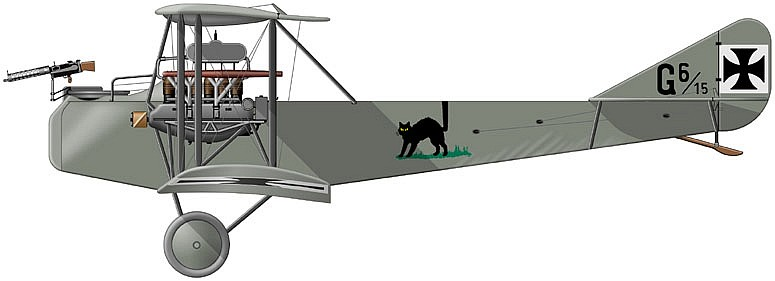
AEG G.II profile

Data from German Aircraft of the First World War; A.E.G. Aircraft of WWI: A Centennial Perspective on Great War Airplanes

General characteristics

- Crew: 3–4
- Length: 9.1 m (29 ft 10 in)
- Upper wingspan: 16.2 m (53 ft 2 in)
- Lower wingspan: 15.2 m (49 ft 10 in)
- Wing area: 61 m^{2} (660 sq ft)
- Empty weight: 1,450 kg (3,197 lb)
- Gross weight: 2,050 kg (4,519 lb)
- Powerplant: 2 × Benz Bz.III water-cooled straight-six piston engine, 110 kW (150 hp) each
- Propellers: 2-bladed

Performance

- Maximum speed: 140 km/h (87 mph, 76 kn)
- Time to altitude: 11 minutes to 1,000 m (3,300 ft)

Armament

- Guns: up to 3 × 7.92 mm (.312 in) machine guns
- Bombs: 200 kg (440 lb) of bombs

== See also ==
Related development

- AEG G.I
- AEG G.III
- AEG G.IV
- AEG G.V

Aircraft of comparable role, configuration, and era

- Caproni Ca.1 (1914)
- Friedrichshafen G.I, G.II
- Gotha G.I, G.II

== Bibliography ==
- Gray, Peter & Thetford, Owen (1987) [1970]. German Aircraft of the First World War (2nd ed.). London: Putnam. ISBN 0-85177-809-7.
- Herris, Jack (2015). A.E.G. Aircraft of WWI: A Centennial Perspective on Great War Airplanes. Great War Aviation Centennial Series. Vol. 16. n. p.: Aeronaut Books. ISBN 978-1-935881-28-5.
