= Kampfgeschwader =

Kampfgeschwader are the German-language name for (air force) bomber units. In WW1, they were air squadrons, while in WW2, they were air wings.

== History ==
=== First World War ===
During World War I, Kampfgeschwader were specialized bomber units in the Luftstreitkräfte.

Formally known as Kampfgeschwader der Obersten Heeresleitung, or Kagohl for short, they were assets directly controlled by the Oberste Heeresleitung, the German Army's high command, rather than by army, corps, or division commanders.

Each Kagohl consisted of a headquarters element and six flights, or Kampfstaffeln, of bomber aircraft.

In 1917, the Kagohls were reorganized into Bombengeschwader der Obersten Heeresleitung (Bogohl) of three Bombenstaffeln (Bosta), each of six heavy bombers and several additional light bombers.

=== Second World War ===
In World War II, Kampfgeschwader units were full bomber wings within the 1935–1945 Luftwaffe, consisting of three or more Kampfgruppe bomber groups, as a part of a typical Luftflotte's medium or heavy bomber strength.

== See also ==
- Geschwader
- Jagdgeschwader
