= Oskar Ursinus =

German aviation pioneer

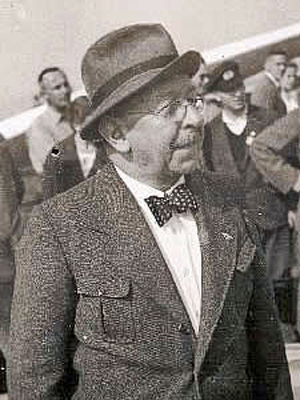
- Oskar Ursinus 1938
- Born: 11 April 1877; Weißenfels, German Empire
- Died: 6 July 1952 (aged 75)
- Known for: remembered mainly for his contributions to sailplane designs and the sport of gliding

Carl Oskar Ursinus (11 March 1877 – 6 July 1952) was a pioneer of German aviation and is remembered mainly for his contributions to sailplane designs and the sport of gliding. He has been nicknamed the Rhönvater ("Rhön father") because he founded Germany’s first gliding club at the Wasserkuppe in the Rhön Mountains in 1920.

Ursinus was born in Weißenfels and attended Technical College in Mittweida. After graduation, he worked for Borsig on compressors for locomotives, and spent some time working on mining machinery in Romania for the firm.

In 1908, back in Germany, Ursinus began to publish a magazine titled Flugsport (“Sports Flying”), since he had become fascinated by the new technology of flight. The magazine helped establish a network among Germany’s aviation enthusiasts, and led to the organisation of Germany’s first international airshow.

He was conscripted into the German Army in 1914 and requested a position in aircraft design. The request was approved and he was posted to Gothaer Waggonfabrik designing warplanes. The famous series of Gotha bombers used by the German air corps throughout World War I, were all based on an Ursinus design of 1915 that was refined and manufactured as the Gotha G.I. Ursinus' real passion, however, was for seaplanes, and in 1916 he designed a seaplane fighter with retractable floats that was unfortunately destroyed before testing was complete.

Following the war, the Treaty of Versailles prohibited Germany from building powered aircraft, and the attention of German aviators therefore turned to gliding. A plateau particularly suited to gliding, the Wasserkuppe, became a focal point for this activity, and in 1920, Ursinus organized a competition there. Twenty-four people attended the meeting between 15 July and 15 September 1920, including Wolf Hirth and other gliding pioneers. (see also Rhön-Rossitten Gesellschaft.)

Over the next decade, this grew in importance to become an international event. Ursinus also constructed the first clubhouse on the Wasserkuppe in 1924. He was pursuing experiments in human-powered flight when the outbreak of World War II intervened.

Following the war, powered flying was once again forbidden in Germany, but Ursinus lived just long enough to see this prohibition lifted.

Today, he is regarded in Germany as the father of gliding, and Germany’s association for homebuilt aircraft, the Oskar Ursinus-Vereinigung ("Oskar Ursinus Association") bears his name.
