= AEG G.I =

Biplane bomber aircraft model

AEG K.I and G.I
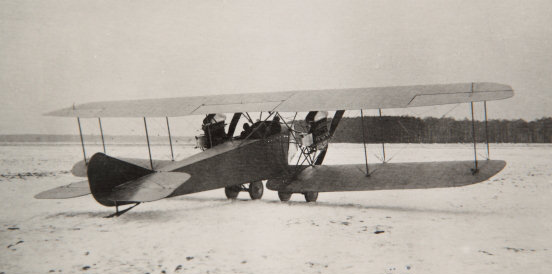

General information
- Type: Bomber
- National origin: Germany
- Manufacturer: AEG
- Primary user: Luftstreitkräfte
- Number built: 2

History
- First flight: January 1915
- Developed into: AEG G.II

The AEG G.I (factory designation GZ1) was a prototype twin-engined German biplane built by the Allgemeine Elektricitäts-Gesellschaft (AEG) during the First World War for the Imperial German Army's (Deutsches Heer) Imperial German Air Service (Luftstreitkräfte). The first prototype was designated as the K.I. Flight testing showed that it performed well enough to justify a second, more heavily armed, prototype designated as the G.I for testing under combat conditions.

== Development ==
The G.I was conceived as a battleplane (Kampfflugzeug) or aerial cruiser that was to be capable of engaging enemy aircraft with its flexible machine guns as well as attacking ground targets. The Imperial German Air Service's Inspectorate of Flying Troops (Inspektion der Fliegertruppen, or Idflieg) issued a requirement in July 1914 for a three-man battleplane with enough fuel to fly for six hours, a flexible gun for the aerial observer in the nose, the ability to lift a useful load of 450 kilograms (990 lb) and an engine with a minimum of 200 horsepower (150 kW).

No engine that powerful was available in Germany, so AEG had to use two water-cooled, 100-horsepower (75 kW) Mercedes D.I straight-six piston engines in a tractor configuration. These were mounted on struts located between the two-bay wings. The K.I's fuselage was built from steel tubing and its nose was protected by thin armor plate to protect the gunner; the rest of the fuselage was covered by doped fabric. The pilot's cockpit was located underneath the upper wing. The aircraft made its first flight in January 1915. Idflieg's designation system had changed from K to G for multi-engined aircraft by the time that the G.I was ordered for combat trials. That aircraft was completed in March and differed from the K.I in that it had two gunners, one in the nose and the other behind the pilot's cockpit. Some parts from the K.I may have been incorporated into the second prototype. The G.I was shipped from the factory to a combat unit on 24 April.

== Specifications (AEG G.I) ==
Data from German Aircraft of the First World War; A.E.G. Aircraft of WWI: A Centennial Perspective on Great War Airplanes

General characteristics

- Crew: 3
- Length: 8.65 m (28 ft 5 in)
- Upper wingspan: 16 m (52 ft 6 in)
- Lower wingspan: 15.2 m (49 ft 10 in)
- Wing area: 61 m^{2} (660 sq ft)
- Empty weight: 1,160 kg (2,557 lb)
- Gross weight: 1,610 kg (3,549 lb)
- Powerplant: 2 × Mercedes D.I water-cooled straight-six piston engines, 75 kW (100 hp) each
- Propellers: 2-bladed

Performance

- Maximum speed: 125 km/h (78 mph, 67 kn)
- Time to altitude: 10–12 minutes to 1,000 m (3,300 ft)

Armament

- Guns: 2 × 7.92 mm (.312 in) machine gun in flexible mounts
- Bombs: small bombs

== See also ==
Related development

- AEG G.II
- AEG G.III
- AEG G.IV
- AEG G.V

Aircraft of comparable role, configuration, and era

- Caproni Ca.1 (1914)
- Friedrichshafen G.I
- Gotha G.I

== Bibliography ==
- Gray, Peter & Thetford, Owen (1987) [1970]. German Aircraft of the First World War (2nd ed.). London: Putnam. ISBN 0-85177-809-7.
- Grosz, Peter M. (2000). Gotha G.I. Windsock Datafile. Vol. 83. Berkhamsted, UK: Albatros Productions. ISBN 1-902207-25-4.
- Herris, Jack (2014). Rumpler Aircraft of WWI: A Centennial Perspective on Great War Airplanes. Great War Aviation Centennial Series. Vol. 11. n.p.: Aeronaut Books. ISBN 978-1-935881-21-6.
- Herris, Jack (2015). A.E.G. Aircraft of WWI: A Centennial Perspective on Great War Airplanes. Great War Aviation Centennial Series. Vol. 16. n. p.: Aeronaut Books. ISBN 978-1-935881-28-5.
- Kroschel, Günter & Stützer, Helmut (1977). Die deutschen Militärflugzeuge 1910–1918: in 127 Vierseitenrissen im Massstab 1:144 [German Military Aircraft 1910-1918: In 127 Four-page Drawings to 1:144 Scale] (in German). Wilhelmshaven, West Germany: Lohse-Eissing. ISBN 3-920602-18-8.
