= Gotha G.I =

Heavy bomber biplane model

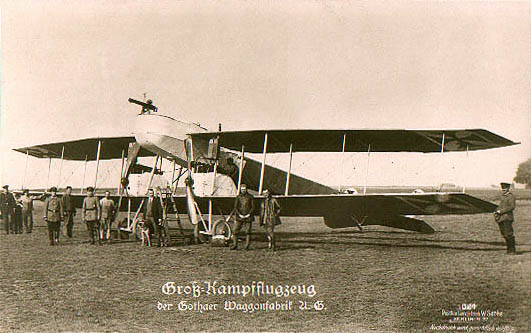
- Gotha-Ursinus GUH G.I - Groß - Kampfflugzeug der Gothaer Waggonfabrik A. G., Sanke Postkarte Nr. 1021 (Gotha-Ursinus GUH GI - Large - Fighting aircraft from Gothaer Waggonfabrik AG, Sanke postcard no. 1021)

General information
- Type: Bomber
- Manufacturer: Gothaer Waggonfabrik AG
- Designer: Oskar Ursinus and Helmut Friedel
- Primary user: Luftstreitkräfte
- Number built: 20

History
- First flight: 30 January 1915

The Gotha G.I was a bomber aircraft used by the Luftstreitkräfte (Imperial German Air Service) during the First World War.

== Design and development ==
In mid-1914, Oskar Ursinus, the founder and editor of the German flying magazine Flugsport, began designing a large twin-engine seaplane of unconventional configuration. While most biplane designs have the fuselage attached to the lower wing, Ursinus had a snub-nosed fuselage attached to the upper wing, and twin engine nacelles mounted on the lower one. The purpose of this arrangement was to allow the engines to be kept close together thereby minimizing asymmetrical thrust in the event of an engine failure, although Ursinus later also claimed that this design balanced out the lowering of the centre of pressure as speed increased and minimised the drag on the upper wing caused by turbulence from the fuselage.

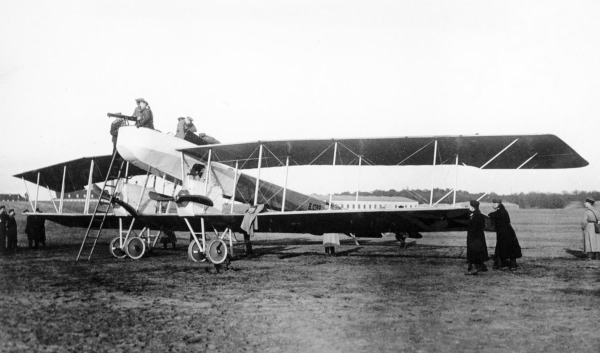
Gotha-Ursinus GUH G.I Kampfflugzeug adaptation of the original seaplane concept (Nowarra photo)

Ursinus was conscripted into the army on 1 August 1914 and little over a week later, presented his commanding officer, Major Helmut Friedel, with the seaplane design adapted into a Kampfflugzeug (battle aircraft) intended for ground attack duties. Apart from the aerodynamic benefits claimed by Ursinus, the aircraft's unorthodox layout provided excellent views for the three crewmen and broad fields of fire for the gunner. The design also matched the specifications that Inspektion der Fliegertruppen (Idflieg, Inspectorate of Flying Troops) had issued in March that year for a "Type III" large military aircraft, and Friedel ordered the construction of a prototype.

This aircraft was built by the men in his unit, Fliegerersatz Abteilung 3 (Aviator Replacement Unit 3) and received the Idfleig serial number B.1092/14 (B: a two-seat unarmed biplane in the IdFlieg type system), although it was generally known as the FU for "Friedel-Ursinus". It was powered by two 75 kW (101 hp) Mercedes D.I engines, and in keeping with the "Type III" requirement, was armed with a 7.92 mm (0.312 in) machine gun in the nose. The engines and crew were protected by 200 kg (440 lb) of chrome-nickel armor.

=== Prototype ===
The prototype first flew on 30 January 1915 and was inspected by Dr Heller, an Idflieg engineer, on 20 February. His report confirmed that the aircraft conformed to the specification and Ursinus' claims about the excellent field of fire and advantages of the design in single-engine operation. He also noted that the aircraft was difficult to fly, lacking in structural integrity, dangerous to the crew in the event of a crash landing and underpowered. Despite its shortcomings, the FU was sent to the front, assigned to Feld Flieger Abteilung 28 (FFA 28) reconnaissance unit at Ujatz on the Russian Front in early 1915.

=== Idflieg contract ===
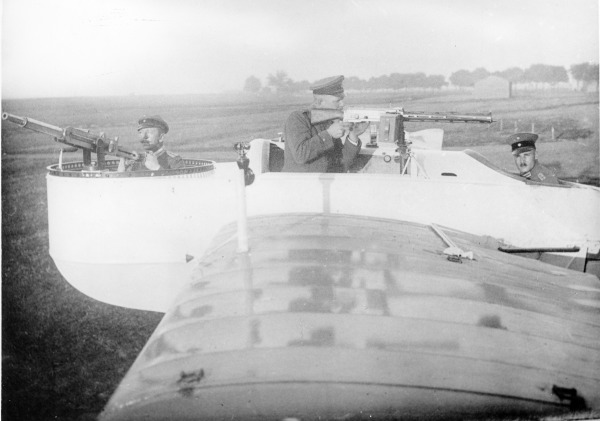
A Gotha-Ursinus GUH G.I cockpit section with Oskar Ursinus in the front gunner's position aiming an early 20 mm aircraft autocannon

With the design proved under service conditions, Idflieg issued a contract on 1 April for series production to Gothaer Waggonfabrik AG, which acquired a license from Ursinus, who held the patent to the design. The price per aircraft was M 32,000 without engines. Gothaer chief engineer Hans Burkhard simplified and refined the design, which was originally known as the Gotha-Ursinus-Heeresflugzeug (GUH, Gotha-Ursinus Army Aircraft) later known as the Gotha G.I or Gotha-Ursinus G.I. The first production aircraft was completed on 27 July 1915. These aircraft were powered by two 110 kW (150 hp) Benz Bz.III engines. Gothaer Waggonfabrik built eighteen G.I aircraft in three batches of six before production ceased at the end of the year. The final batch was powered by 120 kW (160 hp) Mercedes D.III engines and featured an extra defensive machine gun and nearly double the armor of previous examples.

=== Floatplane ===
One Navy Number 120 Ursinus-Wasser-Doppeldecker (UWD, Ursinus Water Biplane) floatplane version of the G.I was also built, ordered by the Navy in April 1915 and delivered in February 1916; as per Ursinus' original intentions from two years earlier. During a test flight, six men climbed aboard to take the place of ballast. When they emerged after landing, a nearby naval officer likened the aircraft to the Trojan Horse (Trojanisches Pferd) and this nickname stuck. It was used operationally until 2 October when it was written off after a hard landing at Zeebrugge.

== Operational history ==
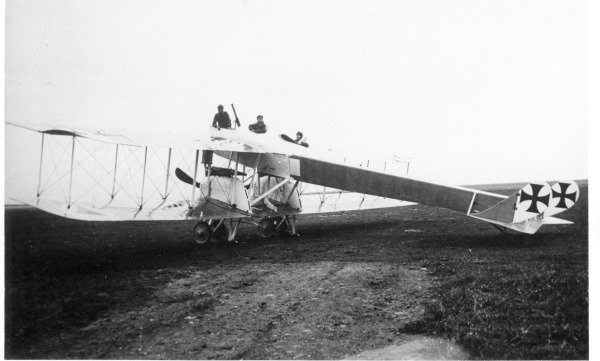
Gotha-Ursinus GUH G.I

Today, little is known about the G.I's service history. Idflieg records show only small numbers ever in service, the most being five in October and six in December 1915. At this stage of the war, Type G aircraft were being used for defensive patrols, reconnaissance and only rarely for bombing. By the time it reached the front, the Gotha G.I was already an easy target for faster and more maneuverable fighters and the few pilot recollections that have survived are largely unfavourable to the type. Manfred von Richthofen served as a machine gunner in a Gotha G.I at Ostend and in Champagne-Ardenne during the First Battle of Champagne with Georg Zeumer as his pilot. The UWD seaplane is known to have participated in an air-raid on Dover on 19 March 1916, bombing Langton Fort and the Shoulder of Mutton battery.

== Variants ==
- FU - (Friedel-Ursinus) - single prototype (B.1092/14)
- G.I - standard production version
- UWD - (Ursinus Wasser Doppeldecker - Ursinus Water Biplane) - seaplane variant with twin floats (1 only built), also known as the WD.4.

== Operators ==
Data from Grosz, The Gotha GI–GIV (1966) and Gotha G.I (2000)

- German Empire
  - Armee-Abteilung Falkenhausen
  - Fliegerersatz Abteilung 1
  - Fliegerersatz Abteilung 3
  - Fliegerersatz Abteilung 5
  - Fliegerersatz Abteilung 7
  - Fliegerersatz Abteilung 37
  - Fliegerersatz Abteilung 46
  - Kampfgeschwader der Kagohl 1 (Note: Kampfgeschwader der Oberste Heeresleitung were tactical bomber wings commanded by OHL the high command of the German Army.)
  - Kagohl 2, Staffel 8
  - Prüfanstalt und Werft
  - Sonderstaffel S

== Specifications (G.U.H. G.I) ==
Data from German Aircraft of the First World War and Gotha G.I.

General characteristics

- Crew: 3
- Length: 12.1 m (39 ft 8 in)
- Wingspan: 20.3 m (66 ft 7 in)
- Height: 3.9 m (12 ft 10 in)
- Wing area: 82 m^{2} (880 sq ft)
- Empty weight: 1,800 kg (3,968 lb)
- Gross weight: 2,966 kg (6,539 lb)
- Powerplant: 2 × Benz Bz.III 6-cylinder water-cooled in-line piston engines, 110 kW (150 hp) each

Performance

- Maximum speed: 130 km/h (81 mph, 70 kn)
- Endurance: 4 hours
- Service ceiling: 2,750 m (9,020 ft)
- Rate of climb: 0.7 m/s (140 ft/min)
- Time to altitude: 2,750 m (9,022 ft) in 34 minutes

Armament

- Guns: 1–2 × 7.92 mm (0.312 in) Parabellum MG14 machine guns

== See also ==
Related development

- Gotha G.II

Aircraft of comparable role, configuration, and era

- AEG G.II
- Caproni Ca.1 (1914)
- Friedrichshafen G.I

Related lists

- List of military aircraft of Germany
- List of bomber aircraft
