= Idflieg aircraft designation system =

Early German military aircraft classification

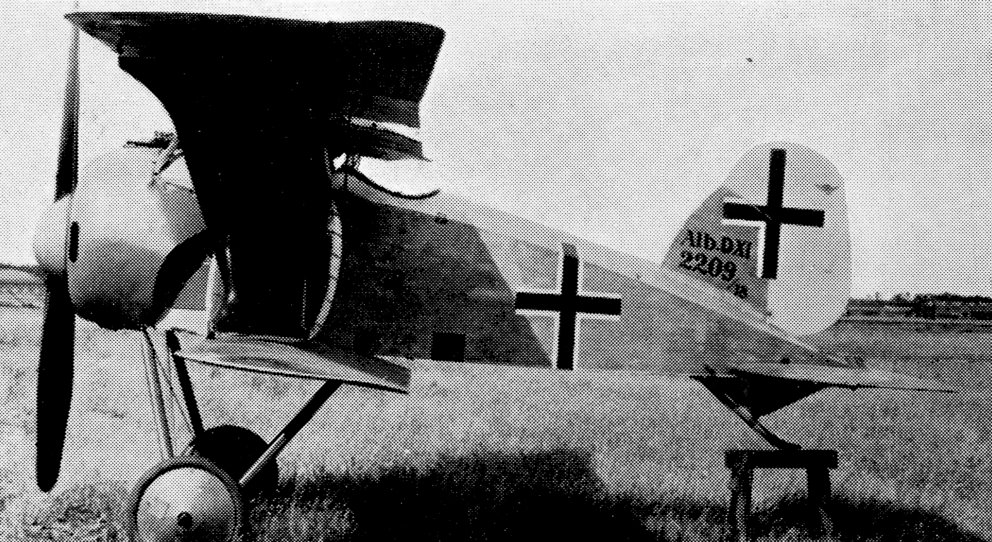
Albatros D.XI prototype showing type designation displayed as part of serial number marking

The Idflieg (Inspektion der Fliegertruppen/Inspectorate of Flying Troops) designation system was used to classify German heavier-than-air military (as opposed to naval) aircraft from the early days of the Fliegertruppe/Luftstreitkräfte to the end of World War I. The system evolved during this period as new classes of aircraft came into use.

The specific, official "name" of a Luftstreitkräfte aircraft type consisted of the name of the manufacturer, the designation allocated to its class or category, and finally a Roman numeral. Thus the first "D"-class aircraft built by Albatros was named the Albatros D.I, the second was the Albatros D.II and so on.

== Application ==
A complication in identifying wartime German aircraft is that German manufacturers typically used their own designations; and sometimes gave experimental productions unofficial "Idflieg-style" class numbers, perhaps in the hope of production orders. The "Rs" (giant seaplane), and "CLs" (two-seater seaplane) designations of the Zeppelin-Lindau company are examples, as are the unofficial "Dr" designations of the experimental Euler triplanes, which remained prototypes and were never officially named.

The German Navy had a system for classification of aircraft types but did not use this, nor the Luftstreitkräfte system, to specify particular aircraft types, preferring to use manufacturers' designations. Airships were outside either system, being individually numbered in the same way as German destroyers and submarines, mostly in the "L" series. As well as serving to identify types, Idflieg class letters were normally included as part of German aircraft serial number markings.

== List of Idflieg class letter prefixes ==
A
Originally applied to all monoplane aircraft. "A" type aircraft (for example the Rumpler Taube and Fokker M.5) were at no stage limited by any official specification apart from their wing layout; in practice most "A" class aircraft were unarmed two seat reconnaissance or training aircraft. Exceptions were the single-seat Fokker "A" types that became the "E" class fighters when they were armed with synchronised machine guns. After 1915, the "A" class gradually became extinct, as examples reached obsolescence and were discarded. Later monoplanes were included in the "D", "C" or "CL" classes, with equivalent biplanes.
B
Originally all biplanes. Not connected to any official specification, apart from the wing layout. In practice, later types in the "B" class were all low powered unarmed two-seaters, mostly used for training and other second line duties.
C
Two-seat armed biplanes (designation introduced by April 1915). This was the first new designation to be introduced after the outbreak of war and the first to have a defining specification. To reduce the vulnerability of early German military aircraft to Allied types equipped with machine guns, "C" types were armed with a rearward firing machine gun operated by the observer and (later) a forward firing synchronised machine gun for the pilot. An engine of more than 150 hp was also specified (later "C" types typically had over 200 hp). A number of future German fighter aces obtained their first victories in a "C" type aircraft
CL
Lightweight "C" class aircraft (designation introduced early 1917). Later "C" types became progressively larger – the "CL" specification was intended to provide smaller aircraft, nimble enough to be used as escorts for the heavier "Cs": effectively two-seat fighters. In practice, the "CL" types were mainly used for close support. Engine power of a "CL" was limited to less than 200 hp (150 kW) – and total loaded weight to under 360 kg (790 lb). In other respects "CL" types were similar to "C"s – in fact serial and type numbers generally fell in the same sequence.
CN
"C" class aircraft modified to carry a heavier bomb load for use at night. Designation replaced by "N".
D
Single-seat armed aircraft, specifically intended for use by the new jagdstaffeln (fighter) squadrons (designation introduced in 1916). Until late in 1918, when the system was rationalised, "D" implied an armed doppeldecker (biplane). By the end of the war all single-seat fighters were designated as "D" types, as distinctions based on wing layout were abandoned.
DJ
Armoured "D" class aircraft. The only type in this class was the prototype AEG DJ.I and the designation may not have been official.
Dr
Single-seat armed triplane, (Dreidecker ). Designation introduced in late 1917 and abandoned in late 1918. The first two Fokker Dr.I service test aircraft were in fact called "F.I". By the end of the war all new single-seat fighters became "D" types, regardless of wing layout.
E
Armed monoplane (designation introduced in 1915 – abandoned in late 1918), from Eindecker. This was initially simply the monoplane version of the "C" class armed biplane, having the same relationship to the "C" class as the "A" had to the "B", and several early "E" types were two-seaters. In practice, due largely to the success of the single seat Fokker "E" types, which were single-seat fighters, the "E" class came to mean a single-seat fighter monoplane (i.e. the monoplane equivalent of the "D" class). In late 1918 the last "E" type, the Fokker E.V was redesignated the "D.VIII", and other late war monoplane types (such as the Junkers CL.I) were also designated in their "functional" class, in line with the abandonment of designations based on wing layout.
F
Single-seat armed triplane (designation used briefly in 1917). Applied only to the Fokker F.I, which was redesignated the "Dr.I" by the time it went into production.
G
Armed twin-engined biplane bomber aircraft, originally bore the "K" (Kampfflugzeug - "battle aircraft", see below) designation at the war's start, became "G" (Großflugzeug - "large aircraft") in 1915.
GL
Faster twin-engined aircraft suitable for use as day-bombers or for long range reconnaissance (designation introduced in 1918). Bore a similar relationship to the "G" as the "CL" bore to the "C". Weight and wing span were reduced, and crew was limited to two – the forward gunner’s cockpit being eliminated.
J
Armoured dual-role liaison aircraft and ground attack aircraft (designation introduced in 1917). Most examples resembled "C" types in general layout – differing only in being fitted with armour to reduce vulnerability to ground fire. The exception to this was the Junkers J.I, designed specifically as an armoured aircraft.
K
Armed biplane bomber aircraft with two or three engines (Kampfflugzeug–"battle aircraft"). Designation introduced early in 1915, and replaced by "G" later that year. (see "G" types above)
L
Heavy bomber mid way between G and R classes. Applied only to the Siemens-Schuckert L.I, which never saw operational service.
N
Two-seat single engined night (Nacht) bomber. Basically a "C" type aircraft with longer wing span to enable a heavier war-load. Designation introduced in 1918, superseding "CN" specification.
R
Large bomber aircraft with at least three, in some cases up to six engines (Riesenflugzeug–"giant aircraft"). An important distinguishing feature from the "G" class (apart from size) was that all engines should be accessible in flight to permit running repairs.

== Post war ==
The system ceased to apply with the end of German military aviation following the Armistice; in the nineteen twenties and thirties, although the Fokker company gave its new military types "Idflieg" style numbers, to continue war-time sequences. Fokker two seat military reconnaissance aircraft continued the wartime "C" series and Fokker single-seater fighters were given numbers in the "D" series to exploit the reputation of the wartime D.VII. Aircraft of the Luftwaffe were named according to the RLM aircraft designation system.

== Bibliography ==
- Cheesman, E. F. (1960). Fighter Aircraft of the 1914–1918 War. Harleyford.
- Cooling, Benjamin Franklin (1990). Case Studies in the Development of Close Air Support. Washington, DC: Office of Air Force History, U.S. Air Force. pp. 24–25. ISBN 978-0-912799-64-3.
- Gray, Peter; Thetford, Owen (1962). German Aircraft of the First World War. Putnam.
- Haddow, G. W.; Grosz, Peter M. (1962). The German Giants: The Story of the R-Planes 1914–1919. london: Putnam.
- Heneger, Hery (1961). Fokker: The Man and the Aircraft. Harleyford.
- Nowarra, Heinz (1966). Marine Aircraft of the 1914–1918 War. Harleyford.
- Parsch, Andreas; Martynov, Aleksey V. (2004). "German and Austro-Hungarian Military Aircraft Designations (1914–1918)". www.designation-systems.net.
- VanWyngarden, Greg (2006). Early German Aces of World War 1. Aircraft of the Aces 73. Osprey. ISBN 9781841769974.
