= Halberstadt (disambiguation) =

Halberstadt is a town in the German state of Saxony-Anhalt and the capital of the district of Harz.

It can also refer to:

== Places ==
Several territories centered on the town have used its name:

- Bishopric of Halberstadt, a Roman Catholic diocese and state of the Holy Roman Empire until the Peace of Westphalia
- Principality of Halberstadt, the secularized successor to the Bishopric of Halberstadt after the Peace of Westphalia
- Halberstadt (district), a former district (Kreis) in the middle of Saxony-Anhalt, Germany, merged with other districts in 2007 to form the district of Harz.

== People ==
- Alex Halberstadt (born 1970), American writer
- Amy Halberstadt (born 1954), American psychologist
- Hans Halberstadt (1885–1966), German-born American Olympic fencer
- Haymo of Halberstadt (died 853), German Benedictine monk and author who served as bishop of Halberstadt
- Joseph Allen Halberstadt (born 1988), American drummer
- Milton Halberstadt (1919–2000), American photographer
- Naphtali Herz Halberstadt (fl. 18th century), Volhynian rabbi
- Randy Halberstadt (born 1953), American jazz musician
- Scott Halberstadt (born 1976), American film and television actor
- Vitaly Halberstadt (1903-1967), French chess master
- Victor Halberstadt (born 1939), Professor of Public Sector Finance

== Aircraft ==
Halberstädter Flugzeugwerke was a German aircraft manufacturer established in 1912, and dissolved after the end of World War I. Aircraft made by the company included:

- Halberstadt C.V
- Halberstadt CL.II
- Halberstadt CL.IV
- Halberstadt D.I
- Halberstadt D.II

== Sport ==
- VfB Germania Halberstadt, a German football club located in Halberstadt, which as of the 2011–12 season was playing in Regionalliga Nord
