= Halberstadt C.VII =

WWI German reconnaissance biplane

C.VII

General information
- Type: Reconnaissance
- Manufacturer: Halberstädter Flugzeugwerke

History
- First flight: 1918
- Developed from: Halberstadt C.V
- Variant: Halberstadt C.IX

The Halberstadt C.VII was a German single-engined reconnaissance biplane of World War I, built by Halberstädter Flugzeugwerke. It was derived from the Halberstadt C.V, with a more powerful supercharged 183 kW (245 hp) Maybach Mb.IV engine.

== Specifications ==
Data from

General characteristics

- Crew: 2
- Length: 6.92 m (22 ft 8 in)
- Wingspan: 13.62 m (44 ft 8 in)
- Height: 3.36 m (11 ft 0 in)
- Wing area: 43 m^{2} (460 sq ft)
- Empty weight: 930 kg (2,050 lb)
- Gross weight: 1,635 kg (3,605 lb)
- Powerplant: 1 × Maybach Mb.IV 6-cyl. water-cooled in-line piston engine, 183 kW (245 hp)

Performance

- Maximum speed: 170 km/h (110 mph, 92 kn)
- Endurance: 3½ hours
- Service ceiling: 5,000 m (16,000 ft)
- Rate of climb: 10.42 m/s (2,051 ft/min)
- Time to altitude:
  - 2,000 m (6,562 ft) in 3 minutes 12 seconds
  - 5,000 m (16,404 ft) in 23 minutes

Armament

- Guns:
- 1x 7.92 mm (0.312 in) LMG 08/15 Spandau machine gun mounted in the forward fuselage port side
- 1x 7.92 mm (0.312 in) Parabellum machine gun on a flexible mounting in the rear cockpit
- up to 50 kg of bombs

== See also ==
Related lists

- List of military aircraft of Germany
