= Halberstadt C.III =

German single engine biplane (WW2)

C.III
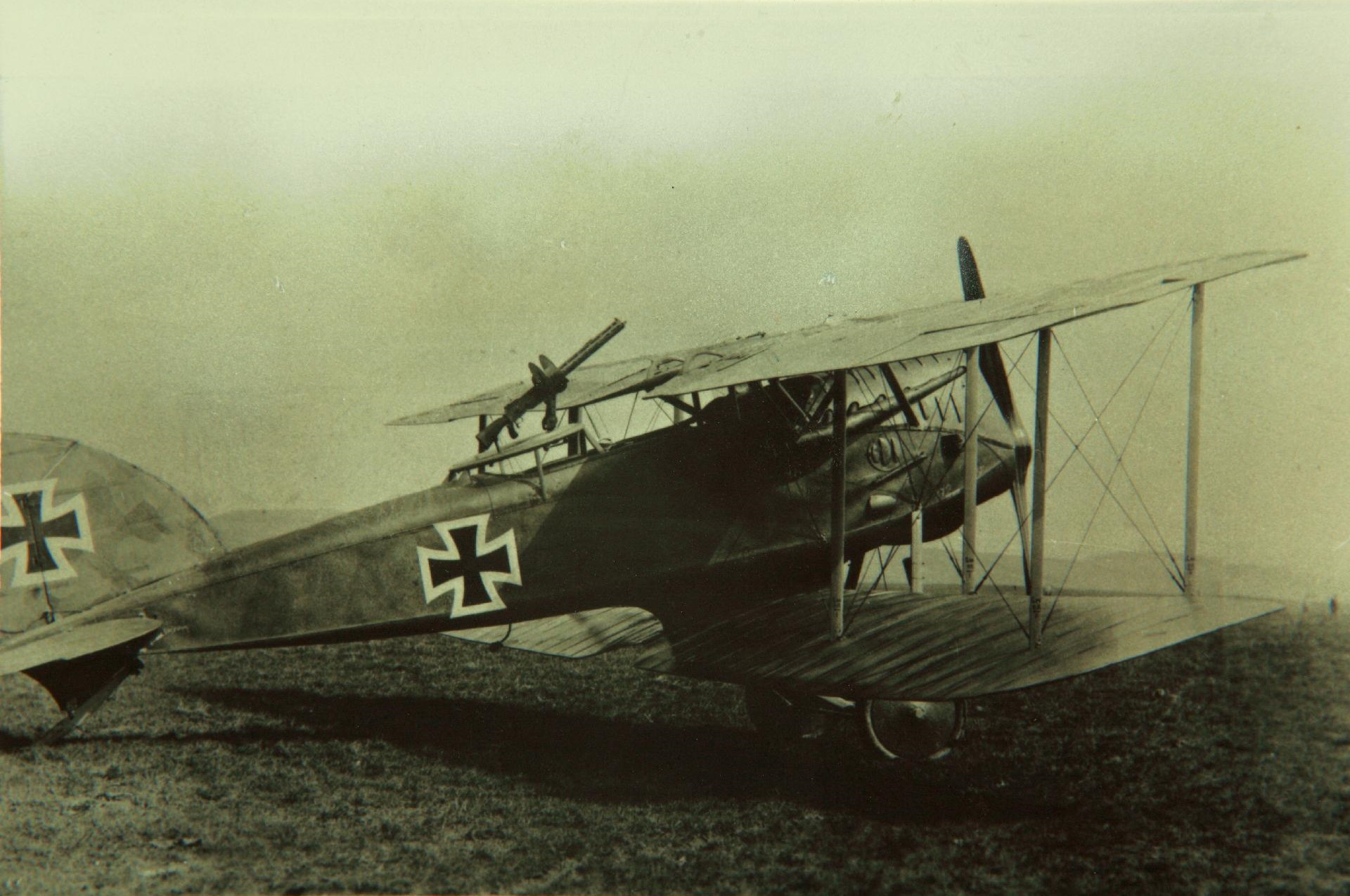

General information
- Type: Reconnaissance
- Manufacturer: Halberstädter Flugzeugwerke
- Primary user: Luftstreitkräfte
- Number built: 6

History
- First flight: Late 1917
- Developed from: Halberstadt C.I
- Developed into: Halberstadt C.V

The Halberstadt C.III was a German single-engined reconnaissance biplane of World War I, built by Halberstädter Flugzeugwerke.

== Design ==
The Halberstadt C.III was a structurally similar C.I equipped with a Benz Bz.IV engine with a power of 200 hp. The aircraft's armament consisted of one front 7.92-mm machine gun LMG 08/15 Spandau and one turret 7.92-mm machine gun Parabellum mounted in the rear cockpit on a mobile turret. It was developed into the Halberstadt C.V in late 1918.

== Operators ==
German Empire

- Luftstreitkrafte

== Specifications ==
Data from German and Austro-Hungarian Aircraft Manufacturers 1908-1918

General characteristics

- Crew: 2
- Length: 7.70 m (25 ft 3 in)
- Wingspan: 12.20 m (40 ft 0 in)
- Height: 2.95 m (9 ft 8 in)
- Empty weight: 850 kg (1,874 lb)
- Gross weight: 1,310 kg (2,888 lb)
- Powerplant: 1 × Benz Bz.IV 6-cyl. water-cooled in-line piston engine, 150 kW (200 hp)

Performance

- Maximum speed: 165 km/h (103 mph, 89 kn)
- Endurance: 3 hours
- Service ceiling: 5,100 m (16,700 ft)
- Rate of climb: 10.4 m/s (2,050 ft/min)
- Time to altitude:
  - 2,000 m (6,600 ft) in 3 minutes 12 seconds
  - 5,000 m (16,000 ft) in 23 minutes

Armament

- Guns:
- 1x 7.92 mm (0.312 in) LMG 08/15 Spandau machine gun mounted in the forward fuselage port side
- 1x 7.92 mm (0.312 in) on a flexible mounting in the rear cockpit
- four 22 lb bombs

== See also ==
Related lists

- List of military aircraft of Germany
