= Halberstadt CLS.I =

WWI German reconnaissance biplane

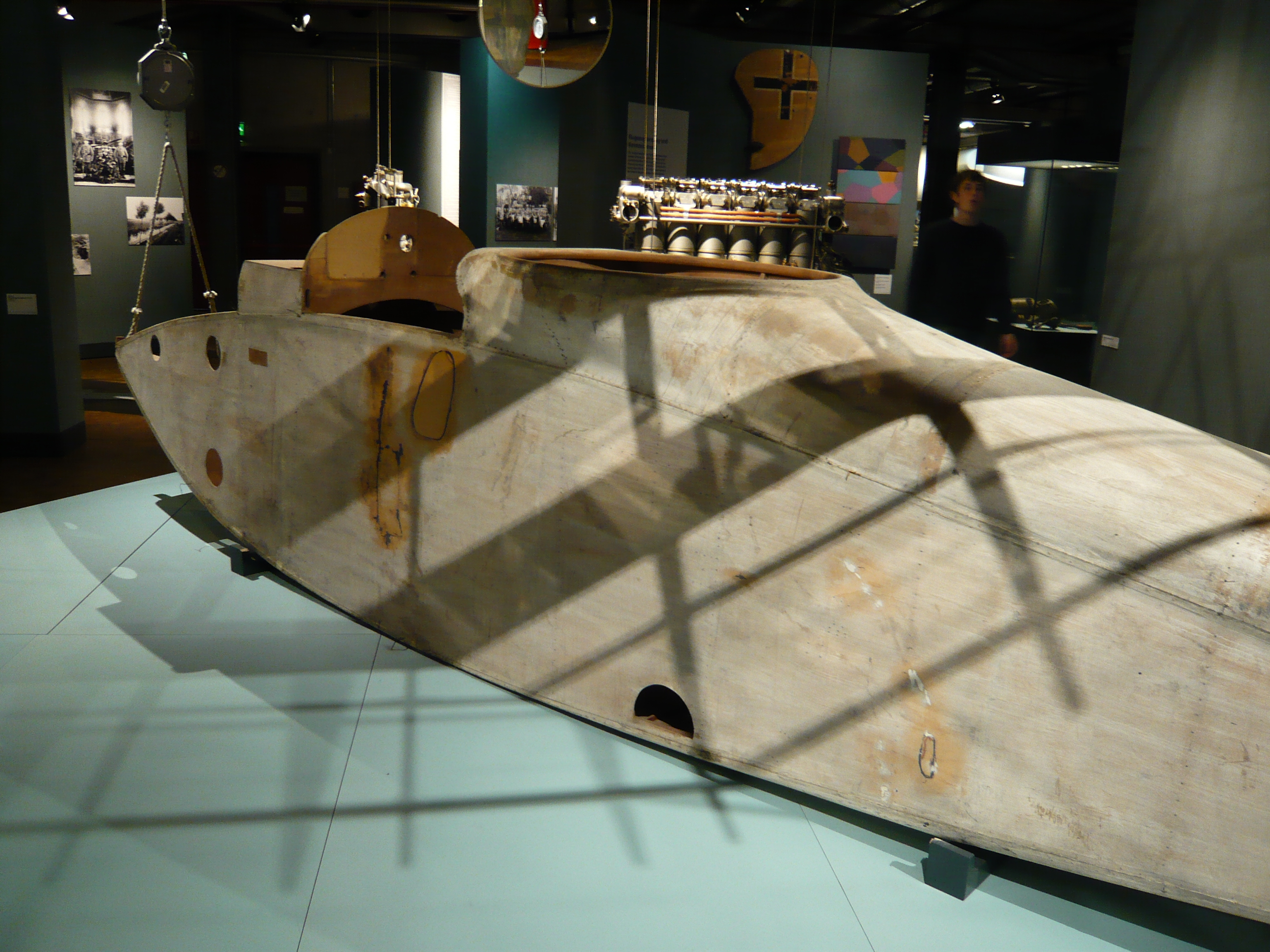
- CLS.I fuselage on display at the German Museum of Technology, Berlin

General information
- Type: Reconnaissance aircraft
- Manufacturer: Halberstadt
- Status: prototype only
- Primary user: Luftstreitkräfte
- Number built: 1

History
- First flight: October 1918
- Developed from: Halberstadt CL.IV

The Germania C.I was a prototype two-seat general-purpose biplane built by Halberstadt during World War I.

== Design and development ==
Halberstadt based the CLS.I on the earlier CL.IV design, with modifications including a modified wing profile of a lower curvature and a more streamlined rear fuselage. All these improvements were introduced to obtain a higher flight speed, (hence "S" in CLS standing for schnell, meaning "fast" in German). The prototype flew on 2 October 1918, but the aircraft did not enter production due to the Armistice.

Halberstadt had plans for derivatives of the CLS.I armed with 3.5 cm (1.378 in) revolver cannon, the CLS II and CLS X, but these designs never left the drawing board by the end of World War I.

== Specifications (CLS I) ==
Data from

General characteristics

- Crew: 2
- Length: 6.95 m (22 ft 10 in)
- Wingspan: 9.7 m (31 ft 10 in)
- Height: 3.05 m (10 ft 0 in)
- Wing area: 26.4 m^{2} (284 sq ft)
- Empty weight: 682 kg (1,504 lb)
- Gross weight: 1,102 kg (2,429 lb)
- Powerplant: 1 × Mercedes D.III 6-cylinder water-cooled in-line piston engine, 120 kW (160 hp)
- Propellers: 2-bladed wooden fixed-pitch propeller

Performance

- Maximum speed: 185 km/h (115 mph, 100 kn)
- Time to altitude: 4,500 m (14,800 ft) in 36 minutes

Armament

- Guns: 1x fixed forward firing synchronised 7.92 mm (0.312 in) LMG 08/15 Spandau machine gun and 1x flexibly mounted Parabellum MG14 in the rear cockpit
- Bombs: 4x 10 kg (22 lb) bombs

== See also ==
Related development

- Albatros B.II
- Albatros C.III

Aircraft of comparable role, configuration, and era

- LVG C.II
- Royal Aircraft Factory B.E.2
- Rumpler C.I

Related lists

- List of military aircraft of Germany
