= Halberstadt C.I =

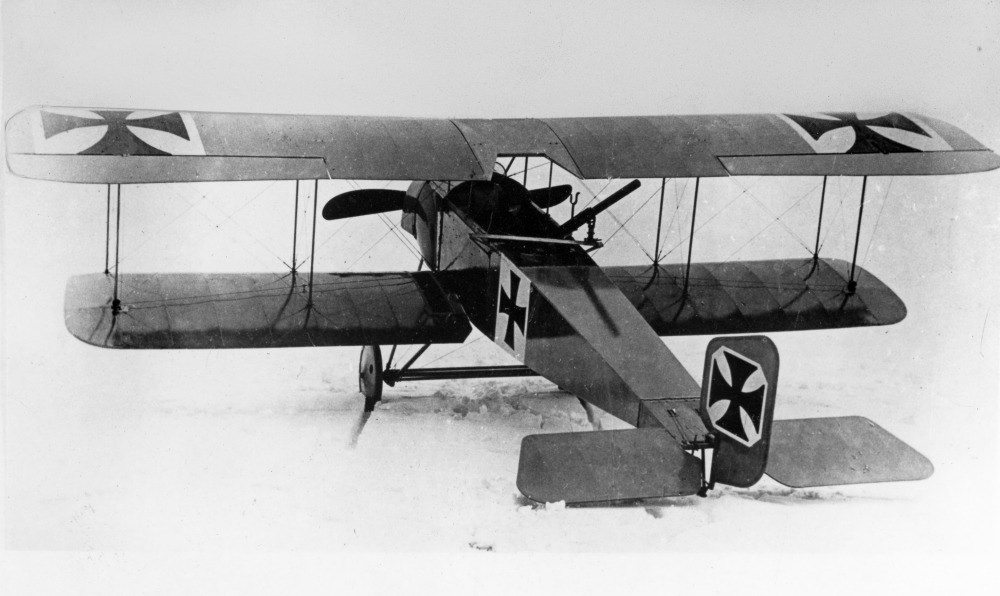
- Halberstadt C.I on a snow covered runway during WWI

General information
- Type: Reconnaissance
- Manufacturer: Halberstädter Flugzeugwerke
- Primary user: Luftstreitkräfte

History
- First flight: Late 1917
- Developed from: Halberstadt B.II

The Halberstadt C.I was a German single-engined reconnaissance biplane of World War I, built by Halberstädter Flugzeugwerke.

== Design ==
The Halberstadt C.I was designed in late 1916 as a reconnaissance derivative of the company's B.II equipped with an Oberusel U.1 rotary engine. The aircraft's armament consisted of two front 7.92-mm machine gun LMG 08/15 Spandau and one turret 7.92-mm machine gun Parabellum mounted in the rear cockpit on a mobile turret.

== Operators ==
German Empire

- Luftstreitkrafte

== Specifications ==
Data from

General characteristics

- Crew: 2
- Length: 7.1 m (23 ft 4 in)
- Wingspan: 9.6 m (31 ft 6 in)
- Height: 2.7 m (8 ft 10 in)
- Powerplant: 1 × Oberursel U.I rotary piston engine, 82 kW (110 hp)

Performance

- Maximum speed: 165 km/h (103 mph, 89 kn)
- Endurance: 600 Km

Armament

- Guns:
- 2x 7.92 mm (0.312 in) LMG 08/15 Spandau machine gun mounted in the forward fuselage port side
- 1x 7.92 mm (0.312 in) Parabellum machine gun on a flexible mounting in the rear cockpit

== See also ==
Related lists

- List of military aircraft of Germany
