= Halberstadt G.I =

WWI German medium bomber

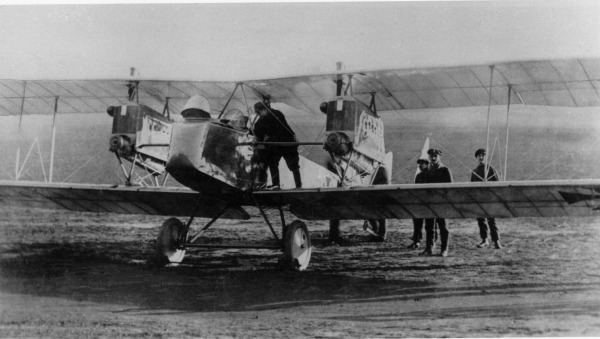

General information
- Type: Heavy Bomber
- Manufacturer: Halberstädter Flugzeugwerke (Halberstadt)
- Primary user: Luftstreitkräfte

History
- First flight: spring 1916

The Halberstadt G.I was a German prototype heavy bomber built by Halberstädter Flugzeugwerke during World War I.

== Design ==
It was a two-seat biplane equipped with two 160 hp (120 kW) Mercedes D.III engines. The aircraft's armament consisted of one or two Parabellum MG14 7.92 mm (0.312 in) machine guns mounted in the rear cockpit on a flexible mount. Maximum bomb load was 440 lb (200 kg).

== Development ==
The Halberstadt G.I first flew in spring 1916, but test results showed no real improvement over existed G-series aircraft, and the Luftstreitkrafte rejected the design for consideration into production.

== Specifications (G.I) ==
Data from German Aircraft of the First World War

General characteristics

- Crew: 2
- Length: 9 m (29 ft 6 in)
- Wingspan: 15.5 m (50 ft 10 in)
- Height: 3.2 m (10 ft 6 in)
- Empty weight: 1,220 kg (2,690 lb)
- Gross weight: 1,895 kg (4,178 lb)
- Powerplant: 2 × Mercedes D.III 6-cylinder water-cooled in-line piston engines, 120 kW (160 hp) each
- Propellers: 2-bladed wooden fixed-pitch propellers

Performance

- Maximum speed: 152 km/h (94 mph, 82 kn)
- Service ceiling: 6,000 m (20,000 ft)

Armament

- Guns: 1 or 2 7.92 mm (0.312 in) Parabellum MG14 machine guns
- Bombs: 440 lb (200 kg) of light bombs

== See also ==
Aircraft of comparable role, configuration, and era

- AEG G.II
- Caproni Ca.1 (1914)
- Friedrichshafen G.I
- Gotha G.I

Related lists

- List of military aircraft of Germany
- List of bomber aircraft
