= Messerschmitt Me 265 =

German heavy fighter project

The Messerschmitt Me 265 was a design project for a Zerstörer (“Destroyer;” heavy fighter), produced by leading German aircraft manufacturer Messerschmitt in World War II.

== Design ==
The Me 265 was designed in 1942, intended to replace the failing Me 210. It was also known as the Lippisch Li P 10.

The Me 265 was an aerodynamically advanced design, using a tailless delta-shaped flying wing and two pusher propellers built into the wing. The two-man crew sat back-to-back in the cockpit. It was powered by two Daimler-Benz DB 603 liquid-cooled, 12-cylinder piston engines, each engine producing 1,750 hp. These engines were mounted in a pusher configuration.

Ultimately, the design of the Me 265/Li P 10 was rejected in favour of the more conventional Me 410, which re-used a greater proportion of Me 210 components and could be brought into production more quickly.

== Specifications ==
Data from

General characteristics

- Crew: 2
- Length: 10 m (32 ft 10 in)
- Wingspan: 17.4 m (57 ft 1 in)
- Wing area: 45 m^{2} (480 sq ft)
- Empty weight: 6,300 kg (13,889 lb)
- Gross weight: 11,000 kg (24,251 lb)
- Powerplant: 2 × Daimler-Benz DB 603 V-12 inverted liquid-cooled piston engines, 1,305 kW (1,750 hp) each

Performance

- Maximum speed: 675 km/h (419 mph, 364 kn) at 5,400 m (17,717 ft)
- Range: 2,000 km (1,200 mi, 1,100 nmi)
- Service ceiling: 9,500 m (31,200 ft)

Armament

- Guns: Most likely 2 × 7.92 mm (.312 in) MG 17 machine guns and 2 × 20 mm MG 151/20 cannons forward-firing; 2 × 13 mm (.51 in) MG 131 machine guns rearward-firing
- Bombs: up to 1,000 kg (2,205 lb)

== See also ==
Related development

- Messerschmitt Me 329

Aircraft of comparable role, configuration, and era

- Messerschmitt Me 210
- Messerschmitt Me 410

Related lists

- List of military aircraft of Germany
