= Messerschmitt Me 329 =

German fighter project

Me 329
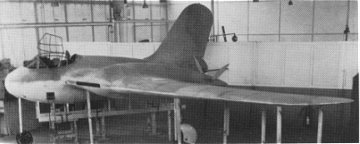

General information
- Type: Zerstorer
- Manufacturer: Messerschmitt
- Designer: Alexander lippisch
- Status: Mock up + motorless glider only [1]
- Primary user: Luftwaffe
- Number built: 1 (motorless prototype glider)

History
- Developed from: Messerschmitt Me 265

The Messerschmitt Me 329 was a design project for a heavy fighter and ground-attack aircraft, developed towards the end of World War II. It was a competitor and possible successor to the Me 410. Like the Me 265, the Me 329 used an advanced tailless design. Other advanced features included the pilot and navigator sitting side by side in a broad bubble canopy, and a remote-controlled rear gun in the tail. In spite of the futuristic design, the improvement in performance over the Me 410 was marginal. Development received a low priority, and while a full-scale glider was tested at Rechlin in the winter of 1944/5, work on the project was cancelled shortly after.

== Specifications (estimated) ==
Data from Luftwaffe secret projects: ground attack & special purpose aircraft

General characteristics

- Crew: 2
- Length: 7.715 m (25 ft 4 in)
- Wingspan: 17.5 m (57 ft 5 in)
- Height: 4.74 m (15 ft 7 in)
- Wing area: 55 m^{2} (590 sq ft)
- Empty weight: 6,950 kg (15,322 lb)
- Gross weight: 12,150 kg (26,786 lb)
- Powerplant: 2 × Daimler-Benz DB 603G V-12 inverted liquid-cooled piston engines 1,745 PS (1,721 hp; 1,283 kW)
- Propellers: 3-bladed constant-speed pusher propellers

Performance

- Maximum speed: 685 km/h (426 mph, 370 kn) at 7,000 m (23,000 ft)
- Range: 2,520 km (1,570 mi, 1,360 nmi)
- Service ceiling: 12,500 m (41,000 ft)

Armament

- Guns:

- 2 × 20 mm MG 151/20 cannons,
- 4 × 30 mm (1.18 in) MK 108 cannons,
- 1 × MK 114 forward firing in fuselage nose
- 1 × 20 mm MG 151/20 rearward-firing

- Bombs:

- internal bomb load of up to 1,000 kg (2,205 lb)

== See also ==
Related development

- Messerschmitt Me 265

Aircraft of comparable role, configuration, and era

- Messerschmitt Me 210
- Messerschmitt Me 410

Related lists

- List of military aircraft of Germany
