= Hütter Hü 136 =

Type of aircraft

Hü 136
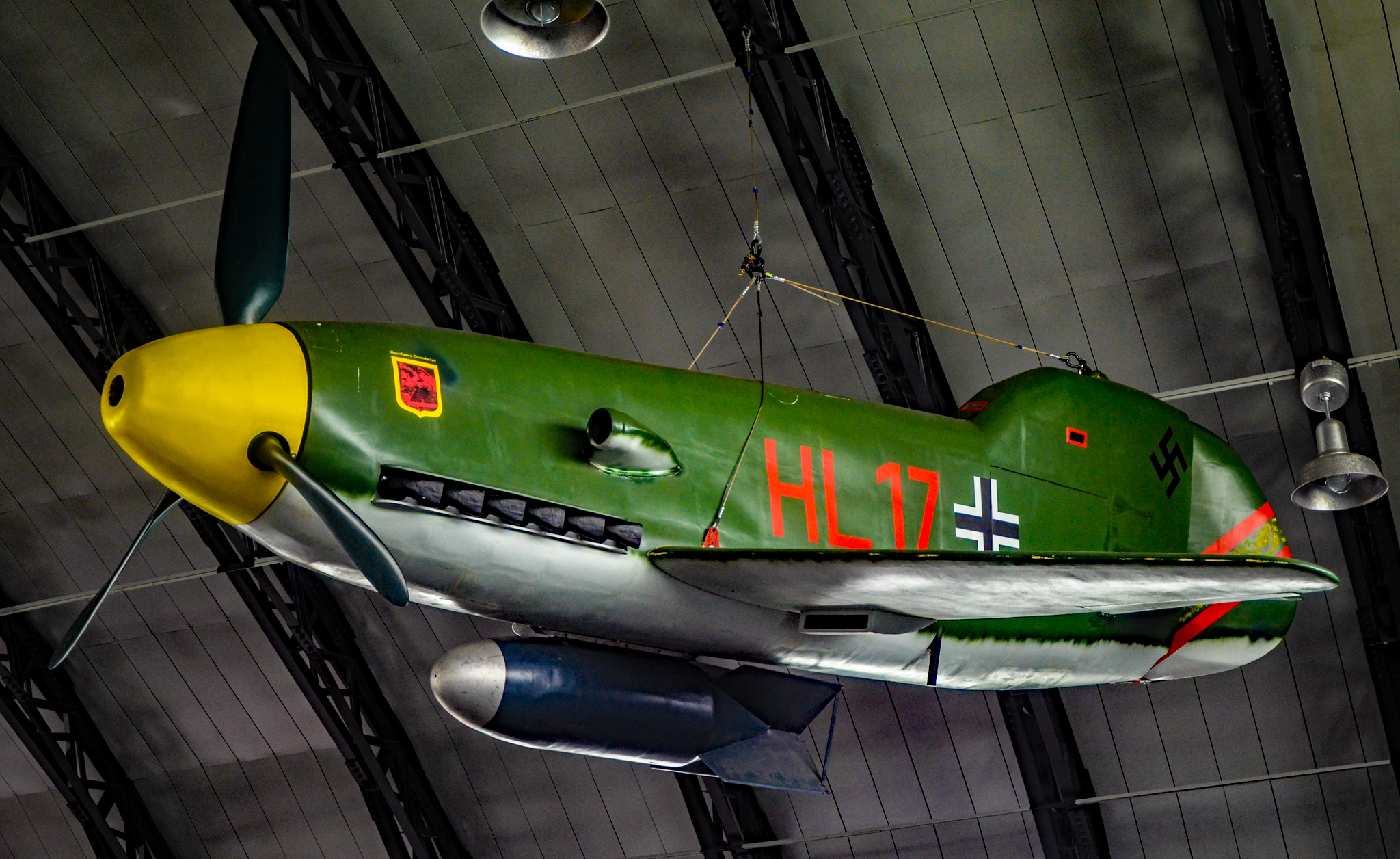
- Hü 136 replica at the Military Aviation Museum in Virginia Beach, Virginia

General information
- Type: Dive bomber
- National origin: Germany
- Manufacturer: Wolfgang and Ulrich Hütter
- Status: Project only

The Hütter Hü 136 was an experimental dive bomber design produced by German engineers Wolfgang and Ulrich Hütter during World War II.

== Design ==
The Hütters, best known as glider designers, responded to Reich Air Ministry calls for high-performance, strongly built dive bombers. The Sturzbomber or Stubo specification came in two parts: Stubo 1, a single-seater with the flight capabilities of a fighter but armoured and with a 500 kg (1,102 lb) bombload; and Stubo 2, a two-seat bomber with similar performance but a 1,000 kg (2,205 lb) bombload.

The Hü 136 design was highly innovative, with the pilot sitting far to the rear of the aircraft, his cockpit forming part of the vertical tail surface. Like the later Me 163 Komet, the design had no undercarriage, with a jettisonable dolly for takeoff and a retractable skid for landing. To overcome the likelihood of contact between the propeller and the ground on landing, the propeller would be blown off before landing and descend separately by parachute.

The German Air Ministry (Reichsluftfahrtministerium) did not pursue the design, preferring to adopt the existing Henschel Hs 129.

== Specifications ==
Data from Luftwaffe secret projects : ground attack & special purpose aircraft

General characteristics

- Length: 7.2 m (23 ft 7 in)
- Wingspan: 6.5 m (21 ft 4 in)
- Gross weight: 3,700 kg (8,157 lb)
- Powerplant: 1 × Daimler-Benz DB 601 V-12 inverted liquid-cooled piston engine, 890 kW (1,200 hp)

Performance

- Range: 2,000 km (1,200 mi, 1,100 nmi)
- Service ceiling: 9,500 m (31,200 ft)

== Replica ==
One replica is on display at the Military Aviation Museum in Virginia Beach, Virginia.

== See also ==
Aircraft of comparable role, configuration, and era

- Henschel Hs 129
- Messerschmitt Me 163

Related lists

- List of military aircraft of Germany
