= Halberstadt B types =

Family of German reconnaissance/training aircraft

The Halberstadt B-types of the Halberstädter Flugzeugwerke were two-seat unarmed reconnaissance/training aircraft of the German Air Force in the First World War.

== Development ==
In 1914, Halberstadt developed a biplane with the Oberursel U.0 rotary engine with 80 hp, which was referred to as Halberstadt B.I and was given the factory name A15. The Halberstadt B.II (B15) was built with a Mercedes D.I inline engine with 105 hp and in 1915 the Halberstadt B.III was produced with the slightly stronger Mercedes D.II (120 hp).

Halberstadt B.II was used as the base for the first armed two-seater, the Halberstadt CL.II.

== Variants ==
A15
Company designation of the aircraft that became the B.I
B15
Company designation of the aircraft that became the B.II
B.I
(Company A15) Reconnaissance aircraft powered by a 60 kW (80 hp) Oberursel U.0 rotary engine.
B.II
(Company B15) Reconnaissance aircraft powered by a 78 kW (105 hp) Mercedes D.I in-line engine.
B.III
(Company B15) Reconnaissance aircraft powered by a 89 kW (120 hp) Mercedes D.II in-line engine.

== Operational history ==
The B.I was used as a trainer aircraft, while the B.II and B.III briefly served as reconnaissance aircraft, but were later also used for pilot training.

== Specifications (B.II) ==
Data from German Aircraft of the First World War, Die deutschen Militärflugzeuge 1910–1918

General characteristics

- Crew: 2
- Wingspan: 12 m (39 ft 4 in)
- Wing area: 32 m^{2} (340 sq ft)
- Empty weight: 641 kg (1,413 lb)
- Gross weight: 1,047 kg (2,308 lb)
- Powerplant: 1 × Mercedes D.I 6-cylinder water-cooled in-line piston engine 105 PS (103.6 hp; 77.2 kW)
- Propellers: 2-bladed fixed-pitch propeller

Performance
