= Naphtali Herz Halberstadt =

Naphtali Herz ben Ẓebi Hirsch Halberstadt (Hebrew: נפתלי הירץ בן צבי הירש אבד״ק האלברשטט; fl. 18th century) was a rabbi at Dubno, Volhynia. Responsa of his regarding the Cleve divorce case are found in Israel Lipschütz's collection Or Israel (1770). In the same collection are some responsa by his brother Solomon Dob Baer, rabbi of Glogau. Another brother, Simḥah, was rabbi of Dessau.
