= Halberstadt D.II =

German WWI fighter

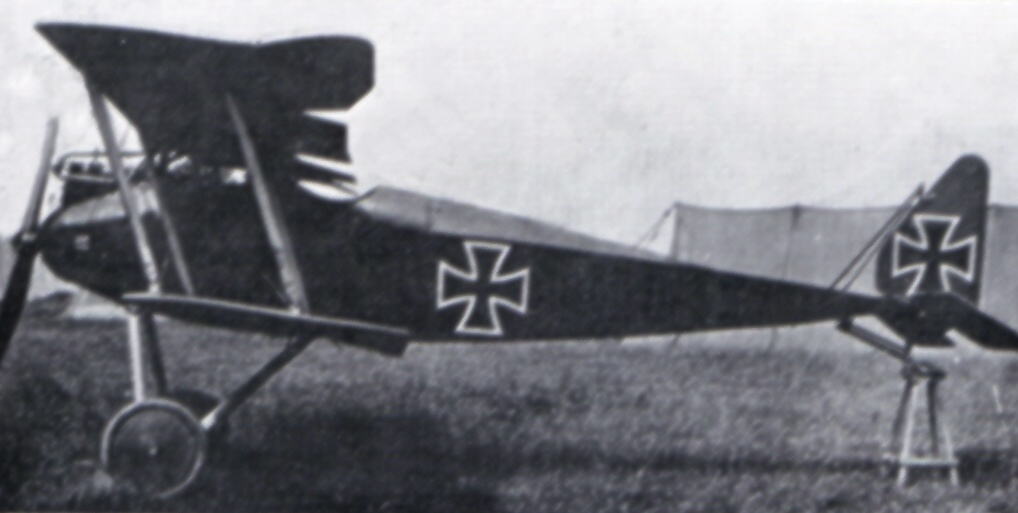
- Halberstadt D.II painted in a dark colour – allegedly flown by Boelcke

General information
- Type: Fighter
- Manufacturer: Halberstädter Flugzeugwerke also under licence to Aviatik; Hannoversche Waggonfabrik
- Designer: Karl Theis
- Primary user: Luftstreitkräfte
- Number built: 175

History
- Manufactured: 1916
- Introduction date: Early 1916
- First flight: Late 1915
- Retired: 1917

The Halberstadt D.II was a biplane fighter aircraft developed and manufactured by German aircraft company Halberstädter Flugzeugwerke. It was adopted by the Luftstreitkräfte (Imperial German Army Air Service) and served through the period of Allied air superiority in early 1916.

As the first biplane fighter aircraft to serve in combat for the German Empire, it had begun to be superseded in the Jagdstaffeln and other early German fighter units by the superior Albatros fighters in the second half of the year, although small numbers of Halberstadts continued in use well into 1917.

== Design and development ==
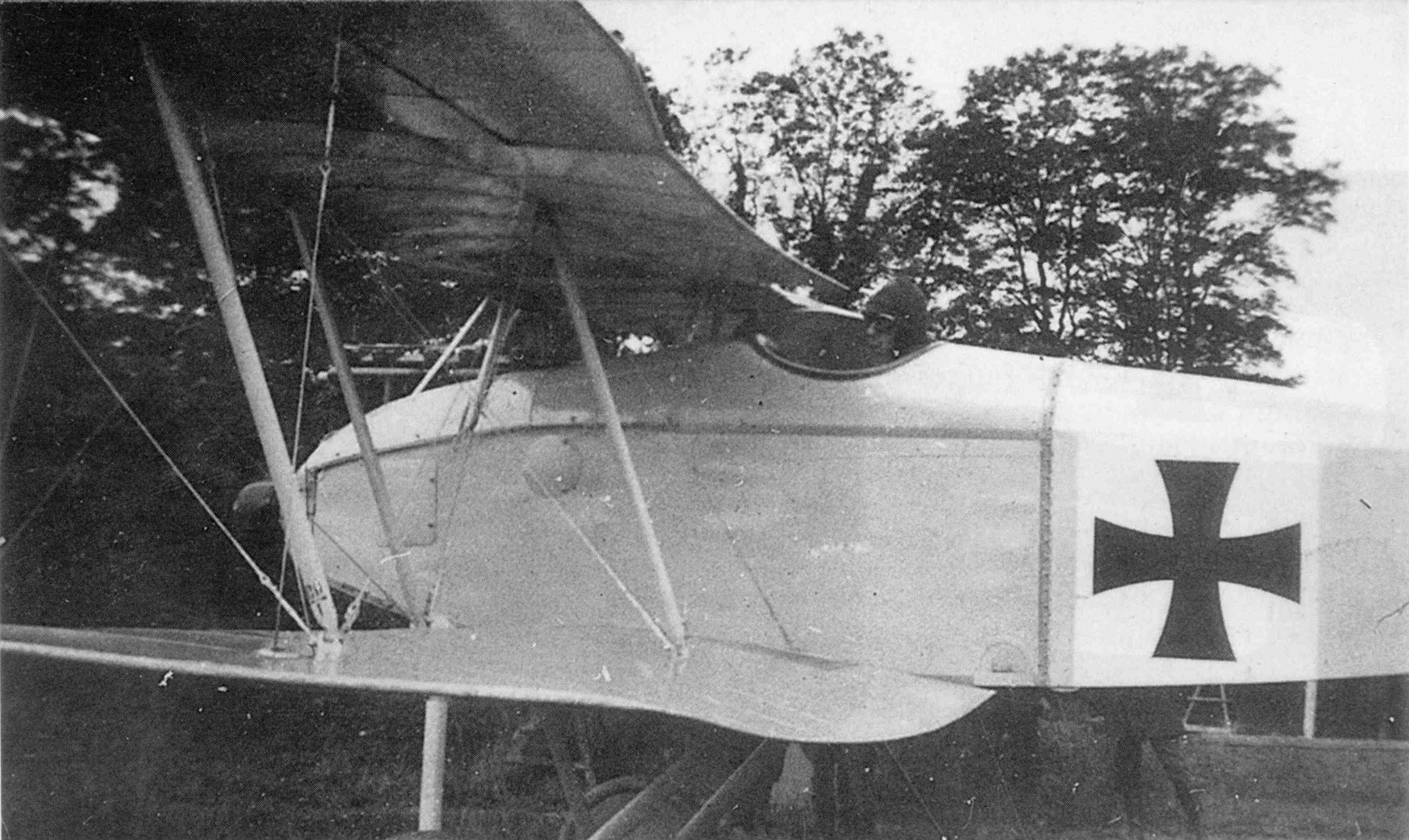
Ernst Freiherr von Althaus' Halberstadt D.II fighter from late 1916, showing characteristic lower wing trailing edge "droop"

The D.II was the production version of the experimental D.I. Differences between the D.I and D.II included an effort to lighten the aircraft to improve its performance; the latter also had staggered wings and a more powerful 120 hp (89 kW) Mercedes D.II engine. The side and frontal radiators that had been tried in the D.I were replaced by a wing mounted radiator, similar to the arrangement that was later used by the Albatros D.III and D.V. The pilot sat higher in his cockpit, improving his view over the top wing. This required a dorsal turtleback fairing over the rear fuselage, to improve its lines.

The two-bay wings were strongly braced but the trailing edge was composed of a wooden member, as opposed to the wire or cable common on many of the First World War-era German single-engined aircraft. Photographic evidence indicates that many examples were rigged with washout on the lower wings – giving the impression of a curved or twisted lower wing trailing edge. In some photos even the upper wings have a similar sort of "trailing edge droop" on the fixed section inboard of the ailerons.

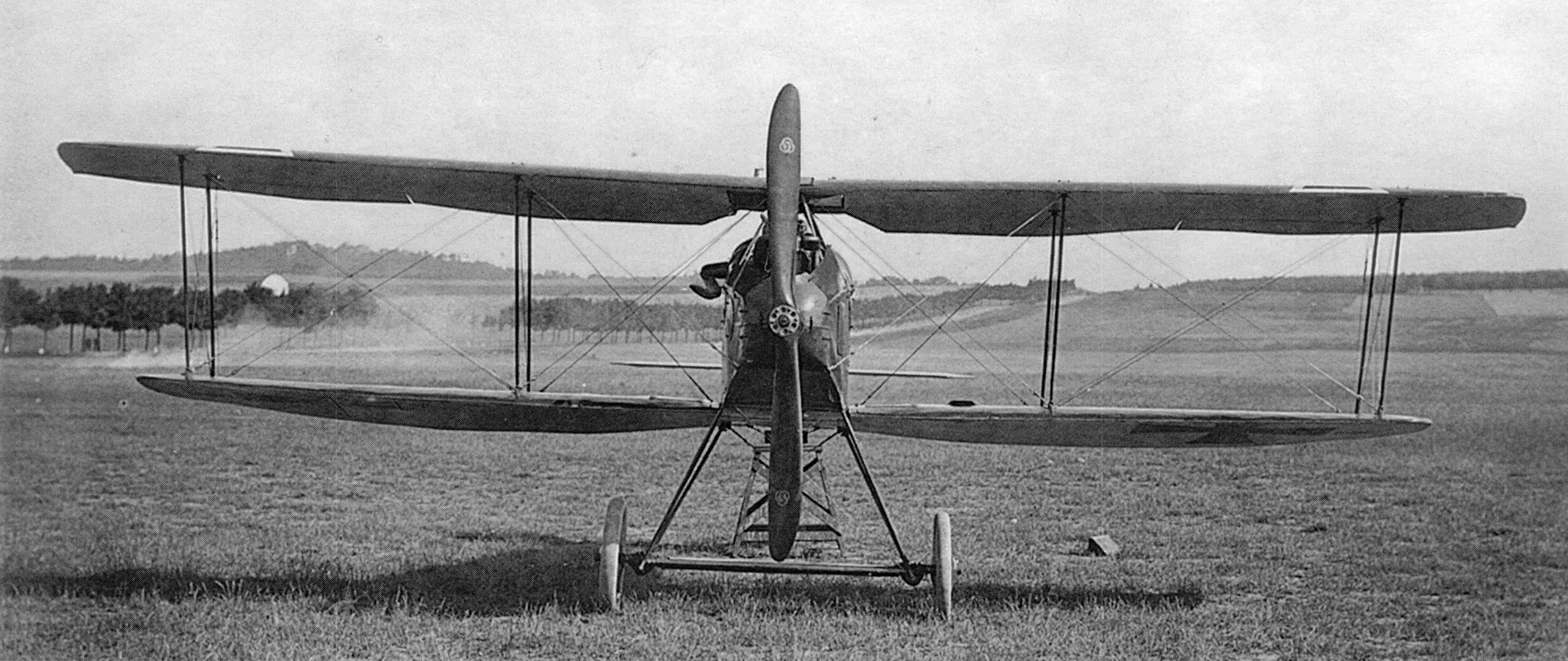
An allegedly "factory-fresh" Halberstadt D.II fighter, showing the trailing-edge "droop" on all four wing panels

Lateral control was by ailerons but the Morane-style empennage (common to Moranes and the Fokker and Pfalz types of the period) was retained. The inevitable result was extreme fore-and-aft sensitivity and poor control harmonisation. The D.II was nonetheless considered to be very manoeuvrable in skilled hands; it could reputedly be dived safely at high speed. A synchronised lMG 08 "Spandau" machine gun fired through the propeller arc.

If the only performance figures available for the type are accurate, the Halberstadt fighter's speed and climb were little better than the Eindecker but it earned the respect of Allied fighter pilots and was a preferred mount of the pilots of the early Jagdstaffeln, until the Albatros D.I became available. Halberstadts were retained or returned to service by some pilots during the early weeks of 1917, when the structural difficulties with the Albatros D.III first surfaced.

== Operational history ==
Like other early German fighter types, the D.II was at first supplied in ones and twos to the ordinary six-aircraft reconnaissance units (Feldflieger Abteilungen) of the Luftstreitkräfte (German Air Service) then from February 1916 through the summer of that year, gathered into small specialised fighter units – the Kampfeinsitzer-Kommandos or KEK units. When the first fighter Jagdstaffeln were formed in mid-1916, the Halberstadt was the best fighter available and was used by Oswald Boelcke to demonstrate his famous pioneering air fighting tactics (the Dicta Boelcke) to the new units (although he is also recorded as flying a Fokker D.III at this period). His Halberstadt was painted bright blue – one of the first documented instances of the gaudy personal finishes favoured by German fighter pilots.

For some reason, the Halberstadt-built D-series fighters bore no marked IdFlieg-issued military serial numbers anywhere on their exteriors. The licence-built Aviatik and Hannoversche Waggonfabrik (Hannover)-constructed examples of the Halberstadt D-series fighters usually had IdFlieg-issued serial numbers on their rear fuselage sides.

As Albatros fighters came into service, the Halberstadts were quickly replaced, although a few survived into early 1917. Manfred von Richthofen flew a red Halberstadt D.II for a few weeks in March 1917, after the spar of the lower wing of his Albatros D.III cracked in combat and scored 6 of his 80 victories with the type.

== Armament and wireless experiments ==
Believed to have been first tried within the first six months of 1916, future German rocketry pioneer Leutnant Rudolf Nebel, then flying as a fighter pilot with Jasta 5, one of the earliest German fighter squadrons within the Luftstreitkräfte, used a Halberstadt D.II aircraft of that unit in the first known German attempt at arming an aircraft with wing-mounted rockets as long-range armament. Leutnant Nebel used a set of four improvised tubular launchers, two mounted per side on the wings, with a signal rocket being fired from each tube for the unofficial trial. According to Leutnant Nebel's apparently "undated" account, he took off on a defensive mission when 25 Allied aircraft appeared in the air near Jasta 5's base. He managed to fire his improvised rocket armament at a distance of 100 m (330 ft) from the Allied fighter formation, in a "head-on" attack at it and scared one British pilot into surrendering as the British aircraft landed safely in German territory, with Leutnant Nebel landing no more than 20 m (66 ft) away, to take the prisoner. Just over a week later, Leutnant Nebel used his improvised rocket armament again and blew the propeller off an Allied aircraft, causing it to crash land.

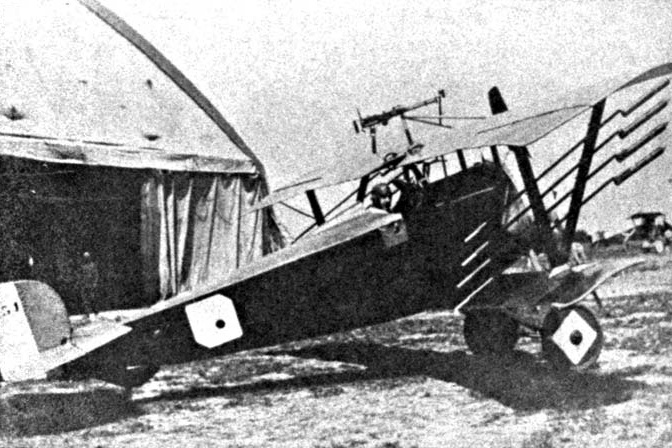
Nieuport 16 equipped with Le Prieur rockets

In mid-October 1916, another attempt was made to arm a Halberstadt D.II with rockets, this time for observation balloon attacks with a more formal method, using eight Le Prieur-like rockets mounted on the outer wing struts, the way that the French Nieuport 11 had been armed nearly a year earlier. Problems with the ignition system on the rockets prevented the system from being experimented with any further.

In late 1916, the Halberstadt D.II was the first known aeroplane for an official trial, with a special unit named the FT-Versuchsabteilung (Radio Telegraphy Experimental Detachment) with the "FT" possibly meaning Funk-Telegraphie, of air communications using radio communications (via Morse Code) in directing fighter aircraft. IdFlieg sanctioned the test, which resulted in the creation of a radio-telegraphy transceiver for the flight leader's aircraft, weighing 25–30 kg (55–66 lb) along with the battery, aircraft engine-driven generator and aerials. Receiving gear for the other aircraft in a combat formation was similarly devised, with the radio receiver weighing 12.5–15 kg (28–33 lb). By early 1917, the FT-Versuchsabteilung was making combat trials with the radio gear with Halberstadt D.III and D.V aircraft and by late September 1917 with Jagdgeschwader I unit commanded by Manfred von Richthofen, especially Jasta 4. Later trials using the more advanced Albatros D.III and Albatros D.Va fighters used the gear for the first attempts at an air-based version of ground-controlled interception of Allied bomber aircraft, using visual ground spotters as the ground component by the home defence Kampfeinsitzerstaffel units.

== Variants ==
Aviatik of Germany built the D.II under licence. It was originally known as the Aviatik D.I (not to be confused with their Austrian subsidiary's independently designed Aviatik (Berg) D.I) but was later called the Halberstadt D.II(Av).

The Halberstadt D.III differed from the D.II version in its substitution of the Argus As.II 90 kW (120 hp) straight-six engine, which differed from the usual Mercedes D.II powerplant in having its camshaft in the engine block and using pushrods to operate the overhead valves, rather than having a camshaft running atop all of the cylinders as in a single overhead cam engine. Fifty D.IIIs were built by Halberstadt, with the first 30 ordered in July 1916 and the last 20 ordered in August 1916.

The D.IV version, of which only three were built to an order placed in early March 1916, changed the wing bracing layout to a single bay, dispensed with the twin bracing struts for the "all moving" rudder surface and used a Benz Bz.III 110 kW (150 hp) straight-six engine for power, with a small conical spinner for better streamlining. Tested by IdFlieg in October 1916, this type was rejected for further evaluation due to a poor forward field of view for the pilot.

The D.V was a less radical departure from the earlier D.II and differed from the D.II in having its four-member cabane strut structure supporting a central panel for the upper wing, rather than both upper wing panel's wing roots meeting along the centreline of the aircraft, for better forward pilot vision. It also used the D.III version's Argus As.II engine and changed the mounting position of the aircraft's 7.92 mm (0.312 in) lMG 08 machine gun from the right to the left side of the nose. A total of 57 D.V aircraft were built, from orders placed in October 1916 and January–June 1917, with 31 of these being sent to Germany's ally in the Central Powers, the Ottoman Empire.

== Operators ==
German Empire

- Luftstreitkräfte

Ottoman Empire

- Ottoman Air Force

== Specifications (D.II) ==
Data from German Combat Planes, Halberstadt Fighters-Classics of World War I Aviation, Volume 1

General characteristics

- Crew: 1
- Length: 7.3 m (23 ft 11 in)
- Wingspan: 8.8 m (28 ft 10 in)
- Height: 2.66 m (8 ft 9 in)
- Wing area: 23.6 m^{2} (254 sq ft)
- Empty weight: 519 kg (1,144 lb)
- Gross weight: 728.5 kg (1,606 lb)
- Powerplant: 1 × Mercedes D.II 6-cylinder water-cooled in-line piston engine, 90 kW (120 hp)
- Propellers: 2-bladed fixed-pitch propeller

Performance

- Maximum speed: 150 km/h (93 mph, 81 kn)
- Range: 250 km (160 mi, 130 nmi)
- Service ceiling: 4,000 m (13,000 ft)
- Time to altitude: * 1,000 m (3,300 ft) in 3 minutes 30 seconds
- 2,000 m (6,600 ft) in 8 minutes 30 seconds
- 3,000 m (9,800 ft) in 14 minutes 30 seconds
- 4,000 m (13,000 ft) in 22 minutes 30 seconds
- 5,000 m (16,000 ft) in 38 minutes 30 seconds
- Wing loading: 30 kg/m^{2} (6.1 lb/sq ft)

Armament

- Guns: 1 × forward-firing 7.92 mm (.312 in) lMG 08 "Spandau" machine gun

== See also ==
Related lists

- List of military aircraft of Germany
