= Halberstadt D.I =

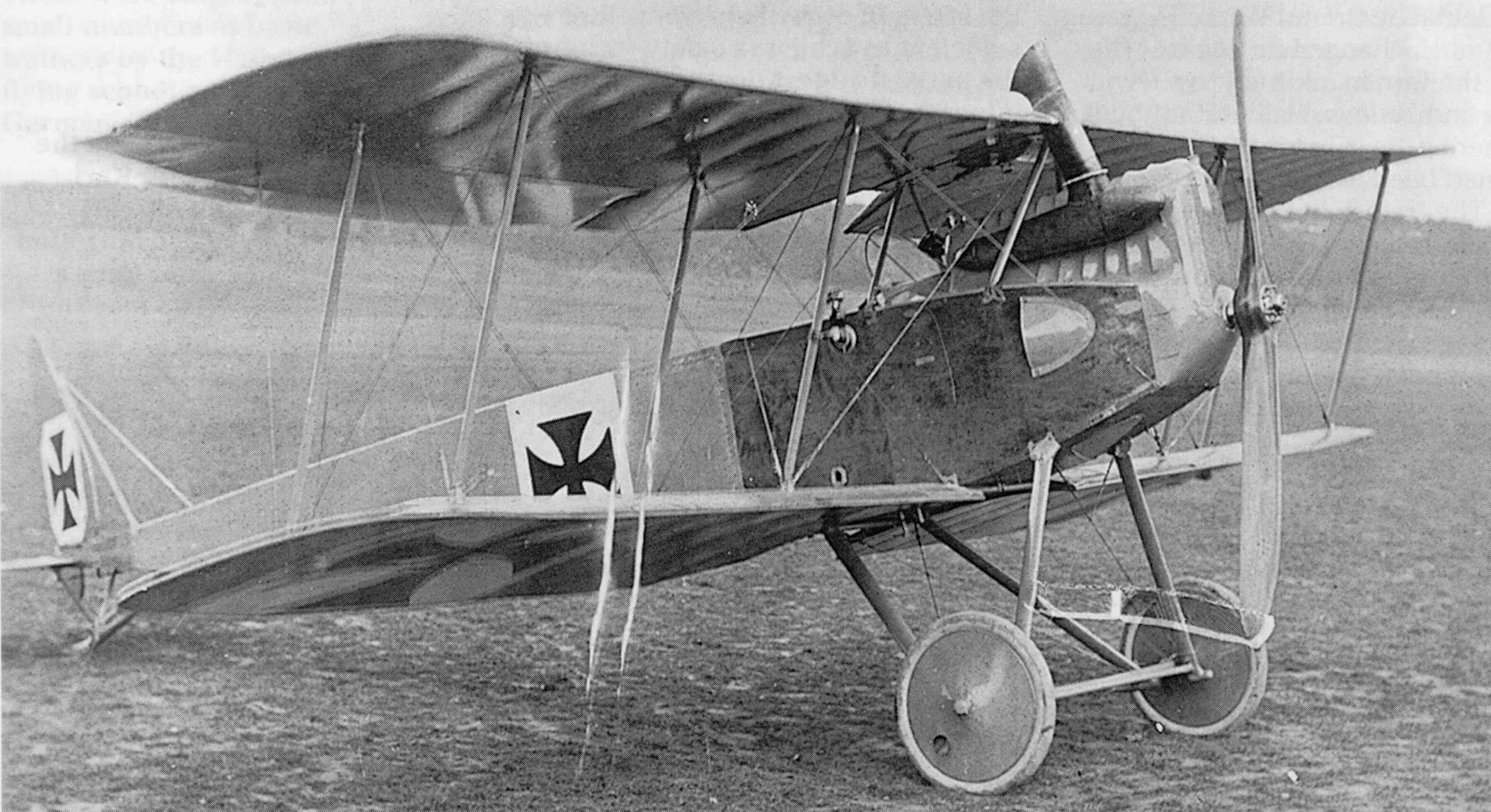
- Second prototype Halberstadt D.I with nose radiator

General information
- Type: Fighter prototype
- National origin: Germany
- Manufacturer: Halberstädter Flugzeugwerke
- Number built: 2

History
- First flight: Late Autumn 1915

The Halberstadt D.I was a prototype fighter aircraft built in Germany in 1916 as a scaled down version of the firm's earlier B.II two seater. It was a conventional, two-bay biplane with staggered wings of nearly equal span and fixed, tailskid undercarriage. The engine was the same Mercedes D.I that was fitted to the B.II, and a single machine gun was fitted. Two prototypes were evaluated by the Idflieg, their performance being found inadequate. The modifications required to bring the aircraft up to an acceptable standard would result in the Halberstadt D.II later the same year.

== Specifications ==
General characteristics

- Crew: one pilot
- Wingspan: 8.80 m (28 ft 10 in)
- Wing area: 23.6 m^{2} (254 sq ft)
- Empty weight: 550 kg (1,210 lb)
- Gross weight: 740 kg (1,630 lb)
- Powerplant: 1 × Mercedes D.I , 75 kW (100 hp)

Armament

- 1 × fixed, forward-firing 7.92 mm (.312 in) MG 08 machine gun
