= Halberstädter Flugzeugwerke =

German aircraft manufacturer, 1912 to 1932

Halberstadt
- Industry: Aircraft manufacture
- Founded: 9 April 1912; 114 years ago in Halberstadt, Province of Saxony, Germany
- Defunct: 1932

Halberstädter Flugzeugwerke or Halberstadt was a German aircraft manufacturer. It was formed on 9 April 1912 under the name Deutsche Bristol Werke Flugzeug-Gesellschaft mbH in Halberstadt, Province of Saxony.

== History ==
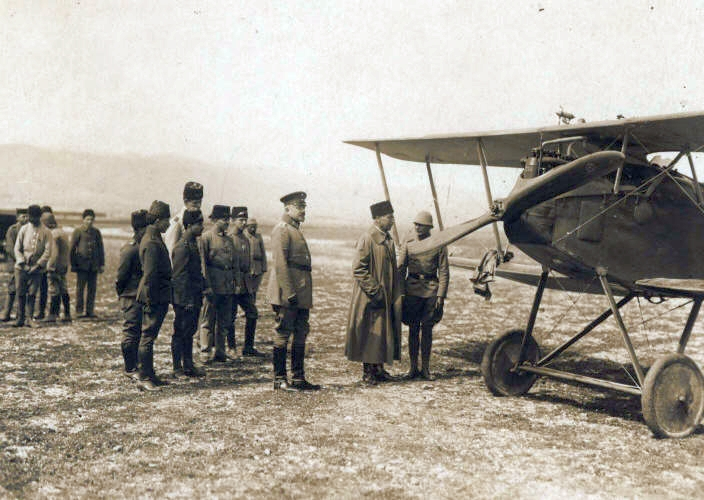
Flying Ace Hans-Joachim Buddecke next to his Halberstadt D.V, with General Otto Liman von Sanders, Turkey, 1917

The British-German joint venture initially produced planes according to the system by the British and Colonial Aeroplane Company, Ltd such as Bristol Boxkites and Bristol Prier monoplanes, but soon expanded into their developments. In September 1913 the company was renamed Halberstädter Flugzeugwerke GmbH. The chief designers were Hans Burkhardt, who later transferred to Gothaer Waggonfabrik, and the technical director and chief engineer was Karl Theiss.

The company built more than 1,700 reconnaissance aircraft (C type) and 85 fighter planes (D type), which served in the Luftstreitkräfte (German Air Force) during World War I. When German aircraft production was prohibited according to the 1919 Treaty of Versailles, the company, renamed Berlin-Halberstädter Industriewerke AG resorted to the production of agricultural machines and the repair of Reichsbahn railroad cars. Insolvency proceedings were opened in 1926; the Halberstadt factory premises were used by Junkers from 1935.

== Aircraft ==
Besides license-built two-seat observation/flight school aircraft (Halberstadt A.II), Halberstadt produced scout planes, ground attack aircraft, and fighters:

=== Halberstadt B types ===
B-type planes were dual-seated unarmed reconnaissance aircraft built in 1914/15. The biplanes were equipped with Oberursel-Gnome rotary engines, later (B.II and B.III) with Mercedes six-cylinder straight engines.

- Halberstadt B.I
- Halberstadt B.II
- Halberstadt B.III

=== Halberstadt C types ===
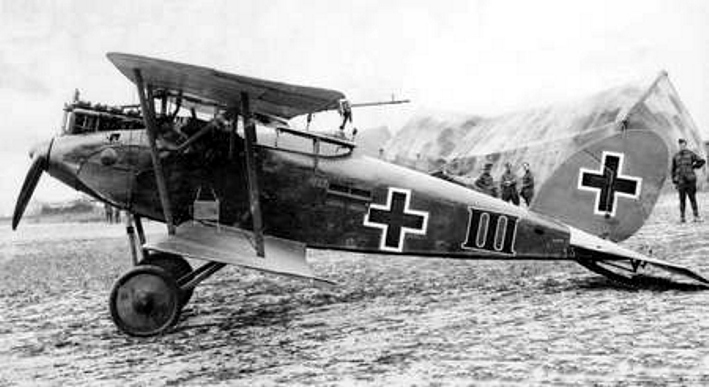
Captured Halberstadt CL.II at Flesselles, France, June 1918

==== Reconnaissance aircraft ====
Two-seater reconnaissance aircraft with water-cooled six-cylinder engines with 200 hp to 220 hp and a top speed of up to 170 kilometres per hour (110 mph). First flight C.I in May 1916, C.III end of 1916:

- Halberstadt C.I
- Halberstadt C.III
- Halberstadt C.V
- Halberstadt C.VII
- Halberstadt C.VIII
- Halberstadt C.IX

==== Ground attack aircraft ====
Two-seater ground attack aircraft with water-cooled six-cylinder engines with 160 HP to 185 HP, CL.IV 100 HP, and a top speed of up to 165 kilometres per hour (103 mph). First flight CL.II around February 1917, CL.IV early 1918:

- Halberstadt CL.II
- Halberstadt CL.IV
- Halberstadt CLS.I

=== Halberstadt D types ===
Fighter planes D.I to D.V: single-seat biplane fighters with water-cooled six-cylinder engines with 100 hp to 150 hp and a top speed of up to 145 kilometres per hour (90 mph). First flight D.I in February 1916, D.II end of 1916, and D.V beginning of 1917:

- Halberstadt D.I
- Halberstadt D.II
- Halberstadt D.III
- Halberstadt D.IV
- Halberstadt D.V

=== Large aircraft ===
A prototype medium bomber

- Halberstadt G.I
