= Fokker D.III =

1916 German single-seat fighter aircraft

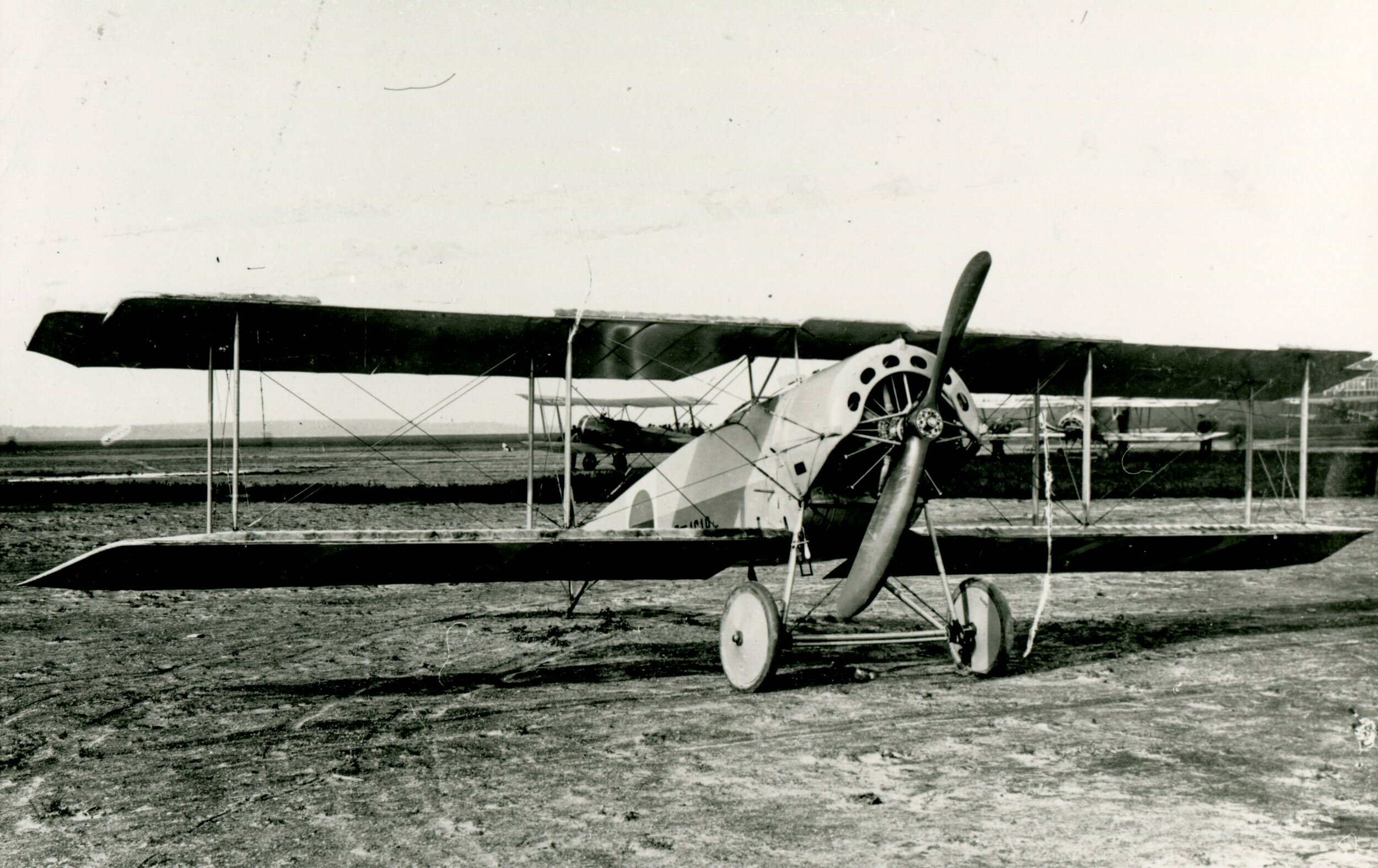
- Fokker D.III in Luchtvaartafdeling markings

General information
- Type: Fighter
- Manufacturer: Fokker-Flugzeugwerke
- Designer: Martin Kreutzer
- Primary user: Luftstreitkräfte

History
- Manufactured: 210

The Fokker D.III (Fokker designation M.19) was a German single-seat fighter aircraft of World War I. It saw limited frontline service before being withdrawn from combat in December 1916.

== Design and development ==
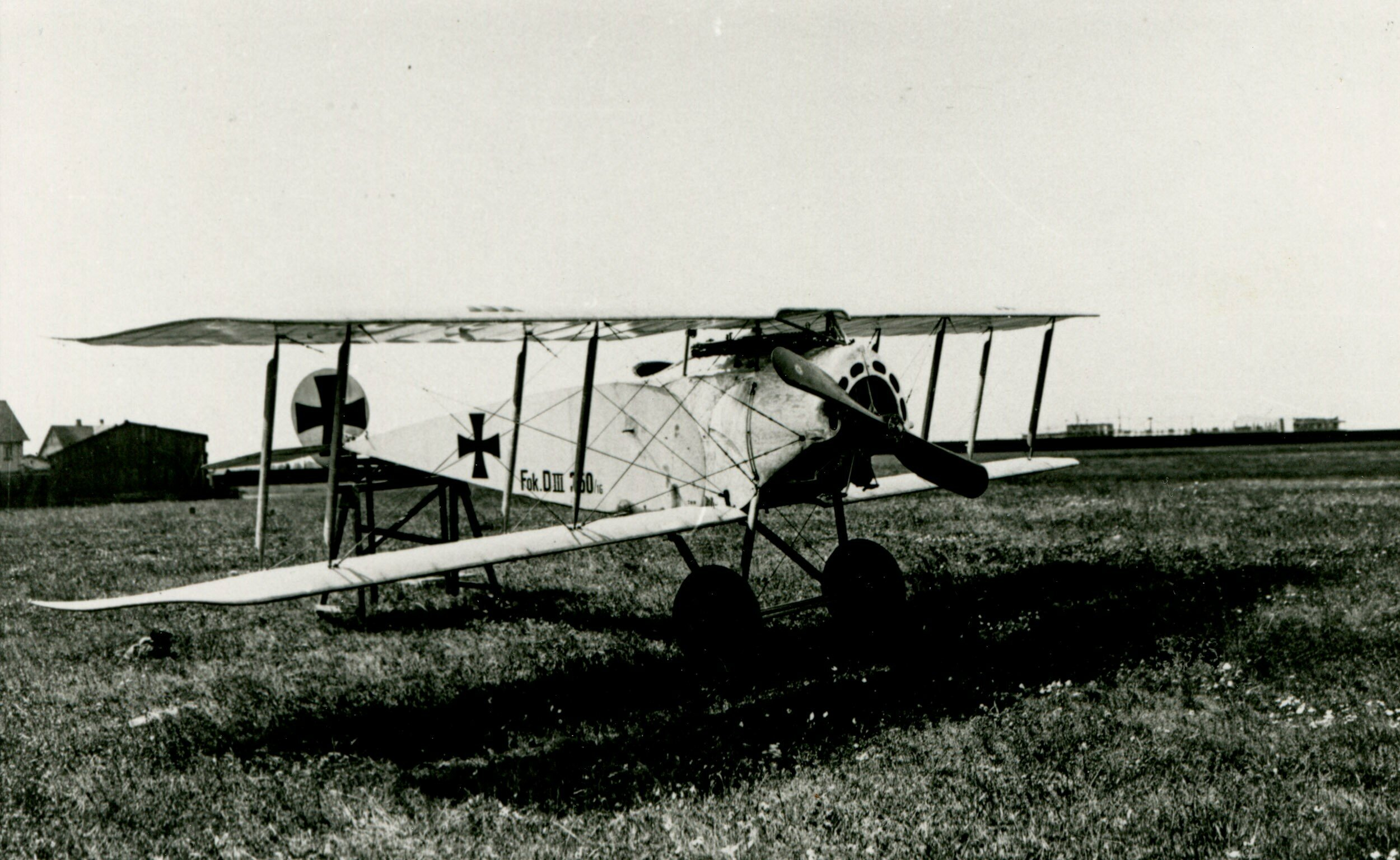
The M.19 prototype.

The M.19 began as an effort to improve the performance of the Fokker D.II (Fokker designation M.17). The M.19 featured the Oberursel U.III 14-cylinder, two-row rotary engine, combined with the two-bay wing cellule of the Fokker D.I. The U.III engine, first used in the Fokker E.IV, required a revised fore-and-aft mount and a strengthened fuselage. The prototype M.19 arrived at Adlershof for testing on 20 July 1916. Idflieg issued a production order for 50 aircraft at that time, followed by orders for an additional 60 aircraft in August and 100 in November. The new aircraft was designated D.III by Idflieg.

== Operational history ==
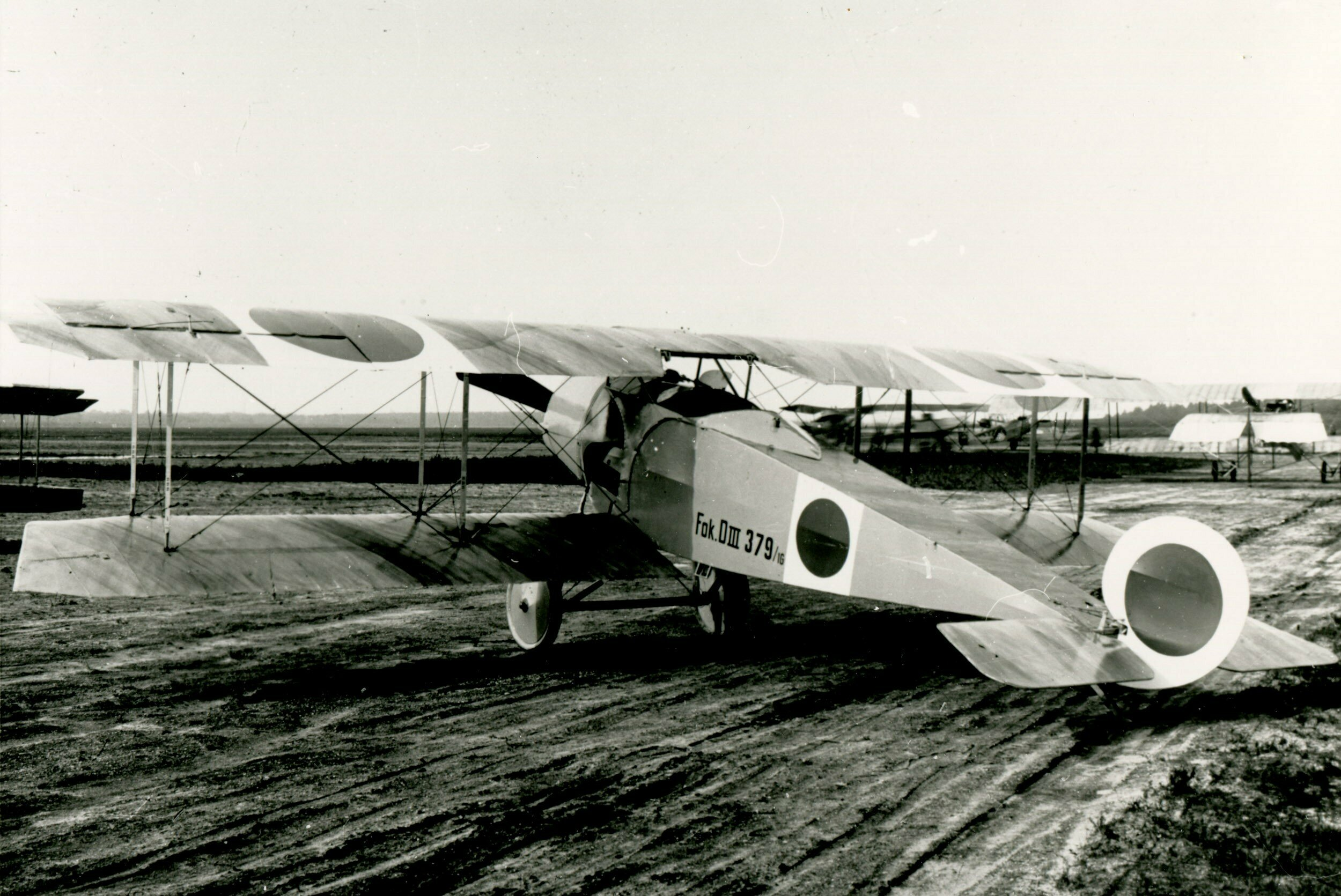

The first seven production aircraft were delivered on 1 September 1916. On that date, two D.III aircraft were ferried from Armee Flug Park 1 to Jagdstaffel 2 at Bertincourt. Oswald Boelcke received serial 352/16 and obtained seven victories in it between 2 September and 15 September.

While the D.III offered better performance than the D.I and D.II, Boelcke nevertheless found the D.III to be too slow. The D.III was plagued by its U.III engine, which wore out quickly and was difficult to manufacture. Low compression resulted in poor performance at altitude and cooling of the rear row of cylinders proved problematic. Moreover, the D.III offered indifferent maneuverability. On Boelcke's recommendation, the D.III was withdrawn from heavily contested sectors of the Western Front, but it continued to serve in quieter sectors.

In early October 1916, evaluation of Fokker's M.21 prototype at Adlershof revealed poor construction and workmanship. In response, Idflieg directed that a production D.III be tested for quality control purposes. In November 1916, serial 369/16 was disassembled and tested to destruction at Adlershof. While the wings proved acceptable, the fuselage and tail surfaces failed to meet specifications. Idflieg reprimanded Fokker for his firm's substandard construction practices, but permitted D.III production to continue. The Kogenluft, however, forbade the use of Fokker aircraft for frontline duties.

Fokker built 210 D.III aircraft at its Schwerin factory before production ceased in the spring of 1917. Late production aircraft replaced the wing-warping system with horn-balanced ailerons on the upper wing. Though unsuitable for frontline service, the D.III continued to serve in home defense units until late 1917. In October 1917, Germany supplied 10 D.IIIs to the Netherlands. These aircraft remained in service with the Luchtvaartafdeling until 1921.

Boelcke's D.III, serial 352/16, survived the war to be displayed at the Zeughaus museum in Berlin. The aircraft was destroyed by an Allied bombing raid in 1943.

== Operators ==
German Empire

- Luftstreitkräfte

Netherlands

- Luchtvaartafdeling

== Specifications ==
General characteristics

- Crew: one pilot
- Length: 6.30 m (20 ft 8 in)
- Wingspan: 9.05 m (29 ft 8 in)
- Height: 2.55 m (8 ft 4 in)
- Wing area: 20.0 m^{2} (215 sq ft)
- Empty weight: 430 kg (948 lb)
- Gross weight: 710 kg (1,565 lb)
- Powerplant: 1 × Oberursel U.III , 120 kW (160 hp)

Performance

- Maximum speed: 160 km/h (100 mph, 87 kn)
- Range: 220 km (137 mi, 119 nmi)
- Service ceiling: 4,700 m (15,420 ft)
- Rate of climb: 4.8 m/s (940 ft/min)

Armament

- 2 × fixed 7.92 mm (.312 in) lMG 08 Spandau machine guns
