= Halberstadt CL.II =

German military aircraft in World War I

CL.II
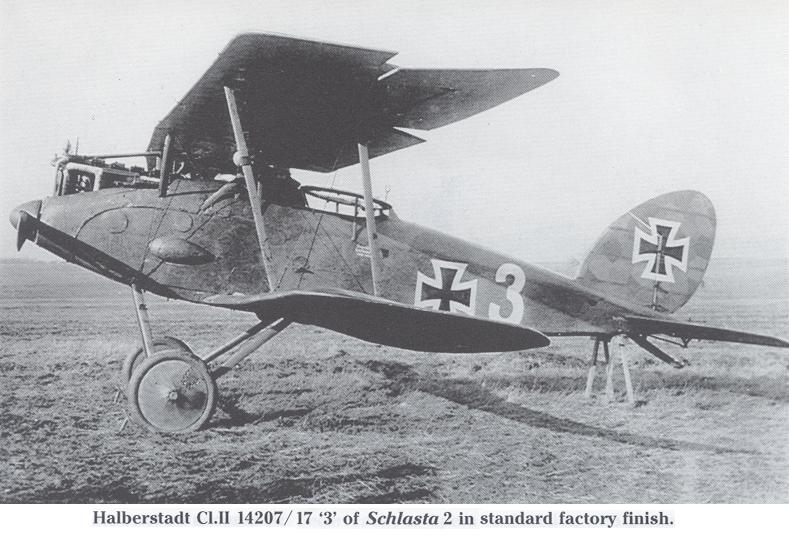
- German Halberstadt CL.II 14207/17 "3" of Schlasta 2. Note fairing for radio generator

General information
- Type: Escort Fighter/Ground Attack Aircraft
- Manufacturer: Halberstädter Flugzeugwerke
- Designer: Karl Theis
- Primary user: Imperial German Army Air Service
- Number built: 900

History
- First flight: 1917

The Halberstadt CL.II was a German two-seat escort fighter/ground attack aircraft of World War I. It served in large numbers with the German Luftstreitkräfte (Imperial German Army Air Service) in 1917-18.

== Development and design ==
Early in 1917, Idflieg, the German Army Inspectorate of Flying Troops, developed a requirement for a new type of two-seat aircraft, smaller than the existing C-type aircraft. This type, known as CL-type (Light C type) aircraft, was used to equip Schutzstaffeln (Protection flights) to escort reconnaissance aircraft. Halberstadt developed an aircraft based on its earlier, unsuccessful Halberstadt D.IV single-seat fighter to meet this requirement. Originally designated the Halberstadt C.II, it was redesignated the Halberstadt CL.II when the CL designation was applied.

The CL.II was a single-engined biplane with an all-wooden structure. The fuselage was covered with thin plywood panelling. It housed the crew of two in a single cockpit, with the observer's 7.92 mm (.312 in) machine gun being mounted on an elevated gun ring, giving a good field of fire, allowing downward fire at targets on the ground. A tray large enough to hold ten stick grenades was attached to the left side of the fuselage. The single-bay wings were fabric-covered, with a swept upper wing.

The aircraft had provisions for a wireless radio. When needed, the radio and antenna could be installed in the observer's cockpit, and a generator, that would also supply current for heated flight suits, could easily be installed. The generator was directly driven by a pulley on the engine and mounted on the left side with a teardrop shaped fairing covering it. With the generator removed, a flat panel would be fitted instead.

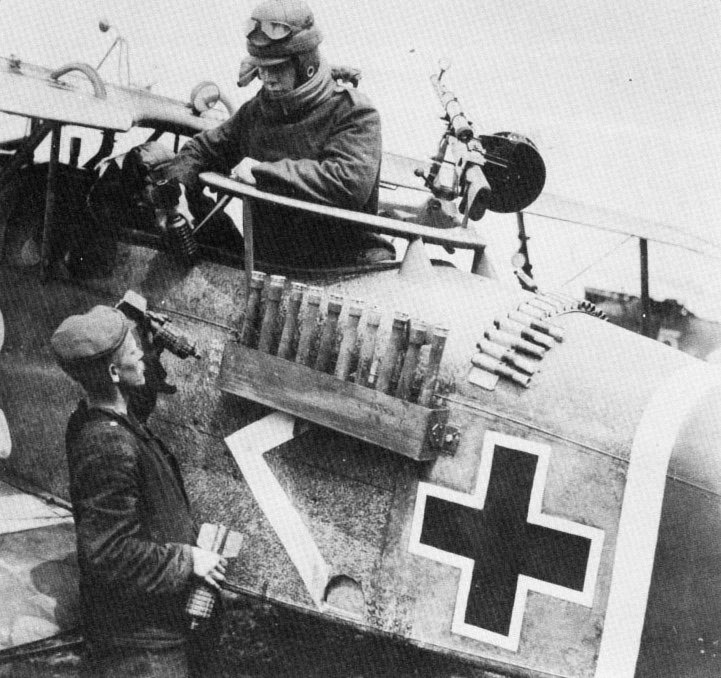
Loading up with Wurfgranaten 15 bombs (note ten stick grenades)

The CL.II passed its Typenprüfung (type-test) on 7 May 1917, which resulted in production orders being placed. Halberstadt built 700 CL.IIs by the time production shifted to the improved CL.IV in mid-1918. A further 200 CL.II aircraft were built in 1918 by the Bayerische Flugzeug-Werke (BFW).

== Operational history ==
The CL.II entered service in August 1917 and proved highly successful; its excellent manoeuvrability, rate of climb and promising field of fire for its armament allowed it to match opposing single-seat fighters. It also proved well suited to close support, which became the primary role of the CL-type aircraft, the units operating them being re-designated Schlachtstaffeln (Battle flights).

Ground support by the Schlachtstaffeln proved very effective, being used to support German attacks and disrupt enemy attacks. An early example of the successful use of CL-type aircraft in the ground attack role was during the German counterattack on 30 November 1917 during the Battle of Cambrai, where they were a significant factor in the German performance.

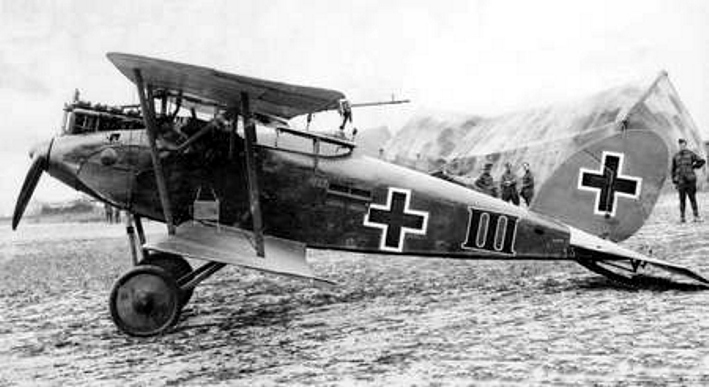
The captured German Halberstadt CL.II (serial 15342/17) flown by Gefreiter Kuesler and Vizefeldwebel Mullenbach on 9 June 1918 when they were forced to land at the aerodrome of 3 Squadron Australian Flying Corps at Flesselles, Somme (France). The AFC aircrew were Lieutenant R.J. Armstrong and Lieutenant F.J. Mart flying in Royal Aircraft Factory R.E.8 (serial D4689).

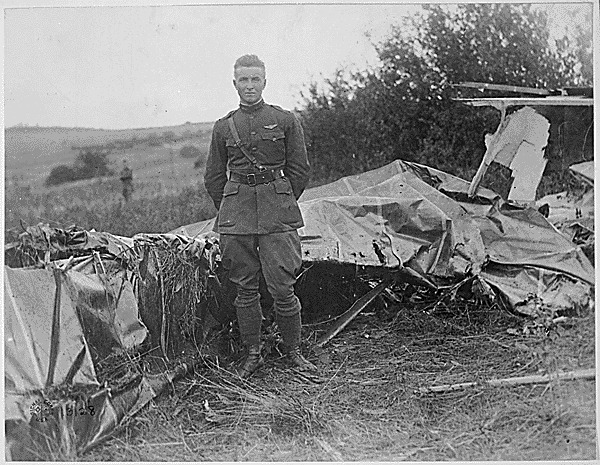
Frank Luke with a shot down Halberstadt of Flieger Abteilung 36 on 18 September 1918

The success of the German tactics at Cambrai, including the use of close air support, resulted in the Germans assembling large numbers of CL-types in support of the Spring Offensive in March 1918, with 38 Schlachtstaffeln (equipped with the CL.II, CL.IV and the Hannover CL.III) available, of which 27 were deployed against the British forces during the initial attack Operation Michael The CL.II continued in service until the end of the War.

== Survivors ==
The only existing Halberstadt CL.II is exhibited in the Polish Aviation Museum in Kraków. This unique plane served as the personal aircraft of the Commander of Luftstreitkräfte general Ernst von Hoeppner.

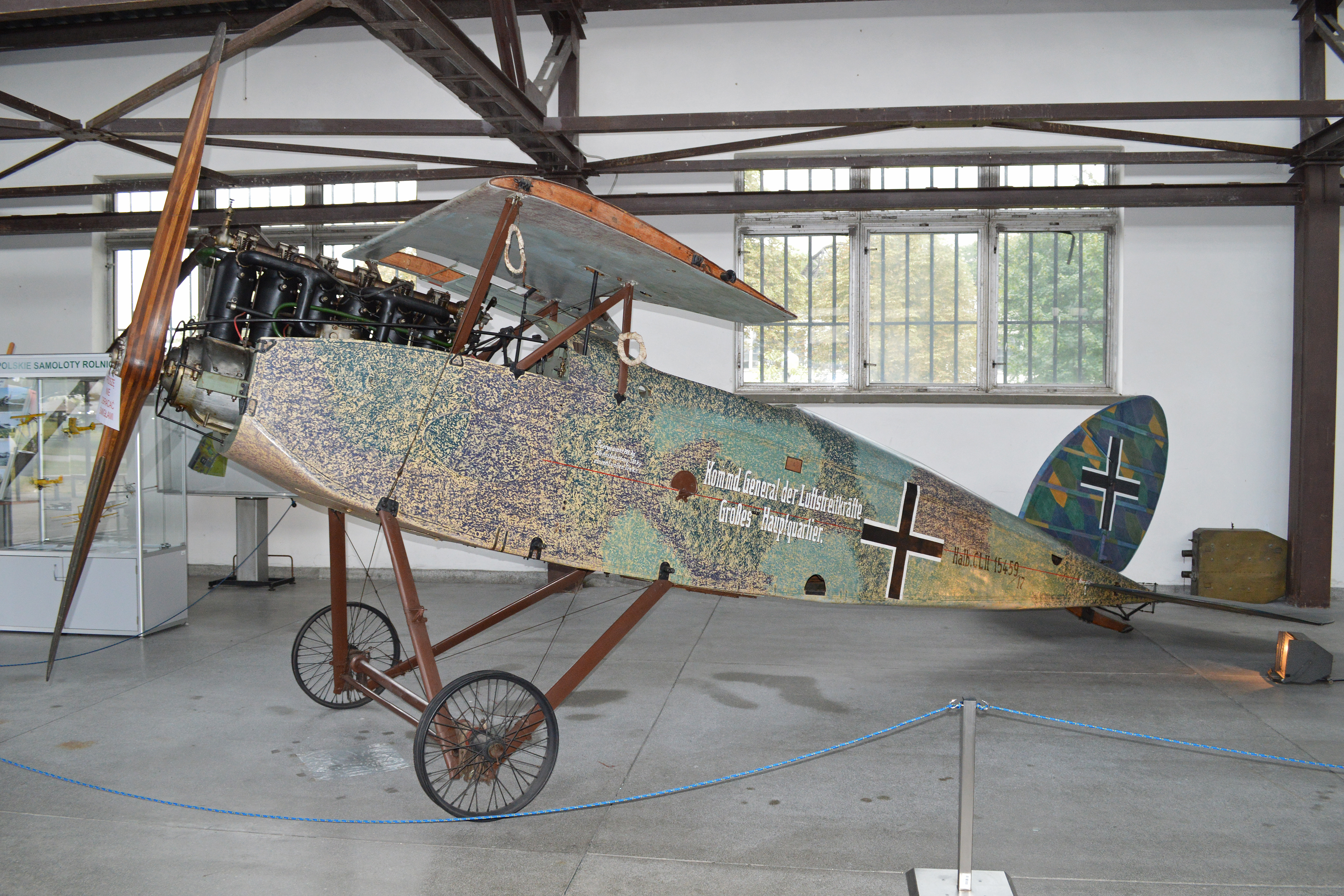
CL.II 15459-17 of General von Hoeppner

== Variants ==
CL.II
Main production type, powered by Mercedes D.III engine of 110 kW (150 hp).
CL.IIa
CL.II fitted with BMW IIIa engine. Few produced for evaluation purposes.

== Operators ==
German Empire

- Luftstreitkräfte

Lithuania (postwar)

- Lithuanian Air Force

Poland (postwar)

- Polskie Siły Powietrzne

== Specifications (CL.II) ==
Data from German Aircraft of the First World War

General characteristics

- Crew: 2
- Length: 7.3 m (23 ft 11 in)
- Wingspan: 10.77 m (35 ft 4 in)
- Height: 2.75 m (9 ft 0 in)
- Wing area: 27.5 m^{2} (296 sq ft)
- Empty weight: 773 kg (1,704 lb)
- Gross weight: 1,133 kg (2,498 lb)
- Powerplant: 1 × Mercedes D.III 6-cylinder water-cooled in-line piston engine, 120 kW (160 hp)

Performance

- Maximum speed: 165 km/h (103 mph, 89 kn) at 5,000 m (16,000 ft)
- Endurance: 3 hours
- Service ceiling: 5,090 m (16,700 ft)
- Time to altitude: 1,000 m (3,300 ft) in 5 minutes; 5,000 m (16,000 ft) in 39.5 minutes
- Wing loading: 41.2 kg/m^{2} (8.4 lb/sq ft)
- Power/mass: 0.11 kW/kg (0.06 hp/lb)

Armament

- Guns:
- 1 × 7.92 mm (0.312 in) LMG 08/15 "Spandau" machine gun, synchronized
- 1 × 7.92 mm (0.312 in) Parabellum MG14 machine gun, on ring mount for observer
- Bombs:
- 10 x stick grenades
- Up to 5 × 10 kg (22 lb) Wurfgranaten 15 trench mortar fragmentation bombs

== See also ==
Related development

- Halberstadt CL.IV

Aircraft of comparable role, configuration, and era

- Hannover CL.III
- Bristol Fighter
