= Halberstadt C.V =

World War I German single-engined reconnaissance biplane

C.V
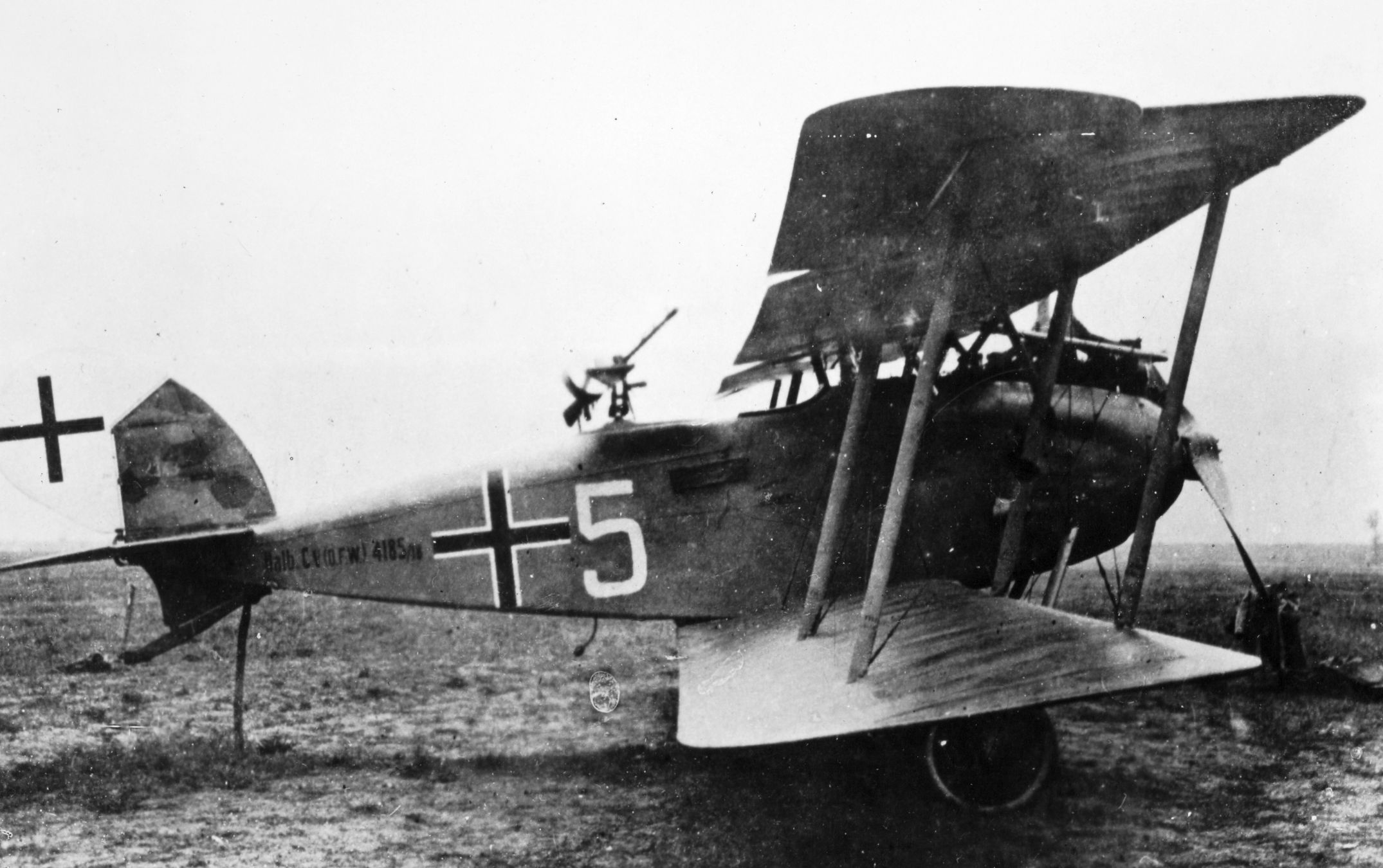
- a Halberstadt C.V (Side view)

General information
- Type: Reconnaissance
- Manufacturer: Halberstädter Flugzeugwerke
- Primary user: Luftstreitkräfte

History
- Introduction date: June 1918
- First flight: March 1918
- Developed from: Halberstadt C.III

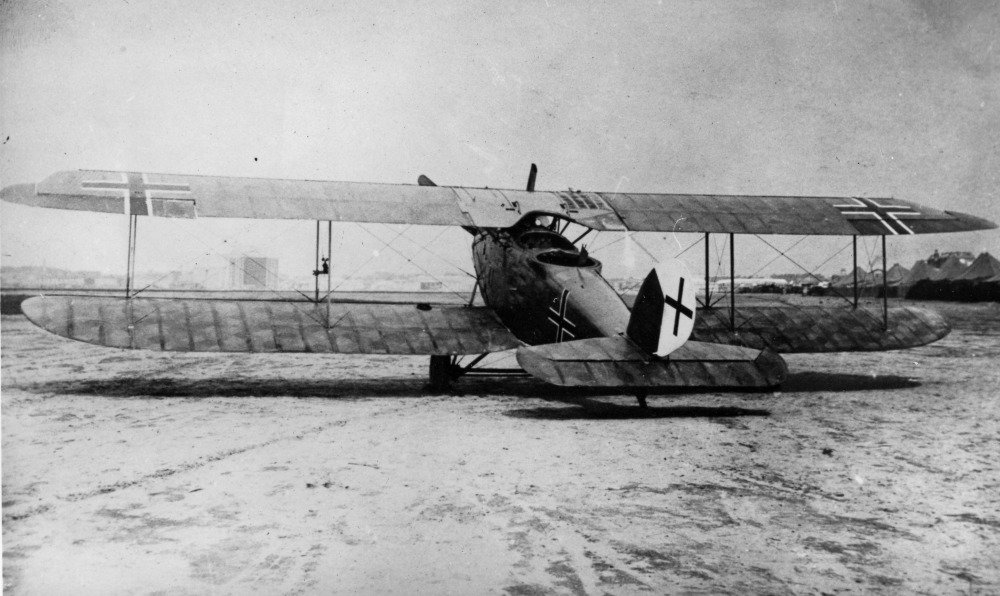
Halberstadt C.V

The Halberstadt C.V was a German single-engined reconnaissance biplane of World War I, built by Halberstädter Flugzeugwerke. Derived from the Halberstadt C.III, with a more powerful supercharged 160 kW (220 hp) Benz Bz.IVü engine, it saw service only in the final months of the war. Cameras were mounted in the observer's cockpit floor.

The aircraft had very good flight characteristics, especially maneuverability and rate of climb, and was among best German World War I aircraft in its class. First aircraft appeared in front in late June 1918.

== Operators ==
Estonia

- Estonian Air Force - Postwar.

German Empire

- Luftstreitkrafte

Latvia

- Latvian Air Force - Postwar.

Lithuania

- Lithuanian Air Force - Postwar, 10 aircraft and 6 unlicensed copies, used from 1919 to late 1920s

Poland

- Polish Air Force - 11 aircraft, used during Polish-Soviet War in 1919-1920

Soviet Union

- Soviet Air Force - 18 units acquired in 1922.

Switzerland

- Swiss Air Force

Ukraine

- West Ukrainian People's Republic Army

== Surviving aircraft ==
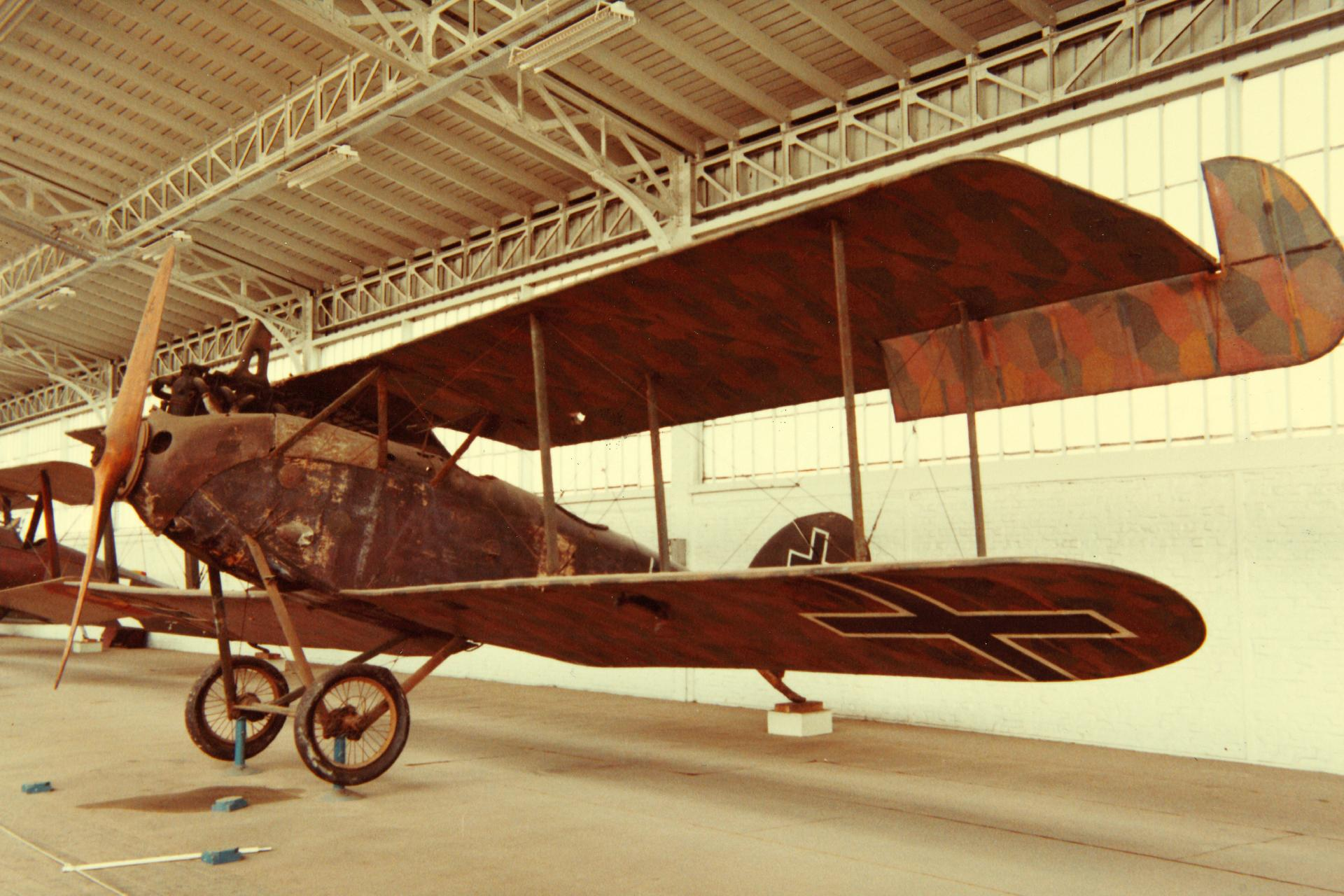
Halberstadt C.V in Brussels, Belgium

A single C.V (S/No. 3471/18) survives at the Musée Royal de l'Armée et d'Histoire Militaire in Brussels, Belgium.

== Specifications (C.V) ==
Data from German Aircraft of the First World War

General characteristics

- Crew: 2
- Length: 6.92 m (22 ft 8 in)
- Wingspan: 13.62 m (44 ft 8 in)
- Height: 3.36 m (11 ft 0 in)
- Wing area: 43 m^{2} (460 sq ft)
- Empty weight: 930 kg (2,050 lb)
- Gross weight: 1,635 kg (3,605 lb)
- Powerplant: 1 × Benz Bz.IVü 6-cyl. water-cooled in-line piston engine, 160 kW (220 hp)

Performance

- Maximum speed: 170 km/h (110 mph, 92 kn)
- Endurance: 3½ hours
- Service ceiling: 5,000 m (16,000 ft)
- Rate of climb: 10.42 m/s (2,051 ft/min)
- Time to altitude: ** 2,000 m (6,600 ft) in 3 minutes 12 seconds
  - 5,000 m (16,000 ft) in 23 minutes

Armament

- Guns: * 1x 7.92 mm (0.312 in) LMG 08/15 Spandau machine gun mounted in the forward fuselage port side
- 1x 7.92 mm (0.312 in) Parabellum machine gun on a flexible mounting in the rear cockpit
- up to 50 kg of bombs

== See also ==
Related lists

- List of military aircraft of Germany

== Bibliography ==
- Gerdessen, Frederik. "Estonian Air Power 1918 – 1945". Air Enthusiast, No. 18, April – July 1982. pp. 61–76. ISSN 0143-5450.
- Kabatek, Mateusz & Kulczynski, Fr. Robert SDB (2022). German Aircraft in Polish Service: Volume 1: Halberstadt Cl.II, Cl.IV, C.V; LVG C.VI; & Hannover Cl.V. Great War Aviation Centennial Series. Vol. 70. n.p.: Aeronaut Books. ISBN 978-1-953201-58-4.
