= Halberstadt CL.IV =

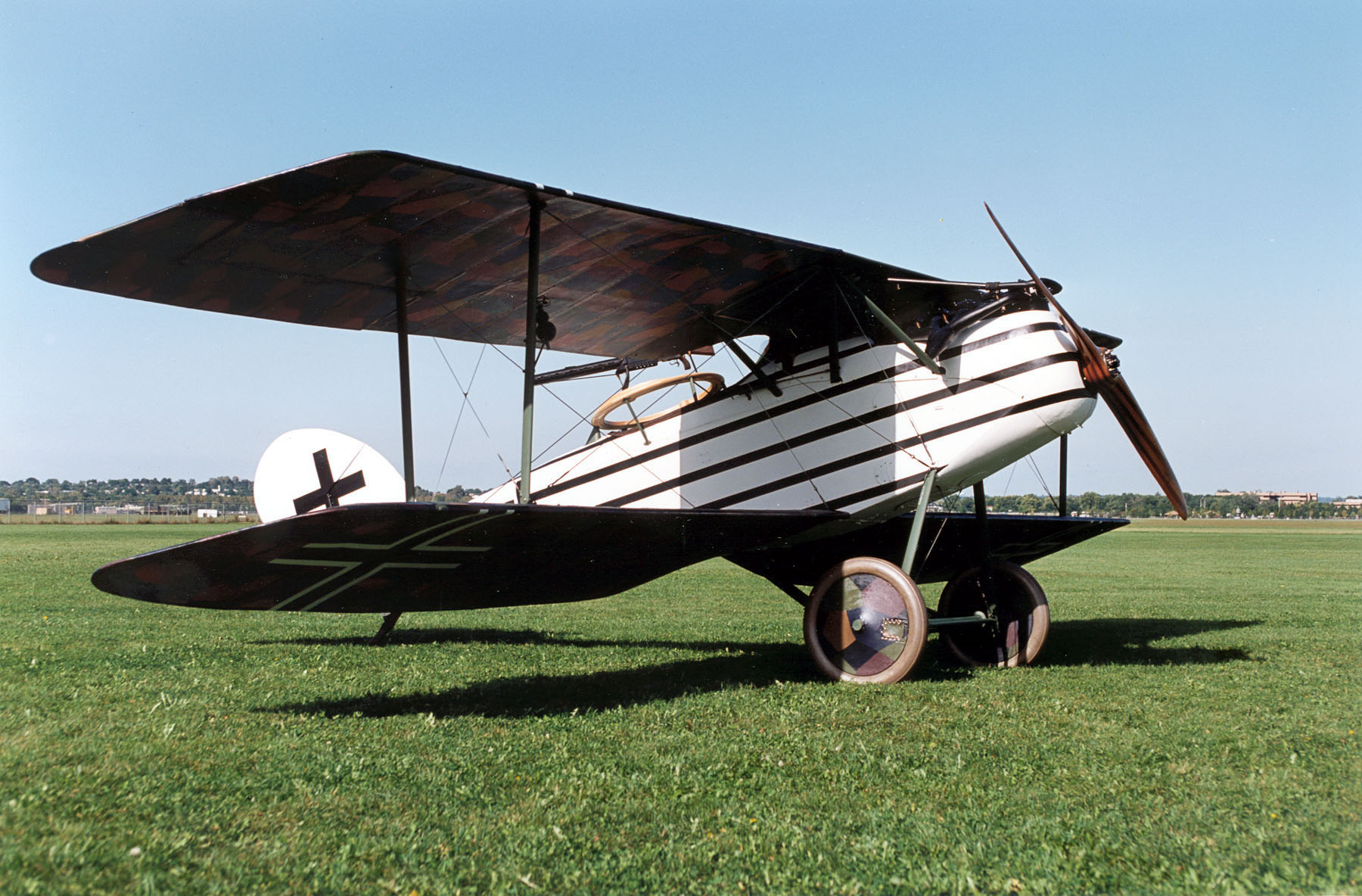

General information
- Type: Ground Attack Aircraft
- Manufacturer: Halberstädter Flugzeugwerke
- Designer: Karl Theis
- Primary user: Luftstreitkräfte

History
- Introduction date: 1918

The Halberstadt CL.IV is a German ground attack aircraft of World War I.

== Design and development ==
Karl Thies, chief designer of the Halberstädter Flugzeugwerke, G.m.b.H., designed the CL.IV as a replacement for the CL.II. As the CL.II had proven to be particularly effective in the ground support role, the focus of an improved version was to create a specific ground attack aircraft.

The new CL.IV featured a shorter, strengthened fuselage and a horizontal stabilizer of greater span and higher aspect ratio than that of the CL.II. These changes, along with a one-piece, horn-balanced elevator, gave the CL.IV much greater maneuverability than its predecessor. After tests were completed of the prototype in April 1918, at least 450 were ordered from Halberstadt, and an additional 250 aircraft from a subcontractor, LFG (Roland), as Halberstadt CL.IV(Rol).

== Operational history ==
The Halberstadt CL.IV was one of the most effective ground attack aircraft of World War I, relying on its good maneuverability to avoid ground fire. It appeared on the Western Front towards the end of the German offensives in 1918. Flights of four to six aircraft flew close support missions, at an altitude of less than one hundred feet, suppressing enemy infantry and artillery fire just ahead of the advancing German troops. After these late German offensives stalled, Halberstadt CL.IVs were used to disrupt advancing Allied offensives by striking at enemy troop assembly points and night sorties were also made against Allied airfields.

Towards the end of the war, on bright, moonlit nights, CL.IV squadrons attempted to intercept and destroy Allied bombers as they returned from their missions.

In 1921, the newly established German airline Luftverkehr Paul Strähle, established by flying ace Paul Strähle, operated three CL.IVs, converted to carry two passengers, operating them on services between Stuttgart and Konstanz, adding a route between Stuttgart and Nuremberg in 1922. They remained in use until 1923.

== Survivors ==
-c/n 4205, D-IBAO Militärhistorisches Museum Flugplatz Berlin-Gatow, RAF Gatow, Germany

-c/n 1447, s/n 4649/18, D-71 German Museum of Technology, Berlin, Germany

-s/n 8203 National Museum of the United States Air Force, Wright-Patterson Air Force Base, Dayton, Ohio

-s/n 8103/18 Steven F. Udvar-Hazy Center, Chantilly, Virginia

== Operators ==
German Empire

- Luftstreitkräfte

Germany

- Luftverkehr Paul Strähle

Estonia

- Estonian Air Force

Lithuania

- Lithuanian Air Force: 12 aircraft (No. 9432, 5814, 5831, 5909, 5915, 5920, 5937, 6589, 8176, 8192, 9409, 9486)

Poland

- Polish Air Force: 3 aircraft

Russian SFSR

- Russian Air Force

== Specifications ==
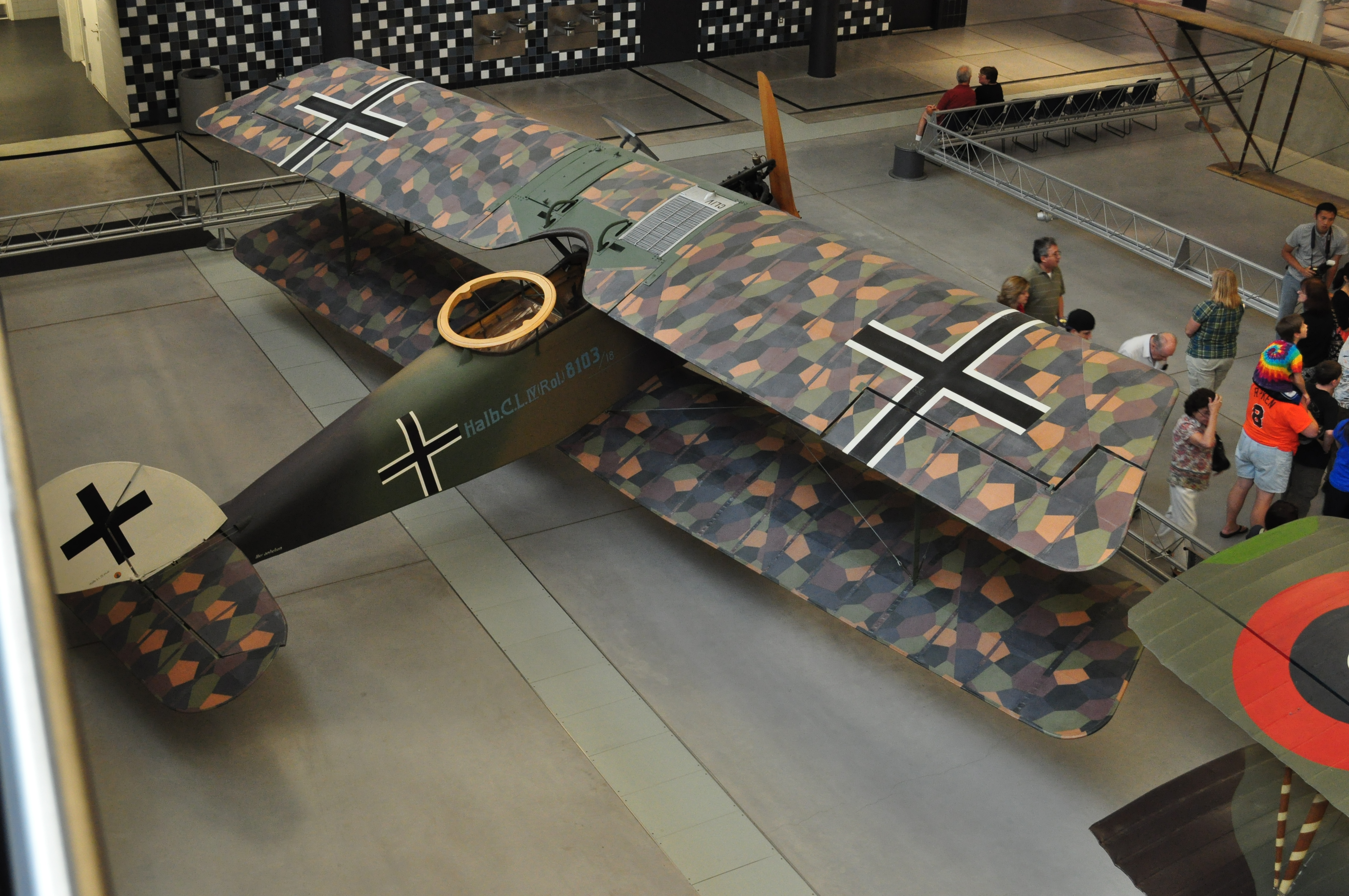
Halberstadt CL.IV

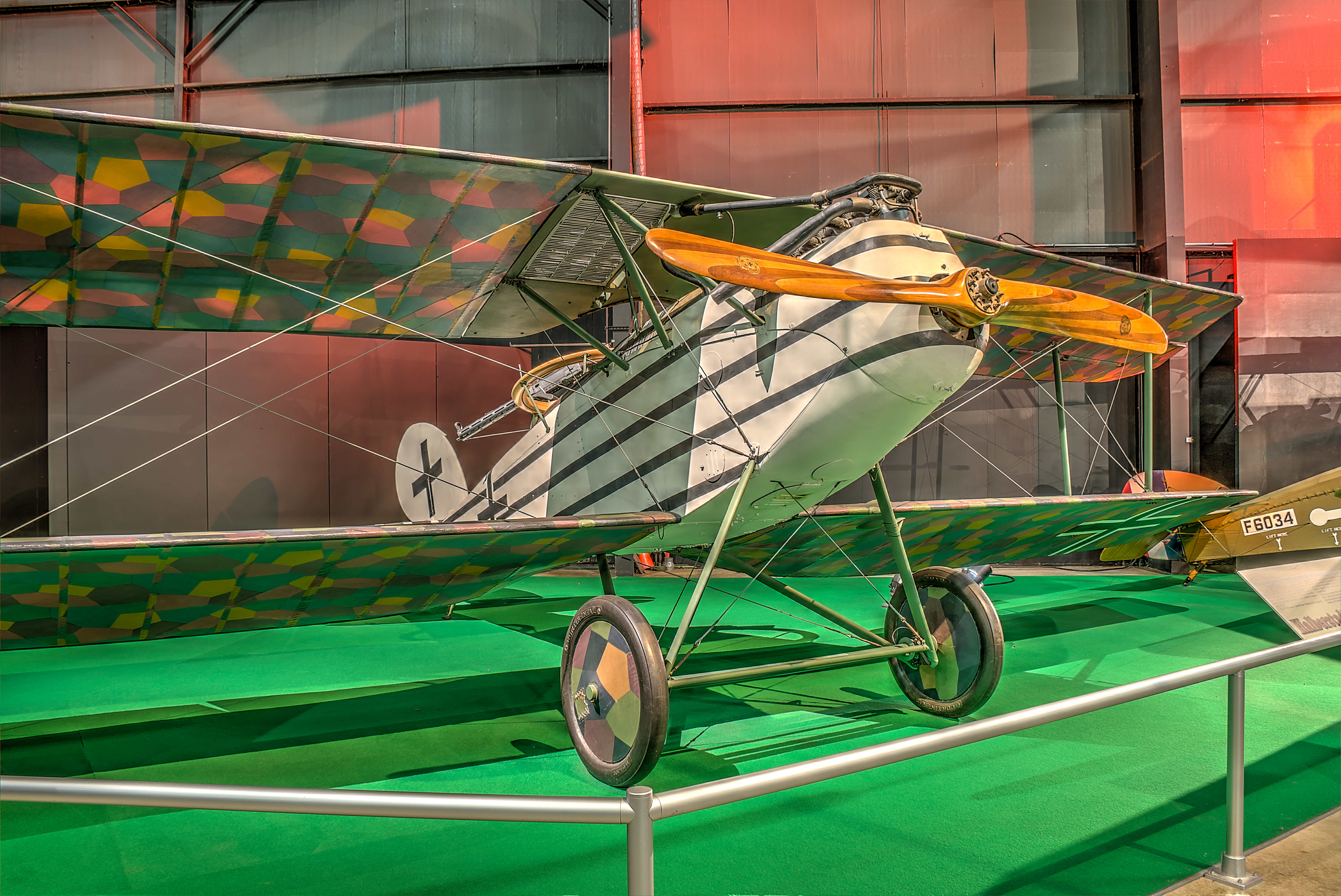
Halberstadt CL.IV at the National Museum of the United States Air Force

Data from German Aircraft of the First World War

General characteristics

- Length: 6.54 m (21 ft 5 in)
- Wingspan: 10.74 m (35 ft 3 in)
- Height: 2.67 m (8 ft 9 in)
- Wing area: 27 m^{2} (290 sq ft)
- Empty weight: 728 kg (1,605 lb)
- Gross weight: 1,068 kg (2,355 lb)
- Powerplant: 1 × Mercedes D.III 6-cylinder water-cooled in-line piston engine, 120 kW (160 hp)
- Propellers: 2-bladed fixed-pitch propeller

Performance

- Maximum speed: 165 km/h (103 mph, 89 kn)
- Endurance: 3 hours 15 minutes
- Time to altitude: 5,000 m (16,000 ft) in 32 minutes

Armament

- Guns:

- 2 × 7.92 mm (.312 in) LMG 08/15 "Spandau" machine gun, synchronized

  - 1 × 7.92 mm (.312 in) Parabellum MG14 machine gun, on ring mount for observer
- Bombs:

- Grenades
- Up to 5 × 10 kg (20 lb) bombs

== Bibliography ==
- Gerdessen, Frederik. "Estonian Air Power 1918 – 1945". Air Enthusiast, No. 18, April – July 1982. pp. 61–76. ISSN 0143-5450.
- Gray, Peter and Thetford, Owen. German Aircraft of the First World War. London: Putnam, 1962.
- Kabatek, Mateusz & Kulczynski, Fr. Robert SDB (2022). German Aircraft in Polish Service: Volume 1: Halberstadt Cl.II, Cl.IV, C.V; LVG C.VI; & Hannover Cl.V. Great War Aviation Centennial Series. Vol. 70. n.p.: Aeronaut Books. ISBN 978-1-953201-58-4.
- Klaauw, Bart van der (March–April 1999). "Unexpected Windfalls: Accidentally or Deliberately, More than 100 Aircraft 'arrived' in Dutch Territory During the Great War". Air Enthusiast (80): 54–59. ISSN 0143-5450.
- Schneider, Richard E. (October 2005). "Au musée de Schorndorf: Le plus ancien avion de ligne allemand". Le Fana de l'Aviation (in French). No. 431. pp. 51–53.
- Stroud, John (1966). European Transport Aircraft since 1910. London: Putnam.
