= List of military aircraft of Germany =

This list of military aircraft of Germany includes prototype, pre-production, and operational types. No distinction is drawn here between different services until 1991.

In 1990, the various air arms of the former German Democratic Republic were absorbed by their counterparts in the Federal Republic of Germany. Some types that had been operated by the GDR were no longer in service by then, and these are so noted.

== Before 1919 ==
- Albatros D.II
- Albatros D.III
- Albatros D.V
- Albatros D.Va
- Daimler L.6
- Fokker D.I
- Fokker D.II
- Fokker D.III
- Fokker D.IV
- Fokker D.V
- Fokker D.VI
- Fokker D.VII
- Fokker D.VIIF
- Fokker D.VIII
- Fokker Dr.I
- Fokker E.I
- Fokker E.III
- Fokker E.IV
- Fokker E.V
- Halberstadt D.I
- Halberstadt D.II
- Halberstadt D.III
- Halberstadt D.V
- Junkers D.I
- Kondor D.VI
- Kondor E.III
- Naglo D.II
- Pfalz D.III
- Pfalz D.IIIa
- Pfalz D.VIII
- Pfalz D.XII
- Pfalz D.XV
- Pfalz Dr.I
- Pfalz E.I
- Pfalz E.II
- Roland D.I
- Roland D.II
- Roland D.III
- Roland D.VI
- Siemens-Schuckert D.I
- Siemens-Schuckert D.II
- Siemens-Schuckert D.III
- Siemens-Schuckert D.IV
- Zeppelin-Lindau D.I

=== Bombers and ground-attack aircraft ===
- AEG DJ.I
- AEG G.I
- AEG G.II
- AEG G.III
- AEG G.IV
- Gotha G.V
- Junkers CL.I
- Zeppelin-Staaken R.VI

=== Patrol and reconnaissance ===
- AEG C.II
- AGO C.I
- AGO C.II
- AGO C.IV
- Albatros B.I
- Albatros B.II
- Albatros C.I
- Albatros C.III
- Albatros C.V
- Albatros C.VII
- Albatros C.IX
- Albatros C.X
- Albatros C.XII
- Aviatik B.I
- Aviatik C.I
- Aviatik C.VI
- DFW B.I
- DFW C.V
- Etrich Taube
- Halberstadt CL.II
- Halberstadt CL.IV (Hannover C.IV ?!)
- Hannover CL.II
- Hannover CL.III
- Hannover CL.IV
- Hannover C.V
- Hansa-Brandenburg W.12
- Hansa-Brandenburg W.19
- Hansa-Brandenburg W.29
- Hansa-Brandenburg W.33
- Junkers J.I
- LVG B.I
- LVG C.II
- Rumpler C.I
- Rumpler C.IV
- Rumpler Taube

=== Trainers ===
- Euler D.I

=== Experimental and research ===
- Fokker V 1
- Fokker V 2
- Fokker V 3 (reference has seven photographs)
- Fokker V 4
- Fokker V 5
- Fokker V 6
- Fokker V 7 and V 7/I, and V 7/II, and V 7/III, and V 7/IV
- Fokker V 9 and V 12, and V 14, and V 16, and V 33
- Fokker V 17 and V 20, and V 21, and V 23, and V 25
- Fokker V 27 and V 37
- Junkers J 1 (pioneering all-metal aircraft)
- Junkers J 7 (single-seat all-metal fighter demonstration prototype)

== 1919–1945 ==
=== Fighters and interceptors ===
- Arado Ar 64, fighter (biplane)
- Arado Ar 65, fighter/trainer (biplane – re-engined Ar 64)
- Arado Ar 67, fighter (biplane) (prototype)
- Arado Ar 68, fighter (biplane)
- Arado Ar 76, fighter (biplane) + trainer
- Arado Ar 80, fighter (prototype)
- Arado Ar 197, naval fighter (biplane – derived from Ar 68)
- Arado Ar 240, heavy fighter + attack, Zerstörer (Destroyer)
- Arado Ar 440, heavy fighter + attack, Zerstörer (Destroyer)
- Blohm & Voss BV 40, Fighter glider, interceptor
- Blohm & Voss BV 155, Day fighter, high-altitude interceptor (formerly Me 155)
- Bachem Ba 349 Natter (Adder or Viper), interceptor (rocket-engine)
- Dornier Do 10, (Do C1) fighter (prototype), 1931
- Dornier Do 29, prototype heavy fighter, Zerstörer
- Dornier Do 335 Pfeil (Arrow), fighter-bomber + night fighter (push-pull engine configuration)
- Dornier Do 435, fighter-bomber
- Dornier Do 635, Long-range reconnaissance
- Fieseler Fi 98, biplane dive bomber, 1936
- Focke-Wulf Fw 57, heavy fighter + bomber (prototype)
- Focke-Wulf Ta 152, interceptor (derived from Fw 190)
- Focke-Wulf Ta 154 Moskito (Mosquito), night-fighter
- Focke-Wulf Fw 159, fighter (prototype only)
- Focke-Wulf Ta 183, jet-engined fighter (prototype)
- Focke-Wulf Fw 187 Falke (Falcon), heavy fighter
- Focke-Wulf Fw 190 Würger (butcher-bird), fighter
- Heinkel He 37, fighter (biplane)
- Heinkel He 38, fighter (biplane)
- Heinkel He 43, fighter (biplane)
- Heinkel He 49, fighter (biplane)
- Heinkel He 51, fighter + close-support (biplane)
- Heinkel He 100, fighter
- Heinkel He 112, fighter
- Heinkel He 113, fighter (alternative propaganda designation for He 100)
- Heinkel He 162 Volksjäger (People's Fighter), fighter (jet-engined)
- Heinkel He 219 Uhu (Eagle-Owl), night-fighter
- Heinkel He 280, fighter (jet-engined)
- Henschel Hs 121, fighter + trainer (prototype)
- Henschel Hs 124, heavy fighter + bomber (prototype)
- Henschel Hs 125, fighter + trainer (prototype)
- Horten Ho 229, fighter-bomber (jet-powered flying-wing)
- Junkers Ju 248, re-designation of Me 263
- Messerschmitt Bf 109, fighter + night-fighter (often mis-designated as the "Me 109")
- Messerschmitt Bf 110, heavy fighter + night fighter + fighter-bomber + ground-attack
- Messerschmitt Me 163 Komet (Comet), interceptor (rocket-engined)
- Messerschmitt Me 209, fighter + speed-record aircraft (prototype)
- Messerschmitt Me 209-II, fighter (prototype – completely different from Me 209)
- Messerschmitt Me 210, heavy fighter + reconnaissance + ground-attack + fighter-bomber + dive bomber
- Messerschmitt Me 262 Schwalbe (Swallow), fighter + attack (jet-engined)
- Messerschmitt Me 263, interceptor (rocket-engined)
- Messerschmitt Me 265, heavy fighter prototype
- Messerschmitt Me 309, fighter (prototype)
- Messerschmitt Me 328, pulsejet fighter/attack aircraft (prototype)
- Messerschmitt Me 329, heavy fighter prototype
- Messerschmitt Me 410 Hornisse (Hornet), heavy fighter + reconnaissance + fighter-bomber + night-fighter
- Messerschmitt Me 609 heavy fighter + bomber (project)

=== Bombers and ground-attack aircraft ===
- Arado Ar 66, trainer + night ground attack
- Arado Ar 234 Blitz ('Lightning'), bomber + night-fighter (jet-engined)
- Blohm & Voss Ha 140, torpedo bomber floatplane (prototype)
- Blohm & Voss BV 237, dive bomber, ground attack (project)
- Dornier Do 11, (Do F) medium bomber, 1931
- Dornier Do 13, medium bomber, 1933
- Dornier Do 17 Fliegender Bleistift (Flying Pencil), bomber + recon + night-fighter
- Dornier Do 18, bomber + reconnaissance flying-boat, 1935
- Dornier Do 19, quad-engined heavy bomber (prototype)
- Dornier Do 22, torpedo bomber + reconnaissance seaplane
- Dornier Do 23, bomber
- Dornier Do 215, bomber + night-fighter
- Dornier Do 217, bomber + night-fighter
- Dornier Do 317
- Fieseler Fi 167, ship-borne torpedo bomber + reconnaissance (biplane)
- Focke-Wulf Fw 42, prototype bomber
- Focke-Wulf Fw 189 Uhu (Eagle Owl), reconnaissance
- Focke-Wulf Fw 191, heavy bomber prototype
- Focke-Wulf Fw 200 Condor, heavy bomber
- Focke-Wulf Ta 400, long-range bomber
- Heinkel He 45, bomber + trainer
- Heinkel He 50, reconnaissance + dive bomber (biplane)
- Heinkel He 111, bomber
- Heinkel He 177 Greif (Griffon), long-range bomber
- Heinkel He 274, high-altitude bomber, two prototypes completed post-war in France
- Heinkel He 277, never-built trans-oceanic range bomber, evolved into Amerika Bomber competitor
- Heinkel He 343, jet bomber/reconnaissance, design only
- Henschel Hs 123, ground-attack (biplane)
- Henschel Hs 127, bomber (prototype)
- Henschel Hs 129, ground-attack
- Henschel Hs 130, high altitude reconnaissance + bomber (prototype)
- Henschel Hs 132, dive bomber (jet-engined) (prototype)
- Hütter Hü 136, dive-bomber (prototype)
- Junkers Ju 86, bomber + extreme high-altitude reconnaissance
- Junkers Ju 87 Stuka, dive-bomber + ground-attack
- Junkers Ju 88, bomber + reconnaissance + night-fighter
- Junkers Ju 89, heavy bomber (prototype)
- Junkers Ju 90, bomber (prototype)
- Junkers Ju 187, dive bomber (prototype)
- Junkers Ju 188, Rächer (Avenger), bomber + recon
- Junkers Ju 287, heavy bomber (jet-engined) (prototype)
- Junkers Ju 288, bomber (prototype)
- Junkers Ju 290, long-range bomber + recon
- Junkers Ju 388, bomber (prototype)
- Junkers Ju 390, long-range bomber (prototype), Amerika Bomber competitor
- Junkers Ju 488, heavy bomber project
- Junkers EF 132, heavy bomber project
- Messerschmitt Bf 162, bomber (prototype)
- Messerschmitt Me 264, long-range bomber (prototype), first-built and flown Amerika Bomber competitor

=== Patrol and reconnaissance ===
- Arado Ar 95, coastal patrol + attack (biplane seaplane)
- Arado Ar 196, ship-borne reconnaissance + coastal patrol (seaplane)
- Arado Ar 198, reconnaissance
- Arado Ar 231, fold-wing U-boat reconnaissance aircraft (prototype)
- Blohm & Voss BV 138 Fliegende Holzschuh, flying-boat (early versions designated as Ha 138)
- Blohm & Voss BV 141, reconnaissance (asymmetric)
- Blohm & Voss BV 142, reconnaissance + transport
- Blohm & Voss BV 222 long-range flying boat
- Blohm & Voss BV 238, flying-boat (prototype)
- DFS 228, rocket-powered reconnaissance aircraft (prototype only)
- Dornier Do 16, previously Do J, better known as Wal (Whale), reconnaissance flying-boat
- Dornier Do 18 reconnaissance flying-boat
- Fieseler Fi 156 Storch (Stork), STOL reconnaissance aircraft
- Focke-Wulf Fw 62, ship-borne reconnaissance (biplane seaplane)
- Focke-Wulf Fw 200 Condor, transport + maritime patrol-bomber
- Focke-Wulf Fw 300 proposed long-range version of Fw 200
- Gotha Go 147, STOL reconnaissance (prototype)
- Heinkel He 46, reconnaissance
- Heinkel He 59, reconnaissance (biplane seaplane)
- Heinkel He 60, ship-borne reconnaissance (biplane seaplane)
- Heinkel He 114, reconnaissance seaplane
- Heinkel He 116, transport + reconnaissance
- Henschel Hs 126, reconnaissance
- Hütter Hü 211, reconnaissance and night fighter
- Junkers Ju 388 Störtebeker, reconnaissance + night-fighter
- Messerschmitt Bf 163 STOL reconnaissance aircraft (prototypes only)
- Messerschmitt Me 261, long-range reconnaissance
- Messerschmitt Me 321 Gigant, heavy transport glider
- Messerschmitt Me 323 Gigant, powered version of Me 321
- Siebel Si 201, STOL reconnaissance aircraft (prototype)

=== Transport and utility ===
- Arado Ar 232 Tausendfüssler, transport
- Blohm & Voss Ha 139, long-range seaplane
- Blohm & Voss BV 144, transport
- Blohm & Voss BV 222 Wiking (Viking), transport flying-boat
- DFS 230, transport glider
- DFS 331, transport glider (prototype)
- Dornier Do 12, Libelle seaplane
- Dornier Do 14, seaplane (prototype)
- Dornier Do 26, transport flying-boat
- Dornier Do 214, transport flying-boat (prototype)
- Gotha Go 146, small transport (twin-engine), 1935
- Gotha Go 242, transport glider
- Gotha Go 244, transport
- Gotha Go 345, assault glider
- Gotha Ka 430, transport glider
- Heinkel He 70, "Blitz" (Lightning), single-engine transport + mailplane, 1932
- Heinkel He 115, general-purpose seaplane
- Junkers Ju 52 Tante Ju (Auntie Ju), transport + bomber
- Junkers Ju 252, transport
- Junkers Ju 322, transport glider
- Junkers Ju 352 Herkules (Hercules), transport
- Junkers W34, transport
- Klemm Kl 31, single-engine transport, 1931
- Klemm Kl 32, single-engine transport, 1931
- Klemm Kl 36, single-engine transport, 1934
- Messerschmitt Me 321 Gigant (Giant), transport glider
- Messerschmitt Me 323, transport. Motorised version of Me 321
- Siebel Fh 104 Hallore, medium transport
- Siebel Si 204, transport + aircrew trainer

=== Trainers ===
- Albatros Al 101
- Albatros Al 102
- Albatros Al 103
- Arado Ar 69, trainer (biplane) (prototypes), 1933
- Arado Ar 96, trainer
- Arado Ar 199, seaplane trainer
- Arado Ar 396, trainer
- Bücker Bü 131 Jungmann (Young Man), trainer (biplane)
- Bücker Bü 133 Jungmeister (Young Champion), trainer + aerobatics (biplane)
- Bücker Bü 180 Student (Student), trainer
- Bücker Bü 181 Bestmann (Bestman), trainer + transport
- Bücker Bü 182 Kornett (Ensign), trainer
- Fieseler Fi 5 (F-5) acrobatic sportsplane + trainer, 1933
- Focke-Wulf Fw 44 Stieglitz (Goldfinch), trainer (biplane)
- Focke-Wulf Fw 56 Stösser (Falcon Hawk), trainer (parasol monoplane)
- Focke-Wulf Fw 58 Weihe (Kite), transport + trainer
- Gotha Go 145, trainer
- Heinkel He 72 Kadett (Cadet), trainer
- Heinkel He 74, fighter + advanced trainer (prototype)
- Heinkel He 172, trainer (prototype)
- Klemm Kl 35, sportplane + trainer, 1935
- Messerschmitt Bf 108 Taifun (Typhoon), trainer + transport
- Siebel Si 202 "Hummel" sportplane + trainer, 1938

=== Helicopters ===
- Flettner Fl 184 prototype reconnaissance helicopter
- Flettner Fl 185 prototype reconnaissance helicopter
- Flettner Fl 265 prototype reconnaissance helicopter
- Flettner Fl 282 Kolibri (Hummingbird), reconnaissance helicopter
- Flettner Fl 339 prototype reconnaissance helicopter
- Focke Achgelis Fa 223 Drache (Dragon), transport helicopter (prototype)
- Focke Achgelis Fa 266 Hornisse (Hornet), helicopter (prototype)
- Focke Achgelis Fa 330, unpowered "gyrokite" (prototype)
- Focke Achgelis Fa 336 scout helicopter (prototype), 1944
- Focke-Wulf Fw 61, helicopter (prototype)
- Focke-Wulf Fw 186, autogiro reconnaissance aircraft (prototype)

=== Experimental and research ===
- DFS 39, Lippisch-designed tail-less research aircraft
- DFS 40, Lippisch-designed tail-less research aircraft
- DFS 194, rocket-powered research aircraft, forerunner of Me 163
- DFS 228, rocket-powered high altitude long range reconnaissance prototype
- DFS 332
- DFS 346, supersonic research aircraft (incomplete prototype only)
- Göppingen Gö 9 development aircraft for Do 335 Pfeil
- Heinkel He 176, pioneering liquid-fueled rocket-engined experimental aircraft (prototype)
- Heinkel He 178, pioneering jet-engined experimental aircraft
- Heinkel Lerche, VTOL experiment
- Horten Ho 229, jet-engined flying wing light bomber
- Lippisch P.13a, delta-winged ramjet powered fighter.
- Messerschmitt Me P.1101, variable-geometry jet fighter.

== 1946–1991 ==
=== Fighters and interceptors ===
==== West Germany ====
- Hawker Sea Hawk
- Lockheed F-104F, G, TF-104G Starfighter
- McDonnell-Douglas F-4F, F, RF-4E Phantom II
- North American/Canadair CL-13 Sabre 5, 6, F-86K
- Republic F-84 Thunderstreak, RF-84F Thunderflash

==== East Germany ====
- Mikoyan-Gurevich MiG-15bis, UTI (DDR only)
- Mikoyan-Gurevich MiG-17F, PF (DDR only)
- Mikoyan-Gurevich MiG-19PF, PFM, PM, S, SF (DDR only)
- Mikoyan-Gurevich MiG-21F, F-13, FL, M, MF, PF, PFM, PFS, RF, SPS, SPSK, bis, UM, US, USM, UTI
- Mikoyan-Gurevich MiG-23BN, MF, ML, PFM, S, UB
- Mikoyan MiG-29, −29UBC
- Sukhoi Su-20
- Sukhoi Su-22, −22UM

=== Bombers and ground-attack aircraft ===
==== West Germany ====
- Panavia Tornado IDS
- Dornier Alpha Jet A
- Fiat G-91

==== East Germany ====
- Ilyushin Il-28, −28U (DDR only)
- Sukhoi Su-22M4s,-48U (DDR only)

=== Patrol and reconnaissance ===
==== West Germany ====
- Breguet Atlantic I
- English Electric Canberra B.2 Used in ground mapping and Recon role
- Fairey Gannet A.S.4, T.5
- Grob Egrett II
- Grumman OV-1 Mohawk Evaluated only
- Lockheed RF-104G Starfighter

=== Transport and utility ===
==== West Germany ====
- Airbus A310
- Boeing 707
- Canadair Challenger
- Convair C-131 Samaritan
- de Havilland Heron 2D
- Dornier Do DS-10
- Dornier Do 27A, B
- Dornier Do 28A-1, D "Skyservant"
- Dornier 228-201
- Dornier Do 29
- Dornier Do 32E
- Dornier Do 34
- Douglas A-26 Invader only used for target towing
- Douglas C-47 Skytrain
- Douglas DC-6B
- Grumman HU-16 Albatross
- HFB 320 Hansa Jet
- Learjet 35A, 36A
- LET L-410
- Lockheed C-140 Jetstar
- Nord Noratlas
- North American OV-10B
- Percival Pembroke C54
- Pützer Elster B
- Transall C-160D
- VFW 614

==== East Germany ====
- Antonov An-2, −2S, −2T, −2TD (DDR only)
- Antonov An-12
- Antonov An-14 (DDR only)
- Antonov An-26
- Ilyushin Il-14 (DDR only)
- Ilyushin Il-18 (DDR only)
- Ilyushin Il-62
- LET Brigadyr (DDR only)
- Polikarpov Po-2 (DDR only)
- Tupolev Tu-124 (DDR only)
- Tupolev Tu-134
- Tupolev Tu-154M
- Yakovlev Yak-40 (DDR only)

=== Trainers ===
==== West Germany ====
- Cessna T-37B
- Dassault Breguet Dornier Alpha Jet 1A
- Fiat G.91 R-3, R-4, T-1
- Fouga CM.170 Magister, Potez-Heinkel CM-191
- Lockheed T-33A
- MBB Fan Ranger 2000
- North American T-6 Texan
- Northrop T-38A Talon
- Piaggio P.149D
- Pilatus PC-9
- Piper Super Cub h
- RFB Fantrainer
- Siat Flamingo

==== East Germany ====
- Aero Albatros
- Aero L-29 Delfín (DDR only)
- Aero Super Aero 45S (DDR only)
- Yakovlev Yak-11 (DDR only)
- Yakovlev Yak-18 (DDR only)
- Zlin Z43 (DDR only)

=== Helicopters ===
==== West Germany ====
- Aérospatiale Alouette II
- Aérospatiale Dauphin N4
- Aérospatiale Djinn
- Aérospatiale SA 330 Puma
- Aérospatiale Super Puma
- Aérospatiale Cougar
- Bell 47G-2
- UH-1D Iroquois/Bell 205/212
- Bölkow Bö 46
- Bristol Sycamore
- Hiller UH-12C
- MBB Bo 102
- MBB Bo 103
- MBB Bo 105A, BSH-1, C, M, VBH, P, PAH-1
- MBB Bo 106
- MBB Bo 115
- MBB/Kawasaki BK 117A-3M
- Merckle SM 67
- Saro Skeeters Mk. 50, Mk.51
- Sikorsky CH-34A, C, G
- Westland Sea King HAS.41
- Sikorsky Skycrane
- Sikorsky CH-53 Sea Stallion
- Vertol H-21 Shawnee
- Wallis Venom
- Westland Lynx HAS 88

==== East Germany ====
- Kamov Ka-29
- Mil Mi-1 (DDR only)
- Mil Mi-2
- Mil Mi-4 (DDR only)
- Mil Mi-8, TB, S, Mi-9, Mi-17
- Mil Mi-14BT, PL
- Mil Mi-24

=== Experimental and research ===
- Dornier Do 31
- EWR VJ 101C
- VFW VAK 191B
- Hawker Kestrel F.(GA)1
- RFB X-114
- MBB Lampyridae

=== Other aircraft ===
- Gloster Meteor TT.20
- Hawker Sea Fury TT.20
- Panavia Tornado ECR

== 1991 onwards ==
The reunified Germany's military aircraft consisted of a mix of East and West German Aircraft that were in service along with new aircraft acquired after combining. In 2004 the last remnants of the communist East German armed forces NVA were given to neighbouring countries of Germany, such as Poland.

=== Fighters and interceptors ===
- Eurofighter Typhoon
- McDonnell-Douglas F-4F Phantom II
- MiG-29G (sold to Poland in 2004)

=== Fighter bombers ===
==== Air Force ====
- Panavia Tornado IDS
- Panavia Tornado ECR

==== Navy ====
- Panavia Tornado IDS (transferred to air force in 2005)

=== Patrol and reconnaissance ===
==== Luftwaffe ====
- Panavia Tornado RECCE version with reconnaissance pod

==== Navy ====
- Breguet Atlantic, out of service
- P-3C Orion (with the most modern upgrades worldwide)
- Boeing P-8A Poseidon

=== UAVs ===
==== Air Force ====
- EuroHawk (out of service)
- IAI Heron (on order)

==== Army ====
- Bombardier/Dornier CL 289
- EMT Aladin
- EMT Luna
- EMT Mikado
- Rheinmetall KZO

=== Transport and utility ===
==== Air Force ====
- Airbus A310 MRTT + VIP, out of service
- Airbus A319
- Airbus A321
- Airbus A340-300 Two former Lufthansa, service entry 2009.
- Airbus ACJ350 XWB, service entry 1 x 2020, 2 x 2022
- Airbus Military A400M
- Bombardier Global Express Ordered, replaced Challengers.
- Transall C-160D, out of service
- Ilyushin Il-62 Former Interflug, out of service.
- Tupolev Tu-134 Former Interflug, out of service.
- Tupolev Tu-154M Former NVA, out of service. One out of two modified for Open Skies.
- Let L-410 Turbolet Former NVA, out of service.

==== Navy ====
- Dornier 228-201

=== Trainers ===
- Cessna T-37B Tweet
- Northrop T-38A Talon
- Grob G 120
- Grob G 120TP

=== Helicopters ===
==== Army ====
- NHIndustries NH90
- Eurocopter Tiger
- Eurocopter EC-135 (Trainer)
- Bell UH-1D, out of service
- Eurocopter (MBB) BO-105P/M, out of service

==== Navy ====
- Westland Sea King
- Westland Lynx
- NHIndustries NH90 Sea Lion

==== Airforce ====
- Bell UH-1D, out of service
- Eurocopter Cougar AS532
- Sikorsky CH-53G/GS (extensive upgrades planned)
- Airbus Helicopters H145M

=== Experimental and research ===
- EADS Barracuda

== See also ==
- List of RLM aircraft designations
- List of aircraft of the WW2 Luftwaffe
- List of military aircraft of Japan

== Bibliography ==
- Silvester, John. "Call to Arms: The Percival Sea Prince and Pembroke". Air Enthusiast, No. 55, Autumn 1994, pp. 56–61. ISSN 0143-5450
