= Berum =

Berum may refer to:

- Berum, Hage, a village in the German municipality of Hage near Berumbur
- Berum Castle, a castle in that village
- Treaty of Berum, a treaty signed at that castle.
