= Berumbur =

- Municipality
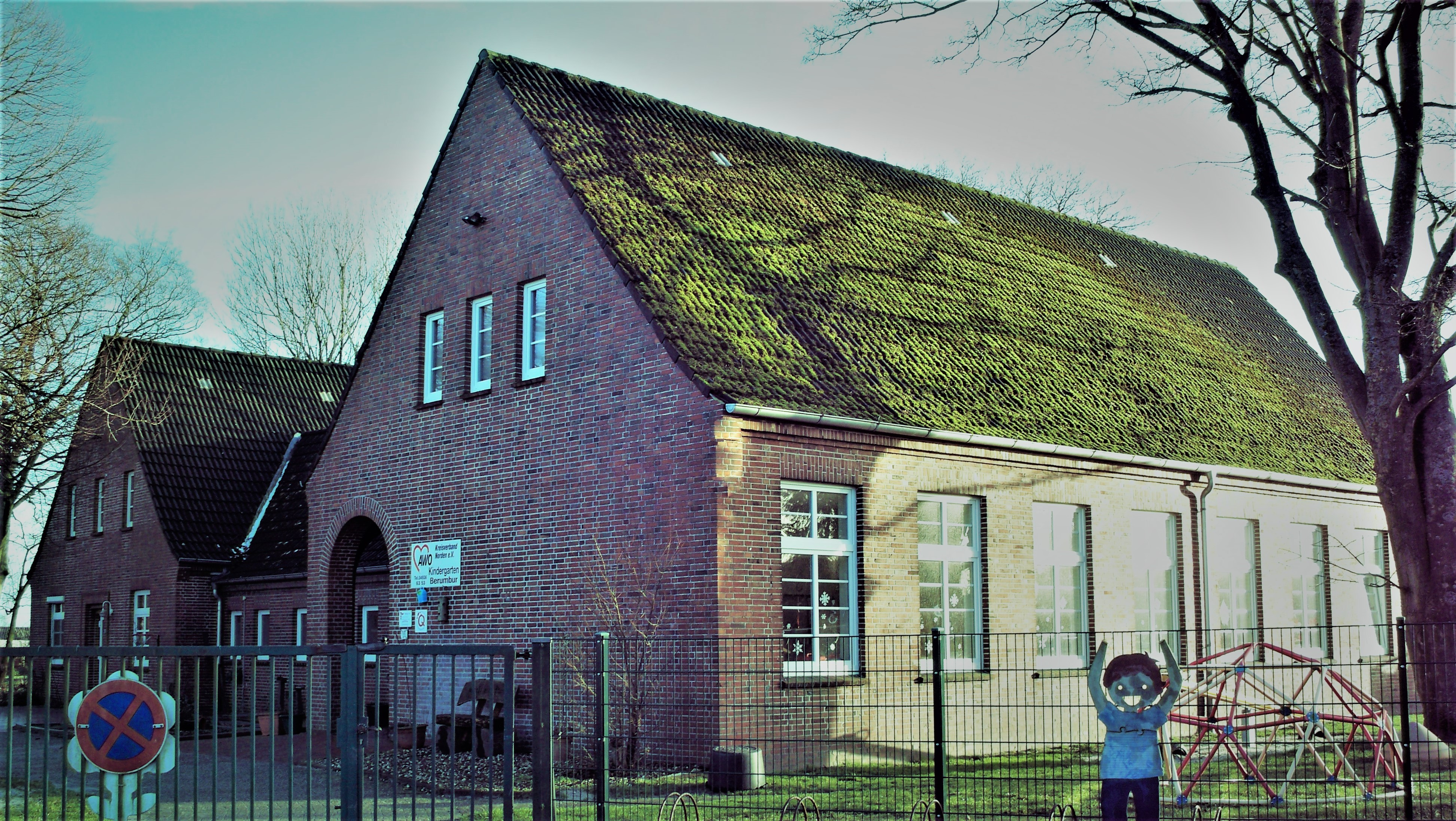
- Kindergarten in Kleinheide, Berumbur

- Flag Coat of arms

- Location of Berumbur within Aurich district
- Interactive map of Berumbur
- Location within Germany Location within Lower Saxony
- Coordinates: 53°36′00″N 07°19′00″E
- Country: Germany
- State: Lower Saxony
- District: Aurich
- Municipal assoc.: Hage
- Subdivisions: 4 Ortsteile

Government
  - Mayor: Udo Schmidt (SPD)

Area
  - Total: 6.42 km^{2} (2.48 sq mi)
- Elevation: 2 m (6.6 ft)

Population (2025-12-31)
  - Total: 2,695
  - Density: 420/km^{2} (1,090/sq mi)
- Time zone: UTC+01:00 (CET)
  - Summer (DST): UTC+02:00 (CEST)
- Postal codes: 26524
- Dialling codes: 0 49 36
- Vehicle registration: AUR, NOR

Berumbur is a municipality in the district of Aurich, in Lower Saxony, Germany. It is part of the municipal association (Samtgemeinde) of Hage. In 2022 it had approximately 2,700 inhabitants and covers an area of 6.42 square kilometers. It is east of the town of Hage.

The municipality includes the districts (Ortsteile) Kleinheide and Holzdorf. Directly to the west of Berumbur is Berum, home to Berum Castle, which played a prominent role in East Frisian history.

== Etymology ==
The place was first officially mentioned as Bherum Buer in 1552. Later names were Behrumsbuhr (1645) and Berumbuer (1730). In the name of this settlement, the Proto-Germanic root *būr- appears twice: in the defining word as an umlauted Old Frisian form bēre, in the base word as Middle Low German būr. The meaning is "farming community belonging to Berum".
