= Gotha WD.11 =

German World War I torpedo bomber seaplane

WD.11
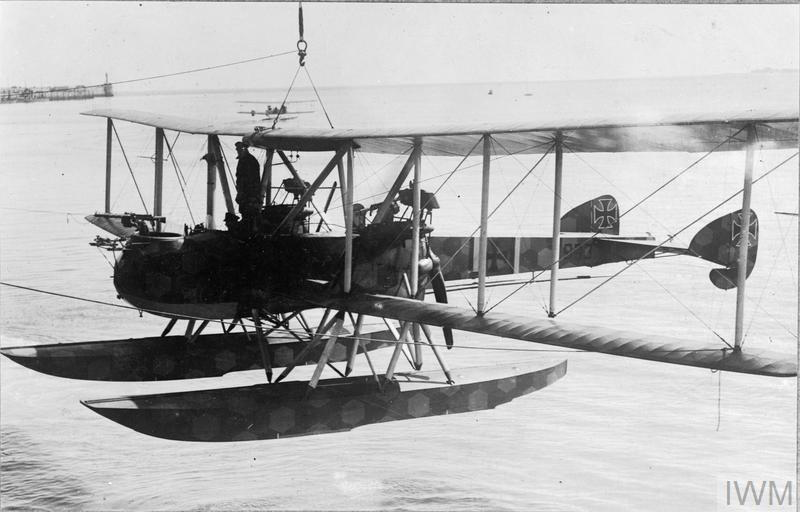
- A WD.11 being lowered onto the water

General information
- Type: Torpedo-bomber floatplane
- National origin: Germany
- Manufacturer: Gothaer Waggonfabrik
- Primary user: Imperial German Navy
- Number built: 17

History
- First flight: 1916
- Retired: 1918

The Gotha WD.11 (Wasser Doppeldecker - "Water Biplane") was a three-seat floatplane torpedo-bomber developed during World War I by Gothaer Waggonfabrik (Gotha) for the Imperial German Navy's (Kaiserliche Marine) Naval Air Service (Marine-Fliegerabteilung). The company's earlier Gotha WD.7 had been moderately successful as a training aircraft for torpedo tactics and it designed a larger and more powerful aircraft along the same general lines. The prototype was completed in 1916 and the aircraft entered service the following year. 17 examples were built and enjoyed limited success, sinking two British freighters in the North Sea. One squadron participated in Operation Albion in 1917 with limited effectiveness. Torpedo shortages and durability issues forced the WD.11s removal from active service in 1918. Fewer than half survived to be inventoried by the Allies after the war.

== Background and description ==
After the submarine SM U-9 sank three British armored cruisers on 22 September 1914 shortly after the war began, the German Imperial Naval Office (Reichsmarine-Amt) decided to try mounting torpedoes on aircraft as they were far easier and faster to build than submarines. Gotha's initial submission to meet this requirement, the WD.7, was built to train torpedo delivery tactics and was evaluated as not suitable for combat duties. A prototype of the WD.11 was ordered on 9 March 1916 and it was turned over to the Seaplane Experimental Command (Seeflugzeug-Versuchs-Kommando) on 9 October. The first batch of five production aircraft were ordered during that month and were delivered in April–May 1917. Two subsequent batches totaling eleven aircraft were ordered in January 1917 and delivered from June through September.

Like its predecessor, the WD.11 was a conventional sesquiplane with twin floats below the wings, although the two 160-metric-horsepower (120 kW) Mercedes D.III engines were mounted tractor-fashion on the lower wing with the box radiators positioned above the engines. The aircraft had separate cockpits for two observers and a pilot position behind the forward observer. Each of the two floats were attached to the fuselage and wings by 10 struts. The twin-tail empennage had the two vertical stabilizers located at the ends of the horizontal stabilizer and was supported by struts. The wings were connected with six sets of interplane struts that gave the aircraft a three-bay configuration. In service the German pilots found the WD.11's structure too weak for the heavy weights that it needed to carry, specially while taking off or landing.

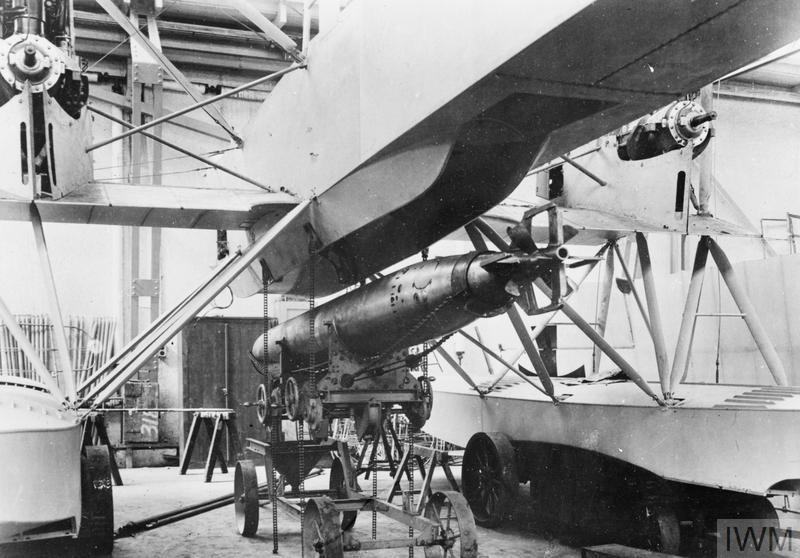
A G/125 torpedo being loaded

The observer in the forward cockpit was provided with a 7.92-millimeter (0.312 in) Parabellum MG14 machinegun and some aircraft were modified with an additional gun for the rear observer. The 45-centimeter (17.7 in) Whitehead G/125 torpedo was carried semi-recessed in a trough mounted on the aircraft's fuselage between the floats at a nose-down angle of 5 degrees. If a torpedo was carried the WD.11 lacked the rear observer. Some aircraft were modified to carry ten 58-kilogram (128 lb) bombs or a larger number of smaller bombs in the torpedo trough. The TeKa naval mine was developed in 1917 to fit in the torpedo trough.

The torpedoes used by the WD.11 and other German torpedo bombers were not designed for aerial use and had very narrow parameters for a successful launch, namely that the aircraft had to be flying straight and level and at an altitude of no more than 10 meters (33 ft). To give pilots a method by which all of these conditions could be judged, some of the WD.11s were fitted with an Anschütz gyroscopic inclinometer to assess their flight attitude. Their height above water was measured by a 10-meter weighed steel cable that triggered a light or bells in the cockpit when it touched the water, completing an electrical circuit.

== Operational history ==
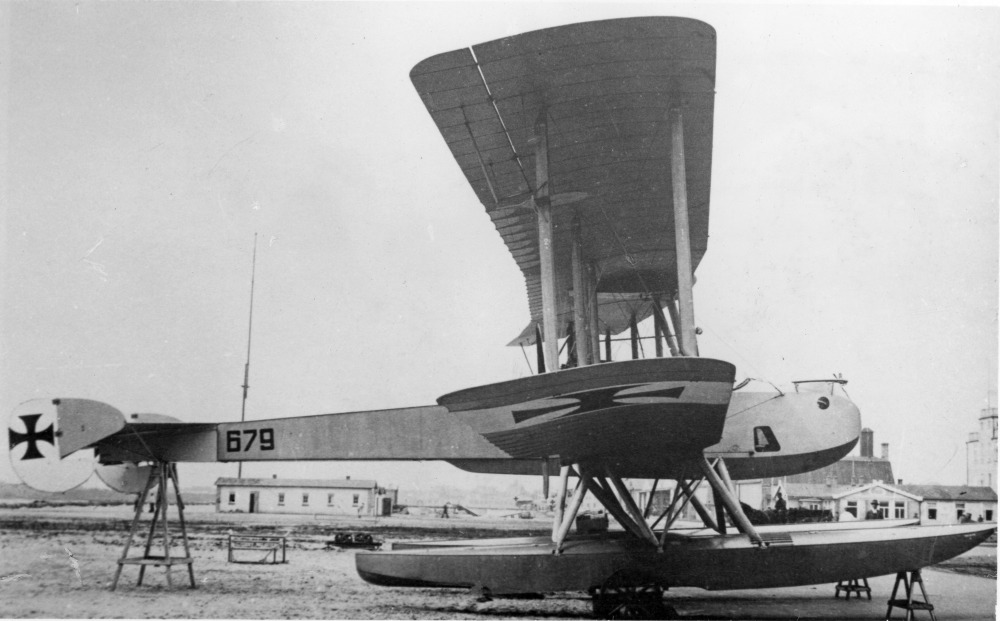
A profile view of the prototype, c. 1916

The prototype crashed on 31 October 1916 when one of its floats broke up when landing. It was not badly damaged and returned to service as a training aircraft.

The first WD.11s to see combat were assigned to the 2nd Front Squadron (II. Front-Staffel), Naval Air Station Flanders I (Seeflugstation Flandern I) at Zeebrugge in Occupied Belgium in early May 1917. On 20 May one aircraft made an unsuccessful attempt to torpedo a British cargo ship. Three WD.11s attempted to bomb the port of Dunkirk, France, on the night of 31 May/1 June, but were unable to locate their target in the darkness. They continued onwards to their secondary target of Calais, where they were engaged by anti-aircraft guns because of their low altitudes. One aircraft had a shell pass through a wing and it was struck by eight shell fragments. The mission was ineffective because the bomb release mechanism jammed on two of the aircraft. Two nights later, the three WD.11s bombed the military airfield at Saint-Pol-sur-Mer with some effect. A torpedo mission against targets in the Thames estuary on the evening of 3/4 June had to be aborted when two of the three WD.11s had to turn back with mechanical problems. This was to be a continuing problem as the Naval Air Service found them to be underpowered and fragile in service given the heavy loads that they were intended to carry.

After passing the lightvessel at Outer Gabbard on the morning of 15 June, the formation of three WD.11s and two Friedrichshafen FF.33 floatplanes spotted the British 3,718-gross register ton (GRT) freighter SS Kankakee. The ship was able to evade the first two torpedoes, but the third one struck it amidships and sank it; three crewmen were killed during the attack. On the afternoon of 9 July a pair of WD.11s surprised two cargo ships approaching the Thames estuary, but both torpedoes started jumping through the waves and missed. Another pair of WD.11s attempted to torpedo two other ships later that day, but both torpedoes malfunctioned and British anti-aircraft fire caused one of the aircraft to make an emergency landing when one of its engines was disabled. The other bomber landed nearby and the crew of the first one was able to swim over to be picked up. As the second WD.11 attempted to takeoff, one of its floats was ripped off by a wave and it crashed. All four crewmen survived to be rescued by a British ship. Reinforced by aircraft taken from the 1st Front Squadron, three WD.11s laid TeKa mines in the Thames Estuary on 24 July. Five aircraft attempted to repeat the mission near Kentish Knock Shoal on 8 August, but mechanical failures aboard two of the bombers caused the flight to be aborted before they could lay their mines. Four days later three WD.11s bombed British ships defending the Dover Barrage off the coast of Flanders, claiming one hit on a destroyer. Bad weather prevented the aircraft from flying any missions until 4 September when four WD.11s bombed Dunkirk; one aircraft had to turn back before it reached the target while another had an engine fail on the return trip. The pilot made an emergency landing on the beach at Nieuwpoort, Belgium, and the crew was able to set fire to the bomber and evade the local Belgian garrison before reaching nearby German-held territory.

The 1st Front Squadron briefly relieved the 2nd Front Squadron at Zeebrugge on 7 September. Two days later, a flight of three WD.11s detected a small convoy and torpedoed a 440-GRT freighter, SS Storm, which sank with the loss of three crewmen. Another group of three aircraft searched for ships off the Dutch coast on 11 September. Unable to find anything, they turned back. One WD.11 ran out of fuel north of IJmuiden and was forced to make an emergency landing. Another WD.11 was able to deliver fuel to the first one, but only one engine could be restarted and the aircraft was forced to taxi all the way back to Zeebrugge. The following day the 1st Squadron was ordered to transfer to the base at Windau in Courland (modern Ventspils, Latvia) to support the German invasion of the West Estonian Archipelago (Operation Albion) and the 2nd Squadron's planned withdrawal to refit in Flensburg, Germany, was cancelled. The unit resumed anti-shipping and minelaying missions on 16 September, but the poor condition of the WD.11s hindered their effectiveness. For example three of the five aircraft attempting to lay mines on 24 September were forced to return to base with mechanical issues. The following day a WD.11 was forced to make an emergency landing in fog off the Dutch coast and a two-aircraft rescue mission was launched to find the torpedo bomber. They found it being towed by a Dutch coast guard ship as it had drifted into Dutch territorial waters, but they landed regardless and unsuccessfully attempted to rescue the crew as the ship drove off both with machinegun fire. After the death of its commander when his Friedrichshafen FF.39 caught fire and crashed on 1 October, the 2nd Squadron was taken off operations for a lack of crews and serviceable aircraft, although it was not transferred to Flensburg until 16 November.

=== Operation Albion and afterwards ===
The 1st Front Squadron became operational on 1 October with the mission of attacking ships of the Imperial Russian Navy's Baltic Fleet and received 10 G/125 torpedoes. The unit was ordered into action on 4 October when two small minelayers were spotted off the coast of the Sõrve Peninsula on Ösel Island (modern Saaremaa). Five WD.11s and four other bombers attacked the ships and the nearby coast-defense guns, dropping 3,500 kilograms (7,700 lb) of bombs. No effects on the targets was noted. The same five WD.11s attacked the ships on 8 October without result. Two of the torpedoes missed while the others struck the sea bottom or otherwise failed to operate properly in the shallow water. When Operation Albion began on 12 October, German troops landed on Ösel, capturing the Russian seaplane base at Arensburg (modern Kuressaare) the following day. The 1st Squadron began staging through the base on 15 October. One aircraft broke a float on takeoff that day and had to remain in Arensburg; one of the two other aircraft bombed a coast-defense battery while the other one claimed a hit on the battleship Slava. Russian sources state the attack missed and that ship attacked was actually the battleship Grazhdanin. The squadron continued to attack Russian targets for the next several days without much success and one aircraft was forced to make an emergency landing when one of its engines was disabled by a bullet. An attempt to repair the disabled aircraft at Arensburg on 21 October was only partially successful as one aircraft crashed on takeoff and another had to be abandoned. The squadron was ordered to return to Zeebrugge two days later and all of the unserviceable aircraft were left behind.

The unit arrived on 12 November and was equipped with a pair of new Gotha WD.14 bombers in addition to the three WD.11s that it had brought back from the Baltic. The weather was generally not suitable for the WD.11s during this time and they only flew a pair of unsuccessful anti-shipping missions in December before the squadron commander decided to replace them with more capable WD.14s. The torpedo bombers had generally been ineffective in their torpedo attacks and the Imperial Naval Office decided to stop deliveries of scarce torpedoes from 15 January 1918. The torpedo bomber units were disbanded on 20 April and their aircraft and personnel were transferred to other units on the North Sea coast. When the Allies inspected the German seaplane bases in December 1918, they recorded seven surviving WD.11s at Hage. Their ultimate fate is unknown, but they were likely scrapped.

=== Foreign service ===
A WD.11 was interned by the Dutch on 24 September 1916 after it had been forced to make an emergency landing off the coast of the Netherlands; the aircraft received the serial number M-1 when the Netherlands Naval Aviation Service was formed in 1917.

== Operators ==
German Empire

- Kaiserliche Marine

Netherlands

- Royal Netherlands Navy

== Specifications (WD.11) ==
Data from Gotha Aircraft of WWI: A Centennial Perspective on Great War Airplanes; German Aircraft of the First World War

General characteristics

- Crew: 3
- Length: 13.45 m (44 ft 2 in)
- Upper wingspan: 22.5 m (73 ft 10 in)
- Lower wingspan: 21 m (68 ft 11 in)
- Height: 4.75 m (15 ft 7 in)
- Wing area: 104 m^{2} (1,120 sq ft)
- Empty weight: 2,146 kg (4,731 lb)
- Gross weight: 3,583 kg (7,899 lb)
- Powerplant: 2 × Mercedes D.III water-cooled, straight-six engines, 120 kW (160 hp) each
- Propellers: 2-bladed wooden fixed-pitch propellers

Performance

- Maximum speed: 120 km/h (75 mph, 65 kn)
- Range: 500 km (310 mi, 270 nmi)
- Service ceiling: 3,200 m (10,500 ft)
- Rate of climb: 1.3 m/s (260 ft/min)
- Time to altitude: 1,000 m (3,300 ft) in 12 minutes

Armament

- Guns: 1 x 7.92 mm (0.312 in) Parabellum MG 14 machine gun
- Bombs: 1 x 725 kg (1,598 lb) torpedo

== Bibliography ==
- Admiralty (1988) [1919]. "Merchant Shipping (Losses): British Merchant Vessels Captured or Destroyed by the Enemy". British Vessels Lost at Sea, 1914-18 and 1939-45 (3rd ed.). Wellingborough, UK: Patrick Stephens. pp. 1–99. ISBN 1-85260-134-5.
- Andersson, Lennart & Sanger, Ray (2014). Retribution and Recovery: German Aircraft and Aviation 1919 to 1922. Staplefield, UK: Air-Britain (Historians). ISBN 978-0-85130-467-0.
- Gray, Peter & Thetford, Owen (1987) [1970]. German Aircraft of the First World War (2nd ed.). London: Putnam. ISBN 0-85177-809-7.
- Herris, Jack (2013). Gotha Aircraft of WWI: A Centennial Perspective on Great War Airplanes. Great War Aviation Centennial Series. Vol. 6. Charleston, South Carolina: Aeronaut Books. ISBN 978-1-935881-14-8.
- Klaauw, Bart van der (March–April 1999). "Unexpected Windfalls: Accidentally or Deliberately, More than 100 Aircraft 'arrived' in Dutch Territory During the Great War". Air Enthusiast (80): 54–59. ISSN 0143-5450.
- Metzmacher, Andreas (2021). Gotha Aircraft 1913–1954: From the London Bomber to the Flying Wing Jet Fighter. Brimscombe, UK: Fonthill. ISBN 978-1-78155-706-8.
- Schmeelke, Michael (2020). "Torpedo Los!": The German Imperial Torpedo-Flieger. n.p.: Aeronaut Books. ISBN 978-1-953201-17-1.
- Staff, Gary (2008). Battle for the Baltic Islands 1917: Triumph of the Imperial German Navy. Barnsley, UK: Pen & Sword Maritime. ISBN 978-1-84415-7877.
