= Theener =

- Village of Hagermarsch
- Interactive map of Theener
- Location within Germany Location within Lower Saxony
- Coordinates: 53.65943°N 7.28792°E
- Country: Germany
- State: Lower Saxony
- District: Aurich
- Municipality: Hagermarsch
- Elevation: 1 m (3.3 ft)
- Time zone: UTC+01:00 (CET)
  - Summer (DST): UTC+02:00 (CEST)
- Dialling codes: 04938
- Vehicle registration: 26524

Theener is a village in the region of East Frisia, Lower Saxony, Germany. It is an Ortsteil of the municipality of Hagermarsch, part of the municipal association (Samtgemeinde) of Hage. It is a dispersed settlement to the south of Hilgenriedersiel. Historically, the village was first recorded in 1787 as Thener and has been officially registered under its current name since 1818.
