= Junkersrott =

- Village of Hagermarsch
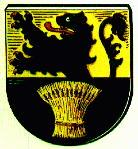
- Coat of arms
- Interactive map of Junkersrott
- Location within Germany Location within Lower Saxony
- Coordinates: 53.65214°N 7.26028°E
- Country: Germany
- State: Lower Saxony
- District: Aurich
- Municipality: Hagermarsch
- Elevation: 1.5 m (4.9 ft)
- Time zone: UTC+01:00 (CET)
  - Summer (DST): UTC+02:00 (CEST)
- Dialling codes: 04938
- Vehicle registration: 26524

Junkersrott is a village in the region of East Frisia, Lower Saxony, Germany. It is an Ortsteil of the municipality of Hagermarsch, part of the municipal association (Samtgemeinde) of Hage. The area was incorporated into the municipality of Hagermarsch during the Lower Saxony municipal reform in 1972. Until then, Junkersrott was an independent municipality.
