= Hilgenried Bay =

Coordinates: 53.65926°N 7.366762°E

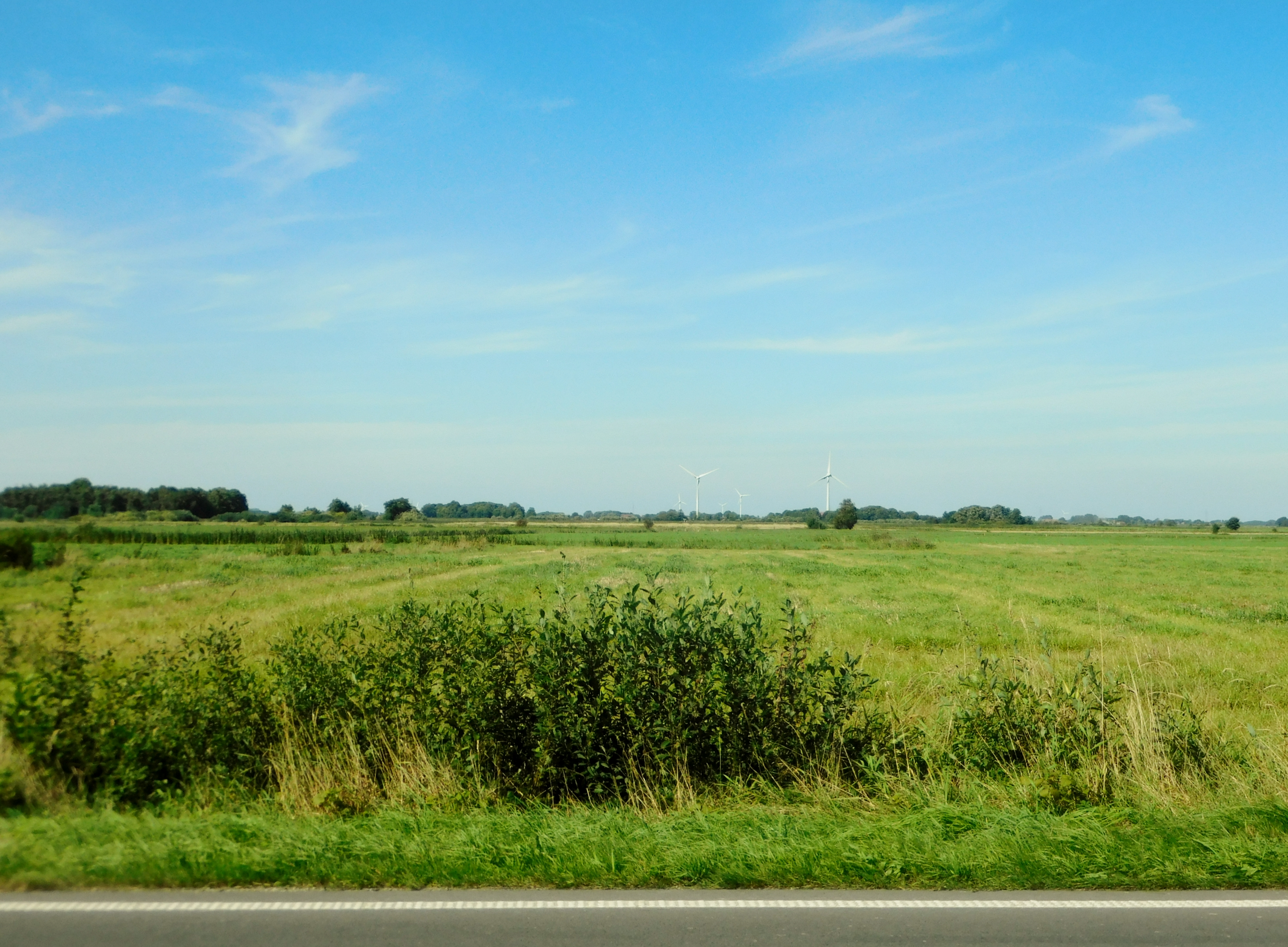
The old bay seen from the edge of the Blandorf-Wichte Geest

Hilgenried Bay (German: Hilgenrieder Bucht) is a bay on the German North Sea coast near Hilgenriedersiel, a village in the municipality of Hagermarsch in the Lower Saxon county of Aurich. It was probably formed during the Dunkirk transgression as a result of the washing out of the mouth of one or more small streams, but has now largely silted up.

In the 9th century, the village of Nesse emerged as a trading settlement and important port. The region around Hilgenried bay was probably the scene of the so-called Battle of Norditi, in 884, a Frisian army under the command of Archbishop Rimbert of Bremen-Hamburg defeated the Danish Vikings, precipitating the complete withdrawal of Vikings from East Frisia.

The bay only needed to be relatively lightly dyked during the High Middle Ages because the local streams only had a very small catchment and did not hinder the reclamation of land greatly. Nesse was cut off from the sea no later than the 13th century and around 1300 the enclosing line of dykes was completed.

== Literature ==
- Hans Homeier: Der Gestaltwandel der ostfriesischen Küste im Laufe der Jahrhunderte. Selbstverlag, Pewsum, 1969
