= Battle of Norditi =

Historical battle

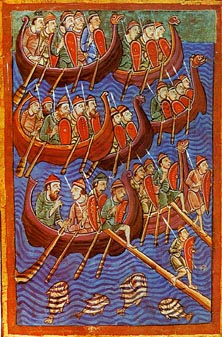
Early depiction of naval seamen. The red shields denote Danes.

The Battle of Norditi (German: Schlacht bei Norditi), Battle of Nordendi (Schlacht von Nordendi) or Battle of Hilgenried Bay (Schlacht an der Hilgenrieder Bucht) was a battle between a Frisian army under Archbishop Rimbert of Bremen-Hamburg and an army of Danish Vikings in 884, which resulted in the complete withdrawal of the Vikings from East Frisia.

== Sources ==
The first known record of the battle was written down in the same year in the Annales Fuldenses on 25 December 884, where, in a short note, a battle between the Frisians and Normans in the gau of Norditi (in loco, qui vocatur Norditi) is mentioned, in which the latter had been defeated. The localisation of this gau as the area that later became Norderland appears to be very likely, even though the town of Norden may not have existed at this point in time. The annals further record that Archbishop Rimbert had composed a letter about the events to Archbishop Liutbert of Mainz, which has not survived however. It is possible that church historian, Adam of Bremen, had this letter before him when he covered the battle in greater detail in the first book of his Gesta Hammaburgensis ecclesiae pontificum and named the place of the battle, in a slight spelling variation, as Nordwidi. The two medieval sources were later embellished in Ubbo Emmius' account in Rerum Frisicarum Historiae in 1546, without appearing to have any other sources to hand.

== Battle ==
In the second half of the 9th century, Danish Vikings established bases on the East Frisian coast, from which they harassed the local population. Archbishop Rimbert of Bremen-Hamburg, who had had to break off his mission to the Vikings in Scandinavia, which had been begun by his predecessor Ansgar, was deeply concerned about this threat to the Church and the Empire. He therefore called on the Frisian population to resist the intruders and personally led them in the autumn of 884.

In the course of the ensuing battle, the Frisian army succeeded in pushing the Vikings back into Hilgenried Bay near Norden (in the municipality of Hagermarsch) where many were surprised by the incoming tide and drowned as they fled. According to Adam of Bremen, Rimbert's words and prayers played a vital part in the successful outcome, whilst local tradition also emphasized the courage and love of freedom of the Frisians. According to Adam of Bremen, 10,377 Vikings were killed in the battle and great treasures were captured by the Frisians, but these figures may be exaggerated. The traditional Norden account also says that, during the battle, Rimbert prayed over a great stone at the St. Ludger's Church. Today, the water that is gathers in its hollows is still said to heal warts.

The liberated estates and captured treasures were subsequently managed as communal property. The Battle of Norditi is thus the foundation story for the Theelacht of Norden, a co-operative tribal association and is one of the possible reasons behind the conferring of "Friesian Freedom" on the Frisian population by the Roman-German emperors.

== Literature ==
- B. Bunte: Die älteste Bezeichnung für Norden, In: Emder Jahrbuch 10, 1892, pp. 119–121.
- R. Folkerts: Die Theelacht zu Norden. Ein seit 1100 Jahren auf genossenschaftlicher Basis geführter Familienverband, 1986.
- Fritz Freese: Lewer doot as Slav. Die Saga der Normannenschlacht im Jahr 884 in der Hilgenrieder Bucht bei Norden. Norden, 1976.
