= Gotha Go 244 =

German transport airplane during World War II

Go 244
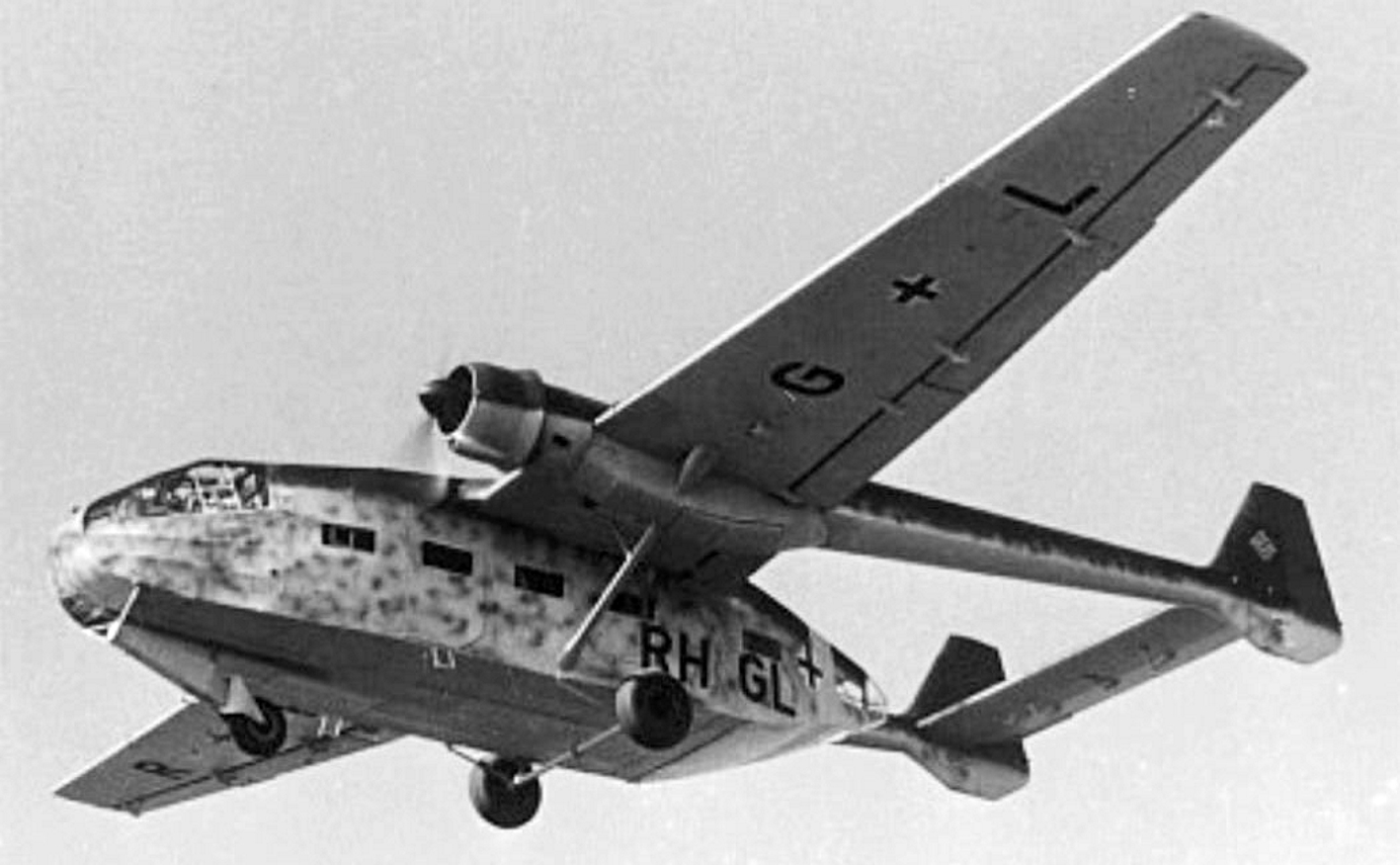

General information
- Type: Military transport monoplane
- National origin: Germany
- Manufacturer: Gotha

History
- Manufactured: 174
- First flight: 1940s
- Developed from: Gotha Go 242

The Gotha Go 244 was a transport aircraft designed and produced by the German aircraft manufacturer Gotha. It was operated by the Luftwaffe during the Second World War. It was the powered version of the Gotha Go 242 military glider transport.

While studies into a powered model of the Go 242 had commenced relatively early in the glider's development, one of the major factors in what would become the Go 244 was the German's capturing of a large quantity of Gnome-Rhône 14M radial engines following the fall of France in June 1940. Three prototypes were created by modifying Go 242s; these were fitted with engines such as the BMW 132 and the Shvetsov M-25 A. Despite the unimpressive performance of the Gnome engines, Luftwaffe officials were keen to make use of existing inventory, thus the majority of production standard Go 244s were powered by this engine.

The first Go 244s were delivered to operational units based in Crete, Greece in March 1942; the type would also see action in both North Africa and the Eastern Front. Far fewer Go 244s were constructed in comparison to the Go 242, which officials ultimately decided to focus their production capacity upon instead. Some figures, such as Generalfeldmarschall Erhard Milch, criticised the aircraft as being defective, lacking sufficient range, and operationally limited. A mixture of Junkers Ju 52 or Messerschmitt Me 323 transport aircraft supplemented and eventually replaced the Go 244 in Luftwaffe service.

== Development ==
Development of the Go 244 has its origins in the widely used Gotha Go 242 military glider, specifically the Go 242B model. Studies for powered versions of the Go 242 had commenced relatively early in the design of the glider; one early proposal involved a modification that would have facilitated the temporary attachment of a single Argus As 10C engine to the nose of the glider, which would have allowed for its recovery back to base after use. This concept was ultimately rejected, the alternative proposal of a permanently powered twin-engined version of the aircraft was taken forward. A key factor in the emergence of the Go 244 had been the fall of France in June 1940. Amongst other effects, Germany gained access to France's aviation industry and its supply chain, which meant that the Luftwaffe suddenly had access to a sizable number of captured Gnome-Rhône 14M radial engines that several officials were keen to make use of.

Three Go 242s were modified as prototypes of the powered Go 244, fitted with surplus radial engines. The first prototype, the Go 244 V1 was powered by two 660 hp (490 kW) BMW 132, while the second prototype had 700 hp (520 kW) Gnome-Rhône 14Ms — and the third 750 hp (560 kW) Shvetsov M-25 A engines, with this model of Shvetsov OKB engine design being essentially a Soviet-built Wright Cyclone American-based nine-cylinder radial. Although only the third Gnome-equipped prototype offered adequate engine out performance, the ample stocks of these engines led to it being selected as the basis for the production conversion — usually fitted in counter-rotating pairs in production — although a few more aircraft were fitted with the BMW and Shvetsov engines.

In August 1941, the Luftwaffe took delivery of the first Go 244A aircraft for testing. It was the Go 244B that was the principal production model; it featured a wheeled tricycle undercarriage and accommodated fuel and oil within the tail booms.

An initial run of 133 aircraft were produced through the conversion of Go 242Bs. A further 41 Go 244s were constructed using new airframes. Officials decided against producing further Go 244s for the assembly lines to revert to Go 242 glider production. One senior Luftwaffe official that had openly criticised the Go 244 was Generalfeldmarschall Erhard Milch, who claimed it to be faulty, lacking sufficient range, and of limited value.

Several proposals and plans were mooted for the further development of the Go 244. One area of interest was the creation of single-engined variants; these would have been powered by either a nose-mounted Argus As 10C or Junkers Jumo 211. During 1944, the company's design team directed their attention towards the Gotha Go 345 transport glider instead.

== Operational history ==
Gotha Go 244 of 4./KGr.zbV 106 on the ground, circa 1942

During March 1942, the first examples of the Go 244 were delivered to operational units stationed in Crete, Greece. Several aircraft were assigned to transport Geschwader in North Africa, their use in this theatre was limited to only a few months after the Go 244 proved to be vulnerable to Allied fighter aircraft and anti-aircraft fire. The type also saw action against the Soviet Union on the Eastern Front. It was used as a troop transport and to carry freight. In Luftwaffe service, the Go 244 was replaced by Junkers Ju 52 or Messerschmitt Me 323 aircraft.

== Variants ==
- Go 244 A-1 - prototype, using the BMW 132 radial engine
- Go 244 B - powered by Gnome-Rhône 14M-06/07 series engines and equipped with variable-pitch propellers
- Go 244 B-1 - production version, with fixed landing gear, based on Go 242 A-1 glider
- Go 244 B-2 - B-1 with improved landing gear including a larger semi-retractable nose wheel, based on Go 242 A-2 glider
- Go 244 B-3 - paratroop-carrying version of B-1 with double rear doors
- Go 244 B-4 - paratroop-carrying version of B-2 with doors of B-3 and landing gear of B-2
- Go 244 B-5 - training version with dual controls
- Go 244 C - analog to Go 244 B but with 04/-05 series engines and equipped with fixed-pitch propellers

== Specifications (Go 244 B-1) ==
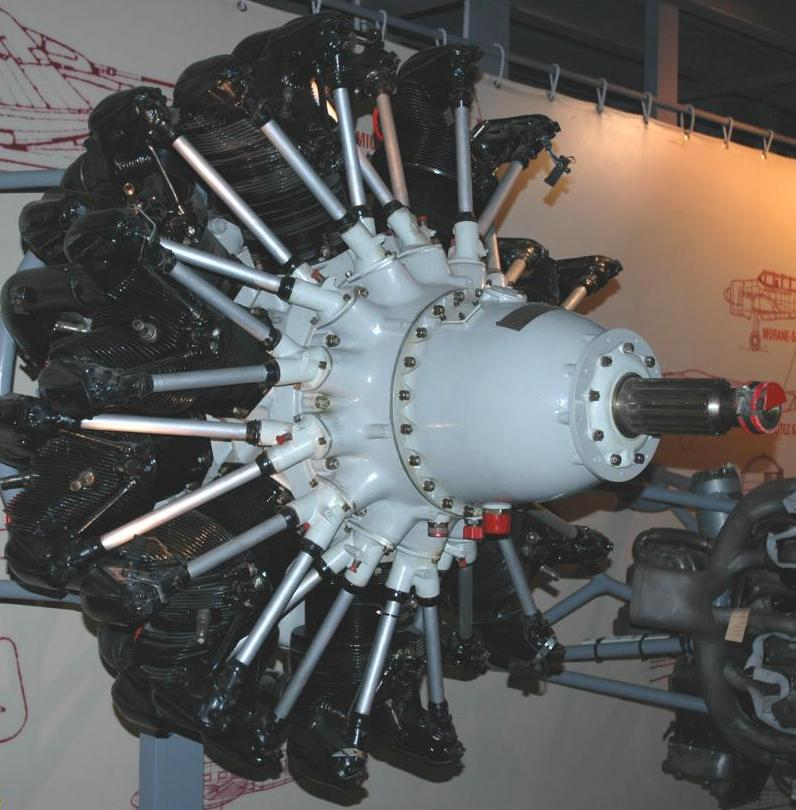
Gnome-Rhone 14M-05 engine

Data from Gotha's Twin-Boom Troopers

General characteristics

- Crew: 1 or 2 pilots
- Capacity: up to 23 troops or freight
- Length: 15.8 m (51 ft 10 in)
- Wingspan: 24.5 m (80 ft 5 in)
- Height: 4.7 m (15 ft 5 in)
- Wing area: 64.4 m^{2} (693 sq ft)
- Empty weight: 5,100 kg (11,244 lb)
- Gross weight: 7,800 kg (17,196 lb)
- Powerplant: 1 × Gnome-Rhône 14M-06 14-cylinder two-row air-cooled radial piston engine (rh rotation), 520 kW (700 hp)
- Powerplant: 1 × Gnome-Rhône 14M-07 14-cylinder two-row air-cooled radial piston engine (lh rotation), 520 kW (700 hp)
- Propellers: 3-bladed variable-pitch propellers (lh & rh rotation)

Performance

- Maximum speed: 290 km/h (180 mph, 160 kn) at 3,000 m (9,800 ft)
- Range: 600 km (370 mi, 320 nmi)
- Ferry range: 740 km (460 mi, 400 nmi)
- Service ceiling: 7,500 m (24,600 ft)
- Time to altitude: 1,000 m (3,300 ft) in three minutes

Armament

- Guns: 3 × 7.92 mm (0.312 in) MG 15 or MG 81 machine guns

== See also ==
Related development

- Go 242

Aircraft of comparable role, configuration, and era

- Fairchild C-82 Packet

Related lists

- List of World War II military aircraft of Germany
- List of military aircraft of Germany
