= Gotha WD.7 =

German reconnaissance floatplane World War I, 1915

WD.7
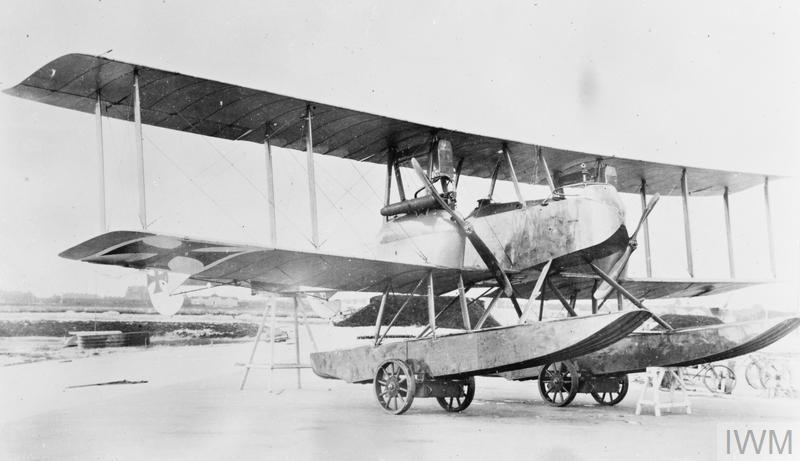
- A forward oblique view of a WD.7 on its beaching trolleys

General information
- Type: Maritime reconnaissance aircraft and torpedo-bomber trainer
- National origin: Germany
- Manufacturer: Gothaer Waggonfabrik
- Designer: Karl Rösner
- Primary user: Imperial German Navy
- Number built: 8

History
- Introduction date: April 1916
- Variant: Gotha WD.8

The Gotha WD.7 (Wasser Doppeldecker; 'Water Biplane') was a twin-engine maritime patrol floatplane developed during World War I by Gothaer Waggonfabrik (Gotha) for the Imperial German Navy's (Kaiserliche Marine) Naval Air Service (Marine-Fliegerabteilung). The prototype was captured by the French on its first combat mission in April 1916 after it was forced to make an emergency landing after an engine failed. Despite this seven additional WD.7s were ordered and were used for training torpedo bomber pilots and for trials. Only a single aircraft is known to have survived the war.

== Background and description ==
The Gotha WD.7 was the company's design to satisfy the Imperial German Navy's Naval Air Service's desire for a maritime version of the multi-purpose Kampfflugzeuge aircraft that was being designed to a requirement issued by the Imperial German Air Service (Die Fliegertruppen des deutschen Kaiserreiches) of the Imperial German Army a few months before the start of World War I in August 1914. These aircraft were intended to conduct reconnaissance and ground attack missions as well as engage enemy aircraft. The Kampfflugzeuge was designed to carry 450 kilograms (990 lb) of useful load for six hours. Lacking any means to allow machine guns to fire between the propeller blades as they spun, a machine gun placed on a rotating mount with a field of fire unimpeded by the propellers was the only way that one aircraft could shoot down another. This relegated the pilot to merely flying within range of an enemy aircraft while his gunners would attempt to destroy their opponent with their machine guns and autocannon. Designers and military aviators likened this to warships at sea which maneuvered to bring their weapons to bear.

The Naval Air Service ordered one prototype from Gotha on 10 May 1915 to meet the broad outlines of the Imperial German Air Service's specification. Designed by Karl Rösner and A. Klaube, the WD.7 was a two-bay biplane with two 120-horsepower (89 kW) Mercedes D.II straight-six engines mounted on the leading edge of the lower wing. The radiators were located above each engine. The aircraft retained the design of the WD.3's nose gunner's position, but it had an entirely new fuselage with the pilot's cockpit behind the gunner's position. It also used the same style of twin-tail structure. The prototype kept the central vertical stabilizer as well, but this was eliminated in the production aircraft. Its floats were attached to the lower wing via struts directly below the engines. A pair of lateral struts reinforced the floats, precluding the aircraft from carrying bombs or torpedoes underneath the fuselage. The gunner was armed with a 7.92 mm (0.312 in) Parabellum MG 14 machine gun on a ring mount.

== History ==
The prototype was delivered to Naval Air Station Flanders I (Seeflugstation Flandern I) at Zeebrugge in Occupied Belgium on 8 February 1916, but inclement weather prevented operational missions for several months. The aircraft was tasked with the morning reconnaissance mission off the Belgian and French coastlines on 2 April, but one engine broke down over Calais, France, and the pilot was able to make an emergency landing north of the port. He attempted to taxi back to Ostend, Belgium, but the WD.7 caught fire and was captured by a French destroyer south of Dunkirk, France.

Seven additional WD.7s were ordered on 24 February; the first six of them used 100 hp (75 kW) Mercedes D.I engines, but the last aircraft was fitted with 120 hp Argus As.II engines. Delivered in June–August, most were used to train torpedo bomber pilots at the seaplane bases in Warnemünde, Apenrade, Norderney and Flensburg. Several aircraft were retained by the Seaplane Experimental Command (Seeflugzeug-Versuchs-Kommando) for testing, including temporarily fitting a WD.7 with Austro-Hungarian 130 hp (97 kW) Hiero engines. One aircraft is known to have been used for trials of the Becker 20 mm (0.8 in) autocannon beginning in late 1916. A 37 mm (1.5 in) autocannon built by DWM was also tested aboard these aircraft. When the Allies inspected the German seaplane bases in December 1918, they recorded a single surviving WD.7 at Hage. Its ultimate fate is unknown, but it was likely scrapped.

The Naval Air Service wanted to conduct comparative trials between single- and twin-engined versions of the same airframe with the same total power. It ordered the WD.8 reconnaissance floatplane prototype in July 1915 that substituted a single 240-horsepower (180 kW) Maybach Mb.IVa engine in the nose. It was not successful and the prototype was later sold to the Ottoman Empire.

== Variants ==
WD.8: one prototype of a single-engine version, powered by a Maybach Mb.IV.

== Specifications (WD.7 prototype) ==
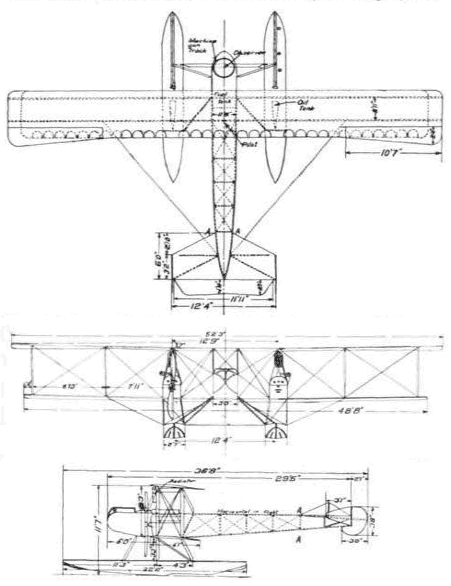
Gotha WD.7 3-view drawing from Aviation and Aeronautical Engineering September 15, 1916

Data from Gotha Aircraft of WWI: A Centennial Perspective on Great War Airplanes; German Aircraft of the First World War

General characteristics

- Crew: 2
- Length: 11.3 m (37 ft 1 in)
- Upper wingspan: 16.8 m (55 ft 1 in)
- Lower wingspan: 14.8 m (48 ft 7 in)
- Height: 3.9 m (12 ft 10 in)
- Wing area: 55.5 m^{2} (597 sq ft)
- Empty weight: 1,275 kg (2,811 lb)
- Gross weight: 1,785 kg (3,935 lb)
- Powerplant: 2 × Mercedes D.II water-cooled straight-six engines, 89 kW (120 hp) each
- Propellers: 2-bladed

Performance

- Maximum speed: 128 km/h (80 mph, 69 kn)
- Range: 475 km (295 mi, 256 nmi)
- Service ceiling: 3,500 m (11,500 ft)
- Time to altitude: 9.5 minutes to 1,000 m (3,300 ft)

- 40 minutes to 2,000 m (6,600 ft)

Armament

- Guns: 1 x ring-mounted 7.92 mm (0.312 in) Parabellum MG 14

== Bibliography ==
- Andersson, Lennart & Sanger, Ray (2014). Retribution and Recovery: German Aircraft and Aviation 1919 to 1922. Staplefield, UK: Air-Britain (Historians). ISBN 978-0-85130-467-0.
- Gray, Peter & Thetford, Owen (1987) [1970]. German Aircraft of the First World War (2nd ed.). London: Putnam. ISBN 0-85177-809-7.
- Grosz, Peter M. (2000). Gotha G.I. Windsock Datafile. Vol. 83. Berkhamsted, UK: Albatros Productions. ISBN 1-902207-25-4.
- Herris, Jack (2013). Gotha Aircraft of WWI: A Centennial Perspective on Great War Airplanes. Great War Aviation Centennial Series. Vol. 6. Charleston, South Carolina: Aeronaut Books. ISBN 978-1-935881-14-8.
- Metzmacher, Andreas (2021). Gotha Aircraft 1913–1954: From the London Bomber to the Flying Wing Jet Fighter. Brimscombe, Stroud: Fonthill. ISBN 978-1-78155-706-8.
- Nowarra, Heinz J.; Robertson, Bruce & Cooksley, Peter G. (1966). Marine Aircraft of the 1914–1918 War. Letchworth, UK: Harleyford Publications. OCLC 123198808.
- Schmeelke, Michael (2020). "Torpedo Los!": The German Imperial Torpedo-Flieger. n.p.: Aeronaut Books. ISBN 978-1-953201-17-1.
- Schmeelke, Michael (2018). Zeebrugge: Naval Air Station Flanders I 1914–1918. Reno, Nevada: Aeronaut Books. ISBN 978-1-935881-46-9.
