= Hilgenriedersiel =

- Village of Hagermarsch
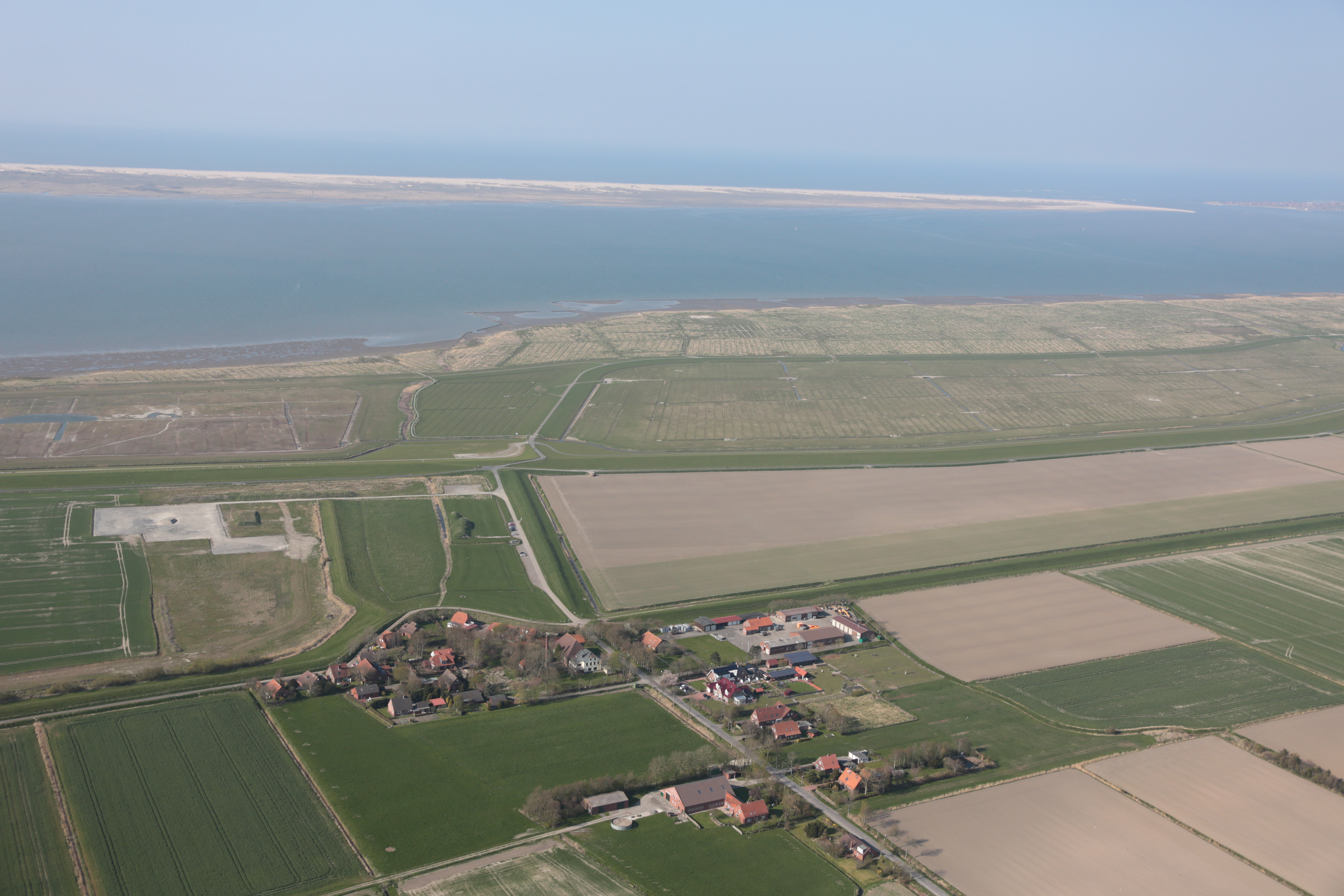
- Aerial view of Hilgenriedersiel
- Interactive map of Hilgenriedersiel
- Location within Germany Location within Lower Saxony
- Coordinates: 53.66496°N 7.28439°E
- Country: Germany
- State: Lower Saxony
- District: Aurich
- Municipality: Hagermarsch
- Time zone: UTC+01:00 (CET)
  - Summer (DST): UTC+02:00 (CEST)
- Dialling codes: 04938
- Vehicle registration: 26524

Hilgenriedersiel is a village in the region of East Frisia, Lower Saxony, Germany. It is an Ortsteil of the municipality of Hagermarsch, part of the municipal association (Samtgemeinde) of Hage. The village borders the Wadden Sea to the north, looks out on the island of Norderney, and has the only natural bathing area on the East Frisian North Sea coast. Near Hilgenriedersiel is the Hilgenried Bay.

== Etymology ==
The village's name has been documented in the spelling Hilgenriedersyhl since 1787. While the second part of the name refers to its location near a lock which was closed in 1925, the first part of the place name is reminiscent of the disappeared water channel Hilgenriede, meaning "holy river".
