= Gotha WD.3 =

1915 German reconnaissance floatplane

WD.3
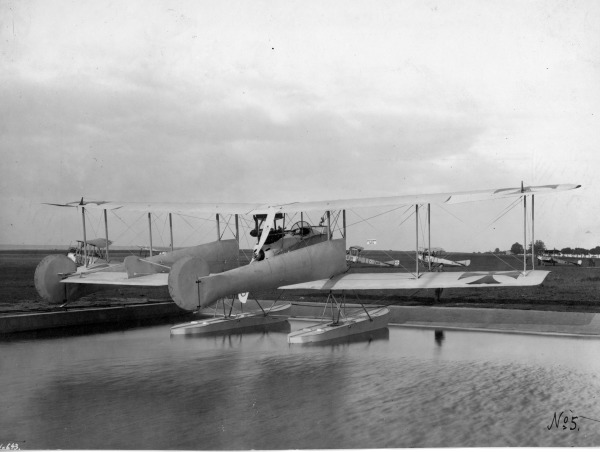
- The WD.3 seen at the factory before its delivery to the Naval Air Service

General information
- Type: Reconnaissance seaplane
- National origin: Germany
- Manufacturer: Gotha
- Designer: Karl Rösner
- Number built: 1

History
- First flight: 1915

The Gotha WD.3 (for Wasser Doppeldecker - "Water Biplane") was a prototype maritime reconnaissance floatplane developed during World War I by Gothaer Waggonfabrik (Gotha) for the Imperial German Navy's (Kaiserliche Marine) Naval Air Service (Marine-Fliegerabteilung). The three-seat aircraft used the pusher configuration with the engine behind the crew. It was lacking in performance compared to aircraft with the more common tractor configuration with the engine in the nose and was not approved for production. The single prototype completed was used as a training aircraft; its ultimate fate is unknown.

== Development and description ==
Gotha had built a series of single-engine maritime reconnaissance floatplanes for the Naval Air Service since 1913, initially patterned on the British Avro 503. These were unarmed scouts, but the German Imperial Naval Office (Reichsmarine-Amt) decided to arm this type of aircraft. In the days before the development of the interrupter gear that allowed a machinegun to fire through the propeller, the most effective way to mount a gun with a forward firing arc was to dispense with a conventional fuselage, relocate the engine to the rear of a nacelle that also carried the cockpit(s), weapons, and wings, and carry the tail structure on booms stretching back either side of the engine and its propeller.

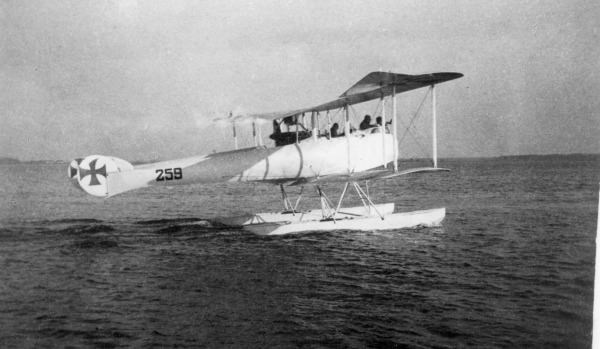
The Gotha WD.3 taxiing; note the three crewmen visible

The WD.3 was a three-seat biplane with twin floats that connected to the wings and nacelle via multiple struts. While Gotha had license-built the French tractor-engined, twin-boom Caudron G.3 as the LD.3 and LD.4, the WD.3 used molded-plywood booms instead of a lattice frame like the G.3. The booms incorporated the inner struts connecting the wings and were also attached to the lower wing. They were connected at their ends by the horizontal stabilizer; in its middle was a small vertical stabilizer. Also at the end of each boom was a rudder. The fuselage nacelle had two cockpits, the forward one for the two observers and the rear one for the pilot. One observer operated the 7.92-millimeter (0.312 in) Parabellum MG14 machinegun and the other worked the wireless telegraph. The rear of the nacelle contained the water-cooled 160-horsepower (120 kW) Mercedes D.III straight-six engine.

== Operational history ==
Karl Rösner, chief designer of Gotha's seaplane department, began work on the WD.3 in August 1914, the same month that World War I began. The prototype was not delivered until 14 September 1915, which lengthy development time showed that the project was not a high priority. Testing by the Seaplane Experimental Command (Seeflugzeug-Versuchs-Kommando) at Warnemünde revealed that the WD.3 was overweight and had mediocre performance. The command therefore ruled out the possibility of any further pusher-configuration aircraft. It used the prototype for training before transferring it to the bases at Stralsund and Wiek where it is known to have made a training flight on 2 August 1916. No WD.3 was located when the Allies inspected the German seaplane bases in December 1918.

== Operators ==
German Empire

- Kaiserliche Marine

== Specifications (WD.3) ==
Data from German Aircraft of the First World War; Gotha Aircraft of WWI: A Centennial Perspective on Great War Airplanes

General characteristics

- Crew: 3
- Upper wingspan: 15.65 m (51 ft 4 in)
- Lower wingspan: 14.35 m (47 ft 1 in)
- Wing area: 54 m^{2} (580 sq ft)
- Empty weight: 1,185 kg (2,612 lb)
- Gross weight: 1,729 kg (3,812 lb)
- Powerplant: 1 × Mercedes D.III water-cooled straight-six piston engine, 120 kW (160 hp)
- Propellers: 2-bladed fixed-pitch pusher propeller

Performance

- Maximum speed: 100 km/h (62 mph, 54 kn)
- Range: 670 km (420 mi, 360 nmi)
- Service ceiling: 2,200 m (7,200 ft)
- Time to altitude: 24 minutes to 1,000 m (3,300 ft)

Armament

- Guns: 1 x 7.92 mm (0.312 in) Parabellum MG 14 machine gun in the nose

== Bibliography ==
- Andersson, Lennart & Sanger, Ray (2014). Retribution and Recovery: German Aircraft and Aviation 1919 to 1922. Staplefield, UK: Air-Britain (Historians). ISBN 978-0-85130-467-0.
- Gray, Peter & Thetford, Owen (1987) [1970]. German Aircraft of the First World War (2nd ed.). London: Putnam. ISBN 0-85177-809-7.
- Guttman, Jon (2009). Pusher Aces of World War 1. Oxford: Osprey Publishing. ISBN 978-1-84603-417-6.
- Herris, Jack (2013). Gotha Aircraft of WWI: A Centennial Perspective on Great War Airplanes. Great War Aviation Centennial Series. Vol. 6. Charleston, South Carolina: Aeronaut Books. ISBN 978-1-935881-14-8.
- Metzmacher, Andreas (2021). Gotha Aircraft 1913-1954: From the London Bomber to the Flying Wing Jet Fighter. Brimscombe, Stroud: Fonthill. ISBN 978-1-78155-706-8.
