= Gothaer Waggonfabrik =

German aircraft and rolling stock manufacturer

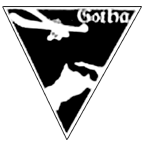
- Type: Subsidiary
- Industry: Rail transport
- Founded: 1880; 146 years ago
- Defunct: 1997
- Headquarters: Berlin, Germany
- Area served: Worldwide
- Parent: Orenstein & Koppel

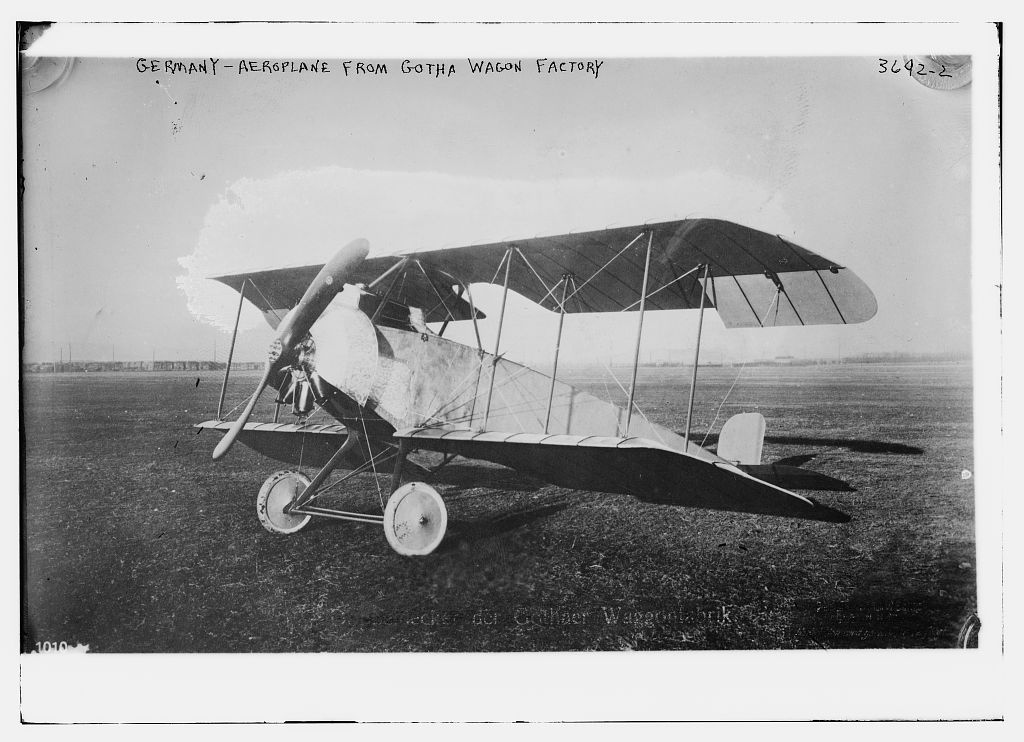
Gothaer Waggonfabrik LD.5 airplane in 1915

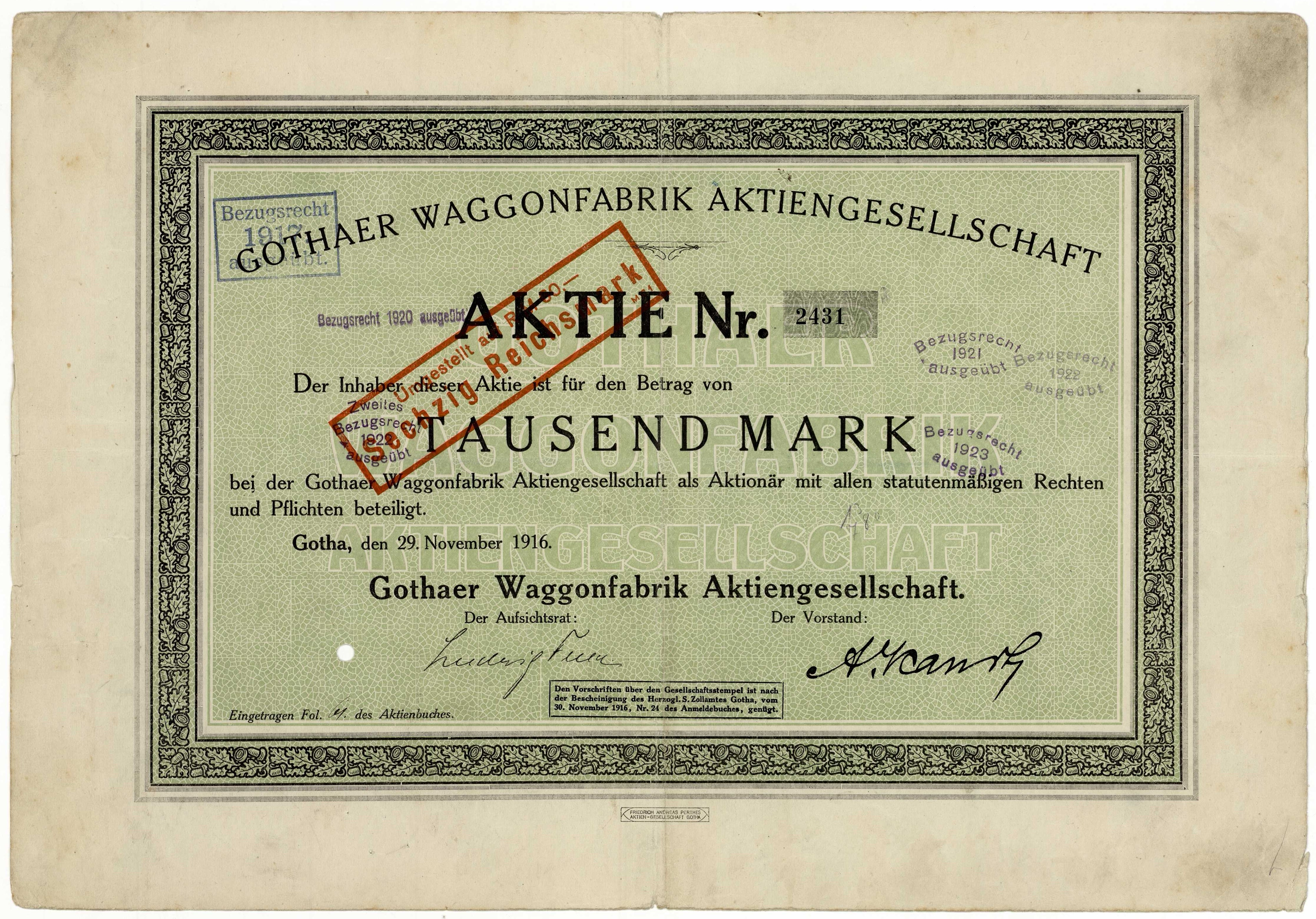
Share of the Gothaer Waggonfabrik AG, issued 29 November 1916

Gothaer Waggonfabrik (German pronunciation: [ˈɡoːtaɐ̯ vaˈɡɔ̃faˌbʁiːk], lit. 'Gotha Wagon Factory') was a German manufacturer of rolling stock established in the late nineteenth century at Gotha. During the two world wars, the company expanded into aircraft building.

== World War I ==
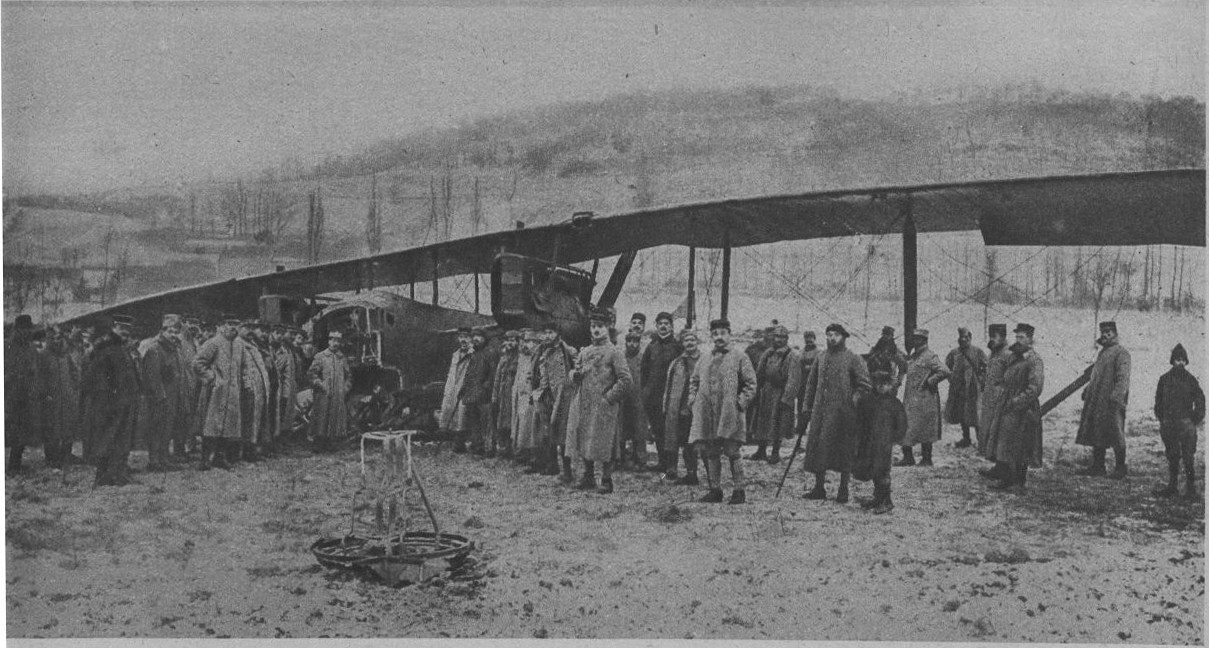
AEG G.IV crash 23 December 1917

In World War I, Gotha was the manufacturer of a highly successful series of bombers based on a 1914 design by Oskar Ursinus and developed by Hans Burkhard. From 1917, the Burkhard-designed twin pusher biplane bomber aircraft were capable of carrying out strategic bombing missions over England, the first heavier-than-air aircraft used in this role. Several dozen of these bombers were built in a number of subtypes - the Ursinus-based Gotha G.I, and the succeeding Burkhard-designed G.II, G.III, G.IV, and G.V. This last variant was the most prolific, with thirty-six in squadron service at one point.

== Inter war years ==
Whilst Germany was prohibited from military aircraft manufacture by the Treaty of Versailles, Gotha returned to its railway endeavours, but returned to aviation with the rise of the Nazi government and the abandonment of the Treaty's restrictions.

=== Auto-production 1921–1928 ===
In 1921 the company purchased Automobilwerk Eisenach, thereby entering automobile production and, with the Dixi 3/15 DA-1 playing an important part in expanding the German auto-market to buyers who hitherto would have ridden motorcycles, if at all. The company encountered a cash crisis in 1928 and the Dixi branded auto-business was sold to BMW: the Dixi 3/15 DA-1 was rebadged in 1928 as the BMW 3/15 DA-2, the name by which today the little car is better remembered.

In 1924 the Cyklon Maschinenfabrik, a manufacturer that had concentrated on motor-bikes and cycle cars came to be merged into the larger Gothaer Waggonfabrik business, through a rather indirect route of company purchases and sales. This gave Cyklon access to the viable sales and distribution network of Dixi and aspirations to become a serious auto-producer. Between 1927 and 1929 the company produced the Cyklon 9/40 which at the time was the most inexpensive six cylinder powered car sold in Germany. The conservative looking car featured a modern all-steel body produced by Germany's leading producer of steel car bodies, Ambi-Budd's Berlin based business. It was, in fact, the first all-steel standard car body produced by Ambi-Budd in Berlin and, incongruously to some modern readers, was shared with the Adler Standard 6, a more powerful and higher priced six cylinder car from one of Germany's mainstream auto-makers of the 1930s. The sale by Gothaer Waggonfabrik of the cash-strapped Dixi business to BMW meant an end to Cyklon's access to a sales network, and highlighted the lack of cash for running the auto-business which rapidly fizzled out after 1928, although Cyklon was not formally wound up until 1931.

== World War II ==
Gotha's main contribution to the new Luftwaffe was the Gotha Go 145 trainer, of which 1,182 were built. The firm also produced the Gotha Go 242 assault glider and licence-built Messerschmitt Bf 110. Perhaps the most famous Gotha product of World War II, however, was an aircraft that never entered service, the Horten Ho 229. This was an exotic jet-powered, flying wing fighter aircraft designed by the Horten brothers, who lacked the facilities to mass-produce it. Two prototypes flew, the second (powered) version lost in an accident on its third flight. The third prototype- built to a modified design - was almost complete and four more were in various stages of manufacture before the end of the war. The Ho 229 V3 ended up in American hands, and is currently at the NASM's Udvar-Hazy Center, under evaluation for restoration.

On 22 February 1944, a squadron of American bombers was sent from Britain to bomb the factory, but due to bad weather, the mission was cancelled before they reached Gotha. On the way back, the Dutch border city of Nijmegen was bombed instead as a 'target of opportunity', killing hundreds of civilians.

On 24 February 1944, 239 American B-24s were dispatched to the primary target at Gotha, Germany (169 bomb Gotha); the lead bombardier from 2AD suffered from anoxia due to a faulty oxygen mask and mistook Eisenach as the primary target, 43 other B-24s released on his mistake (44 bomb Eisenach); they claimed 50-10-20 Luftwaffe aircraft; 34 B-24s were lost and 29 were damaged; casualties were: 3 KIA, 6 WIA and 324 MIA.

== Post war ==
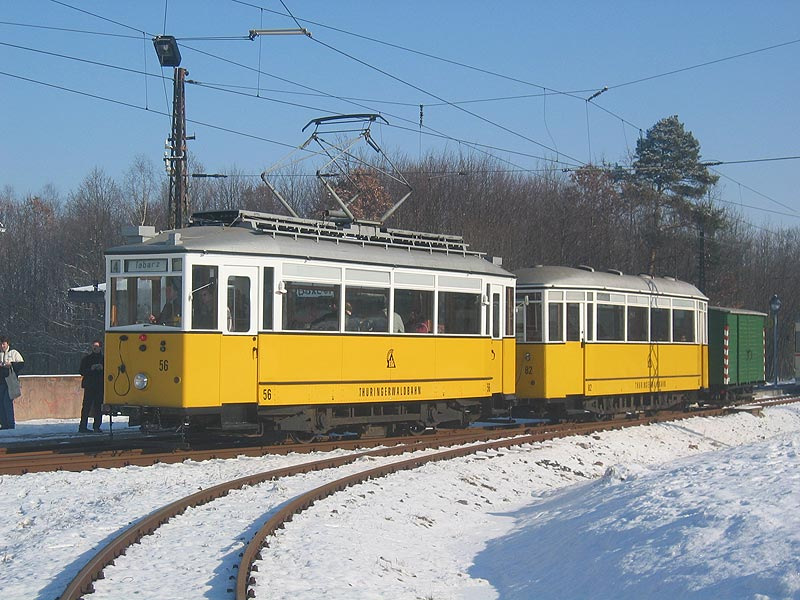
A Gotha tram built in the late 1920s

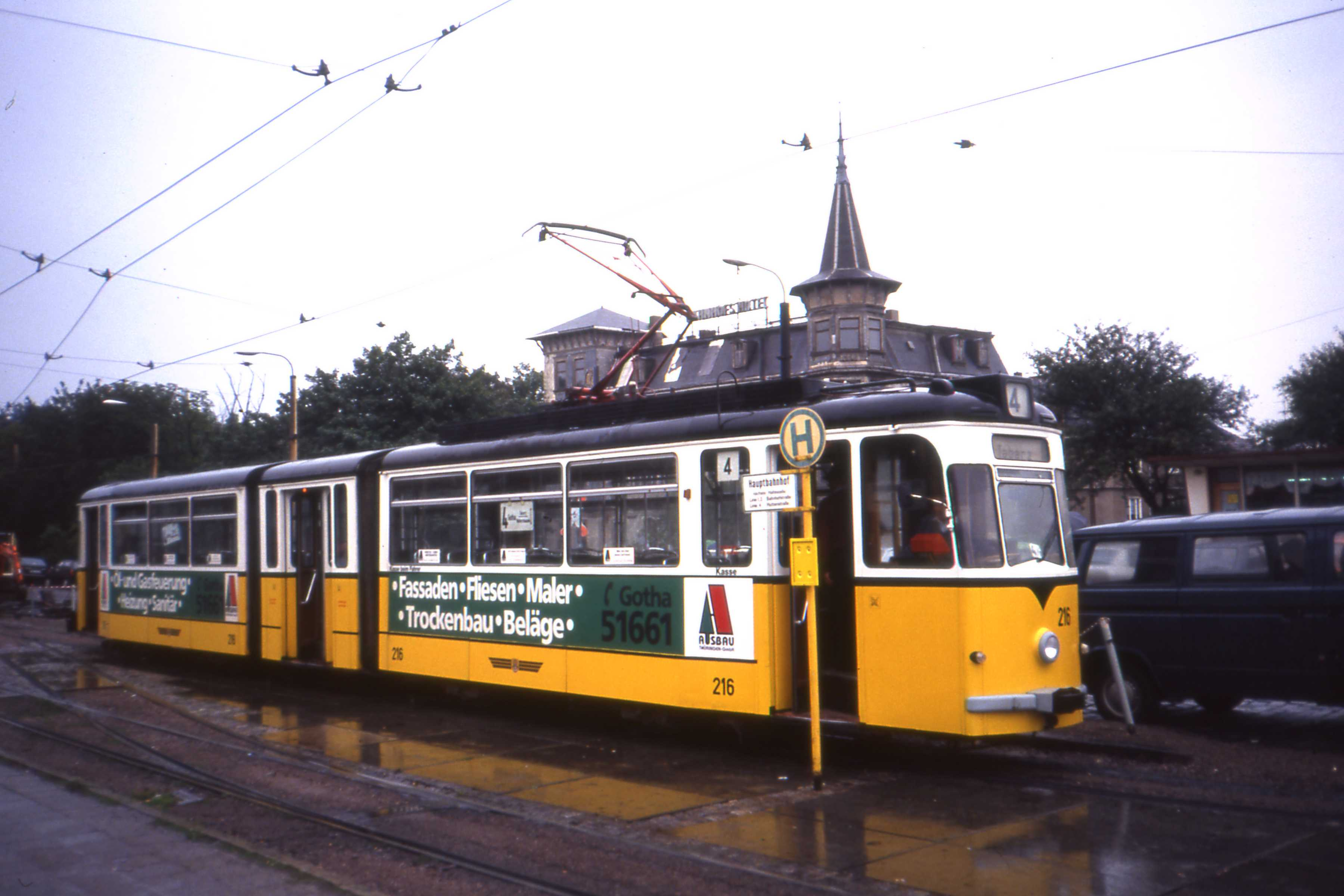
Gothawagen "G4" in Gotha.

Following the war, VEB Waggonbau Gotha once again returned to its original purpose, building trams and light rail vehicles in the former East Germany.

One of the most successful models was the G4, named after its four axles, of which 319 units were built. In late 1959 the first prototype was finished and named EGT59, with a design based on the two-axle T57/B57. The G4 followed the two-rooms-and-a-bath lay-out that was successfully marketed in West Germany by Credé. The three-section trams were 21.7 m long and only 2.2 m wide. The production started in 1961; this tramtype is sometimes referred to as G4-61 and an updated version G4-65.

Tram production ended in 1967, after East Germany started importing ČKD-Tatra trams from Czechoslovakia.

=== Wartburg ===
From 1983 on, parts for the Wartburg 535/1.3 were produced. After the end of the Wartburg production in Eisenach after 1991 the production concentrated on truck trailers. In 1997 the company was split up and privatised by the Treuhandanstalt.

=== Trucks ===
Today the Schmitz Cargobull Gotha GmbH (production site of Schmitz Cargobull AG) produces around 4,000 truck trailers per year. The second successor is the Gothaer Fahrzeugtechnik GmbH, which produces lattice mast elements for mobile cranes and welded components.

== List of aircraft ==
Gotha aircraft included:

- Gotha B.I/II
- Gotha G.I
- Gotha G.II
- Gotha G.III
- Gotha G.IV
- Gotha G.V
- Gotha G.VI
- Gotha G.VII
- Gotha G.IX
- Gotha G.X
- Gotha LD.1
- Gotha WD.2
- Gotha WD.3
- Gotha WD.7, seaplane trainer, 1916
- Gotha WD.11,
- Gotha WD.14,
- Gotha WD.27,
- Gotha Go 145, trainer
- Gotha Go 146, small transport (twin-engine), 1935
- Gotha Go 147, STOL reconnaissance (prototype)
- Gotha Go 149, military trainer, two built
- Gotha Go 150, light aircraft
- Horten Ho 229, fighter (flying-wing), Gotha was selected for mass-production
- Gotha Go 242, transport glider
- Gotha Go 244, transport
- Gotha Go 345, assault glider
- Gotha Ka 430, transport glider
- Gotha Taube a variation of the Etrich Taube

== See also ==
- List of RLM aircraft designations
