= Gotha Ka 430 =

German military transport glider

Ka 430
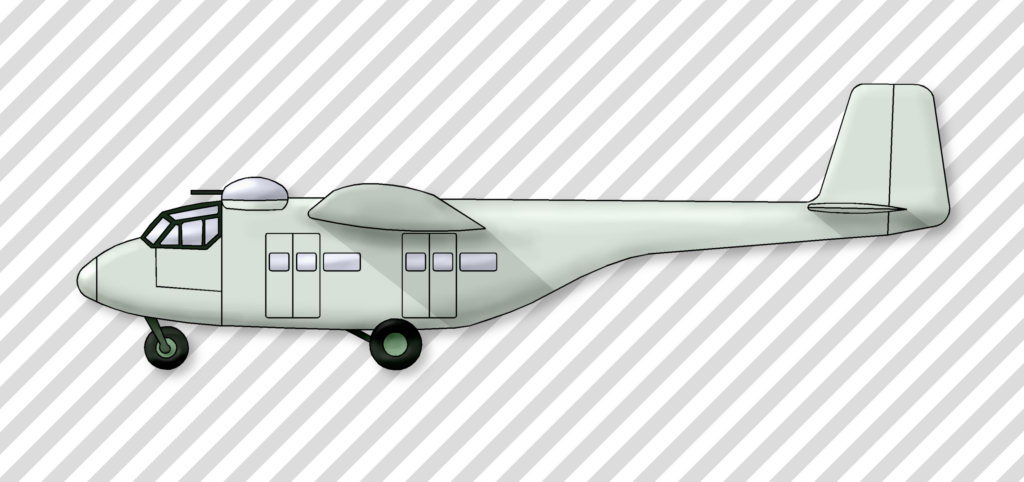

General information
- Type: Transport glider
- National origin: Germany
- Manufacturer: Gotha
- Designer: Albert Kalkert
- Status: prototypes only
- Number built: 12

History
- First flight: 27 March 1944

The Gotha Ka 430 was a military transport glider, first built in 1944. The glider was designed by Albert Kalkert. Twelve had been produced by the end of World War II, but none of them was used operationally.

The glider could carry twelve men, and tests were being conducted towards the end of the war to see if it could carry a cargo of 1,400 kg (3,100 lb). A single 13 mm (0.512 in) MG 131 machine gun was fitted for self-defence.

== Specifications ==
Data from Die Deutsche Luftruestung 1933–1945 Vol.2 – Flugzeugtypen Erla-Heinkel

General characteristics

- Crew: 2
- Capacity: 12 troops / 1,700 kg (3,750 lb)
- Length: 13.22 m (43 ft 4 in)
- Wingspan: 19.5 m (64 ft 0 in)
- Height: 4.17 m (13 ft 8 in)
- Wing area: 39.9 m^{2} (429 sq ft)
- Empty weight: 1,810 kg (3,990 lb)
- Gross weight: 4,600 kg (10,141 lb)

Performance

- Never exceed speed: 320 km/h (200 mph, 170 kn)
- Maximum glide ratio: 14:1
- Maximum towing speed 218 km/h (135 mph; 118 kn)

Armament

- 1 × 13 mm (0.512 in) MG 131 machine gun in dorsal turret

== Bibliography ==
- Metzmacher, Andreas (2021). Gotha Aircraft 1913-1954: From the London Bomber to the Flying Wing Jet Fighter. Brimscombe, Stroud: Fonthill. ISBN 978-1-78155-706-8.
