= Gotha Go 149 =

Military aircraft developed in Germany in the mid-1930s

Go 149
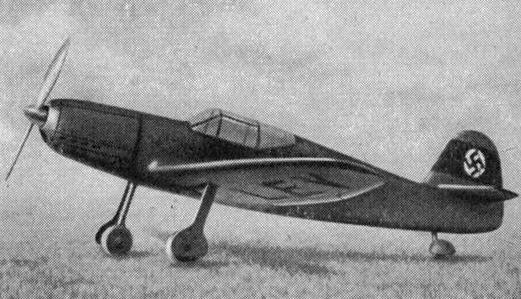

General information
- Type: Military trainer
- National origin: Germany
- Manufacturer: Gotha
- Designer: Albert Kalkert
- Number built: 2

History
- First flight: 1936

The Gotha Go 149 was a military aircraft developed in Germany in the mid-1930s for training fighter pilots. It was a conventional low-wing cantilever monoplane with tailwheel undercarriage, the main units of which retracted inwards. The wing was wooden, while the monocoque fuselage was metal. Two prototypes were constructed, and an armed version was also proposed as a light home-defence fighter (Heimatschutzjäger) armed with two 7.92 mm (.312 in) MG 17 machine guns, but the Luftwaffe did not purchase either version of the design, and no further examples were built.

== Specifications ==
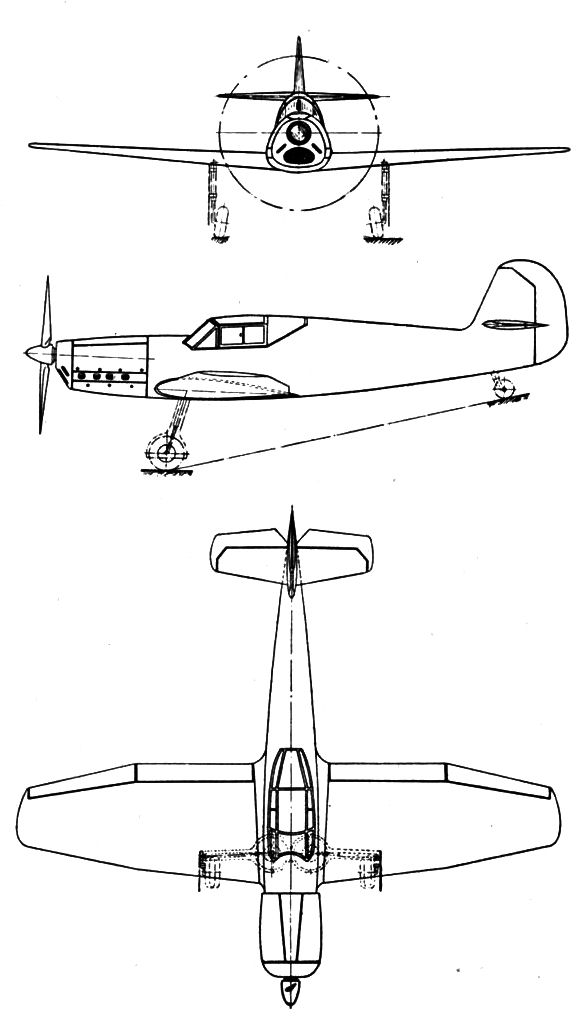
Gotha Go.149 3-view drawing from L'Aerophile February 1938

General characteristics

- Crew: One pilot
- Length: 7.31 m (24 ft 0 in)
- Wingspan: 7.80 m (25 ft 7 in)
- Height: 2.08 m (6 ft 10 in)
- Wing area: 11.6 m^{2} (125 sq ft)
- Empty weight: 830 kg (1,830 lb)
- Gross weight: 1,060 kg (2,340 lb)
- Powerplant: 1 × Argus As 10C , 180 kW (240 hp)

Performance

- Maximum speed: 345 km/h (214 mph, 186 kn)
- Range: 800 km (500 mi, 430 nmi)
- Service ceiling: 5,000 m (16,400 ft)
- Rate of climb: 7.4 m/s (1,460 ft/min)
