= Gotha Go 147 =

1936 German experimental aircraft

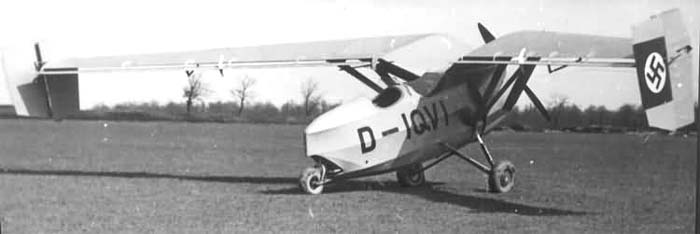

General information
- Type: Fighter aircraft
- Designer: Gothaer Waggonfabrik and Dr. A. Kupper
- Primary user: Germany
- Number built: 2

History
- Introduction date: 1936

The Gotha Go 147 was a German experimental two-seat tailless aircraft designed in 1936 by Gothaer Waggonfabrik and Dr. A. Kupper. Two examples were built and flown. Development was abandoned before the start of World War II.

== Design and development ==
The original aim was to create a two-seat fighter with an exceptional field of fire for the tail gunner. The design featured a high-mounted gull wing, gently tapered and swept back to give a leading-edge sweep of 38 degrees. The gull centre section had a straight leading edge, while endplate fins and rudders were mounted on the tips. The crew sat in tandem behind the single engine.

An experimental prototype was first constructed, designated the Go 147a. With a length of 20 feet 7 inches (6.27 m) and powered by a Siemens Sh 14A air-cooled radial engine delivering 140 horsepower (100 kW).

Flight tests demonstrated instability, but showed enough promise for a production prototype, the Go 147b, to be built. Several roles were now under consideration, including gunnery training, a twin-engined fighter with a second, pusher engine in the rear, and an observation aircraft. Featuring an N-strut braced wing with full-span trailing-edge slotted flaperons, the design also had a fixed undercarriage. Construction was conventional, with welded steel-tube fuselage and wooden two-spar wing. Power came from a more powerful 240 horsepower (180 kW) Argus engine. Although planned, no armament was fitted.

== Operational history ==
The Go 147a first flew in 1936. During trials, a number of stability problems were encountered.

The redesigned Go 147b was registered as D-IQVI. Extensive trials failed to cure its poor flight characteristics and the project was terminated in 1938 or 1939.

== Specification (Go 147b) ==
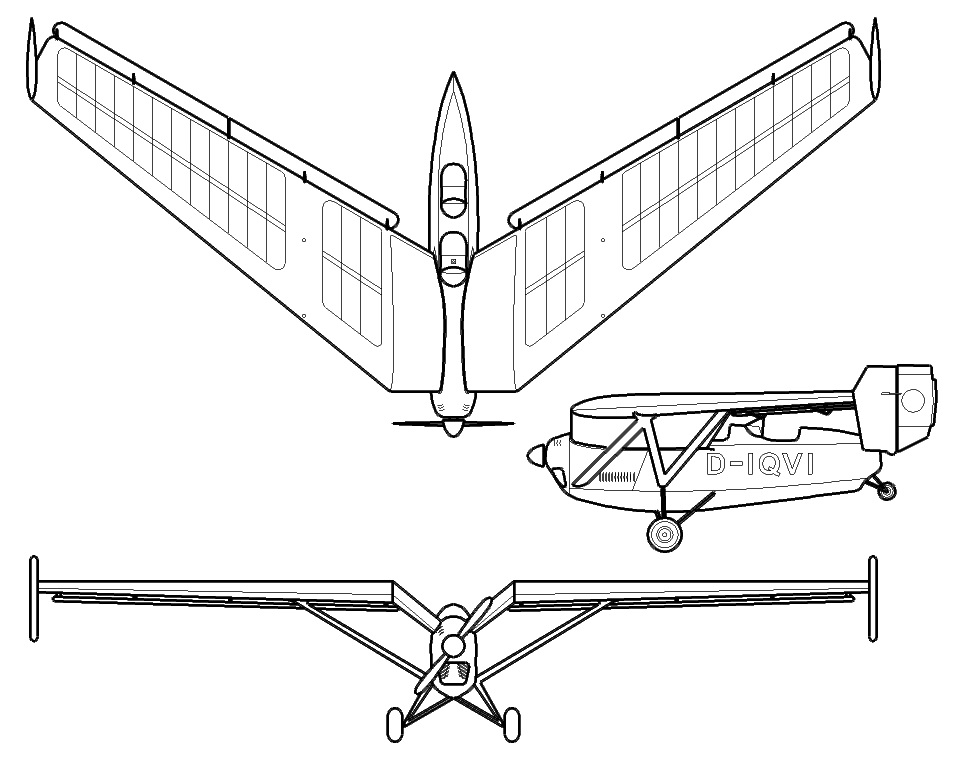

Data from Green (1979).

General characteristics

- Crew: 2
- Length: 19 ft 3 in (5.87 m)
- Wingspan: 40 ft 1.5 in (12.230 m)
- Height: 9 ft 6 in (2.90 m)
- Wing area: 209 sq ft (19.4 m^{2})
- Empty weight: 2,083 lb (945 kg)
- Gross weight: 2,524 lb (1,145 kg)
- Powerplant: 1 × Argus As 10 air-cooled 8-cylinder inverted-vee, 240 hp (180 kW) takeoff power
- Propellers: 2-bladed

Performance

- Maximum speed: 137 mph (220 km/h, 119 kn) at sea level
- Cruise speed: 121 mph (195 km/h, 105 kn) at 6,560 feet (2,000 m)
- Service ceiling: 18,045 ft (5,500 m)

== See also ==
- Westland-Hill Pterodactyl V: Near-contemporary of similar role and configuration.
- Gotha Go 229: Later Gotha tailless flying wing, also known as the Horten Ho 229.

== Bibliography ==
- Metzmacher, Andreas (2021). Gotha Aircraft 1913-1954: From the London Bomber to the Flying Wing Jet Fighter. Brimscombe, Stroud: Fonthill. ISBN 978-1-78155-706-8.
