= Rudolf Ströbinger =

Czech journalist and writer

Rudolf Ströbinger (1931, Hage –2005) was a German journalist and writer.
