= Berum, Hage =

Berum
- Village of Hage
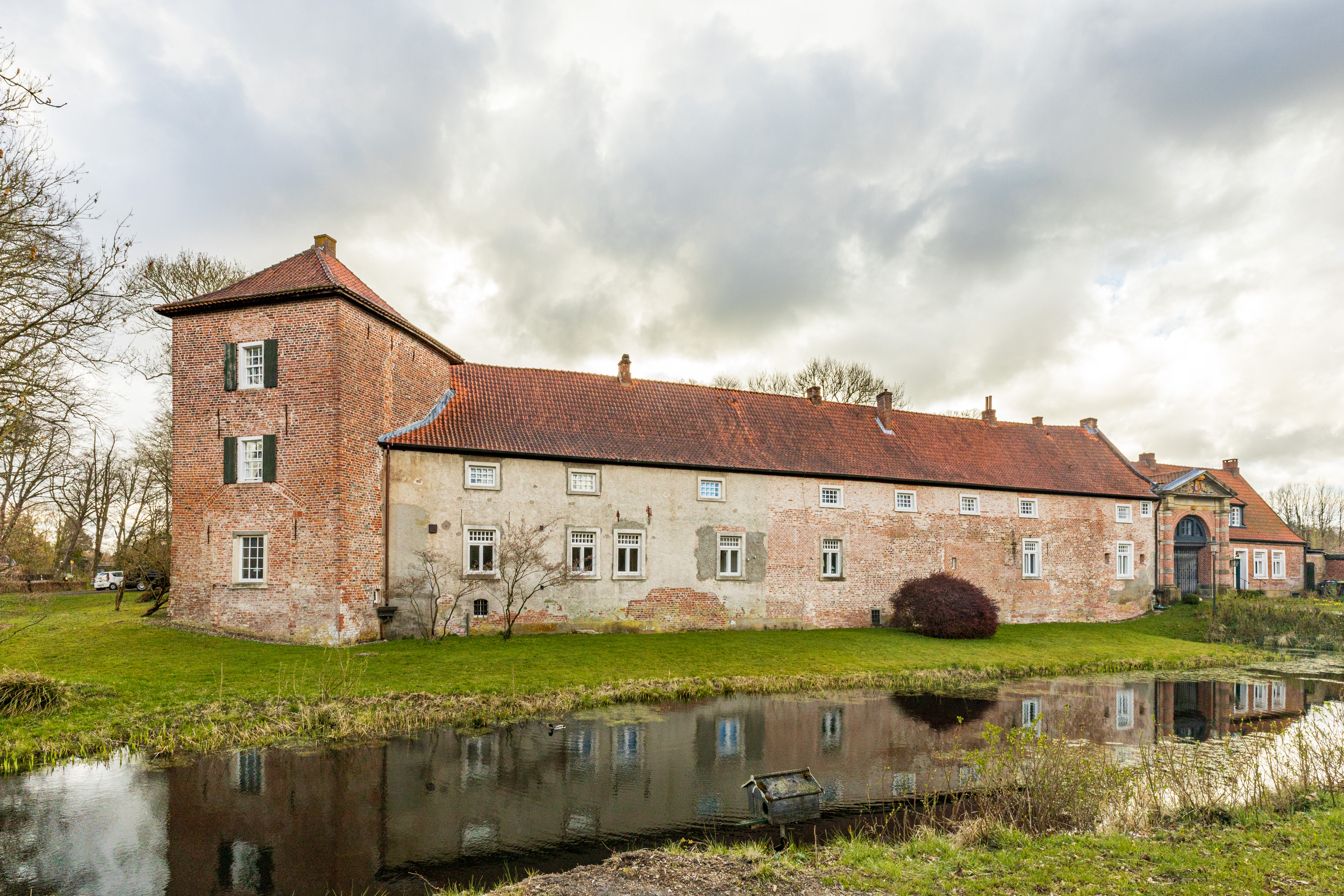
- Berum Castle

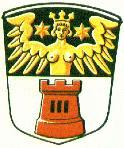
- Coat of arms
- Interactive map of Berum
- Location within Germany Location within Lower Saxony
- Coordinates: 53.60203°N 7.29880°E
- Country: Germany
- State: Lower Saxony
- District: Aurich
- Municipality: Hage

Area
  - Metro: 1.65 km^{2} (0.64 sq mi)
- Elevation: 2.6 m (8.5 ft)

Population
  - Metro: 250
- Time zone: UTC+01:00 (CET)
  - Summer (DST): UTC+02:00 (CEST)
- Dialling codes: 04931
- Vehicle registration: 26524

Berum is a village in the region of East Frisia, Lower Saxony, Germany. It is an Ortsteil of the municipality of Hage, part of the municipal association (Samtgemeinde) of Hage.

The village is mostly known for Berum Castle, believed to date from c. 1310.

== Etymology ==
Berum is a former chieftain's seat, where Marten Sidtzen lived in 1387. As early as the Middle Ages, there was a so-called "Uthof" here, a kind of permanent outstation of a herd of the Norder Geest. The place was first recorded in documents as Berne or Berum in 1408. The current spelling has been officially used since 1436. The settlement name represents the dative plural of Old Frisian bēre, "shed".

== Gallery ==
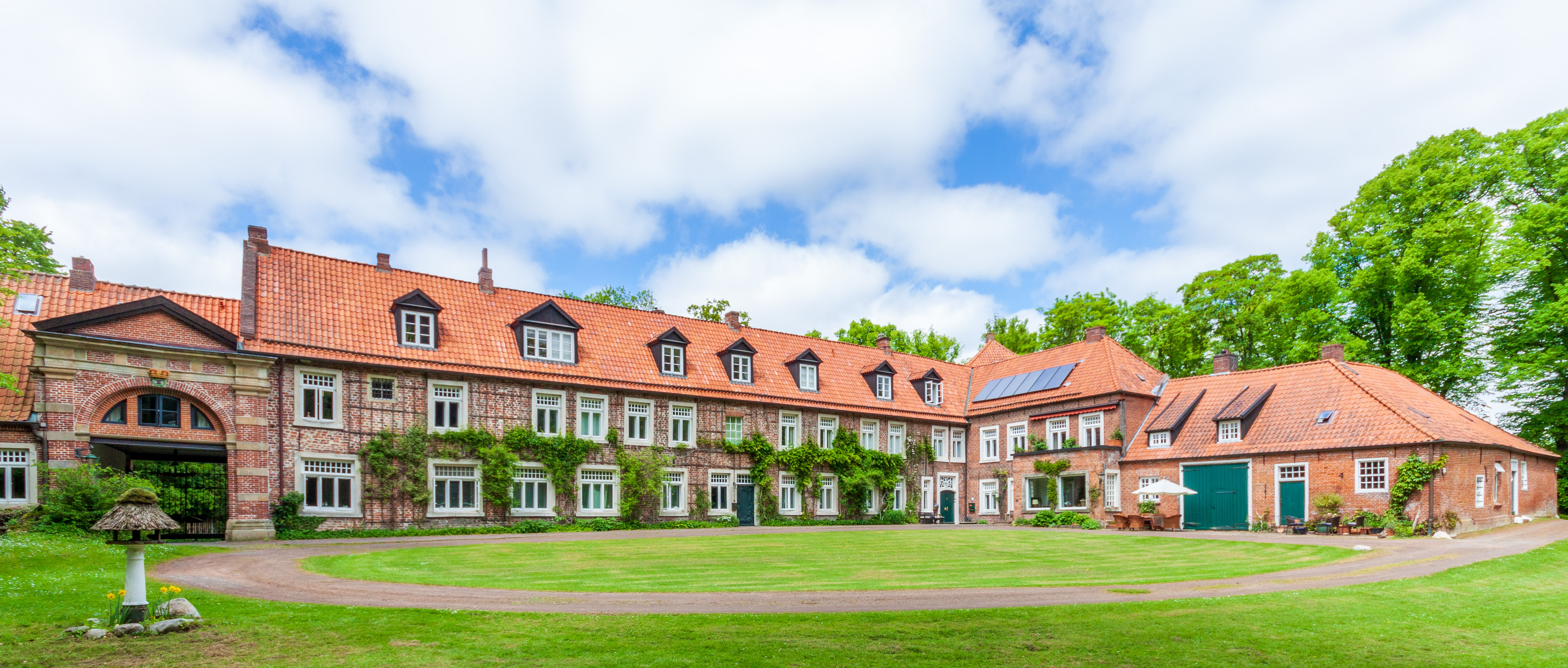
Inner courtyard of the castle

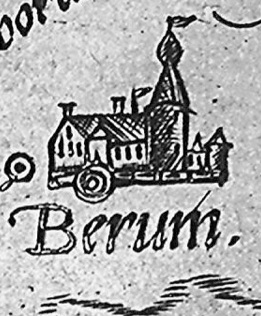
Berum on a map of David Fabricius, 1613

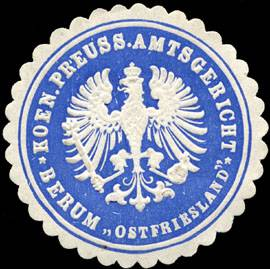
Seal of the Royal Prussian District Court of Berum
