= Gotha Go 345 =

1940s German military transport glider prototype

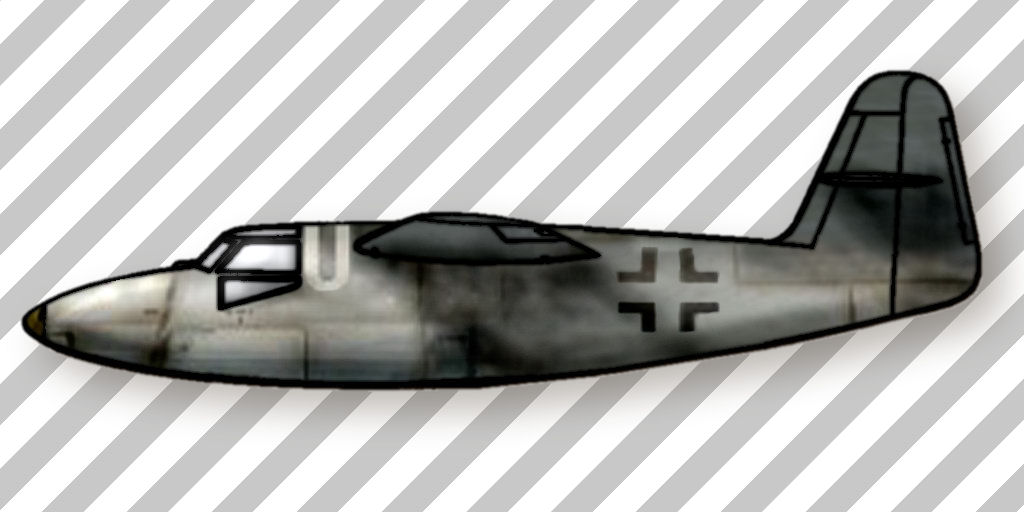

General information
- Type: Troop glider
- National origin: Germany
- Manufacturer: Gotha
- Number built: One prototype

History
- First flight: 1944

The Gotha Go 345 was a prototype German military transport glider of the Second World War. A single example was tested in 1944.

== Variants ==
Go 345A
The assault transport base-line version, optionally fitted with 2x Argus As014 pulse-jet sustainer engines under the wings.
Go 345B
A dedicated cargo variant with no provision for passengers. A shortened nose swung upwards complete with the crew compartment to gain access to the cargo compartment; one built.

== Specifications (Go 345A) ==
Data from , German gliders in World War II, Hitler's Luftwaffe

General characteristics

- Crew: 2
- Capacity: 18 troops / 4,500 kg (10,000 lb) cargo
- Length: 13 m (42 ft 8 in)
- Wingspan: 21 m (68 ft 11 in)
- Height: 4.2 m (13 ft 9 in)
- Wing area: 49.9 m^{2} (537 sq ft)
- Empty weight: 2,470 kg (5,445 lb)
- Max takeoff weight: 6,000 kg (13,228 lb)

Performance

- Normal towing speed: 310 km/h (190 mph; 170 kn)
- Maximum towing speed: 370 km/h (230 mph; 200 kn)
