= Hagermarsch =

- Municipality
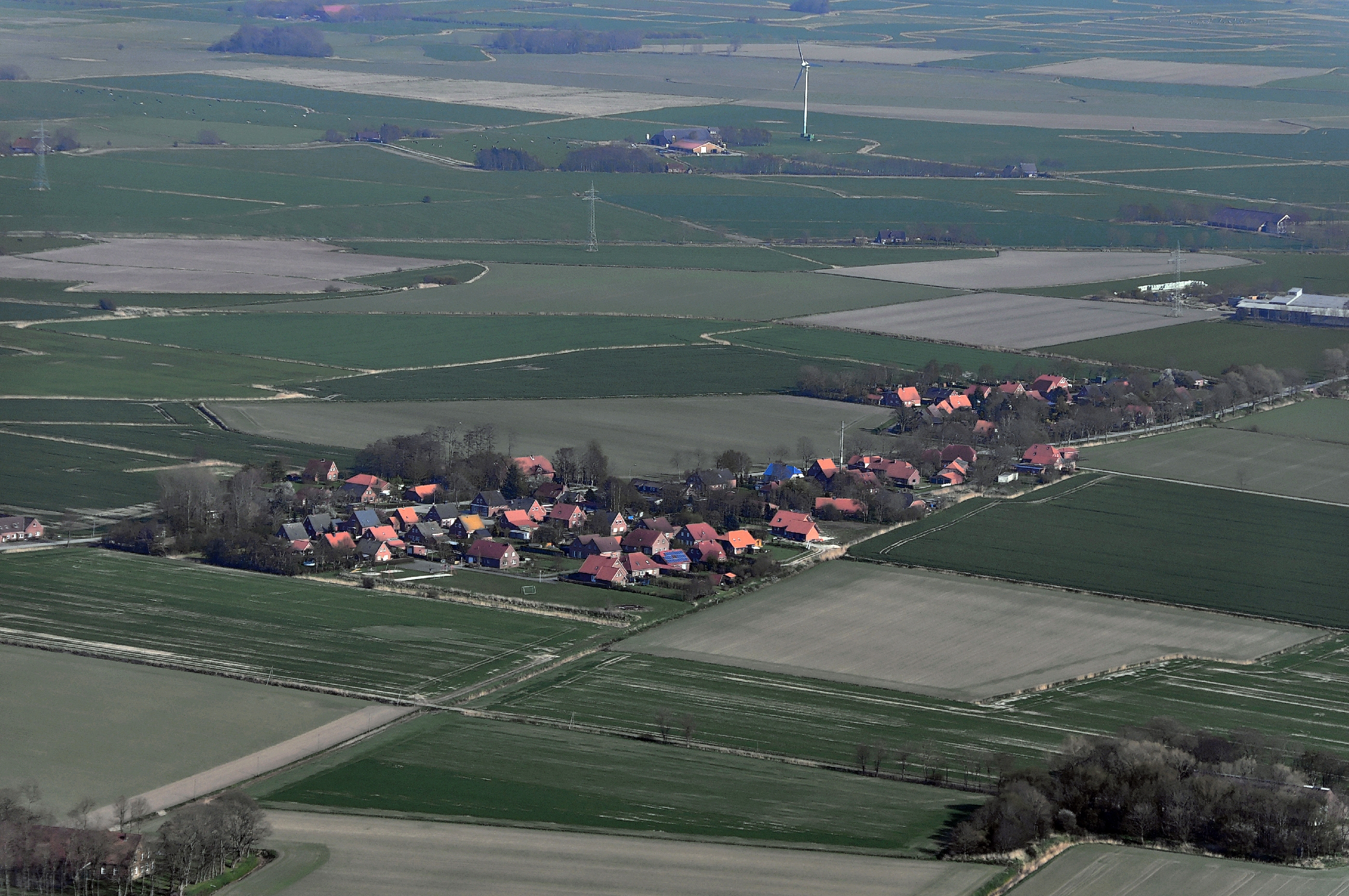
- Aerial view of Hagermarsch

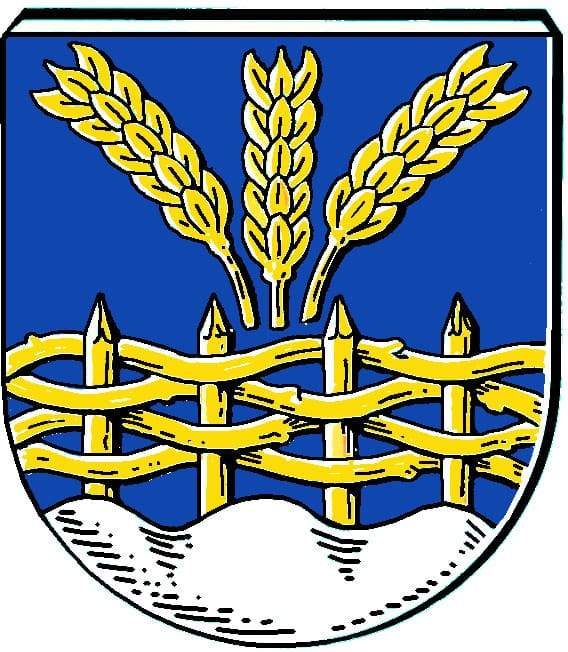
- Coat of arms

- Location of Hagermarsch within Aurich
- Interactive map of Hagermarsch
- Location within Germany Location within Lower Saxony
- Coordinates: 53°38′N 07°17′E
- Country: Germany
- State: Lower Saxony
- District: Aurich
- Municipal assoc.: Hage
- Subdivisions: 3 Ortsteile

Government
  - Mayor: Richard Gloger (FW)

Area
  - Total: 22.32 km^{2} (8.62 sq mi)
- Elevation: 2 m (6.6 ft)

Population (2025-12-31)
  - Total: 428
  - Density: 19.2/km^{2} (49.7/sq mi)
- Time zone: UTC+01:00 (CET)
  - Summer (DST): UTC+02:00 (CEST)
- Postal codes: 26524
- Dialling codes: 0 49 38
- Vehicle registration: AUR, NOR

Hagermarsch is a village and municipality in the district of Aurich, in Lower Saxony, Germany. It is located northeast of the city of Norden. Together with four other municipalities in the region, it is part of the municipal association (Samtgemeinde) of Hage, of which Hagermarsch is the smallest population-wise.

The municipal area consists of the districts of Hagermarsch, Hilgenriedersiel, Theener, and Junkersrott. While the first three villages had already formed a municipality before the administrative reform in Lower Saxony, Junkersrott was an independent municipality until the reform in 1972.
