= Berum Castle =

Castle in Germany

- Burg Berum
- Hage-Berum
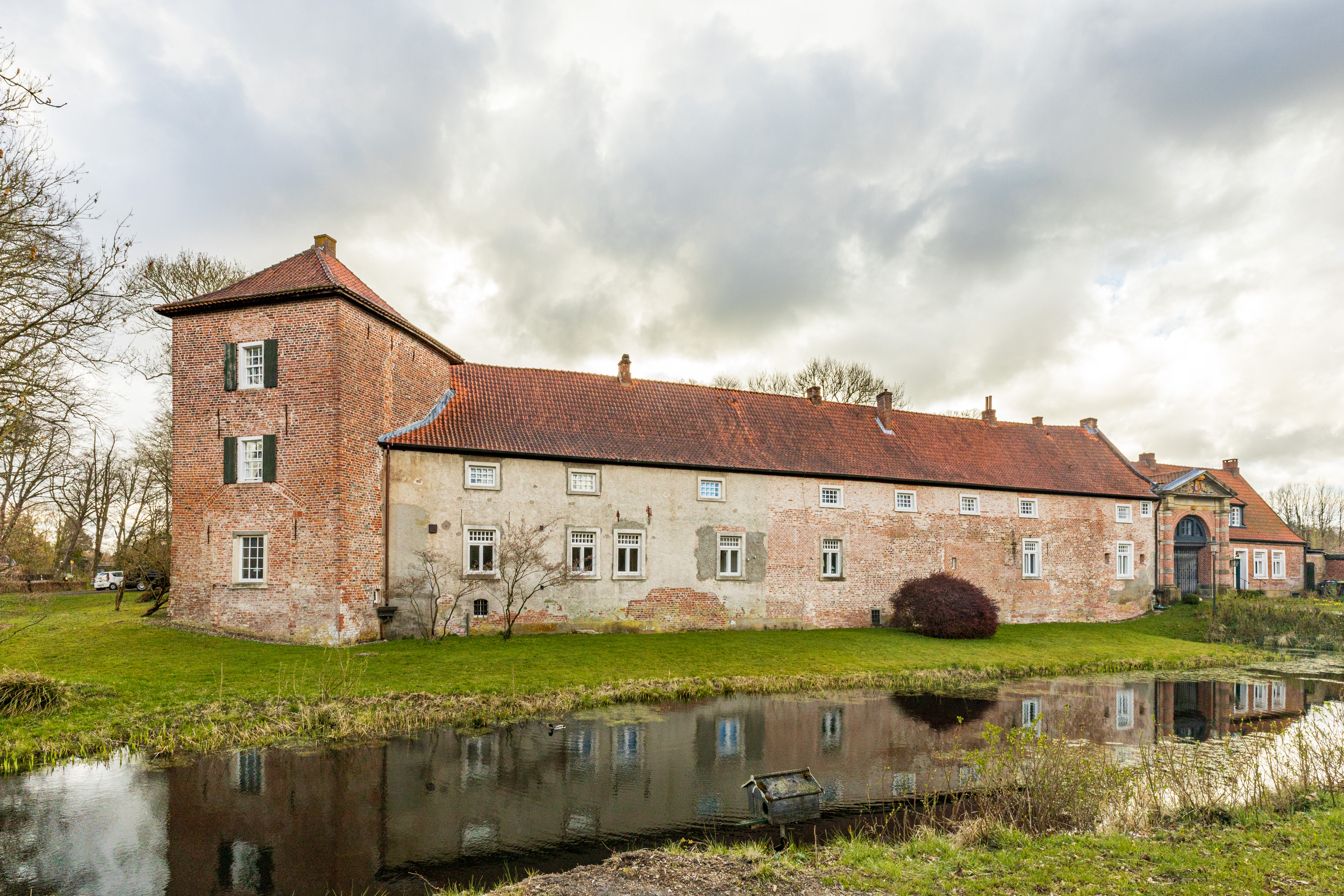
- Berum Castle

Site information
- Type: Moated castle in a village
- Open to the public: No
- Condition: Largely demolished

Location
- Shown within Lower Saxony, Germany
- Coordinates: 53.6014°N 07.2973°E

Site history
- Built: c. 1310
- Demolished: 1764

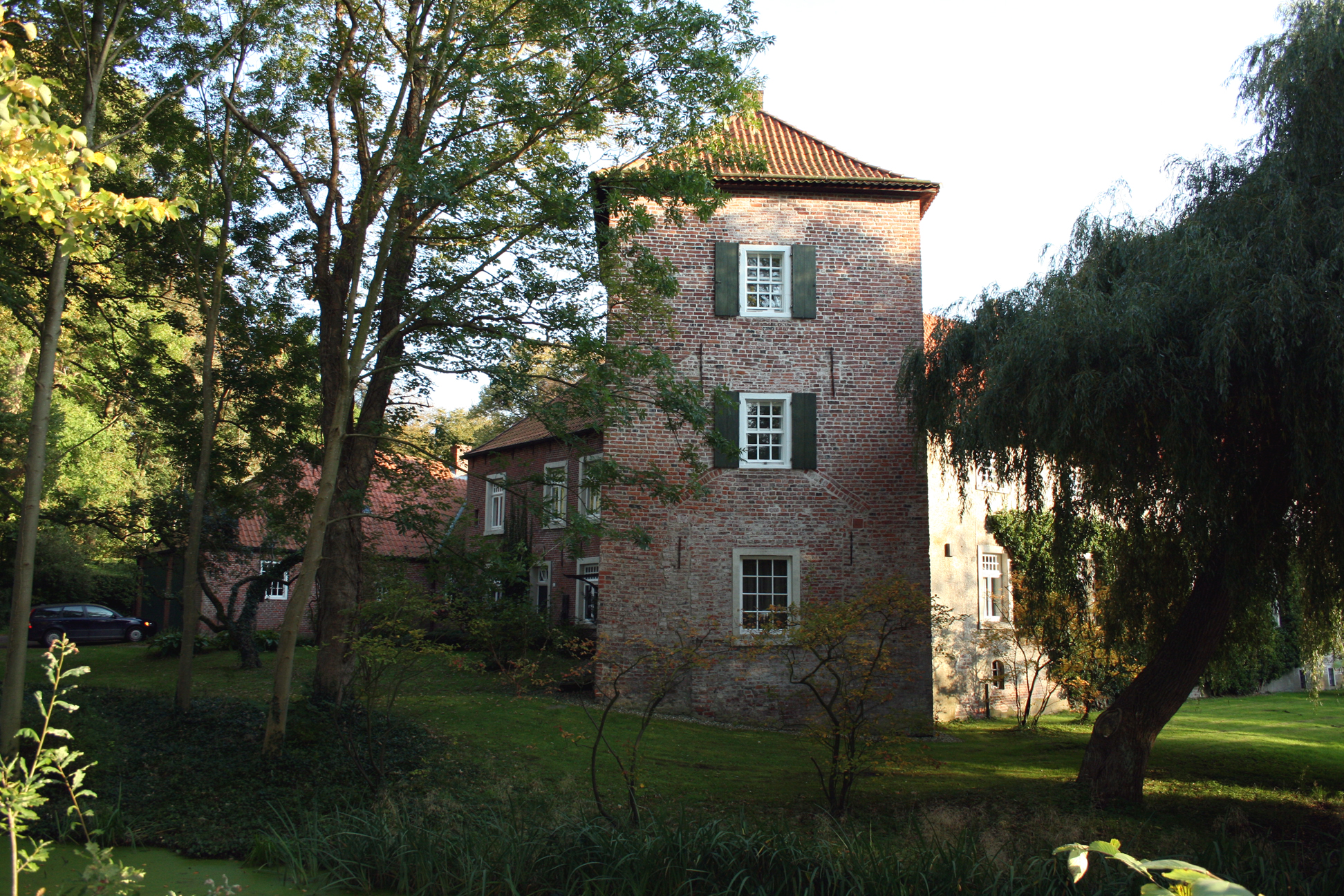
Tower of Berum Castle in 2007, as seen from the street

Berum Castle is located in the Berum district the East Frisian town of Hage in Germany. It is one of the most important sites in East Frisian history.

== History ==
The castle is first mentioned in a document of 1310, as the seat of a member of the Syrtza (or Sytze) family, who was a chieftain of the Norden area. It is not known exactly when the castle was built, or for how long that family had already resided at the location.

In the 15th century, the castle was inherited by the Cirksena family. In 1443, Count Ulrich I of East Frisia expanded the castle to a château, consisting of a main castle with three wings, plus a front castle. On 1 June 1445, he celebrated his marriage to Theda Ukena, the granddaughter of his main rival, Focko Ukena, in Berum Castle. Since then, the castle has played a significant rôle in the history of East Frisia.

Adolph, the son of Count Gerhard VI of Oldenburg, was held captive at Berum Castle from 1465 to 1481 after Oldenburg invaded East Frisia.

In the late 16th century, Count Edzard II extended the castle further as a moated castle in Renaissance style. This extension was completed in 1591 with the construction of a spire. After Edzard's death, his widow, Catherine Vasa of Sweden, a daughter of King Gustav I of Sweden extended the castle further, adding (among other extensions) a chapel. From then on, the castle was used by the Cirksena family as the widow's residence.

On 28 January 1600, the Treaty of Berum was signed at the castle. Under this treaty, East Frisia purchased the Lordships of Esens, Stedesdorf and Wittmund from the County of Rietberg.

On 17 April 1628, Berum Castle was the scene of a tragic accident. The imperial army under general Matthias Gallas had been quartered in the castle. The 26-year-old Count Rudolpf Christian got embroiled in a fight with a lieutenant of the imperial army. He was stung in his left eye and died of his wound.

Under Christine Charlotte, who lived there from 1690 to 1699 as the widow of Prince George Christian, the castle was again renovated, making Berum one of the most magnificent princely palaces in Germany.

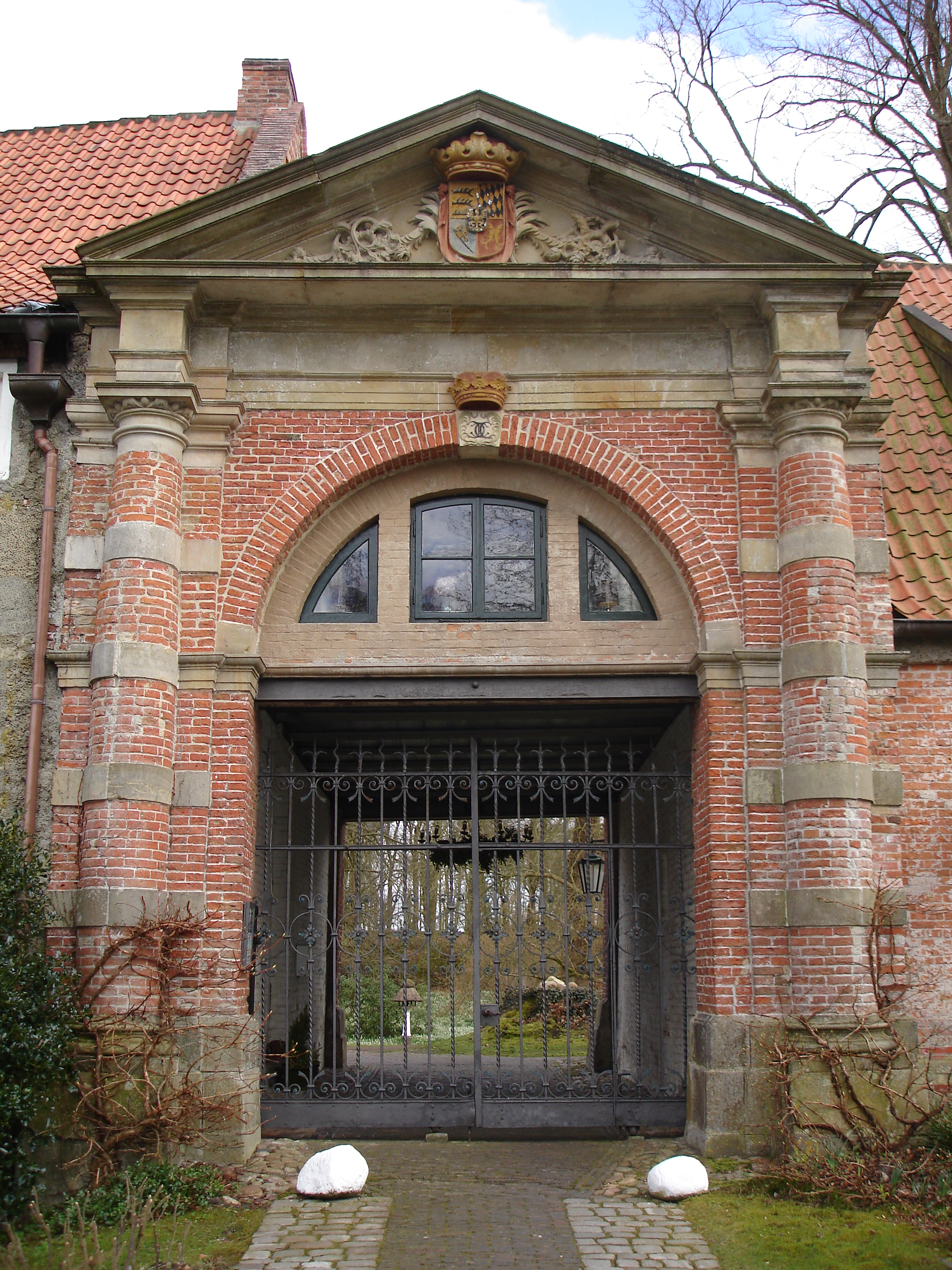
Baroque gatehouse

After Prussia took over East Frisia in 1744, there was no more use for a widow's residence and the castle fell into disrepair. The main castle was demolished in 1764, with its precious furniture sold off. Until 1764, Berum Castle had had four wings and a heavy rectangular tower on the northwest corner. It was protected by a massive wall and a double ring moat. The parts remaining today are the front castle, a long brick building attached to the defensive wall with a brick gate tower, and the former Baroque gate passage. This portal is flanked by two columns; the pediments show the coat of arms of Princess Christine Charlotte. The exterior wall and the outer moat still exist. In the south are the remains of the Baroque garden of 1712.

Today the facility is privately owned and serves as a guesthouse. For example, Federal President Horst Köhler spent his summer vacation in 2006 at Berum Castle.
