= Hage =

- Municipality
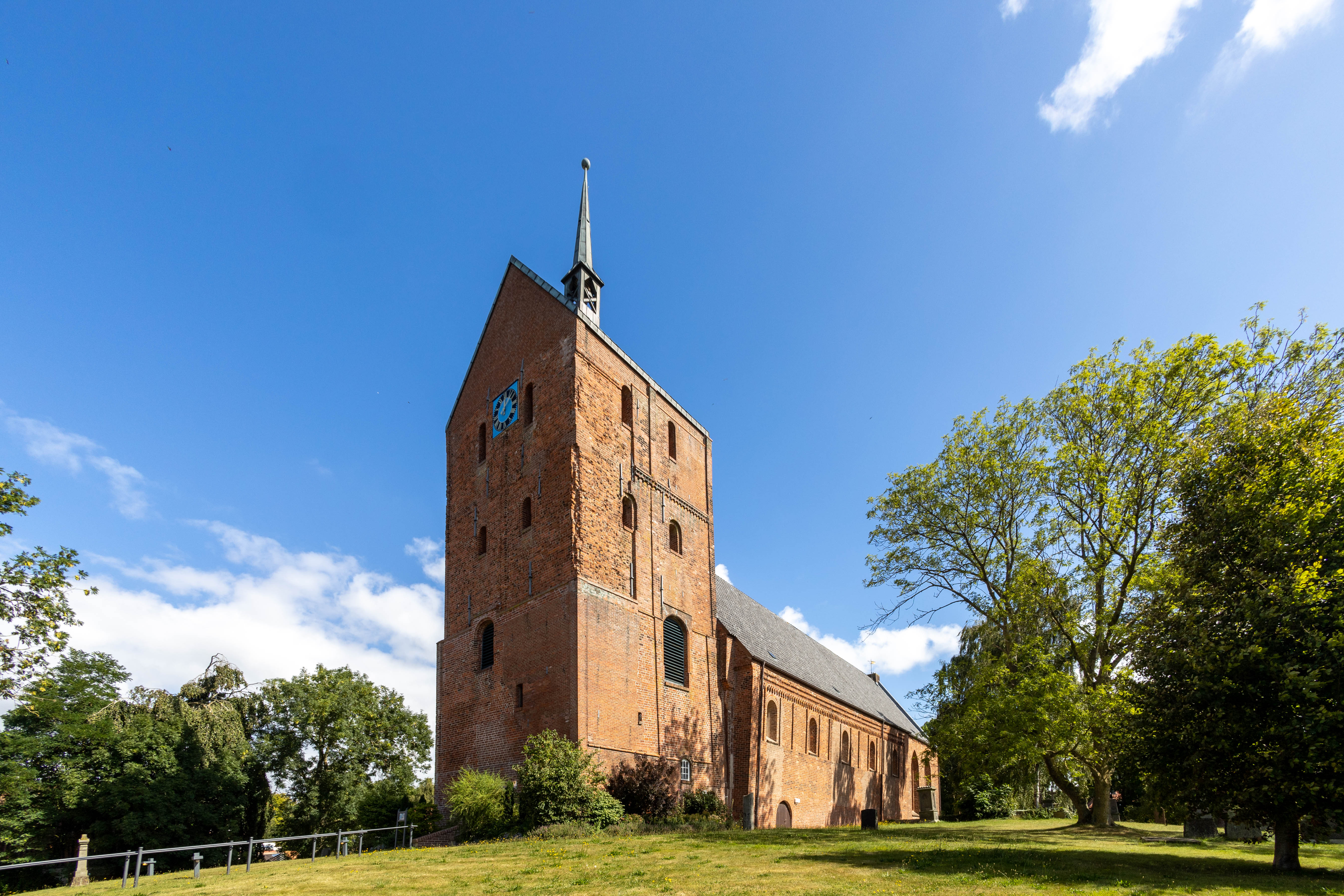
- St. Ansgari Church

- Flag Coat of arms

- Location of Hage within Aurich district
- Interactive map of Hage
- Location within Germany Location within Lower Saxony
- Coordinates: 53°36′N 7°17′E
- Country: Germany
- State: Lower Saxony
- District: Aurich
- Municipal assoc.: Hage

Government
  - Mayor: Erwin Sell (SPD)

Area
  - Total: 16.62 km^{2} (6.42 sq mi)
- Elevation: 1 m (3.3 ft)

Population (2025-12-31)
  - Total: 6,531
  - Density: 393.0/km^{2} (1,018/sq mi)
- Time zone: UTC+01:00 (CET)
  - Summer (DST): UTC+02:00 (CEST)
- Postal codes: 26524
- Dialling codes: 0 49 31
- Vehicle registration: AUR
- Website: www.hage-nordsee.de

Hage (East Frisian: Haag) is a small East Frisian town (Flecken) in Lower Saxony, Germany. Located in the district of Aurich close to the North Sea, approximately 5 km east of Norden, Hage has a population of 6,424 as of 31 December 2022. Hage is also the seat of the Samtgemeinde ("collective municipality") Hage.

To the municipality of Hage belong the villages (Ortsteile) of Berum, Blandorf, Hagerwilde, and Wichte. The former is the site of Berum Castle, which played an important role in East Frisian history.

== Gallery ==
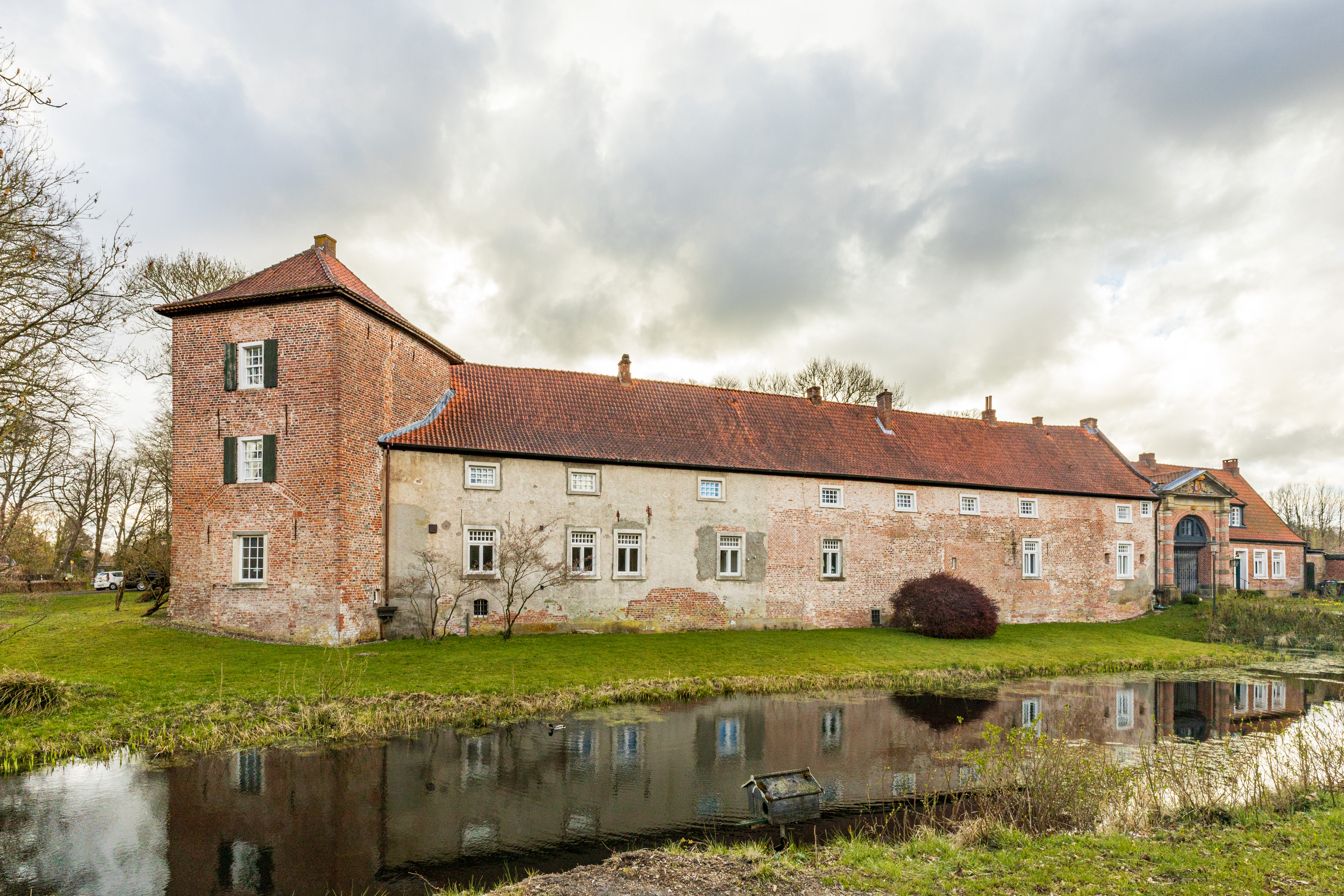
Burg Berum

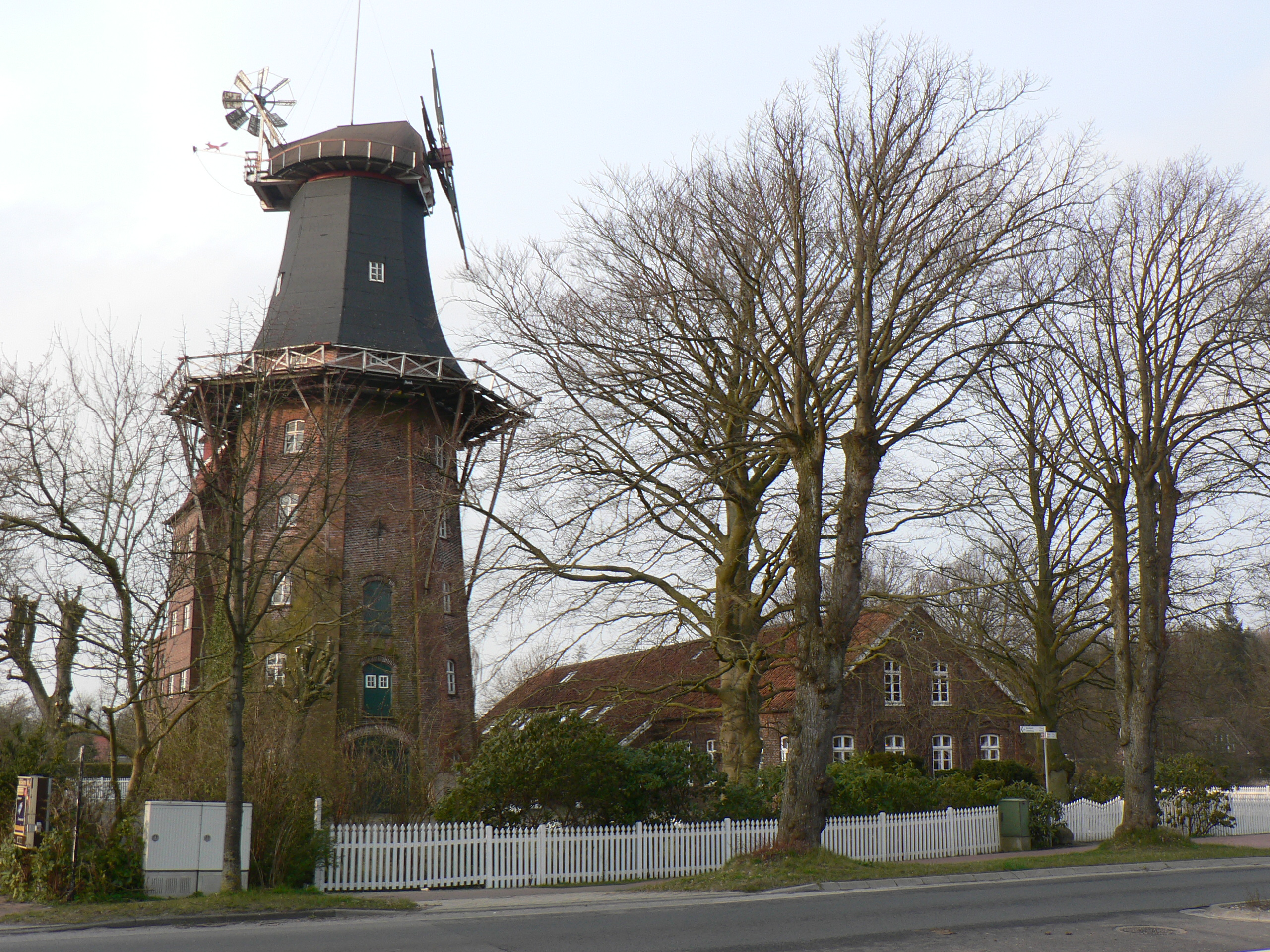
Windmill

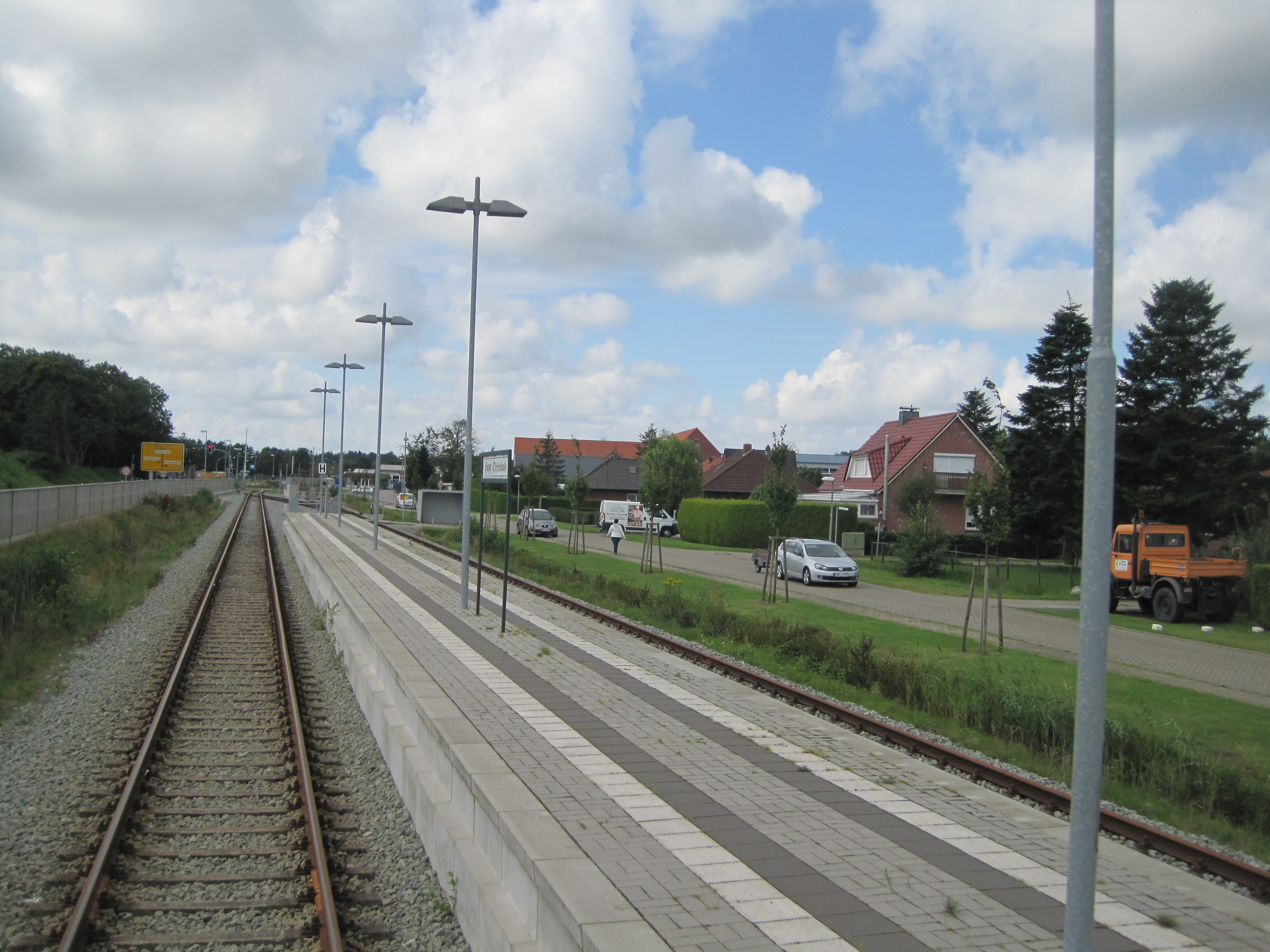
Hage railway station

== Notable people ==
- Johan Rudolph Deiman (1743–1808), physician and chemist
- Hans-Werner Fischer-Elfert (born 1954), Egyptologist
- Rudolf Ströbinger (1931–2005), journalist and writer
