= Hage (Samtgemeinde) =

- Samtgemeinde
- Location of Hage within Aurich district
- Interactive map of Hage
- Location within Germany Location within Lower Saxony
- Coordinates: 53°36′N 7°17′E
- Country: Germany
- State: Lower Saxony
- District: Aurich
- Seat: Hage
- Subdivisions: 5 municipalities

Area
  - Total: 68.63 km^{2} (26.50 sq mi)

Population (2025-12-31)
  - Total: 11,366
  - Density: 165.6/km^{2} (428.9/sq mi)
- Time zone: UTC+01:00 (CET)
  - Summer (DST): UTC+02:00 (CEST)
- Website: www.sg-hage.de

Hage is a Samtgemeinde ("collective municipality") in the district of Aurich, in Lower Saxony, Germany. Its seat is in the municipality Hage.

The Samtgemeinde Hage consists of the following municipalities:

1. Berumbur
2. Hage
3. Hagermarsch
4. Halbemond
5. Lütetsburg
