= Vickers Vulcan =

Vickers airliner

Vulcan
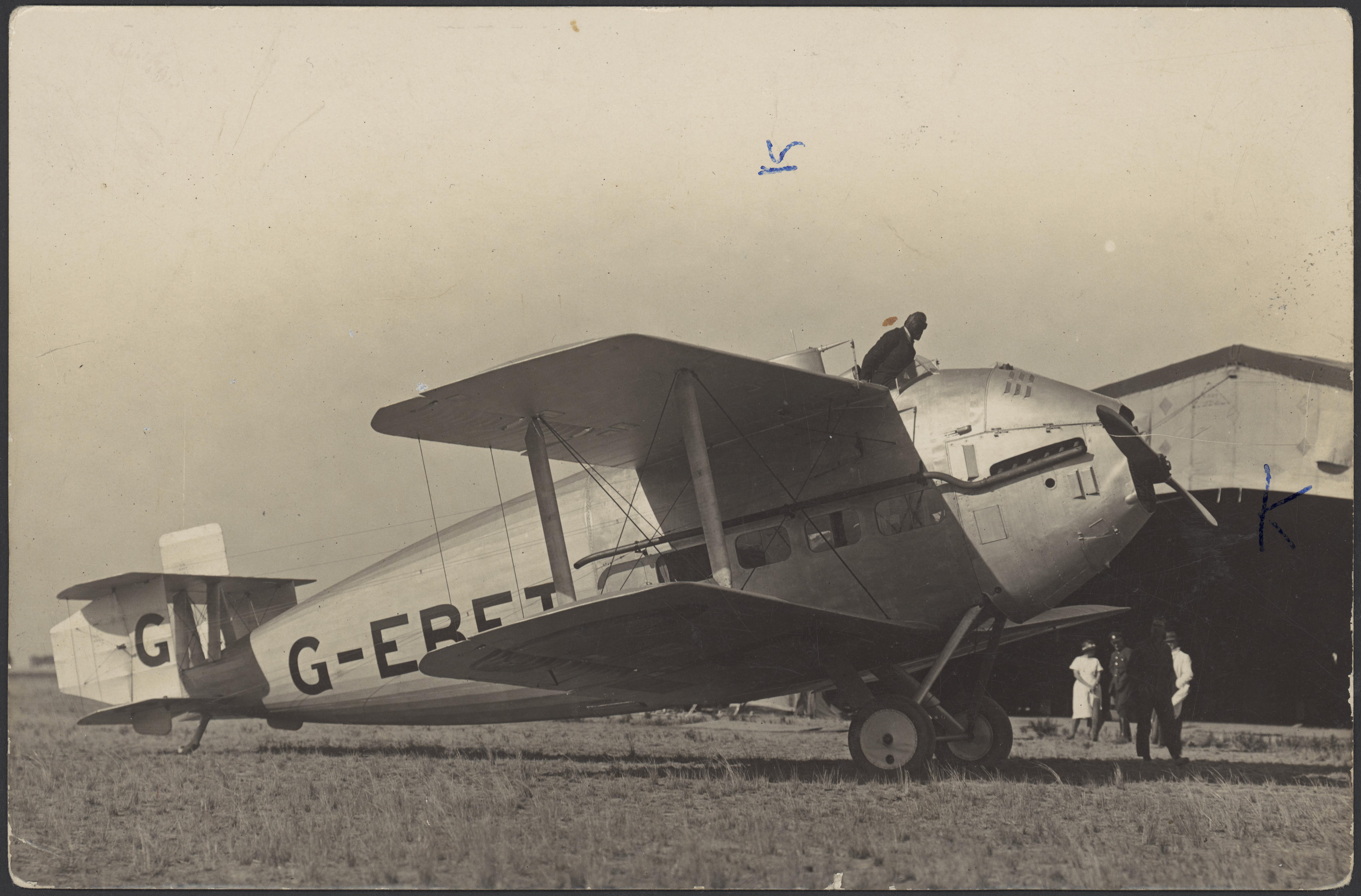
- Vickers Vulcan Type 61

General information
- Type: Airliner
- Manufacturer: Vickers
- Designer: Rex Pierson
- Primary users: Instone Air Line Imperial Airways
- Number built: 8

History
- Manufactured: 1922–1925
- Introduction date: 1 June 1922
- First flight: April 1922
- Retired: July 1928

The Vickers Vulcan was a British single-engine biplane airliner of the 1920s built by Vickers Limited at Brooklands Aerodrome, Surrey. It carried eight passengers and a pilot.

== Development ==
The Vickers Vulcan was designed by Rex Pierson of Vickers. It first flew in April 1922 at the hands of chief test pilot, S. Cockerell, at Brooklands Aerodrome in Surrey, UK.

The Vulcan was based on a civil version of the Vimy bomber, but featured many changes, including a much larger, taller fuselage and one, instead of two, Rolls-Royce Eagle VIII engines, the intention being low operating costs. The shape of its fuselage, as well as its flying characteristics, earned it the nickname "Flying Pig". The first delivery took place in August 1922, to Instone Air Line Ltd. Other operators included Imperial Airways and Qantas (however, the latter returned the aircraft as their performance was too poor for the company's needs). The last Vulcan flying was a Type 74 with Imperial Airways. It crashed in July 1928 while on a test flight from Croydon Airport.

== Variants ==
- Type 61 - first production version, five built.
- Type 63 - cargo version based on the Type 61, one built
- Type 68 - proposed colonial variant with an Eagle VIII engine, not built.
- Type 74 - upgraded to 450 hp Napier Lion engine, two built
- Type 86 - proposed all-metal variant with an Eagle VIII engine, not built.

== Operators ==
Australia

- Qantas

United Kingdom

- Imperial Airways
- Instone Air Line

== Accidents and incidents ==
- G-EBEM (Type 61) Disappeared off the coast of Italy in May 1926.
- G-EBLB (Type 74) crashed during a test flight from Croydon Airport at Purley July 1928.

== Specifications (Vulcan Type 74) ==
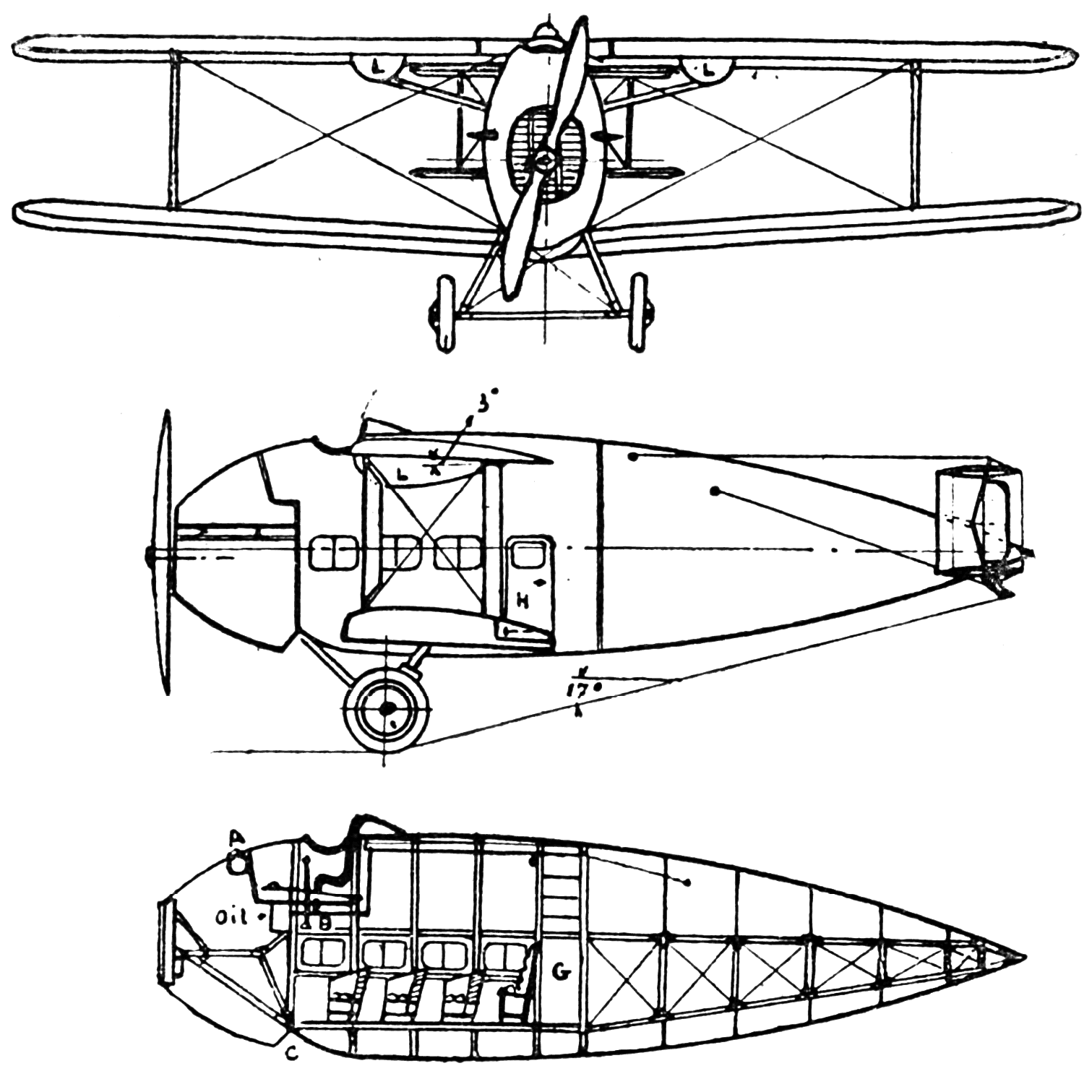
Vickers Vulcan 2-view drawing from L'Aéronautique March,1922

Data from Vickers Aircraft Since 1908

General characteristics

- Crew: 1
- Capacity: 6–8 passengers
- Length: 38 ft 0 in (11.58 m)
- Wingspan: 49 ft 0 in (14.94 m)
- Height: 14 ft 3 in (4.34 m)
- Wing area: 840 sq ft (78 m^{2})
- Empty weight: 4,400 lb (1,996 kg)
- Gross weight: 6,750 lb (3,062 kg)
- Powerplant: 1 × Napier Lion 12-cylinder water-cooled broad arrow piston engine, 450 hp (340 kW)

Performance

- Maximum speed: 112 mph (180 km/h, 97 kn) at sea level
- Range: 460 mi (740 km, 400 nmi)
- Service ceiling: 10,500 ft (3,200 m)
- Rate of climb: 500 ft/min (2.5 m/s)
- Time to altitude: 13 min to 5,000 ft (1,500 m)

== See also ==
Related development

- Vickers Vimy

Aircraft of comparable role, configuration, and era

- Bristol Ten-seater
- De Havilland DH.18
- De Havilland DH.34

== Sources ==
- Andrews, C.F and Morgan, E.B. Vickers Aircraft since 1908. London:Putnam, 1988. ISBN 0-85177-815-1.
- Elliott, Bryn (January–February 1999). "On the Beat: The First 60 Years of Britain's Air Police". Air Enthusiast (79): 68–75. ISSN 0143-5450.
