= Gotha G.IX =

German bomber biplane

G.VIII, GL.VIII, and G.IX
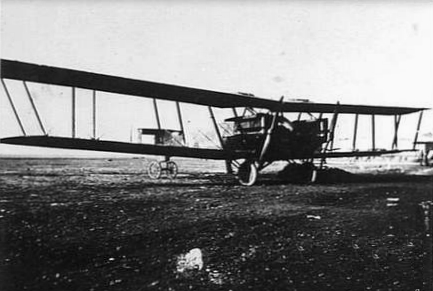

General information
- Type: Bomber
- National origin: Germany
- Manufacturer: Gothaer Waggonfabrik
- Primary users: Luftstreitkräfte Belgian Air Force
- Number built: c. 90 (mainly G.IX)

History
- First flight: 1918
- Developed from: Gotha G.VII

The Gotha G.VIII, GL.VIII, and G.IX were a family of bomber aircraft produced in Germany during the final months of World War I. Based on the Gotha G.VII, they were intended as high-speed tactical bombers featuring advanced streamlining for their day.

== G.VIII and G.IX ==
The G.VIII designation was applied to a single machine developed from the G.VII, with a wingspan extended to 21.73 m (71 ft 3 in) and a revised fuselage. A wing cellule was extended by adding an extra half-bay into it. While no further production ensued, the fuselage modifications were retained on the definitive G.IX. This latter design replaced the new half-bays in the wing cellule with full bays, now bringing the span to 25.26 m (82 ft 11 in). The Idflieg ordered 170 G.IXs from Luft Verkehrs Gesellschaft (LVG) to replace the Gotha G.Vs still in front-line service with Boghol 3. Probably around half of this number were completed before the end of the war, with at least some of them reaching operational status by that time. Following the war, captured examples served for a short time with the Belgian Air Force.

== GL.VIII ==
The GL.VIII was a lightweight version of the G.VIII with a compound tail assembly and auxiliary struts supporting the upper mainplane wing-tips.

== Specifications (G.IX) ==
General characteristics

- Crew: Three
- Length: 9.79 m (32 ft 1 in)
- Wingspan: 25.26 m (82 ft 11 in)
- Height: 3.54 m (11 ft 7 in)
- Powerplant: 2 × Maybach Mb IVa , 180 kW (245 hp) each

== See also ==
Related development

- Gotha G.V
- Gotha G.VII
- Gotha G.VIII
- Gotha G.X

Aircraft of comparable role, configuration, and era

- AEG G.V
- Airco D.H.10 Amiens
- Friedrichshafen G.IV
- Martin MB-1
- Vickers Vimy

Related lists

- List of military aircraft of Germany
- List of bomber aircraft
