= Gotha G.X =

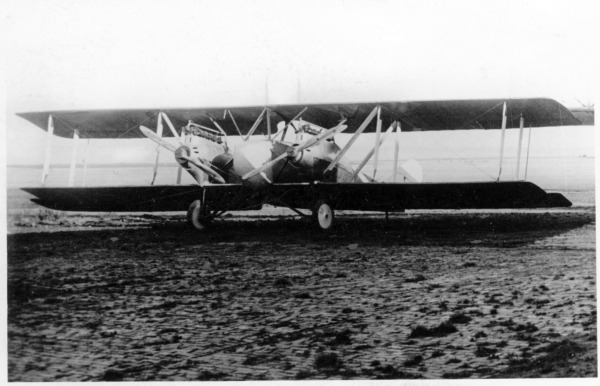

General information
- Type: Bomber
- National origin: Germany
- Designer: Hans Burkhard
- Number built: 2

History
- First flight: 1918

The Gotha G.X was an experimental bomber aircraft designed and built in Germany from 1917.

== Development ==
The Gotha G.X was an experimental bomber with a general arrangement similar to the Gotha G.V. This relatively small aircraft was powered by two 180 hp B.M.W. IIIa engines and had two-bay wings with auxiliary struts outboard of the engine nacelles.

== See also ==
Related development

- Gotha G.V
- Gotha G.VII
- Gotha G.VIII
- Gotha G.IX

Aircraft of comparable role, configuration, and era

- Airco D.H.10 Amiens
- Vickers Vimy

Related lists

- List of military aircraft of Germany
- List of bomber aircraft
- List of aircraft
