= Gotha G.V =

Heavy bomber aircraft

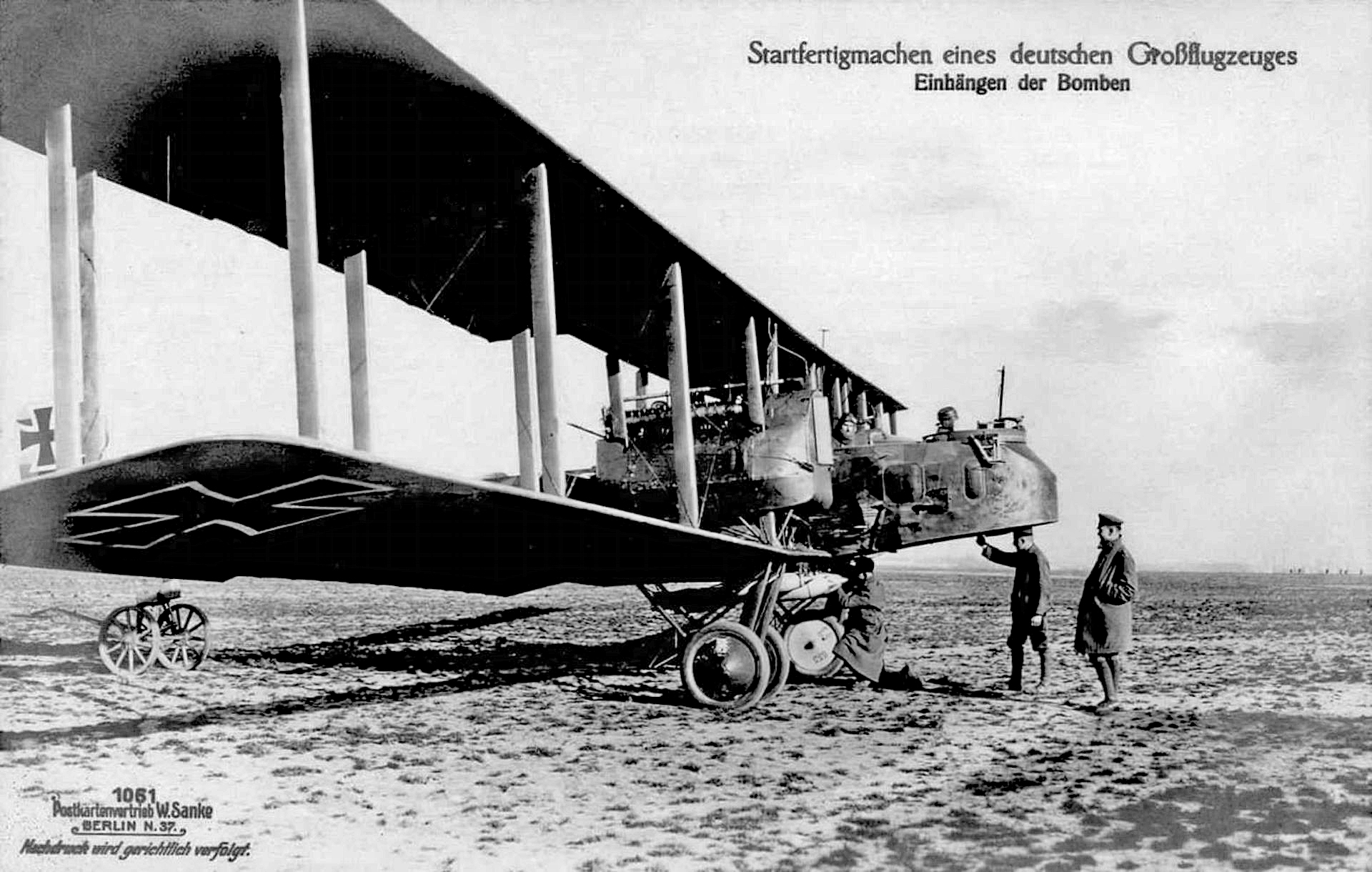

General information
- Type: Heavy bomber
- National origin: German Empire
- Manufacturer: Gothaer Waggonfabrik AG
- Designer: Hans Burkhard
- Primary user: Luftstreitkräfte
- Number built: 205

History
- Manufactured: 1917–1918
- Introduction date: August 1917
- First flight: 1917
- Developed from: Gotha G.IV
- Developed into: Gotha G.VI; Gotha G.VII

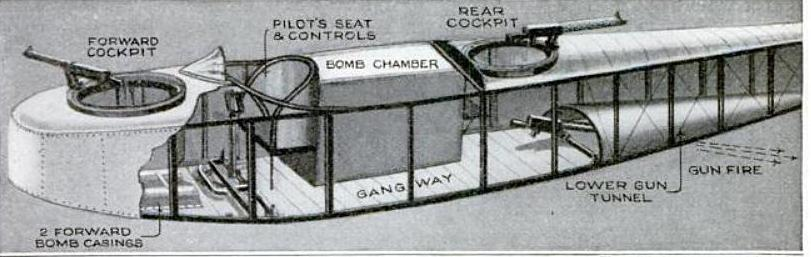
Internal fuselage arrangement of Burkhard's G.II through G.IV bomber designs. In G.Vs the Gotha tunnel was expanded, the bomb bay and the gangway were replaced with a fuel tank.

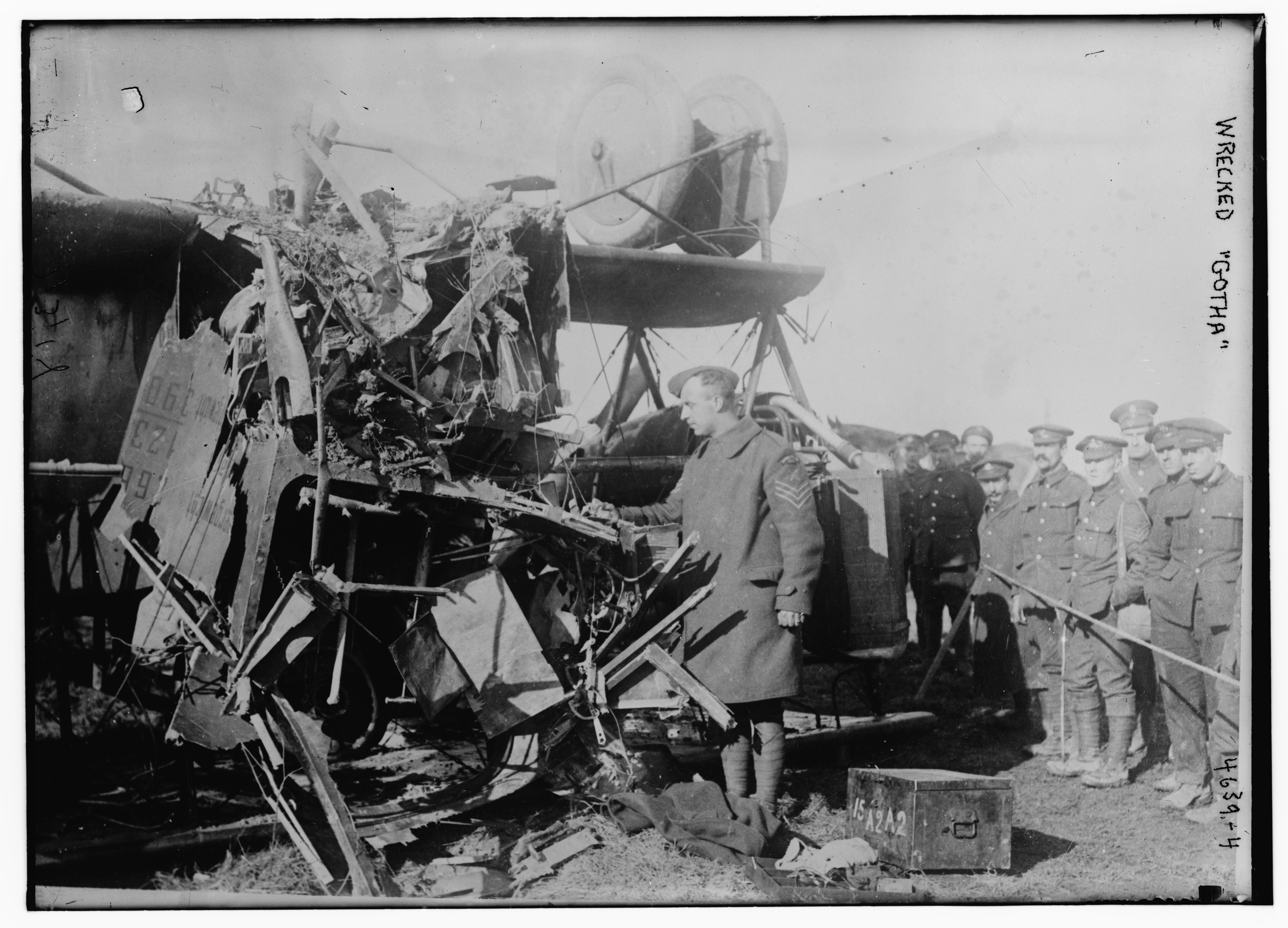
Allied forces servicemen inspecting a wrecked "Gotha" bomber, 1917 or 1918

The Gotha G.V was a heavy bomber used by the Luftstreitkräfte (Imperial German Air Service) during World War I. Designed for long-range service and built by Gothaer Waggonfabrik AG, the Gotha G.V was used principally as a night bomber.

== Development ==
Operational use of the Gotha G.IV demonstrated that the incorporation of the fuel tanks into the engine nacelles was a mistake. In a crash landing the tanks could rupture and spill fuel onto the hot engines. This posed a serious problem because landing accidents caused 75% of operational losses. In response Gothaer produced the G.V, which housed its fuel tanks inside the fuselage. The smaller engine nacelles were mounted on struts above the lower wing.

The Gotha G.V pilot seat was offset to port, with the fuel tanks immediately behind. This blocked the connecting walkway that previously on earlier machines allowed crew members to move between the three gun stations. All bombs were carried externally in this model.

The base variant of G.V offered no performance improvement over the G.IV. The G.V was up to 450 kg (990 lb) heavier than the G.IV due to additional equipment and the use of insufficiently seasoned timber. The Mercedes D.IVa engines could not produce the rated 190 kW (260 hp) due to inferior quality of fuel.

=== Gotha tunnel ===
The Gotha included an important innovation in the form of a "gun tunnel", whereby the underside of the rear fuselage was arched, early versions allowing placement of a rearward-facing machine gun, protecting against attack from below, removing the blind spot. Later versions expanded the tunnel to remove the lower gun, providing a slot in the upper fuselage that allowed the rear gunner to remain stationary.

== Operational history ==
The G.V entered service in August 1917. For the performance reasons aforementioned, it generally could not operate at altitudes as high as the G.IV.

== Variants ==
=== G.Va ===
In February 1918, Gothaer tested a compound tail unit with biplane horizontal stabilizers and twin rudders. The new tail unit, known as the Kastensteuerung, improved the aircraft's marginal directional control on one engine. The resulting G.Va subvariant incorporated the new tail, as well as a slightly shorter forward fuselage with an auxiliary nose landing gear. All 25 G.Va aircraft were delivered to Bogohl 3, the new designation for the former Kagohl 3.

=== G.Vb ===
Carried an increased payload compared to the earlier G.Va, and operated at a maximum takeoff weight of 4,550 kg (10,030 lb). To reduce the danger of flipping over during landing, Gothaer introduced the Stossfahrgestell ("shock landing gear"), a tandem two-bogie main landing gear. The Stossfahrgestell proved so good that it was fitted to all G.Vs in Bogohl 3. Some G.Vb aircraft also had Flettner servo tabs on the ailerons to reduce control forces.

Idflieg ordered 80 G.Vb aircraft, the first being delivered to Bogohl 3 in June 1918. By the Armistice, all 80 aircraft were built but the last batch did not reach the front and was delivered direct to the Allied special commission.

== Operators ==
German Empire

- Luftstreitkräfte

== Specifications (Gotha G.V) ==
Data from Die Deutschen Militärflugzeuge 1910-1918

General characteristics

- Crew: 3 (sometimes 4)
- Length: 12.36 m (40 ft 7 in)
- Wingspan: 23.7 m (77 ft 9 in)
- Height: 4.3 m (14 ft 1 in)
- Wing area: 89.5 m^{2} (963 sq ft)
- Empty weight: 2,740 kg (6,041 lb)
- Gross weight: 3,975 kg (8,763 lb)
- Powerplant: 2 × Mercedes D.IVa 6-cylinder water-cooled in-line piston engines, 190 kW (260 hp) each
- Propellers: wooden fixed-pitch pusher propellers

Performance

- Maximum speed: 140 km/h (87 mph, 76 kn)
- Range: 840 km (520 mi, 450 nmi)
- Service ceiling: 6,500 m (21,300 ft)

Armament

- Guns: 2 or 3 × 7.92 mm (.312 in) Parabellum MG 14 machine guns
- Bombs: 14 × 25 kg (60 lb.) bombs

== See also ==
- German strategic bombing during World War I
- Riesenflugzeuge, larger World War I bombers
- Sikorsky Ilya Muromets

Related development

- Gotha G.II
- Gotha G.III
- Gotha G.IV
- Gotha G.VI
- Gotha G.VII
- Gotha G.VIII
- Gotha G.IX
- Gotha G.X

Aircraft of comparable role, configuration, and era

- AEG G.III, AEG G.IV, AEG G.V
- Friedrichshafen G.II, G.III, G.IV & G.V
- Handley Page Type O
- Martin MB-1
- Vickers Vimy

Related lists

- List of military aircraft of Germany
- List of bomber aircraft

== Bibliography ==
- Hallade, Jean (December 1977). "Quand les Gothas bombardaient Paris..." [When the Gothas Bombed Paris...]. Le Fana de l'Aviation (in French) (97): 28–30. ISSN 0757-4169.
- Herris, Jack (2013). Gotha Aircraft of WWI: A Centennial Perspective on Great War Airplanes. Great War Aviation Centennial Series. Vol. 6. Aeronaut Books. ISBN 978-1-935881-14-8.
- Metzmacher, Andreas (2021). Gotha Aircraft 1913-1954: From the London Bomber to the Flying Wing Jet Fighter. Fonthill. ISBN 978-1-78155-706-8.
