= Gotha G.VII =

German WWI bomber aircraft model

G.VII
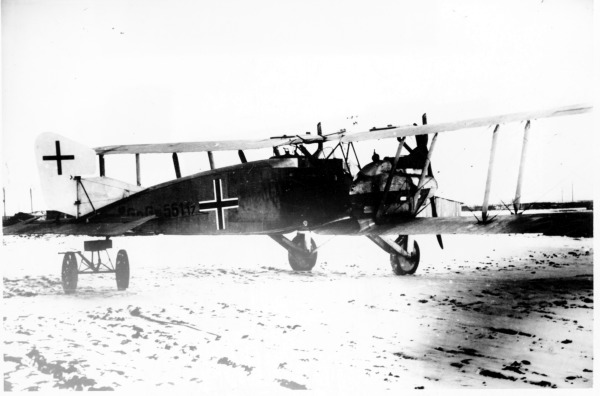

General information
- Type: Bomber
- National origin: Germany
- Manufacturer: Gotha
- Primary users: Luftstreitkräfte Ukrainian Air Force, Czechoslovak Air Force
- Number built: c. 20

History
- First flight: 1918
- Developed from: Gotha G.V
- Developed into: Gotha G.VIII

The Gotha G.VII was a bomber aircraft produced in Germany during the final months of World War I. With the strategic bombing campaign effectively over, it was intended to be a high-speed tactical bomber with a secondary reconnaissance capability.

== Design and development ==
The G.VII was a conventional two-bay biplane design with tractor-mounted engines, and a conventional empennage with twin fins and rudders. The bombardier's position in the nose of the aircraft that had featured on earlier Gotha designs was removed, and the nose of the aircraft severely truncated and fitted with a streamlined nose-cone. This allowed the engines to be located further inboard than on previous designs, bringing them closer to the aircraft's centreline and therefore minimising the effects of asymmetric thrust in the event of an engine failure. The engine nacelles also featured careful streamlining.

The Idflieg ordered around 250 of these aircraft, 50 from Gotha and 50 from LVG, and 150 from Aviatik. At least some of the LVG and Aviatik machines had been completed before the Armistice, with some reaching operational service. One G.VII survived the war to see brief service with the Ukrainian Air Force before being impounded by Czechoslovakia and used by the Czechoslovak Air Force for a short time.

== Variants ==
- Gotha G.VII prototype - The original prototype with short nosed fuselage was intended for long-range photographic reconnaissance.

== Operators ==
Austria-Hungary

- Austro-Hungarian Imperial and Royal Aviation Troops

Czechoslovakia

- Czechoslovak Air Force (one aircraft taken from Ukrainian Air Force)

Germany

- Luftstreitkrafte

Ukraine

- Ukrainian Air Force (one aircraft)

== Specifications (Gotha G.VII production) ==
Data from Gray & Thetford, “German Aircraft of the First World War”

General characteristics

- Crew: 3
- Length: 9.63 m (31 ft 7.1 in)
- Wingspan: 19.27 m (63 ft 2.7 in)
- Height: 3.51 m (11 ft 6 in)
- Wing area: 63.8 m^{2} (689 sq ft)
- Empty weight: 2,419 kg (5,333 lb)
- Gross weight: 3,139 kg (6,920 lb)
- Powerplant: 2 × Mercedes D.IVa , 194 kW (260 hp) each

Performance

- Maximum speed: 180 km/h (110 mph, 97 kn)
- Range: 540 km (340 mi, 300 nmi)
- Endurance: 3 hours
- Service ceiling: 7,000 m (23,000 ft)
- Rate of climb: 2.6 m/s (510 ft/min)

Armament

- 1 × 7.92 mm (.312 in) Parabellum machine gun in dorsal ring mount

== See also ==
Related development

- Gotha G.V
- Gotha G.VI
- Gotha G.VIII
- Gotha G.VIII
- Gotha G.IX
- Gotha G.X

Aircraft of comparable role, configuration, and era

- AEG G.V
- Airco D.H.10 Amiens
- Friedrichshafen G.IV
- Martin MB-1
- Vickers Vimy
