= Mercedes D.IVa =

I-6 piston aircraft engine

D.IVa
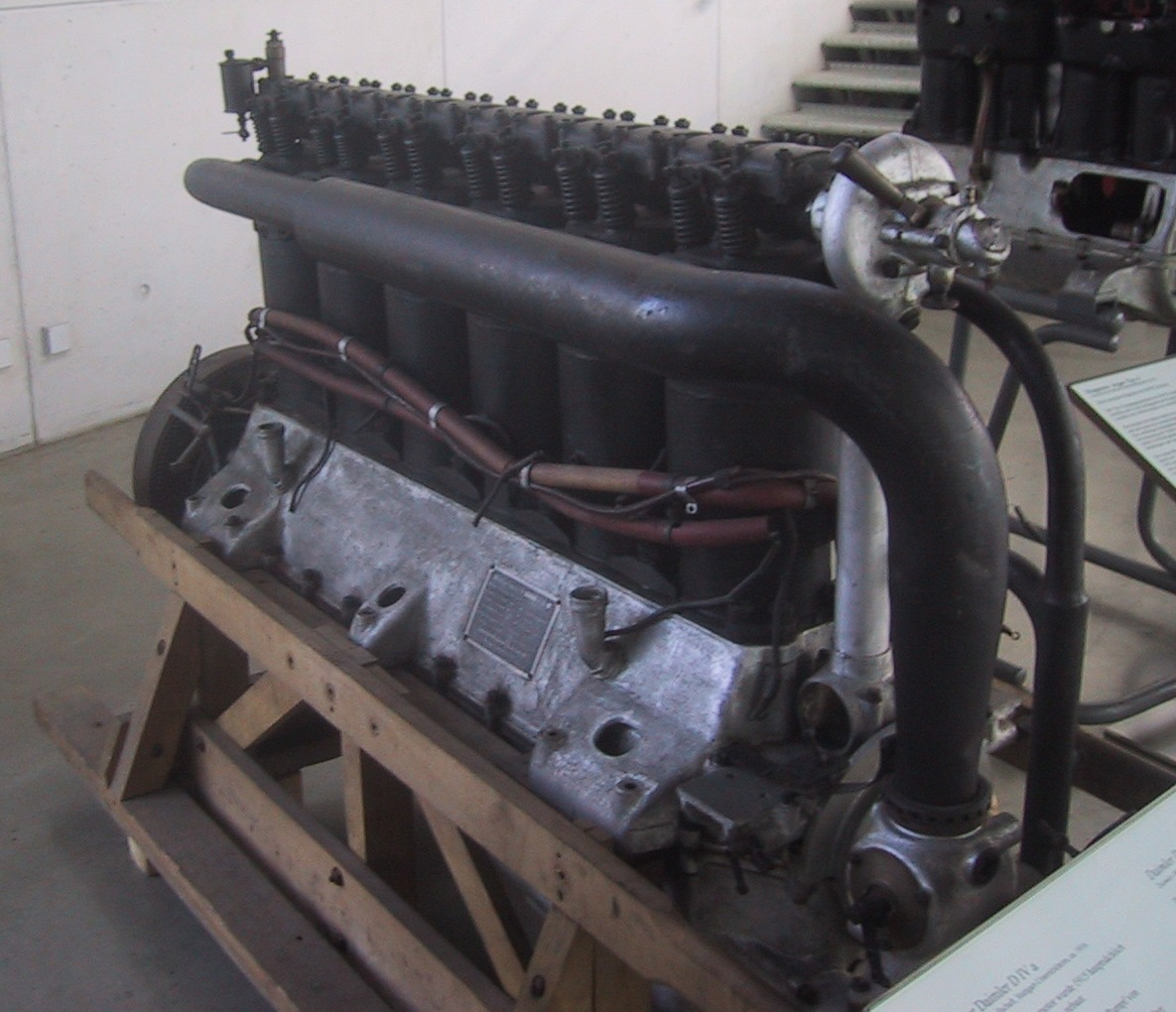
- Mercedes D.IVa at the Deutsches Museum. The prominent black piping is the inlet manifold from the carburetor
- Type: Inline piston engine
- Manufacturer: Daimler Motoren Gesellschaft (DMG)
- First run: 1917

The Mercedes D.IVa was a German six-cylinder, water-cooled, inline engine developed in 1917 for use in aircraft and built by Daimler Motoren Gesellschaft (DMG).

== Design and development ==
The D.IVa replaced the failed Mercedes D.IV inline eight-cylinder engine. The D.IVa was primarily used to power bombers and large reconnaissance aircraft. Unlike most German designs, the D.IVa was relatively advanced, including four valves per cylinder actuated by a SOHC valvetrain, the same "single-camshaft" arrangement that had also been used on the earlier two-valve per cylinder D.I through D.IIIa powerplants.

Designed specifically to be installed in the fuselage, the engine featured a number of design elements intended to reduce its width. For instance, the carburetor was placed behind the engine, feeding fuel to the cylinders via a long tubular intake manifold. This had the disadvantage of poor fuel distribution. Two versions of the engine were produced in mirror copies, running in opposite directions.

== Applications ==
- AEG G.IV
- AEG G.V
- AEG R.I
- AGO C.VIII
- Albatros C.X
- Albatros C.XII
- Albatros C.XV
- Friedrichshafen G.III
- Friedrichshafen G.IV
- Friedrichshafen N.I
- Gotha G.III
- Gotha G.IV
- Gotha G.V
- Gotha G.VI
- Gotha G.VII
- Linke-Hofmann R.I
- Linke-Hofmann R.II
- Rumpler C.IV
- Zeppelin Staaken R.VI

== Engines on display ==
- A Mercedes D.IVa recently restored by the Museum's Friends ASSN. is on public display at the Museo Nacional de Aeronautica (MORON-Argentina).

== Specifications (D.IVa) ==
Data from Jane's all the World's Aircraft 1918, Jane's Fighting Aircraft of World War One

=== General characteristics ===
- Type: 6-cylinder, inline piston engine
- Bore: 160 mm (6.30 in)
- Stroke: 180 mm (7.09 in)
- Displacement: 21.72 L (1,325 cu in)
- Length: 1,168.4 mm (46 in) approx.
- Height: 1,968.5 mm (77.5 in)
- Dry weight: 498.50 kg (1,099 lb)

=== Components ===
- Valvetrain: Shaft driven SOHC operating twin exhaust and inlet valves with a half compression setting for starting
- Fuel system: Twin jet Mercedes carburettor with automatic mixture control
- Fuel type: Gasoline
- Oil system: Forced feed to bearings and camshaft
- Cooling system: Water-cooled
- Reduction gear: Direct drive, left-hand tractor

=== Performance ===
- Power output: 188 kW (252 hp) at 1,400 rpm
- Compression ratio: 4.94:1
- Fuel consumption: 71 L (125 imp pt) per hour
- Specific fuel consumption: 0.329 kg/kWh (0.541 lb/(hp⋅h)) / 0.461 L/kWh (0.605 imp pt/(hp⋅h))
- Oil consumption: 0.024 L/kWh (0.032 imp pt/(hp⋅h))
- Power-to-weight ratio: 0.376 kW/kg (0.229 hp/lb)
- Bmep: 741 kPa (107.5 psi)

== See also ==
Related lists

- List of aircraft engines
