= Gotha G.VI =

German experimental bomber plane from WW I

General information
- Type: Bomber
- National origin: Germany
- Designer: Hans Burkhard
- Number built: 2

History
- First flight: 1918
- Developed from: Gotha G.V

The Gotha G.VI was an experimental bomber aircraft designed and built in Germany during World War I.

== Development ==
The Gotha G.VI was an experimental bomber developed from the Gotha G.V. Using the standard wing cellule from the Gotha G.V, the G.VI became what was probably the first asymmetrical aircraft to be built. In an effort to reduce drag, Hans Burkhard, the chief designer at Gotha, studied various configurations of fuselage and engine nacelle for multi-engined aircraft. He concluded that drag could be reduced dramatically if the number of bodies creating drag could be reduced, on September 22, 1915, Burkhard obtained German Patent number 300 676 for his unusual design.

Using the wing from a Gotha G.V Burkhard moved an engine to the front of the fuselage, driving a tractor propeller, and moved it to lie over the port main undercarriage supports. The second engine was moved to the rear of a nacelle, driving a pusher propeller, offset to a lesser degree to starboard, to compensate for differing drag characteristics, the forward end of the nacelle housed a cockpit for a gunner armed with a flexible machine-gun that extended forward of the tractor propeller in the port fuselage.

Flight tests commenced in the summer of 1918, with the only major problem being buffeting of the tail unit, but were interrupted when the aircraft nosed over, repairs were not carried out to the first prototype. The buffeting of the tail unit was to have been alleviated by fitting an asymmetric tailplane, offset to port, on the second prototype which was not completed before the Armistice. The second prototype is reputed to have been destroyed before it could be requisitioned by the Military Inter-Allied Commission of Control.

== Specifications (Gotha G.VI) ==
Data from The Osprey Encyclopaedia of Russian Aircraft 1875 – 1995

General characteristics

- Crew: 3/4
- Length: 12.4 m (40 ft 8.25 in)
- Wingspan: 23.7 m (77 ft 9.25 in)
- Wing area: 89.5 m^{2} (967 sq ft)
- Powerplant: 2 × Mercedes D IVa , 194 kW (260 hp) each

Performance

== See also ==
Related development

- Gotha G.II
- Gotha G.III
- Gotha G.IV
- Gotha G.V
- Gotha G.VII

Aircraft of comparable role, configuration, and era

- AEG G.V
- Airco D.H.10 Amiens
- Friedrichshafen G.III, G.IV & G.V
- Martin MB-1
- Vickers Vimy

Related lists

- List of aircraft

== Bibliography ==
- Gray, Peter; Thetford, Owen (1962). "Gotha G VI". German Aircraft of the First World War (1st ed.). London: Putnam. p. 415. ISBN 0-370-00103-6. LCCN 63025508.
- Herris, Jack (2013). Gotha Aircraft of WWI: A Centennial Perspective on Great War Airplanes. Great War Aviation Centennial Series. Vol. 6. Charleston, South Carolina: Aeronaut Books. ISBN 978-1-935881-14-8.
- Metzmacher, Andreas (2021). Gotha Aircraft 1913-1954: From the London Bomber to the Flying Wing Jet Fighter. Brimscombe, Stroud: Fonthill. ISBN 978-1-78155-706-8.
- Taylor, Michael J.H. Jane's Encyclopedia of Aviation. Studio Editions. London. 1989. ISBN 0-517-69186-8
