= AEG R.I =

R.I
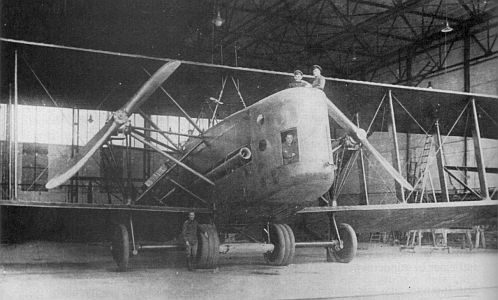

General information
- Type: Bomber
- National origin: Germany
- Manufacturer: AEG
- Primary user: Luftstreitkräfte
- Number built: 1 completed and 7 more partially built

History
- First flight: 14 June 1918

The AEG R.I was a prototype biplane heavy bomber (Riesenflugzeug) aircraft built by the Allgemeine Elektricitäts-Gesellschaft (AEG) during the First World War for the Imperial German Army's (Deutsches Heer) Imperial German Air Service (Luftstreitkräfte). It made its first flight in mid-1918 and only one of the eight aircraft ordered was completed. That aircraft disintegrated in flight with the loss of all aboard shortly before the end of the war in November. The incomplete aircraft were scrapped.

== Design and development ==
AEG received an order in late 1916 from the Inspectorate of Flying Troops (Inspektion der Fliegertruppen (Idflieg) for a pair of heavy bombers in its (Riesenflugzeug) program. These were four-engined aircraft with the engines located inside the fuselage to allow in-flight maintenance. The R.I's 260-horsepower (190 kW) Mercedes D.IVa straight-six engines drove the propellers via a complex system of gearboxes and driveshafts so that any engine could power any propeller. The propellers were mounted in nacelles between the wings that contained their gearboxes. The engines were initially equipped with individual radiators mounted on the sides of the fuselage, but these were replaced by four radiators mounted on the rear central struts. The engines were grouped together in an engine room immediately behind the nose observer's compartment in the nose. The fuselage was built in AEG's normal manner from cable-braced steel tubing. From the nose to the end of the engine compartment the fuselage was covered in plywood, but doped fabric was used over the rest. The three-bay wings were built from a pair of steel tube spars with duraluminium ribs.

The R.I made its first flight on 14 June 1918. Initial flights demonstrated that the aircraft was tail-heavy and that the engine cooling and rudder area were insufficient, but modifications were quickly made and the flight testing resumed. On 3 September 1918, a newly assembled propeller, which had not been given sufficient time for glue to cure, disintegrated, which allowed its driveshaft to damage the fuselage which caused the R.I to break up, killing all seven crew on board. Of the seven further AEG R.1 aircraft planned or under production when the war ended, only one aircraft was even partially complete. All were subsequently scrapped.

== Specifications ==
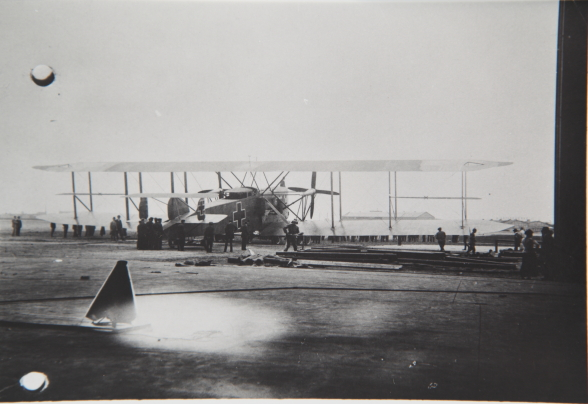
AEG R.I from rear

Data from The German Giants: The German R-Planes 1914–1918; A.E.G. Aircraft of WWI: A Centennial Perspective on Great War Airplanes

General characteristics

- Crew: 7
- Length: 19.5 m (64 ft 0 in)
- Wingspan: 36 m (118 ft 1 in)
- Height: 6.35 m (20 ft 10 in)
- Wing area: 260 m^{2} (2,800 sq ft)
- Empty weight: 9,000 kg (19,842 lb)
- Gross weight: 12,700 kg (27,999 lb)
- Fuel capacity: 2,750 L (600 imp gal; 730 US gal)
- Powerplant: 4 × Mercedes D.IVa water-cooled straight-six piston engines, 190 kW (260 hp) each
- Propellers: 2-bladed, 5.2 m (17 ft 1 in) diameter

Armament

- Guns: 5 × 7.92 mm (.312 in) machine guns

== See also ==
Related lists

- List of military aircraft of Germany
- List of bomber aircraft

== Bibliography ==
- Haddow, G.W.; Grosz, Peter M. (1988). The German Giants: The German R-Planes 1914-1918 (3rd ed.). London: Putnam. ISBN 0-85177-812-7.
- Herris, Jack (2015). A.E.G. Aircraft of WWI: A Centennial Perspective on Great War Airplanes. Great War Aviation Centennial Series. Vol. 16. n. p.: Aeronaut Books. ISBN 978-1-935881-28-5.
