= 1928 Imperial Airways Vickers Vulcan crash =

1928 test flight crash

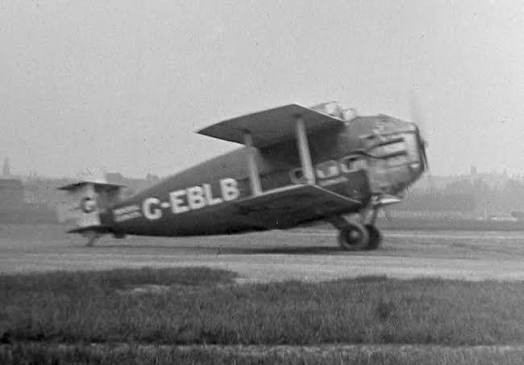
- G-EBLB, the Vickers Vulcan involved in the accident.

Accident
- Date: 13 July 1928
- Site: near Purley, Surrey; 51°19′56″N 0°07′05″W

Aircraft
- Aircraft type: Vickers Vulcan
- Operator: Imperial Airways
- Registration: G-EBLB
- Flight origin: Croydon Airport, England
- Destination: Croydon Airport, England
- Occupants: 6
- Passengers: 5
- Crew: 1
- Fatalities: 4
- Survivors: 2

The 1928 Imperial Airways Vickers Vulcan crash occurred on 13 July 1928 when a Vickers Vulcan on a test flight from Croydon Airport with a pilot and five passengers crashed near Purley, Surrey three miles from the airport, with the loss of four passengers. As a result of the crash Imperial Airways stopped the flying of staff (so called joy rides) on test flights.

== Aircraft ==
The aircraft involved was a Vickers Vulcan registered G-EBLB, an eight-passenger single-engined biplane airliner. It had been delivered to Imperial Airways in May 1925 and was the last of nine built. The machine was known as "The Flying Pig" by locals around the airport due to its appearance. Originally used for freight, the aircraft had been refitted to enable it to carry eight passengers.

== Accident ==
The aircraft which was not in regular service but was used for special flights and carrying surplus baggage and freight had the engine changed on 12 July and departed Croydon at midday on 13 July on a flight to test the new engine. The opportunity was taken to take some members of staff on a flight along with a government aeronautical inspection department (AID) inspector. Although the aircraft needed to be passed fit by an AID inspector the presence of the inspector on the flight was not related to that approval. After the aircraft had climbed to 800 feet it disappeared from view of the airport in a south-west direction. The aircraft crashed into a market garden near Leigh Cottage on Woodcote Road, it was seen by residents flying low over the roof tops with the engine "evidently in difficulties".

The aircraft crashed into a potato field, the pilot in an open cockpit clambered clear and helped one of the passengers from the enclosed cabin free. The aircraft burst into flames and it was not possible to rescue the other passengers. The four passengers (two male and two female) were killed. Later evidence indicated that at least one had died due to the impact and the others were unconscious when the fire started.

== Inquest ==
An inquest was opened at Brandon Hill near Croydon on 16 July 1928 and after identification of the four passengers was adjourned. The inquest resumed on 30 July 1928 and it was explained to the inquest by an employee of Imperial Airways that it was not unusual for passengers to be taken on test flight and those on board had permission. The coroner questioned the wisdom of allowing passengers on what could be a dangerous test flight and was told all the passengers had signed indemnity documents. The employee in charge of the two girls on the flight said they had asked her for permission and it was allowed as long as it was not for more than 15 minutes. An engineering superintendent said employees were keen to take "Joy Rides" but agreed that it was sometimes "a bother". The passenger who survived the accident told the inquest that staff thought of it as a privilege to go on a joy ride and he would do it again.

The pilot Captain John Spafford gave his evidence to the inquest, he had been informed at 11:50 that the aircraft needed an engine test and he was to also take five passengers and some ballast. Spafford calculated that his weight would be under the full load and that on the ground the engine sounded normal.

"When I was about 700 feet I pushed the nose down to maintain height and noticed that the aircraft began to sink rapidly. I increased the throttle to little effect and then started to look for a safe landing place, but the area was full of high trees and houses. I increased the throttle and was able to hold height for a few minutes and then noticed the engine water temperature was over 100 degrees Celsius and I could see steam from the left hand engine cowling. The engine lost power again and I saw a chance to land in some allotments, I pushed the control down to 45 degrees and hit the ground at the same angle. I was trapped by my foot and released myself after about two minutes, as I freed myself the engine caught fire. I managed to get to the door of the cabin and only one of the passengers was conscious."

Spafford agreed with the coroner that the presence of passengers were not required for an engine test. After further questioning of the pilot the jury returned a verdict of accidental death in all four cases. The coroner added that the practice of allowing employees of the airline to go as passengers on test flight should stop. The engineering superintendent from Imperial Airways said that the airline would discontinue the practice.
