= Vickers Vimy =

British early heavy bomber aircraft

Vimy
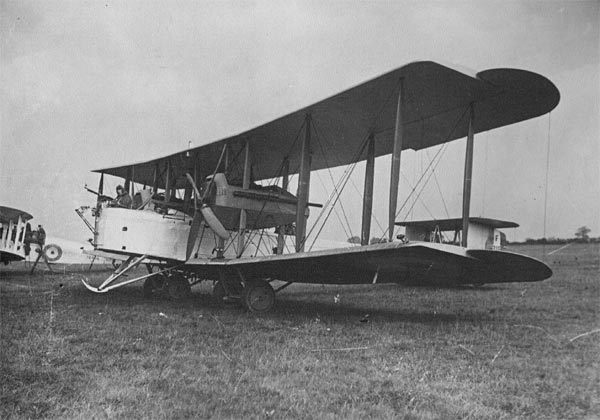

General information
- Type: Heavy bomber
- Manufacturer: Vickers Limited
- Designer: Rex Pierson
- Primary user: Royal Air Force

History
- Introduction date: 1919
- First flight: 30 November 1917
- Retired: 1933
- Variants: Vickers Vernon; Vickers Virginia

The Vickers Vimy is a British heavy bomber aircraft developed and manufactured by Vickers Limited. Developed during the latter stages of the First World War to equip the Royal Flying Corps (RFC), the Vimy was designed by Rex Pierson, Vickers' chief designer.

Only a handful of Vickers Vimy aircraft had entered service by the time the Armistice of 11 November 1918 came into effect, so the type did not serve in active combat operations during the war, but the Vimy became the core of the Royal Air Force (RAF)'s heavy bomber force throughout the 1920s. The Vimy achieved success as both a military and a civil aircraft, the latter using the Vimy Commercial variant. A dedicated transport derivative of the Vimy, the Vickers Vernon, became the first troop-transport aircraft operated by the RAF.

During the interwar period the Vimy set several records for long-distance flights, the most celebrated and significant of these being the first non-stop crossing of the Atlantic Ocean, performed by John Alcock and Arthur Brown in June 1919. Other record-breaking flights were made from the United Kingdom to destinations such as South Africa and Australia. The Vimy continued to be operated until the 1930s in military and civil capacities.

== Design and development ==
=== Background ===
Throughout the First World War both the Allied Powers and the Central Powers made increasingly sophisticated use of new technologies in their attempts to break through the effective stalemate of trench warfare. One key advance made during the conflict was in the use of fixed-wing aircraft, which were at that time rapidly advancing in capability, for combat purposes. On 23 July 1917, in response to a bombing raid by German bombers on London, the Air Board, having determined that existing projects were not ambitious enough, decided to cancel all orders for experimental heavy bombers then underway. A week later, following protests from the Controller of the Technical Department, the Air Board placed an order for 100 Handley Page O/100 bombers, which was accompanied by orders for prototype heavy bombers being placed with Handley Page and Vickers Limited. On 16 August 1917 Vickers was issued with a contract for three prototype aircraft and Rex Pierson, chief designer of Vickers' aviation division, started designing a large twin-engine biplane bomber, to be powered by either a pair of RAF 4d or 200 hp (150 kW) Hispano Suiza engines. Pierson discussed the proposed aircraft with Major J. C. Buchanan of the Air Board to establish the rough configuration of the aircraft, which was expected to meet the requirement for a night bomber which could attack targets within the German Empire.

=== Design ===
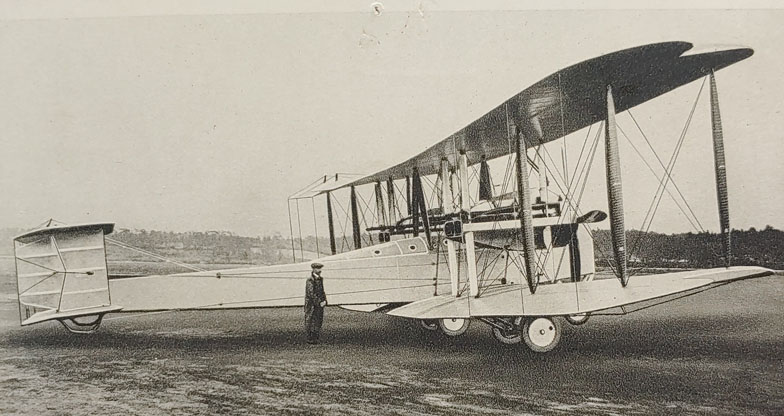
Vickers F.B.27 Vimy side view

The Vickers F.B.27 Vimy is an equal-span twin-engine four-bay biplane, with balanced ailerons on both upper and lower wings. The engine nacelles were positioned mid-gap and contained the fuel tanks. It has a biplane empennage with elevators on upper and lower surfaces and twin rudders. The main undercarriage consists of two pairs of wheels, each pair carried on a pair of tubular steel V-struts. There is a tail-skid and an additional skid mounted below the nose of the fuselage to prevent nose-overs.

The aircraft was designed to accommodate a three-man crew and a payload of 12 bombs. In addition to the pilot's cockpit, which was positioned just ahead of the wings, there were two positions for gunners, one behind the wings and the other in the nose, each with a pair of Scarff ring-mounted Lewis guns; the rear cockpit mounting was commonly not fitted during the interwar period. Provision for a maximum of four spare drums of ammunition were present in the nose position, while up to six drums could be carried in the rear position.

The majority of the Vimy's payload of 250 lb (110 kg) bombs were stowed vertically inside the fuselage between the spars of the lower centre section; a typical load consisted of 12 bombs. In some variants further bombs could be stowed externally for a total of 18 bombs, if the particular engine used provided enough power. For anti-surface warfare in the maritime environment, the Vimy could also be armed with a pair of torpedoes. To improve bombing accuracy, the Vimy was equipped with the High Altitude Drift Mk.1a bombsight. Standard equipment also included two Michelin-built Mk.1 flare carriers.

The Vimy was powered by a range of different engines. Owing to engine supply difficulties, the prototype Vimys were tested with a number of different engine types, including Sunbeam Maoris, Salmson 9Zm water-cooled radials, and Fiat A.12bis engines, before production orders were placed for aircraft powered by the 230 hp (170 kW) BHP Puma, 400 hp (300 kW) Fiat, 400 hp (300 kW) Liberty L-12 and the 300 hp (270 kW) Rolls-Royce Eagle VIII engines, with a total of 776 ordered before the end of the First World War. Of these, only aircraft powered by the Eagle engine, known as the Vimy IV, were delivered to the RAF. Due to the number of engine types used there are multiple conflicting official reports on the production numbers of each sub-variant of the Vimy.

Design and production of the prototypes was extremely rapid; the detailed design phase of what had become internally designated as the Vickers F.B.27 and the manufacture of the three prototypes was completed within four months.

=== Prototypes ===
By the time the first prototype had been completed the RAF 4D was not sufficiently developed, so it was fitted with the alternative Hispano Suiza engine. On 30 November 1917 the first prototype, flown by Captain Gordon Bell, made its maiden flight from Royal Flying Corps Station Joyce Green, Kent. In January 1918 the first prototype was dispatched to RAF Martlesham Heath, Suffolk, for the official trials of the type. Reportedly, the F.B.27 quickly made a positive impression: it was able to take off with a greater payload than the Handley Page O/400 despite having about half the effective engine power. The engines proved to be unreliable during these trials, leading to the aircraft's return to Joyce Green on 12 April 1918.

The first prototype was extensively modified, receiving new Salmson water-cooled aero-engines in place of the Hispano Suizas; other changes included the adoption of an alternative exhaust stack configuration, a 3-degree dihedral on the mainplanes, and a modified tail unit. Following these modifications, the prototype was used for several years, surviving the war and being allocated a civil registration. In August 1919 the prototype was flown from Brooklands to Amsterdam in the Netherlands as part of Vicker's exhibit at the Eerste Luchtverkeer Tentoonstelling Amsterdam.

During early 1918 the second prototype was completed. Unlike the first, it had plain elevators and ailerons which had an inverse taper; the tops of the wings and tailplanes also differed. The defensive armament was increased, giving the rear gunner two separate guns; these changes would be standardised on production aircraft. The second prototype was powered by a pair of Sunbeam Maori engines, which were found to have an unreliable cooling system during initial testing at Joyce Green. On 26 April 1918 the aircraft was dispatched to RAF Martlesham Heath for official tests, but testing was interrupted by its loss in a crash following an engine failure.

During the first half of 1918 the third prototype was also completed. It was powered by a pair of 400 hp (300 kW) Fiat A.12 engines, and had a redesigned nose section and nacelles which were similar to production aircraft. On 15 August 1918 the third prototype was sent to RAF Martlesham Heath for performance tests; testing was delayed by the need to replace a cracked propeller. On 11 September 1918 it was lost when its payload of bombs detonated owing to a hard landing, the result of a pilot-induced stall.

It was decided to construct a fourth prototype to test the Rolls-Royce Eagle VIII engine. On 11 October 1918 this was flown from Joyce Green to Martlesham Heath to conduct official trials. Aside from being powered by the Eagle engine, it was identical to the earlier prototypes except for having a greatly increased fuel capacity and reshaped and enlarged rudders. By the time the fourth prototype commenced flying trials, mass production of the Vimy had already begun.

=== Production ===
Since the performance of the first prototype was satisfactory it was decided to start production before the evaluation of either of the other prototypes. On 26 March 1918 the first production contract, for 150 aircraft, was issued; these were built at Vickers' works in Crayford in the Bexley. Production of the type by additional manufacturers was envisaged early on; in May 1918 follow-up contracts were issued to Clayton & Shuttleworth, Morgan & Co, and the Royal Aircraft Establishment (RAE), in addition to a separate production line at Vickers' Weybridge complex. At one point over 1,000 aircraft had been ordered under wartime contracts. The type had received the official name of Vimy, after the Battle of Vimy Ridge.

By the end of 1918 a total of 13 aircraft had been completed by Vickers; 7 at Crayford and 6 at Weybridge. Production continued after the signing of the Armistice of 11 November 1918, which led to Vickers ultimately completing 112 aircraft under wartime contracts. The majority, if not all, of Vimys ordered from Morgan & Co were completed, while Westland Aircraft manufactured 25 of the 75 units that they were contracted for. The numbers produced by the RAE are obscured by changes in serial number allocation and the apparent adoption of a piecemeal approach to manufacturing, which came into effect shortly after the end of the war; in February 1920, the RAE completed their final Vimy.

Production aircraft used several different types of engines, leading to various mark numbers being applied to the Vimy to distinguish between the emerging subtypes. The use of different engines was often because of availability; relatively few engines from Rolls-Royce Limited were used in the Vimy during 1918 owing to low output levels from that manufacturer, while other manufacturers also struggled to keep up with engine demand that year. At one point, there was considerable enthusiasm for powering the Vimy with American Liberty L-12 engines, because of their plentiful supply at the time, but all orders for the Liberty-equipped Vimy were terminated in January 1919 and no examples were ever completed. The BHP Puma was also intended for use on the Vimy, but it was cancelled without any aircraft being fitted with the engine.

Use of the Vimy extended beyond its original use as a bomber. A model with greater internal space was developed, known as the Vimy Commercial within the civil market. It saw service with the RAF; known as the Vickers Vernon, it became the first dedicated troop transport to be operated by the service. The Vimy was also used as an air ambulance for transporting wounded troops to medical facilities, while some examples were configured to perform record-breaking long-distance flights. From 1923 to 1925 limited production batches of the Vimy were manufactured by Vickers. Between 1923 and 1931, at least another 43 early production aircraft were reconditioned to extend their service lives; at least one Vimy was reconditioned four times.

By October 1918 only three aircraft had been delivered to the Royal Air Force (RAF), one of which had been deployed to France for use by the Independent Air Force. It had been envisioned that the Vimy would be able to conduct long-range bombing missions into Germany, having the ability to reach Berlin from bases in France, but the Armistice of 11 November 1918 brought an end to the conflict before the Vimy could be used on any offensive operations. After the war, the RAF rapidly contracted in size, which slowed the introduction of the Vimy. The Vimy only reached full service status in July 1919 when it entered service with 58 Squadron in Egypt, replacing the older Handley Page 0/400.

== Operational history ==
=== RAF service ===
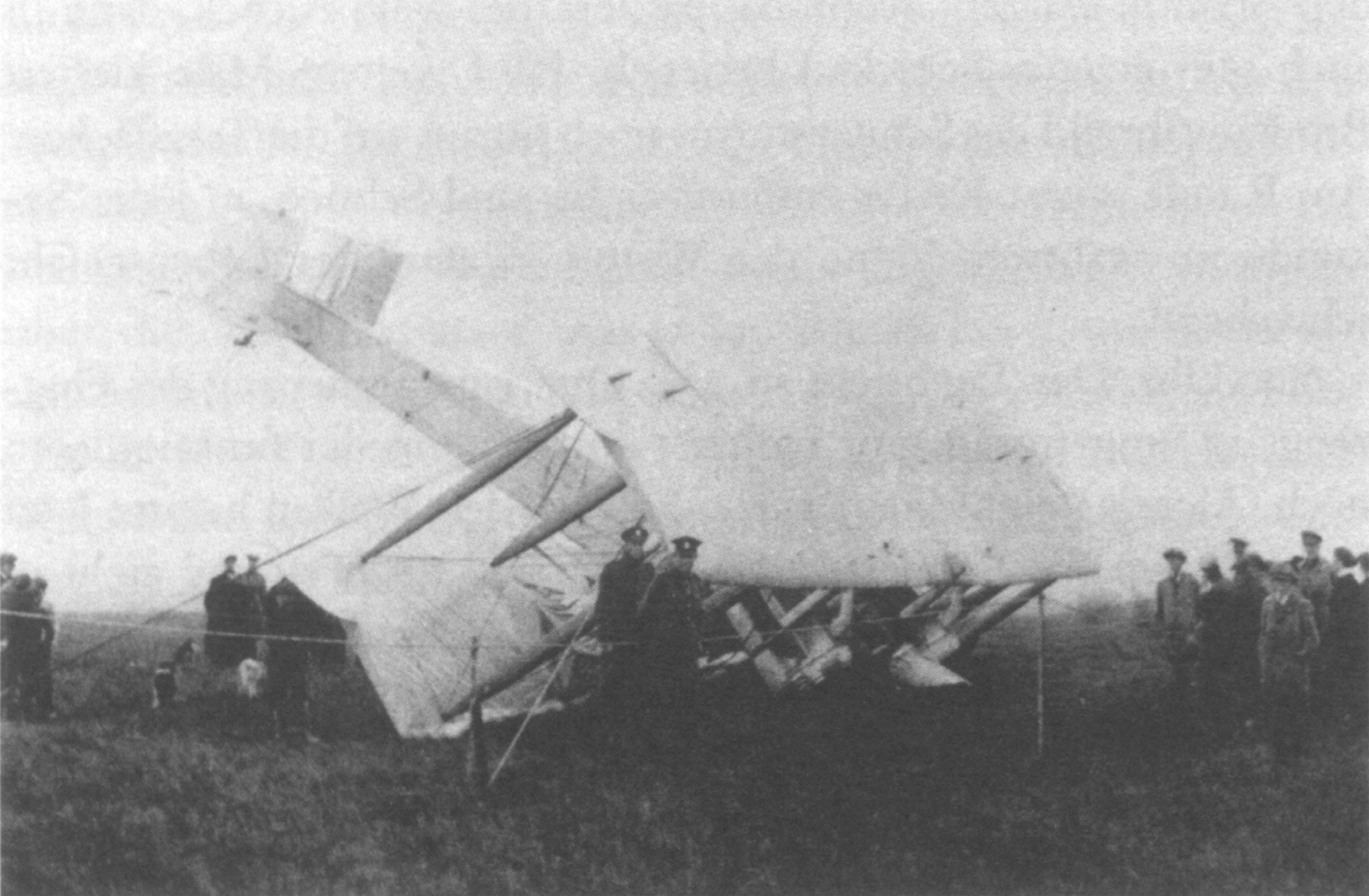
Alcock and Brown's Vimy at Clifden, Ireland on 15 June 1919, having landed in a bog

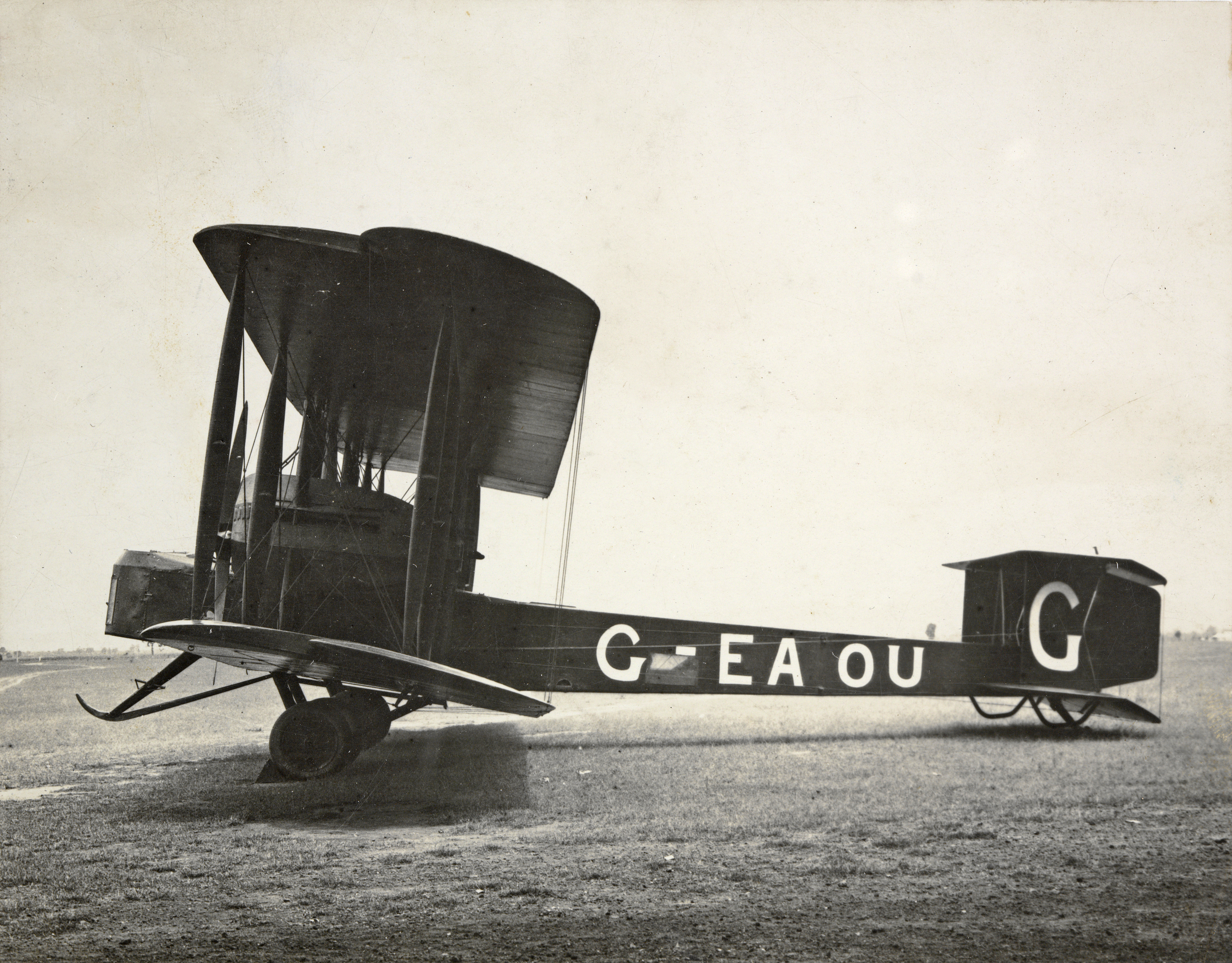
Vickers Vimy, G-EAOU, flown by Ross Macpherson Smith and his brother Keith Macpherson Smith from England to Australia in 1919

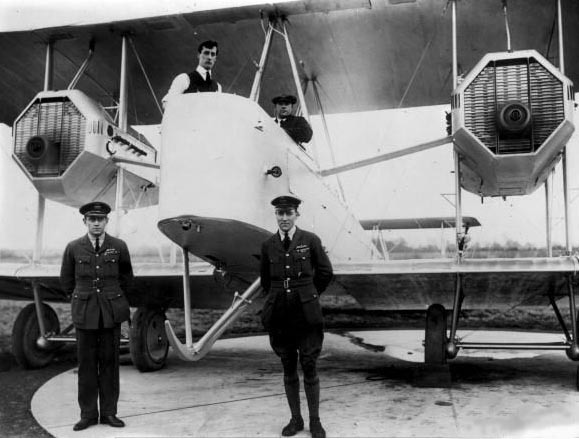
(L-R) Lt Col van Ryneveld with First Lt Quintin Brand, February 1920, in front of Vickers Vimy Silver Queen, before their England to South Africa flight

On 12 June 1918, according to Flight International, the Air Board were to initially deploy the first production Vimy units as maritime patrol aircraft, equipped for anti-submarine warfare, and once this requirement had been satisfied, subsequent aircraft would be allocated to performing night bombing missions from bases in France. This had been due to a recently introduced policy under which the number of land-based aircraft allocated to anti-submarine patrols was to be vastly expanded, from 66 landplanes in November 1917 to a projected force of 726 landplanes, in which the newly available Vimy would be a key aircraft due to its long-range capabilities. During August 1918, the application of floats to the Vimy was studied, but it is not known if any aircraft were ever so fitted.

Throughout the 1920s, the Vimy formed the main heavy bomber force of the RAF; for some years, it was the only twin-engine bomber to be stationed at bases in Britain. On 1 April 1924, No. 9 Squadron and No. 58 Squadron, equipped with the Vimy, stood up, tripling the home-based heavy bomber force. On 1 July 1923, a newly formed Night Flying Flight, based at RAF Biggin Hill, equipped with the Vimy, was formed; during the general strike of 1926, this unit performed aerial deliveries of the British Gazette newspaper throughout the country. Between 1921 and 1926, the type formed the backbone of the airmail service between Cairo and Baghdad. The Vimy served as a front line bomber in the Middle East and in the United Kingdom from 1919 until 1925, by which point it had been replaced by the newer Vickers Virginia.

Despite the emergence of the Virginia, which soon re-equipped numerous Vimy squadrons, the Vimy continued to equip a Special Reserve bomber squadron, 502 Squadron, stationed at Aldergrove in Northern Ireland until 1929. The Vimy, many were re-engined with Bristol Jupiter or Armstrong Siddeley Jaguar radial engines, continued to be used in secondary roles, such as training. The final Vimys, used as target aircraft for searchlight crews, remained in use until 1938.

=== Long-distance flights ===
The most significant of the Vimy's many pioneering flights was the first non-stop crossing of the Atlantic Ocean, made by Alcock and Brown in June 1919. An example was specially constructed for the attempt, with additional fuel tanks to extend its range and a revised undercarriage. Only one such aircraft was built; it is preserved and displayed in the London Science Museum.

In 1919, the Australian government offered £10,000 for the first All-Australian crew to fly an aeroplane from England to Australia. Keith Macpherson Smith, Ross Macpherson Smith and mechanics Jim Bennett and Wally Shiers completed the journey from Hounslow Heath Aerodrome to Darwin via Singapore and Batavia on 10 December 1919. Their aircraft G-EAOU is preserved in a purpose-built, climate-controlled museum in the grounds of the airport in Smith's home town Adelaide, Australia; "The trip from Darwin to Sydney took almost twice as long as the flight to Australia." Vickers Vimy Reserve in Northgate, a suburb of Adelaide, is named in honour of the place the plane landed on its return to South Australia in 1920.

In 1920 Lieutenant Colonel Pierre van Ryneveld and Major Quintin Brand attempted the first England to South Africa flight. They left Brooklands on 4 February 1920 in Vimy G-UABA, named Silver Queen. They landed safely at Heliopolis, but as they continued the flight to Wadi Halfa they were forced to land due to engine overheating with 80 miles (130 km) still to go. A second Vimy was lent to the pair by the RAF at Heliopolis, and named Silver Queen II. This second aircraft reached Bulawayo in Southern Rhodesia, where it was badly damaged when it failed to take off. Van Ryneveld and Brand then used a South African Air Force Airco DH.9 to continue the journey to Cape Town. The South African government awarded them £5,000 each.

=== Vimy Commercial ===
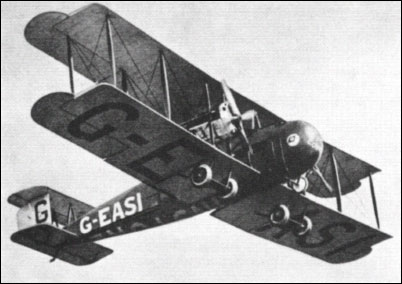
Vickers Vimy Commercial in flight

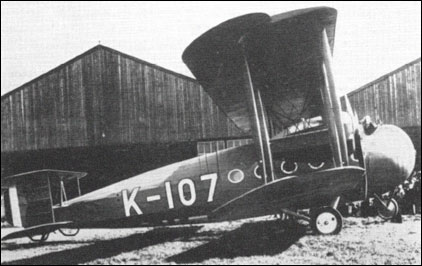
Vickers Vimy Commercial on the ground

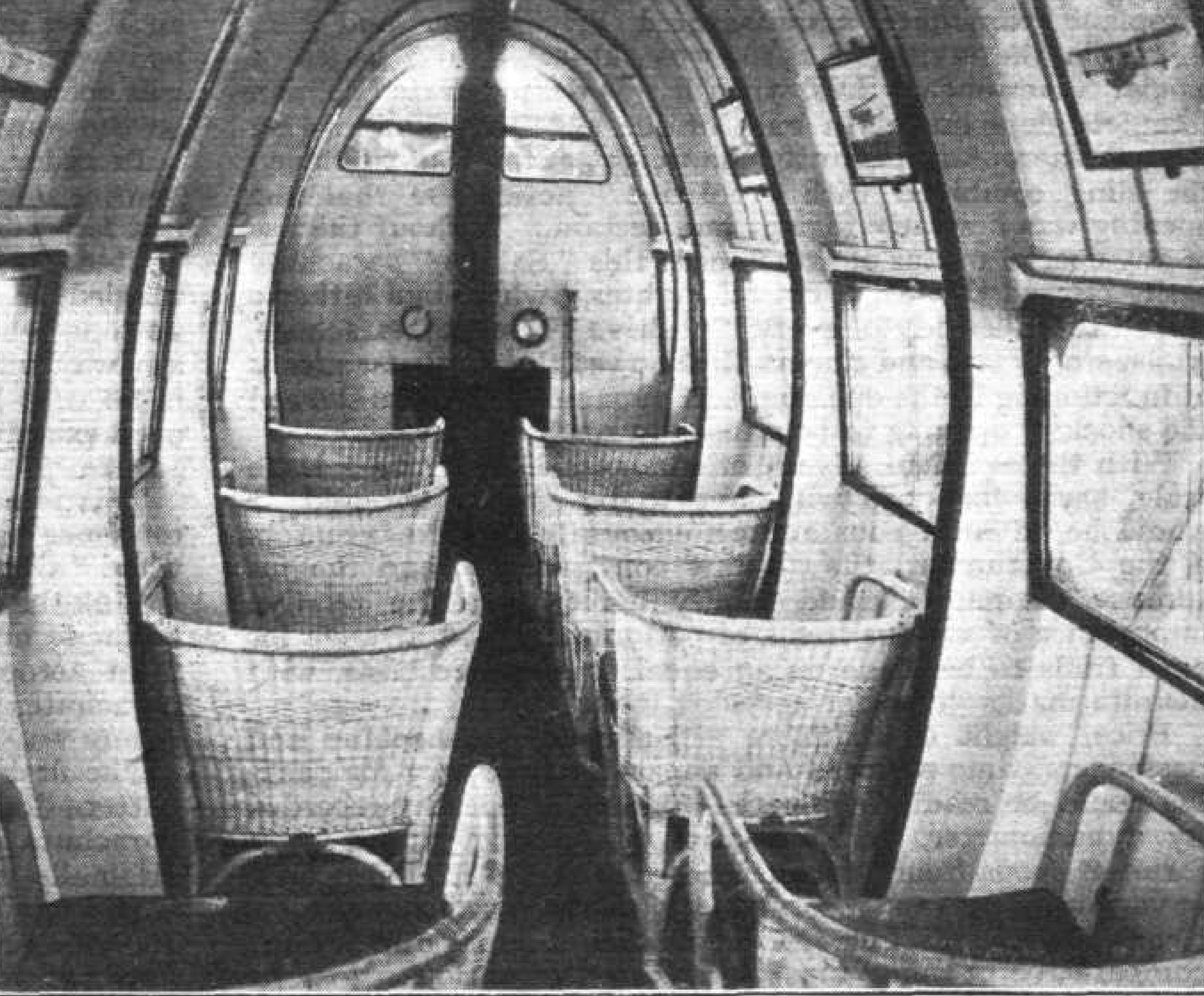
Airliner cabin

The Vimy Commercial was a civilian version with a larger-diameter fuselage (largely of spruce plywood), which was developed at and first flew from the Joyce Green airfield in Kent on 13 April 1919. Initially, it bore the interim civil registration K-107, later being re-registered as G-EAAV.

The prototype entered the 1920 race to Cape Town; it left Brooklands on 24 January 1920 but crashed at Tabora, Tanganyika on 27 February.

In 1919, the Chinese Government placed a large order for aircraft with Vickers, including 100 Vimy Commercials, which was cut to 40 Vimy Commercials when the final contract was signed in 1920. A Chinese order for 100 is particularly noteworthy; forty of the forty-three built were delivered to China, but most remained in their crates unused, and only seven were put into civilian use.

Five Napier Lion-powered air ambulance versions of the Vimy Commercial were built for the RAF as the Vimy Ambulance. Fifty-five more bomber-transport versions of the Vimy Commercial were built for the RAF as the Vickers Vernon.

==== Role in the Second Zhili–Fengtian War ====
After the First Zhili–Fengtian War, 20 Vimy Comercial were secretly converted into bombers under the order of the Zhili clique warlord Cao Kun, and later participated in the Second Zhili–Fengtian War.

During the war these bombers were initially highly successful due to the low-level bombing tactics used, with the air force chief-of-staff of the Zhili clique, General Zhao Buli (趙步壢) personally flying many of the missions. However, on 17 September, returning from a successful bombing mission outside Shanhai Pass, General Zhao's aircraft was hit by ground fire from the Fengtian clique in the region of Nine Gates (Jiumenkou, 九門口) and had to make a forced landing. Zhao made a successful escape back to his base, but the bombers subsequently flew at much higher altitude to avoid ground fire, which greatly reduced their bombing accuracy and effectiveness.

After numerous battles between Chinese warlords, all of the aircraft fell into the hands of the Fengtian clique, forming its First Heavy Bomber Group. These were in the process of being phased out at the time of the Mukden incident and therefore were subsequently captured by the Japanese, who soon disposed of them.

== Variants ==
F.B.27 Vimy
Prototypes; four built, powered by two 200 hp (150 kW) Hispano-Suiza 8 piston engines..
F.B.27A Vimy II
Twin-engine heavy bomber aircraft for the RAF, powered by two 300 hp (220 kW) Rolls-Royce Eagle VIII piston engines.
Vimy Ambulance
Air ambulance version for the RAF.
Vimy Commercial
Civilian transport version, powered by two 300 hp (220 kW) Rolls-Royce Eagle VIII and later 360 hp (270 kW) Rolls-Royce Eagle IX piston engines.
A.N.F. 'Express Les Mureaux'
Vimy Commercial No.42 re-engined with 2x 370 hp (280 kW) Lorraine 12Da V-12 engines by ANF Les Mureaux.

== Operators ==
=== Military operators ===
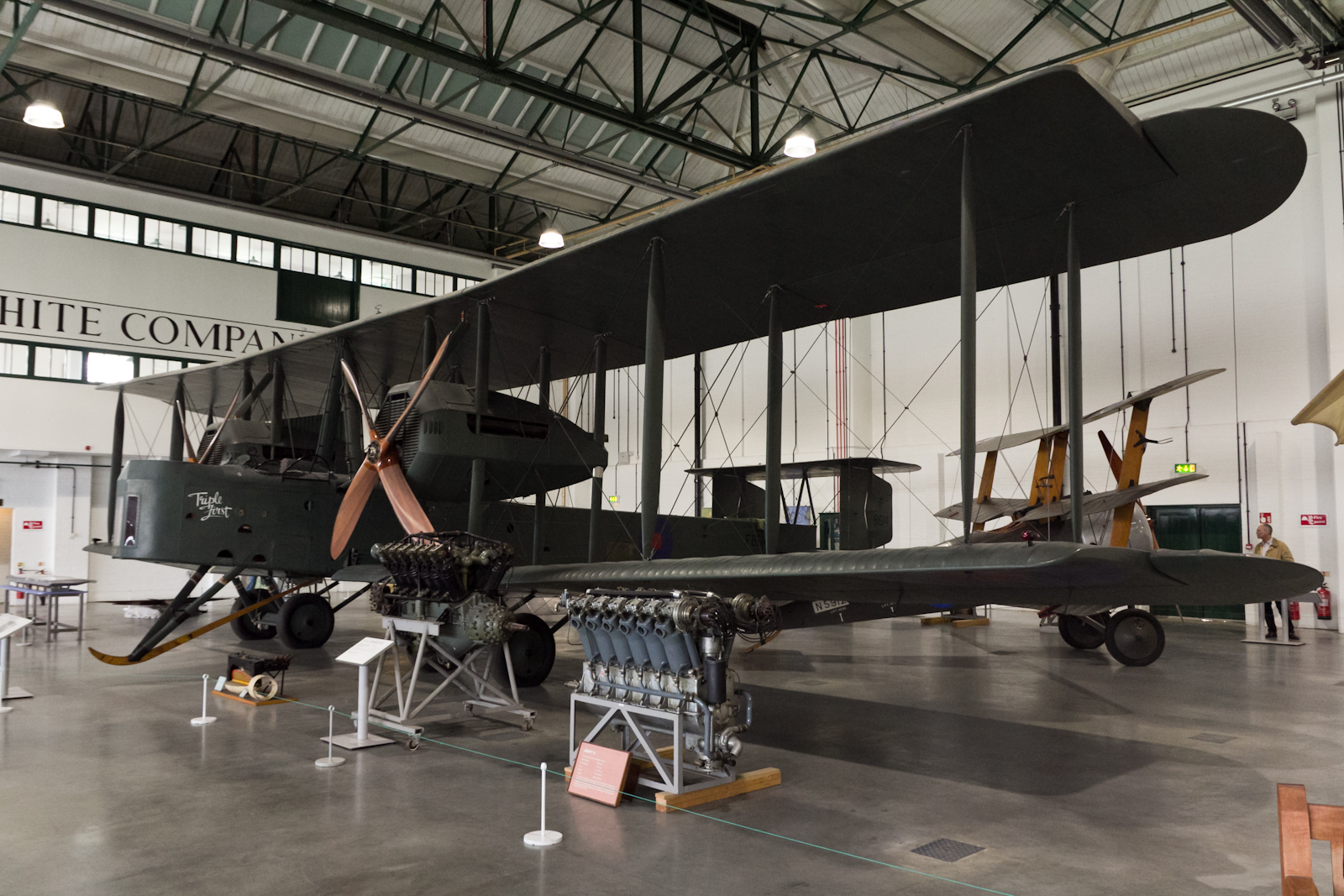
NIVO-painted Vickers Vimy Replica F8614 at the Royal Air Force Museum London

United Kingdom

- Royal Air Force (Vimy, Vimy Ambulance & Vernon).
  - No. 7 Squadron RAF
  - No. 9 Squadron RAF
  - No. 24 Squadron RAF
  - No. 45 Squadron RAF
  - No. 58 Squadron RAF
  - No. 70 Squadron RAF
  - No. 99 Squadron RAF
  - No. 100 Squadron RAF
  - No. 216 Squadron RAF
  - No. 500 Squadron RAF
  - No. 502 Squadron RAF

=== Civil operators ===
China

- The Government of China (Vimy Commercial).

France

- Grands Express Aériens (Vimy Commercial).

Soviet Union

- One aircraft.

Spain

- The Government of Spain (Vimy).

United Kingdom

- Imperial Airways (Vimy Commercial).
- Instone Air Line (Vimy Commercial).

== Aircraft on display ==
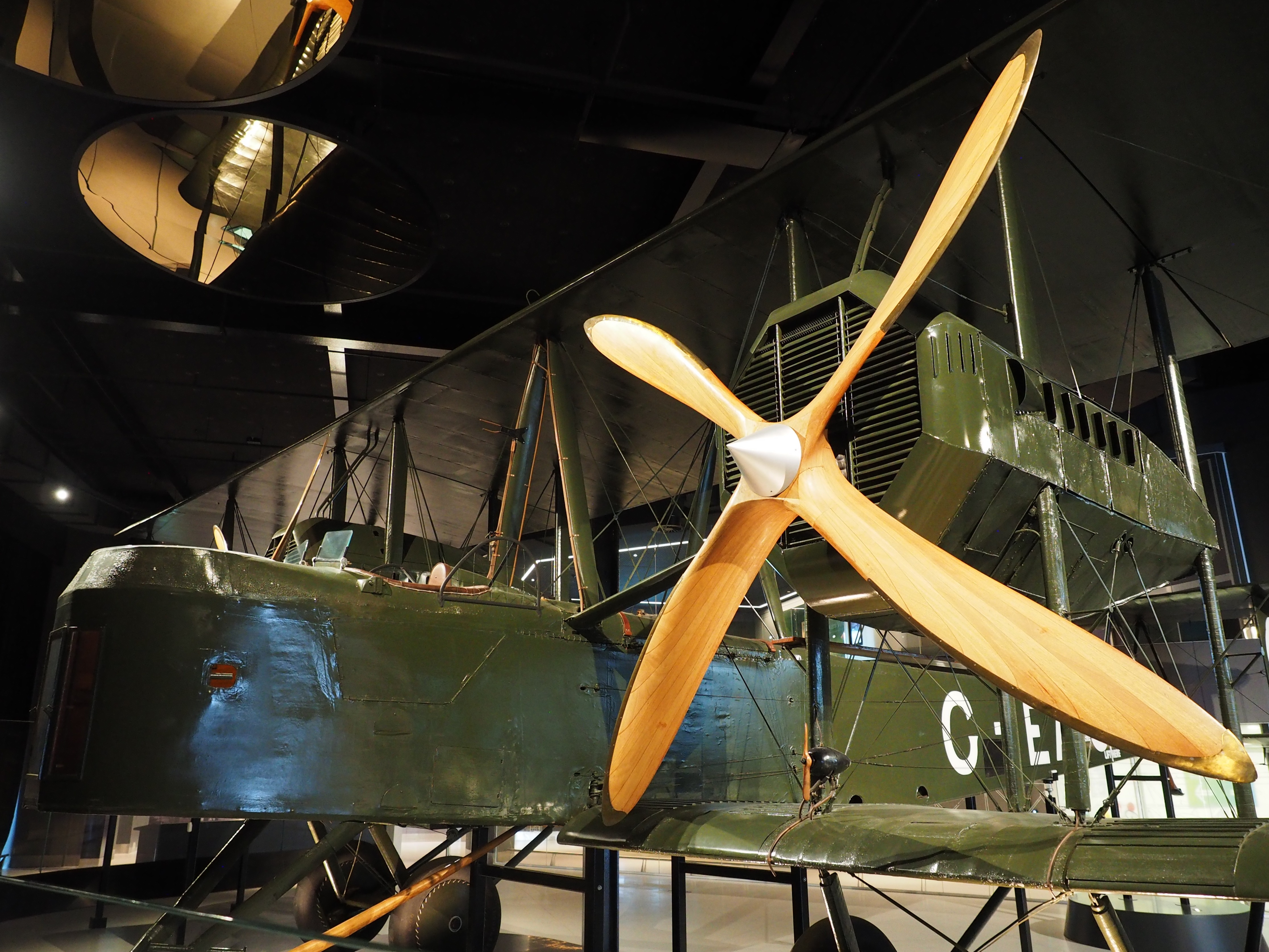
G-EAOU at Adelaide Airport in 2025

Australia

- Vimy IV G-EAOU at Adelaide Airport

United Kingdom

- Vimy IV – Alcock & Brown's transatlantic aircraft at the Science Museum London.

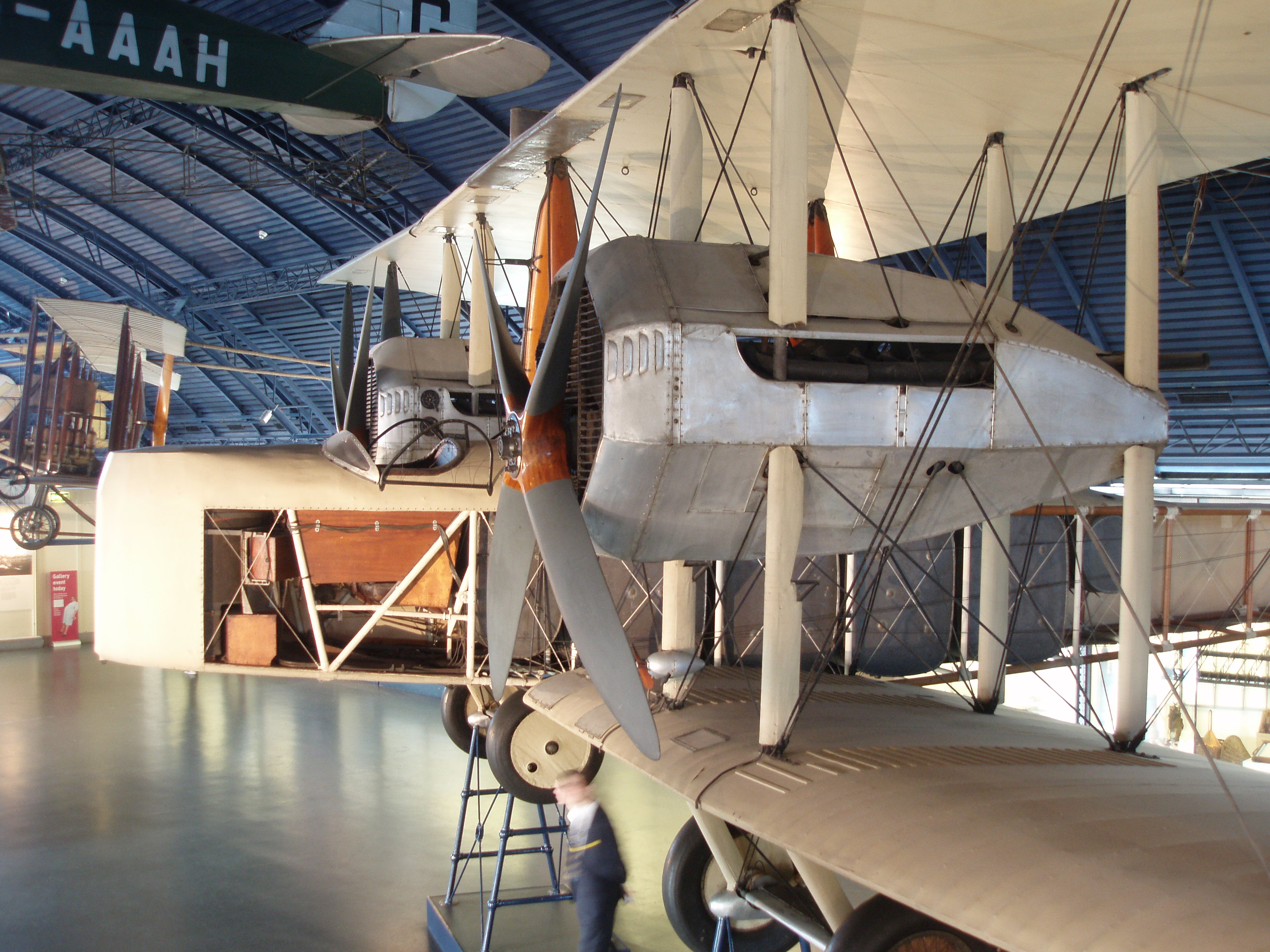
The Vickers Vimy flown by Alcock & Brown on the first transatlantic flight.

== Replicas ==
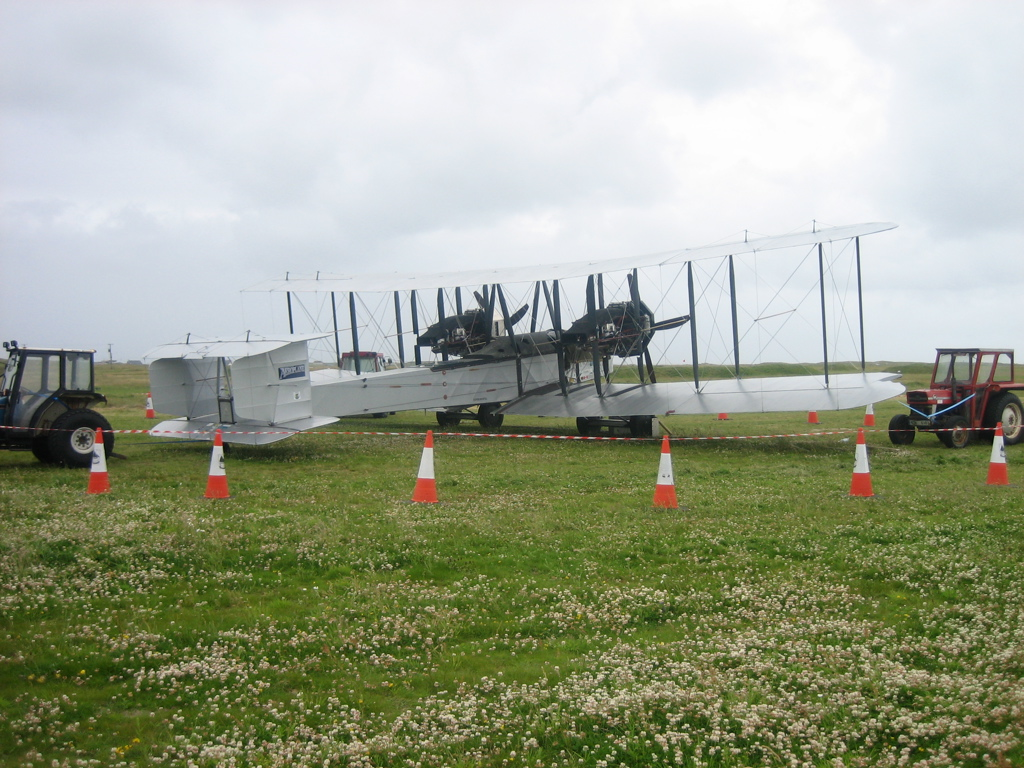
Vickers Vimy replica NX71MY in 2005

A replica transatlantic Vimy cockpit section was built by Vickers for the London Science Museum in the early 1920s, and three full-size replicas have also been built. The first was a taxiable replica commissioned by British Lion Films from Shawcraft Models Ltd of Iver Heath, Bucks; the planned film about Alcock & Brown's transatlantic flight was never made, but the model was completed and paid for. Its fate remains a mystery although it appeared on static display at the Battle of Britain air display at RAF Biggin Hill in 1955 and may have been subsequently stored dismantled in East London until at least the late 1980s. The engine nacelles appear in the mine scene from the film Daleks' Invasion Earth 2150 A.D., so it may not have been in good condition by then.

In 1969 an airworthy Vimy replica (registered G-AWAU) was built by the Vintage Aircraft Flying Association at Brooklands; this was first flown by D. G. 'Dizzy' Addicott and Peter Hoar. It was badly damaged by fire and was displayed until February 2014 at the Royal Air Force Museum London, Hendon, London). It is currently stored dismantled at the RAF Museum storage facility in Stafford.

A second flyable Vimy replica, NX71MY, was built in 1994 by an Australian-American team led by Lang Kidby and Peter McMillan, and this aircraft successfully recreated the three great pioneering Vimy flights: England to Australia flown by Lang Kidby and Peter McMillan (in 1994), England to South Africa flown by Mark Rebholz and John LaNoue (1999) and in 2005, Alcock and Brown's 1919 Atlantic crossing was recreated by Steve Fossett and Mark Rebholz. The aircraft was donated to Brooklands Museum in 2006 and was kept airworthy in order to commemorate the 90th anniversaries of the Transatlantic and Australian flights, then retired in late 2009. Its final flight was made by John Dodd, Clive Edwards and Peter McMillan from Dunsfold to Brooklands on 15 November 2009 and four days later, in 18 hours, the aircraft was dismantled, transported the short distance to the museum and reassembled inside the main hangar by a dedicated volunteer team. Two days later a special Brooklands Vimy Exhibition was officially opened by Peter McMillan, and this unique aircraft is now on public display there.

== Specifications ==
Three-view of Vickers Vimy.

Data from Profile Publications No. 005: Vickers F.B.27 Vimy

General characteristics

- Crew: 3
- Length: 43 ft 7 in (13.28 m)
- Wingspan: 68 ft 1 in (20.75 m)
- Height: 15 ft 8 in (4.78 m)
- Wing area: 1,330 sq ft (124 m^{2})
- Empty weight: 7,104 lb (3,222 kg)
- Max takeoff weight: 10,884 lb (4,937 kg)
- Powerplant: 2 × Rolls-Royce Eagle VIII water-cooled V12 engines, 300 hp (220 kW) each

Performance

- Maximum speed: 100 mph (160 km/h, 87 kn)
- Range: 900 mi (1,400 km, 780 nmi)
- Service ceiling: 7,000 ft (2,100 m)

Armament

- Guns: 1 × .303 in (7.7 mm) Lewis Gun in Scarff ring in nose and 1 × in Scarff ring in mid-fuselage
- Bombs: 2,476 lb (1,123 kg) of bombs

== See also ==
Related development

- Vickers Vernon
- Vickers Virginia

Aircraft of comparable role, configuration, and era

- AEG G.IV, G.V
- Friedrichshafen G.III, G.IV & V
- Gotha G.V, G.VI, G.VII, G.VIII, G.IX
- Handley Page Type O
