= AEG G.V =

WWI bomber biplane

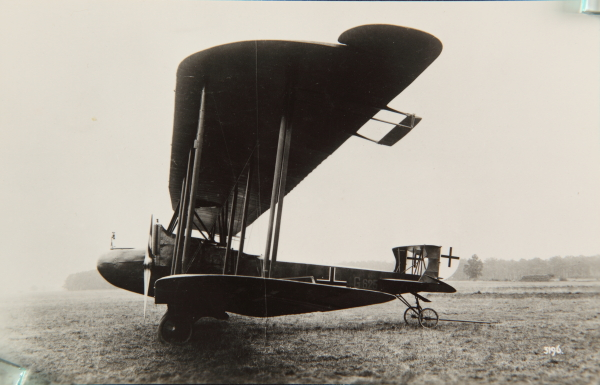

General information
- Type: Bomber
- National origin: German Empire
- Manufacturer: AEG
- Primary users: Luftstreitkräfte Deutsche Luftreederei; Swedish Air Force
- Number built: 37+

History
- Manufactured: 1918
- Introduction date: 1918
- Developed from: AEG G.IV

The AEG G.V was a biplane bomber aircraft of World War I built by the Allgemeine Elektricitäts-Gesellschaft (AEG) during the First World War for the Imperial German Army's (Deutsches Heer) Imperial German Air Service (Luftstreitkräfte). It made its first flight in 1918 and was an enlarged and improved version of the G.IV. The type saw limited production before the Armistice in November, and never entered operational service. Six G.Vs were sold to the Swedish Air Force after the war. At least one aircraft was converted into a six-passenger airliner for Deutsche Luft-Reederei after the war as the G5.

== Development ==
AEG began work on a aircraft that was capable of carrying a 1,000-kilogram (2,200 lb) bomb in November 1917. It was based on the G.IVb-lang model with extended wings and a large increase in wing area. It retained the lengthened fuselage and the biplane tail structure of that model, but reverted to the water-cooled 260-horsepower (190 kW) Mercedes D.IVa straight-six piston engines of the original G.IV. It is not known when the G.V began flight testing or when it made its first flight, but surviving documents state that it attained a height of 4,000 m (13,000 ft) in 70 minutes carrying a useful load of 2,100 kg (4,600 lb) in May 1918. The Inspectorate of Flying Troops (Inspektion der Fliegertruppen (Idflieg) placed an order for 50 aircraft the previous month and the first nine G.Vs were delivered in August. A total of 37 were delivered between August and October.

The G5 was a version of the G.V modified for airline use. Initially, passengers sat in an open cockpit behind the pilots, but AEG soon modified the aircraft with an enclosed cabin, a toilet and fitted the nose with a hinged door for baggage. At least one aircraft served with Deutsche Luft-Reederei beginning in 1919.

The Swedish Air Force purchased six G.Vs shortly after the Armistice. Two were destroyed during the delivery flights in 1919, but AEG delivered replacements later that year.

== Operators ==
German Empire

- Luftstreitkrafte
- Deutsche Luft-Reederei

Sweden

- Swedish Air Force

== Specifications (AEG G.V) ==
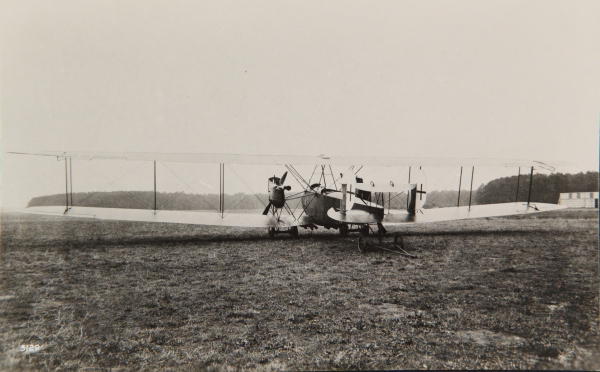
AEG G.V rear

Data from German Aircraft of the First World War; A.E.G. Aircraft of WWI: A Centennial Perspective on Great War Airplanes

General characteristics

- Crew: 3 or 4
- Capacity: 6
- Length: 10.8 m (35 ft 5 in)
- Upper wingspan: 27.24 m (89 ft 4 in)
- Lower wingspan: 26.3 m (86 ft 3 in)
- Height: 4.5 m (14 ft 9 in)
- Wing area: 127.2 m^{2} (1,369 sq ft)
- Empty weight: 2,700 kg (5,952 lb)
- Gross weight: 4,800 kg (10,582 lb)
- Powerplant: 2 × Mercedes D.IVa water-cooled straight-six piston engine, 190 kW (260 hp) each
- Propellers: 2-bladed

Performance

- Maximum speed: 145 km/h (90 mph, 78 kn)
- Time to altitude: 6 minutes to 1,000 m (3,300 ft)
- 12 minutes to 2,000 m (6,600 ft)

Armament

- Guns: 2 or 3 manually operated 7.92 mm (.312 in) machine-guns
- Bombs: 1,000 kg (2,200 lb) of bombs

== See also ==
Related development

- AEG G.I
- AEG G.II
- AEG G.III
- AEG G.IV

Aircraft of comparable role, configuration, and era

- Friedrichshafen G.III, G.IV & V
- Gotha G.V, G.VI, G.VII, G.VIII, G.IX
- Handley Page O/400
- Vickers Vimy

Related lists

- List of military aircraft of Germany
- List of bomber aircraft

== Bibliography ==
- Andersson, Lennart & Sanger, Ray (2014). Retribution and Recovery: German Aircraft and Aviation 1919 to 1922. Staplefield, UK: Air-Britain (Historians). ISBN 978-0-85130-467-0.
- Gray, Peter & Thetford, Owen (1987) [1970]. German Aircraft of the First World War (2nd ed.). London: Putnam. ISBN 0-85177-809-7.
- Herris, Jack (2015). A.E.G. Aircraft of WWI: A Centennial Perspective on Great War Airplanes. Great War Aviation Centennial Series. Vol. 16. n. p.: Aeronaut Books. ISBN 978-1-935881-28-5.
