= Friedrichshafen N.I =

WWI German bomber

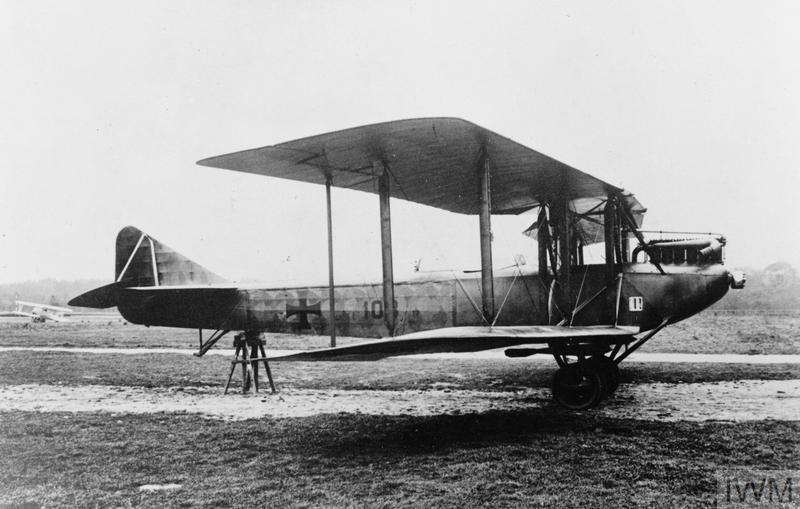
- A profile view of the N.I

General information
- Type: Bomber
- Manufacturer: Friedrichshafen
- Number built: 1

History
- First flight: 1917

The Friedrichshafen N.I was a German prototype night bomber built by Friedrichshafen during World War I.

== Design and development ==
The Friedrichshafen N.I was a two-seat biplane equipped with a 260 hp (190 kW) Mercedes D.IVa engine, double-mainwheel tri-cycle landing gear and large relatively highly swept biplane wings. It flew in 1917, but flight testing revealed a number of deficiencies, the main one of which was the large length of the nose, which made it difficult for the pilot to get a look at landing, especially at night.

== See also ==
Related lists

- List of military aircraft of Germany
- List of bomber aircraft

== Bibliography ==
- Gray, Peter; Thetford, Owen (1970). German Aircraft of the First World War (2nd ed.). London: Putnam. ISBN 0-370-00103-6.
- Herris, Jack (2016). Friedrichshafen Aircraft of WWI: A Centennial Perspective on Great War Airplanes. Great War Aviation Centennial Series. Vol. 21. n.p.: Aeronaut Books. ISBN 978-1-935881-35-3.
- Herris, Jack (2012). Nachtflugzeug: German N-Types of WWI. Great War Aviation Centennial Series. Vol. 3. n. p.: Aeronaut Books. ISBN 978-1-935881-10-0.
