= Rex Pierson =

English aircraft designer (1891–1948)

- Born: 9 February 1891; Little Fransham, Norfolk, England
- Died: 10 January 1948 (aged 56); Cranleigh, Surrey, England
- Education: Felsted School
- Engineering career
- Discipline: Aircraft designer
- Institutions: Vickers Limited; Vickers-Armstrongs Limited
- Significant design: Vickers Vimy
- Awards: Commander of the Order of the British Empire

Reginald Kirshaw "Rex" Pierson CBE (9 February 1891 – 10 January 1948) was an English aircraft designer and chief designer at Vickers Limited later Vickers-Armstrongs Aircraft Ltd. He was responsible for the Vickers Vimy, a heavy bomber designed during World War I and the first aircraft to cross the Atlantic non-stop. He was the chief designer of the Vickers Wellington bomber of World War II.

== Early life ==
Pierson was born on 9 February 1891 at Little Fransham, Norfolk, the son of the rector the Reverend Kirshaw T. Pierson and his wife Helen Mary. He was educated at the Felsted School in Essex.

== Career ==
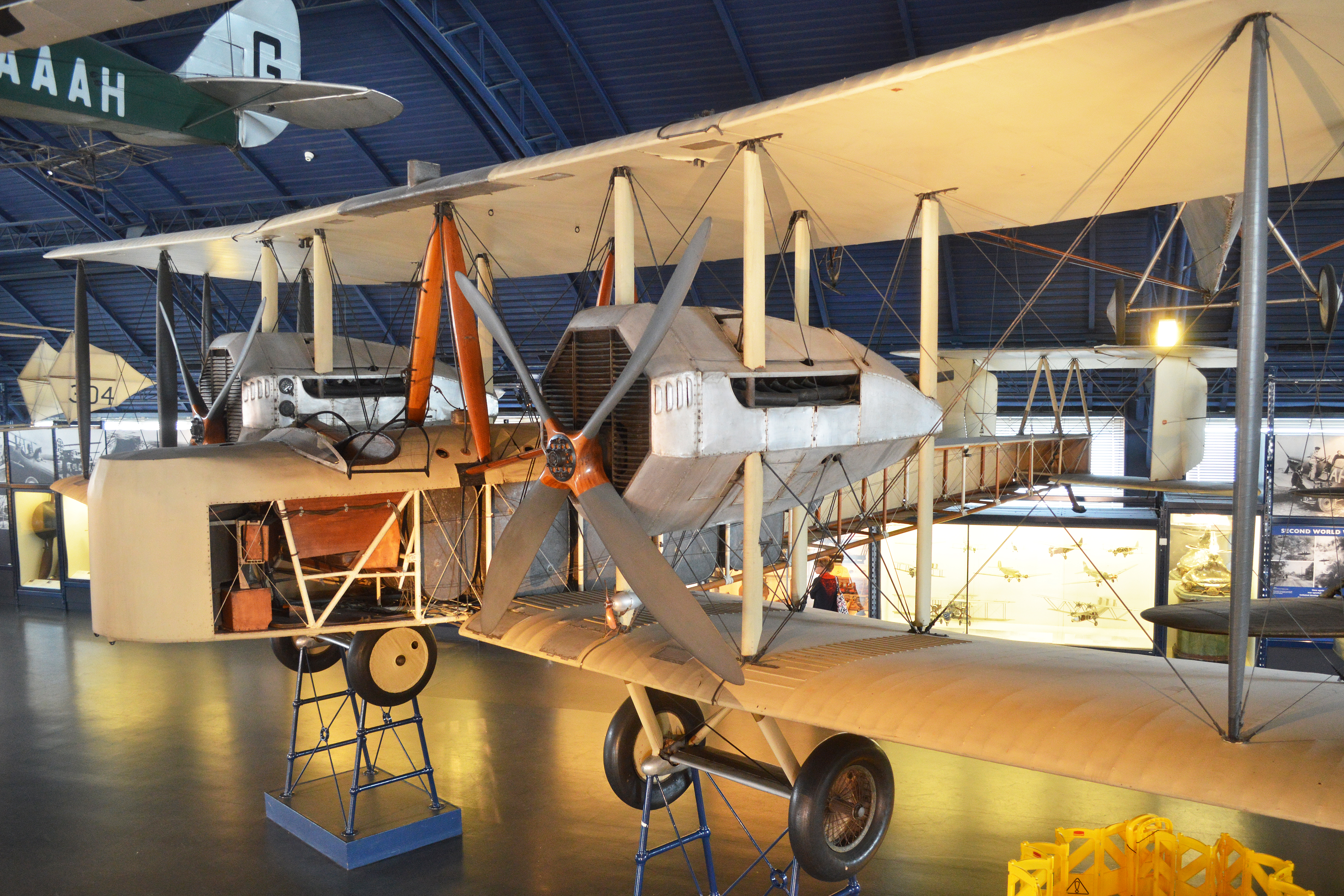
Vickers Vimy of Alcock and Brown, which landed at Clifden, at the Science Museum in June 2015

=== Vickers ===
Although his father wanted him to work in a bank, young Rex started an apprenticeship in 1908 with Vickers at Erith. As soon as the company started an aircraft section in 1911 he joined that part of the company and learned to fly. He gained Royal Aero Club Aviator's certificate number 660 on 14 October 1913 at Brooklands. By 1917 he was the chief aircraft designer at Vickers based in its Knightsbridge offices in London.

In 1917 he designed the twin-engined Vickers Vimy biplane heavy bomber which entered service with the Royal Air Force in 1919. A Vimy flown by John Alcock and Arthur Brown made the first non-stop crossing of the Atlantic Ocean in June 1919. Among his many other designs were the Vickers Vespa which held the world altitude record in 1932 and the Vickers Wellesley which held the world long distance record in 1938.

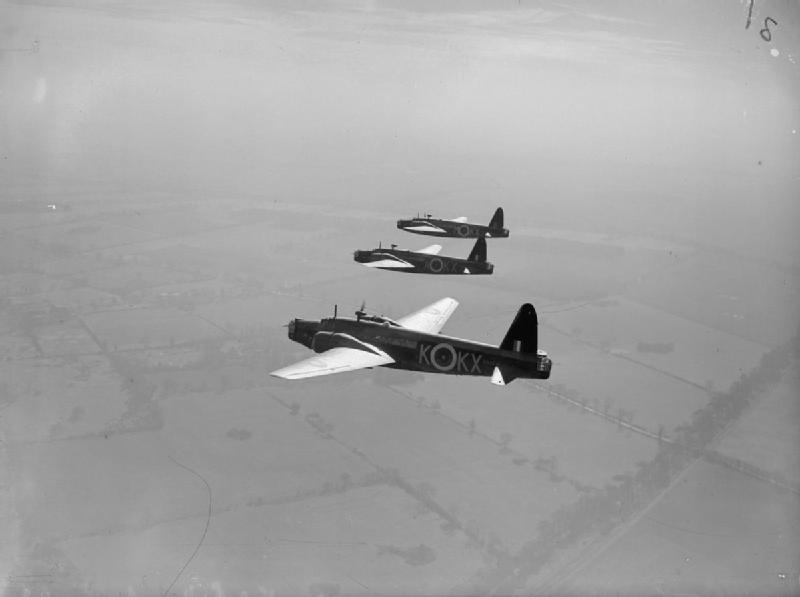
Wellingtons of 311 Sqn at RAF East Wretham in Norfolk

=== Vickers Wellington ===
He was also chief designer of the Vickers Wellington twin-engined bomber, of which nearly 11,500 were built between 1936 and 1945, the largest production run of any multi-engined British aircraft. The prototype Wellington K4049 first flew on 15 June 1936 from Brooklands in the hands of Vickers Chief Test Pilot "Mutt" Summers.

=== Post war ===
Postwar designs included the Viking, Valetta and Viscount. Pierson was promoted to chief engineer in 1946. His successor as chief designer was the engineer and industrial leader Sir George Edwards.

== Personal life ==
After a long illness Pierson died at his home in Cranleigh, Surrey on 10 January 1948 aged 56. His name and achievements are commemorated by an annual R K Pierson Lecture held by the Royal Aeronautical Society (Weybridge Branch) at Brooklands Museum, usually in November. The museum also displays a unique collection of aircraft produced by the Vickers design team led by Pierson and Edwards from 1917-60.

Business positions
| Preceded by | Chief Designer of Vickers; 1917-1946 | Succeeded by Sir George Edwards |
