= Friedrichshafen G.IV =

G.IV, G.V, and FF.62
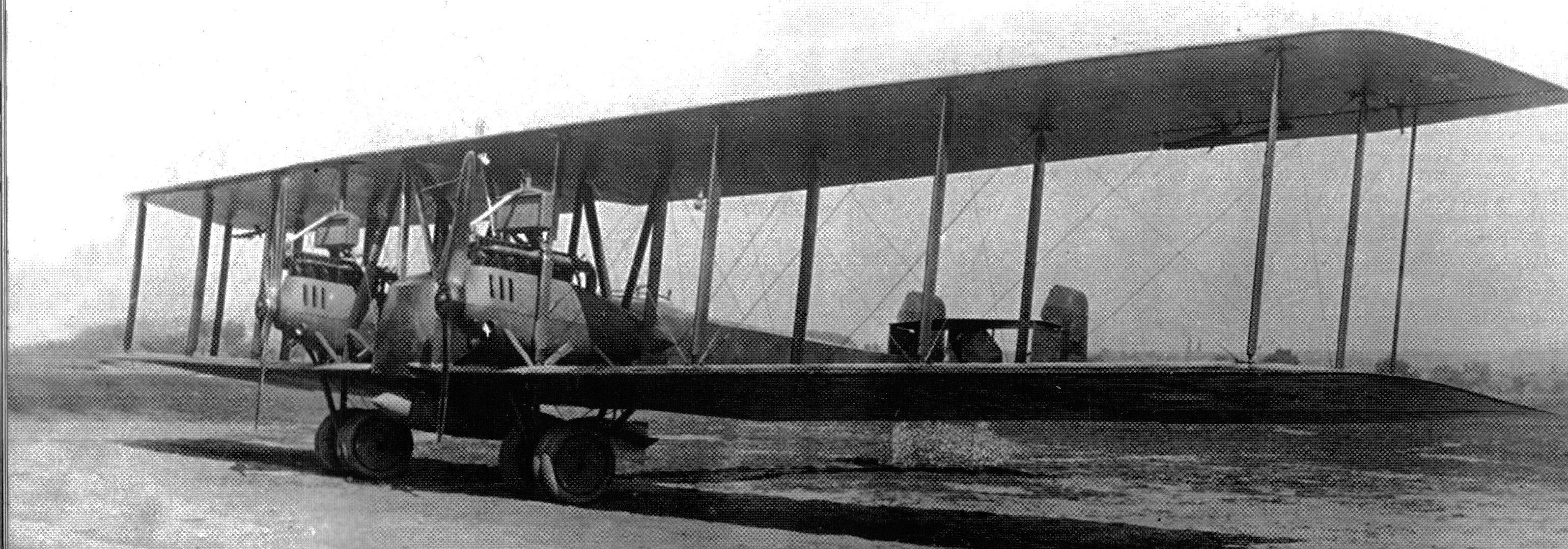
- The G.V prototype on the day of its first flight, 9 May 1918

General information
- Type: Bomber
- Manufacturer: Flugzeugbau Friedrichshafen GmbH
- Designer: Karl Gehlen
- Primary user: Luftstreitkräfte
- Number built: 138

History
- Manufactured: 1918
- First flight: 1918
- Developed from: Friedrichshafen G.III

The Friedrichshafen G.IV and G.V (factory designations FF.61 and FF.55) respectively were heavy bombers that were designed and manufactured in Germany during World War I by Flugzeugbau Friedrichshafen. The G.IV saw limited use by the Luftstreitkräfte (German Imperial Air Service) for tactical and limited strategic bombing operations, while the G.V and a follow-on design, the FF.62 did not fly until after the Armistice.

== Development ==
Although the G.III series had proven to be successful, Friedrichshafen engineers began to work on a replacement aircraft during 1917. Faced with the fact that any successor would have to be powered by the same 190 kW (260 hp) Mercedes D.IVa engine as the G.III series, engineers decided to increase performance by trying to lighten the aircraft. In part this was achieved by completely removing the nose gunner's position. Another major change was that the twin engines were now arranged in a tractor configuration for the first time. Two basic versions of this bomber were produced; the G.IV which had a similar tail unit as the G.III, while the G.IVa had a tail unit similar to that of the G.IIIa and G.IIIb. Other than modifications to the fuselage and tail surfaces to account for the change in the aircraft's center of gravity the G.IV series aircraft were roughly similar to the G.III series aircraft. Little is known of the wartime career of the G.IV and G.IVa. Two batches of these bombers were ordered from Friedrichshafen and Daimler and some of them were delivered before the war ended. While it is certain that some examples of the improved Friedrichshafen G.IV were delivered it is not clear how many they were or whether they saw service at the front.

The G.V was generally similar to the G.IVs, and featured a similar box-like tail unit. It differed, however, in having an even shorter forward fuselage, so that the nose of the aircraft was now behind the propeller discs. This allowed the engines to be moved closer to the aircraft's centreline, making asymmetrical thrust less of a problem in the case of the failure of one of its engines. A single prototype flew on 9 May 1918, but it was not put into production. The FF.62 did not fly until 20 November, and was generally similar except for reverting to Mercedes D.IVa in place of the new Maybach Mb IVa engines used on the G.V.

== Operators ==
- German Empire
  - Luftstreitkrafte

== Specifications (G.IV) ==
Data from Flugzeugbau Friedrichshafen GmbH

General characteristics

- Crew: 3
- Length: 12 m (39 ft 4 in)
- Wingspan: 22.6 m (74 ft 2 in)
- Wing area: 87 m^{2} (940 sq ft)
- Empty weight: 2,880 kg (6,349 lb)
- Gross weight: 4,980 kg (10,979 lb)
- Fuel capacity: 671 kg (1,479 lb)
- Powerplant: 2 × Mercedes D.IVa 6-cylinder water-cooled in-line piston engines, 190 kW (260 hp) each
- Propellers: 2-bladed pusher propellers

Performance

- Maximum speed: 142 km/h (88 mph, 77 kn)

Armament

- Guns: 2 × 7.92 mm (0.312 in) Parabellum MG14 machine guns on flexible mounts
- Bombs: Up to 1,000 kg (2,200 lb)) of bombs

== See also ==
- Idflieg aircraft designation system

Related development

- Friedrichshafen G.I
- Friedrichshafen G.II
- Friedrichshafen G.III

Aircraft of comparable role, configuration, and era

- AEG G.V
- Gotha G.V, G.VI, G.VII, G.VIII, G.IX
- Handley Page O/400

== Bibliography ==
- Herris, Jack (2016). Friedrichshafen Aircraft of WWI: A Centennial Perspective on Great War Airplanes. Great War Aviation Centennial Series. Vol. 21. Aeronaut Books. ISBN 978-1-935881-35-3.
