= Friedrichshafen G.III =

1917 German heavy bomber

G.III
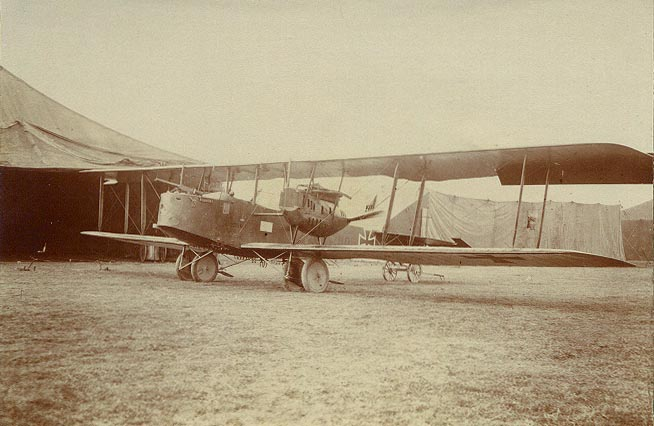
- Friedrichshafen G.III

General information
- Type: Bomber
- Manufacturer: Flugzeugbau Friedrichshafen GmbH
- Designer: Karl Gehlen
- Primary user: Luftstreitkräfte
- Number built: ~734

History
- Manufactured: 1917 to 1918
- Introduction date: 1917
- First flight: 1917
- Developed from: Friedrichshafen G.II
- Developed into: Friedrichshafen G.IV

The Friedrichshafen G.III (factory designation FF.45) was a heavy bomber designed and manufactured by Flugzeugbau Friedrichshafen. They were used by the German Imperial Air Service during World War I for tactical and limited strategic bombing operations. After the end of the war a number of Friedrichshafen bombers were converted into transport aircraft while a small number also saw service as dedicated airliners.

== Development ==
The earlier G.II paved the way for the larger and more powerful G.III, which entered service in early 1917. While it looked somewhat similar to the G.II, the G.III was longer and had a greater wingspan which caused its designers to increase the number of interplane struts to three pairs on each side of the fuselage. Operational experience with the G.II had revealed a tendency for the aircraft to "nose over" during landings with deadly consequences for the nose gunner and possibly also the pilot. Friedrichshafen engineers solved this problem by equipping the G.III with an auxiliary wheel mounted under the nose gunner's position. The G.III also used the more powerful six-cylinder 190 kW (260 hp) Mercedes D.IVa engines. The extra power increased the bomb carrying capability enabling the aircraft to carry a bomb load of up to 1,000 kg (2,200 lb), though this severely reduced operational range. In practice, the heaviest bomb load rarely exceeded 600 kg (1,320 lb). Some of the bomb load could be carried internally but most of it was carried on removable external bomb-racks and usually consisted of streamlined P.u.W bombs but specialized munitions such as air-mines could also be carried. As production continued modifications were made to the G.III series that resulted in further two sub-variants:

== Variants ==
The Friedrichshafen G.III series was ordered in large numbers from Friedrichshafen (709 ordered), Daimler (75 ordered) and Hanseatische Flugzeug Werke (280 ordered) and most of these aircraft were delivered before the war ended.

Friedrichshafen G.IIIa

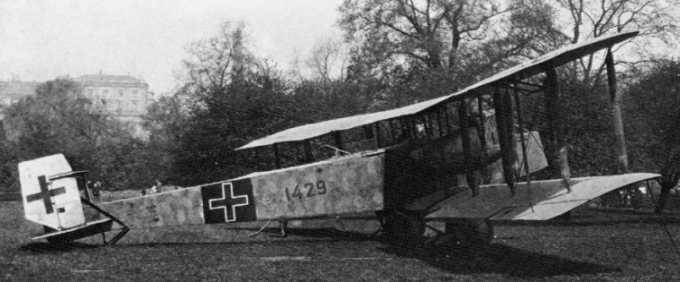
Friedrichshafen G.IIIa on display in England after the war

This sub-variant reintroduced a box-shaped biplane tail unit which improved the aircraft's control response when it was being flown on one engine. Another modification was the installation of a third 7.92 mm (0.312 in) machine gun to combat British night fighters, which often attacked German bombers from below where they were hard to spot but the bomber's silhouette was easy to see against the night sky. This gun was mounted on a tubular, sliding mounting bolted to the floor of the rear gunner's position and was fired downward through a small sloping gun-tunnel cut into the bottom of the rear fuselage. By the last year of the war, the G.IIIa had replaced the G.III in production.

Friedrichshafen G.IIIb

Towards the end of the war, the G.IIIa was further modified by re-designing the rear gunner's position, which was connected to the pilot's cockpit by an open passageway.

Friedrichshafen G.IIIa(Oef) Series 54

A license for the production of the Friedrichshafen G.IIIa was acquired by the Oesterreichische Flugzeugfabrik A.G. (Oeffag) for the Austro-Hungarian Luftfahrttruppe but the project was cut short before production began by the end of World War I.

Transport and airliner conversions

After the end of World War I, the German government and at least one commercial airline, Deutsche Luft-Reederei (DLR), operated a fleet of Friedrichshafen G.III series aircraft which were used to transport mail, high priority cargoes and the occasional passenger to and from a variety of destinations including some long-distance flights to Ukraine. For this purpose, a standard bomber, usually a G.IIIa or G.IIIb, was subjected to a set of modifications ranging from the simple disarmament to fitting a rudimentary cargo compartment in place of the rear gunner's position. Some of the DLR aircraft had the rear gunner's position replaced with a fully enclosed, glazed passenger cabin. Eventually, all these operations were stopped by the Allies in accordance with the Treaty of Versailles.

Production
G.III
Friedrichshafen: 309
Daimler: 160
Hansa-Brandenburg: 75
G.IIIa
Friedrichshafen: ~100
Daimler: 70
Hansa-Brandenburg: ~20

== Operations ==
In front-line service with the Luftstreitkräfte, the G.III series equipped a large portion of the bomber force until the end of the war. The G.III series bombers served mainly on the Western Front where they were used to great effect. Being the most numerous German bomber type, Friedrichshafen G.III/IIIa bombers would have been responsible for much of the damage done by the German bomber force. (Note: While not as deadly as their World War II counterparts World War I bombers could be quite effective. One example of this is an attack by nine German bombers on No. 2 Base Mechanical Transport Depot on 11 August 1918 which destroyed spares for over 20,000 vehicles. This was equivalent to almost half the British motor transport fleet on the Western Front at the time (Harvey, 1993, P.401) . The total monetary damage caused in this one air raid amounted to £1.25 million in which was almost as much damage as caused by the entire bombing campaign on Britain (Imrie 1991, p.6).) Friedrichshafen bombers were used for attacks on tactical targets behind the Allied lines as well as for strategic air raids on major urban centers such as Paris. As far as is known no Friedrichshafen bombers of any type ever participated in strategic air raids on Britain. The attacks on Britain were conducted exclusively by Gotha G.IV and G.V medium bombers, Zeppelin Staaken R.IV heavy bombers and Zeppelin airships. (Note: Fredette (1991) gives a history of the raids on Britain and Groz et al. (1988) which contains they history of the Zeppelin R planes.) The G.III was generally well liked by its military crews for its load carrying capability, reliability and robustness. The G.III/G.IIIa had a useful load of 1235/1500 kg, that of the Gotha G.IV 730 kg and that of the AEG G.IV was 1235 kg These same qualities also made it popular with commercial operators during its short post-war career as a transport aircraft and airliner.

The Polish Air Force captured two German aircraft in 1919, when they performed courier flights to Ukraine over Poland. One of them (G.IIIa 511/17) was used in combat during Polish-Soviet War from September 1920 in the 21st Destroyer Escadre, among others bombing Zhmerynka station on 11 October 1920. The second aircraft (G.III 506/17) remained in reserve. There was also the third bomber bought, but there is no information as for its usage.

== Operators ==
German Empire

- Luftstreitkrafte

Lithuania

- Lithuanian Air Force - two aircraft out of which reportedly one (No. 236) was flying in 1920–1923.

Poland

- Polish Air Force - 2 or 3 aircraft, used during Polish-Soviet War in 1920

Sweden

- Swedish Air Force

== Specifications (Friedrichshafen G.III) ==
Data from Flugzeugbau Friedrichshafen GmbH

General characteristics

- Crew: 3
- Length: 12.65 m (41 ft 6 in)
- Wingspan: 23.85 m (78 ft 3 in)
- Height: 4.14 m (13 ft 7 in)
- Wing area: 95.0 m^{2} (1,023 sq ft)
- Empty weight: 2,371 kg (5,227 lb)
- Max takeoff weight: 3,795 kg (8,367 lb)
- Powerplant: 2 × Mercedes D.IVa six-cylinder water-cooled inline piston engine, 190 kW (260 hp) each

Performance

- Maximum speed: 140 km/h (87 mph, 76 kn)
- Range: 525 km (326 mi, 283 nmi) approx. (Note: Range was not normally specified in contemporary documents who simply stated that flight duration was '5 hours'. This could, and frequently was, extended somewhat by installing additional fuel tanks.)
- Endurance: 5 hours
- Service ceiling: 4,500 m (14,800 ft)

Armament

- Guns: Usually 2-3 × 7.92 mm (0.312 in) Parabellum MG14 machine guns.
- Bombs: Any combination of 12.5 kg (28 lb), 50 kg (110 lb), 100 kg (220 lb), 300 kg (660 lb) or 1,000 kg (2,200 lb) P.u.W bombs or air-mines up to a maximum load of 1,000 kg (2,200 lb).

== See also ==
- Idflieg aircraft designation system

Related development

- Friedrichshafen G.I
- Friedrichshafen G.II
- Friedrichshafen G.IV & V

Aircraft of comparable role, configuration, and era

- AEG G.V
- Gotha G.IV, G.V
- Handley Page O/400

== Bibliography ==
- Fredette, Raymond H. (1991). The Sky on Fire: the First Battle of Britain, 1917-1918. Washington D.C.: University of Alabama Press. ISBN 1-56098-016-8.
- Grosz, Peter M. (1995). Windsock datafile 51 : AEG G. IV. Berkhamsted: Albatros Productions. ISBN 0-948414-68-5.
- Grosz, Peter M. (1995). Windsock datafile 65 : Friedrichshafen G.III / G.IIIa. Berkhamsted: Albatros Productions. ISBN 0-948414-97-9.
- Grosz, Peter M. (1995). Windsock datafile Special : Gotha!. Berkhamsted: Albatros Productions. ISBN 0-948414-57-X.
- Hallade, Jean (December 1977). "Quand les Gothas bombardaient Paris..." [When the Gothas Bombed Paris...]. Le Fana de l'Aviation (in French) (97): 28–30. ISSN 0757-4169.
- Herris, Jack (2016). Friedrichshafen Aircraft of WWI: A Centennial Perspective on Great War Airplanes. Great War Aviation Centennial Series. Vol. 21. Charleston, South Carolina: Aeronaut Books. ISBN 978-1-935881-35-3.
- Imrie, Alex (1971). Pictorial History of the German Army Air Service 1914-1918. Chicago.
- Klaauw, Bart van der (March–April 1999). "Unexpected Windfalls: Accidentally or Deliberately, More than 100 Aircraft 'arrived' in Dutch Territory During the Great War". Air Enthusiast (80): 54–59. ISSN 0143-5450.
