= Martin MB-1 =

American large biplane bomber

MB-1
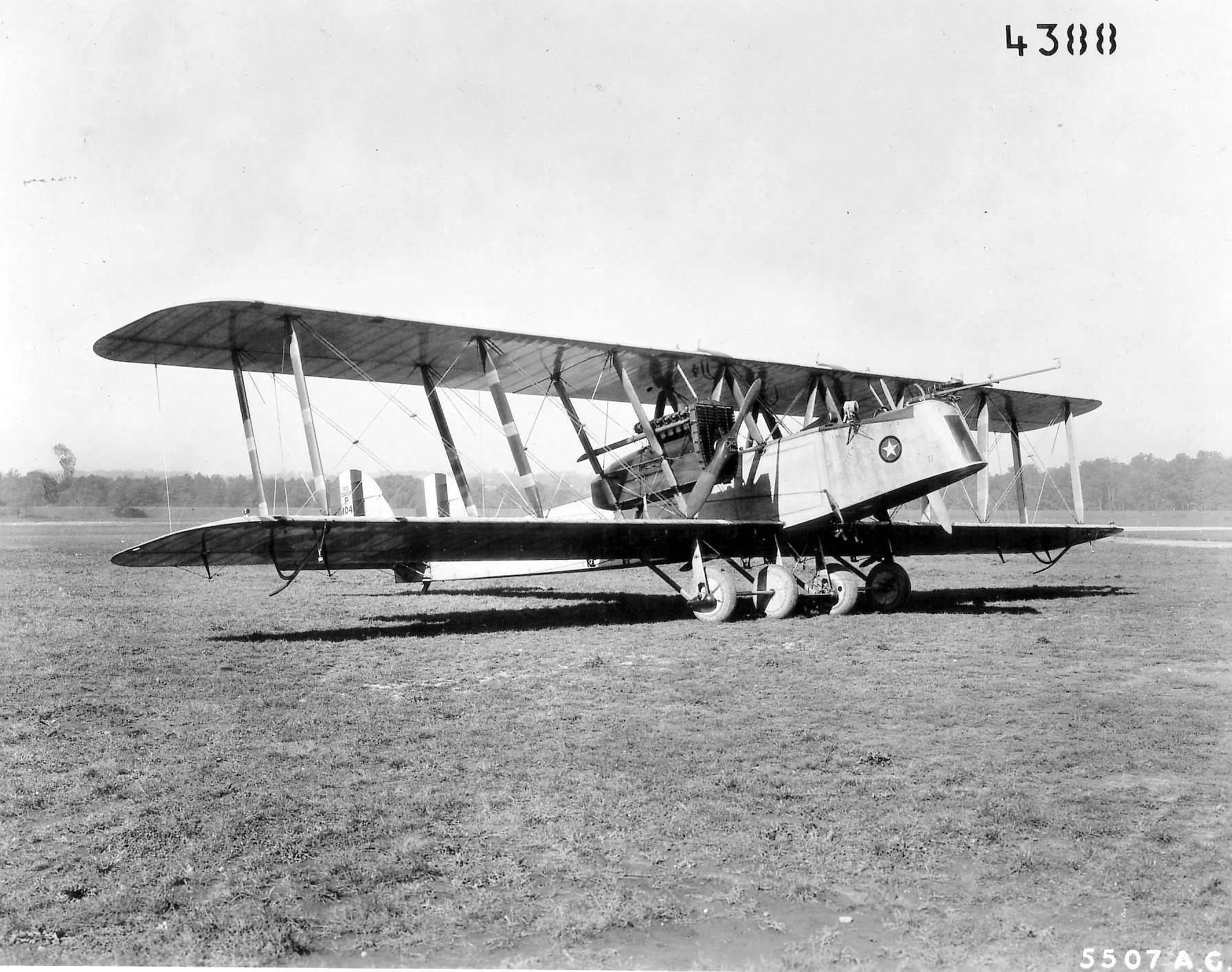
- Martin MB-1 GMB

General information
- Type: Large biplane bomber
- Manufacturer: Glenn L. Martin Company
- Designer: Donald Wills Douglas, Sr.
- Primary users: United States Army Air Service United States Navy; United States Marine Corps; United States Postal Service
- Number built: 20

History
- Introduction date: 1918
- First flight: 17 August 1918

The Martin MB-1 was an American large biplane bomber designed and built by the Glenn L. Martin Company for the United States Army Air Service in 1918. It was the first purpose-built bomber produced by the United States.

In 1921 Martin produced its KG.1 variant of the MB-1, with ten purchased by the Navy as torpedo bombers under the designation MBT. After two were purchased, the designation was changed to Martin MT.

== Development ==
In response to a requirement from the Air Service for a bomber that was superior to the Handley Page O/400, Martin proposed the MB-1 and were rewarded with an initial production contract for six aircraft. The MB-1 was a conventional biplane design with twin fins and rudders mounted above the tailplane and a fixed tailwheel landing gear with four-wheel main gear. Powered by two 400 hp (298 kW) Liberty 12A engines, it had room for a crew of three in open cockpits.

== Operational history ==
Initial delivery to the Air Service was in October 1918, with the aircraft designated GMB for Glenn Martin Bomber. The first four produced were configured as observation aircraft, and the next two as bombers. Four others were produced before the end of World War I cancelled all remaining war contracts. The last three aircraft each were configured experimentally, with separate designations: GMT (Glenn Martin Transcontinental), a long-range version with a 1,500 mi (2,400 km) range; GMC (Glen Martin Cannon) with a nose-mounted 37 mm (1.46 in) cannon; and GMP (Glenn Martin Passenger) as an enclosed ten-passenger transport. The GMP was later redesignated T-1. Six surviving aircraft were later modified and used by the United States Post Office Department as mail carriers. The design was the basis for the Martin MB-2, which had a greater load capability but was slower and less maneuverable.

Ten aircraft were used by the United States Navy from 1922 under the designations MBT and MT and were used as torpedo bombers, two by the Navy and eight by Marine Corps squadron VF-2M. On 5 October 1923, the Marine Corps entered an MT, serial number A-5720, in the National Air Races in St. Louis. The aircraft raced with the racing number 58, placing third on the 160 nautical miles; 190 miles (300 km) course.

They were used in the West Virginian Coal Wars, notably in the Battle of Blair Mountain, as bombers and aerial observers sent in by President Warren Harding. One aircraft was lost, crashing on the return flight, with the loss of three crewmen.

== Variants ==
MB-1
Company and original military designation.
GMB
Glenn Martin Bomber - Air Service designation for the MB-1 aircraft.
GMT
Glenn Martin Transcontinental - designation for one aircraft with long range fuel tanks.
GMC
Glenn Martin Cannon - designation for one cannon equipped aircraft.
GMP
Glenn Martin Passenger - designation for one ten-seat passenger variant, later designated T-1
MBT
Martin Bomber-Torpedo - United States Navy/Marine Corps torpedo-bomber variant, two built.
MT
Martin Torpedo - United States Navy/Marine Corps version with an MB-1 fuselage and MB-2 wings, eight built, later designated the TM-1
T-1
GMP redesignated.
TM-1
MT redesignated.

== Operators ==
United States

- United States Army Air Service
- United States Marine Corps
- United States Navy
- United States Post Office Department

== Specifications ==
Data from United States Military Aircraft since 1909

General characteristics

- Crew: three (pilot, bombardier, gunner)
- Length: 44 ft 10 in (13.67 m)
- Wingspan: 71 ft 5 in (21.77 m)
- Height: 14 ft 7 in (4.45 m)
- Wing area: 1,070 sq ft (99.4 m^{2})
- Empty weight: 6,702 lb (3,040 kg)
- Gross weight: 10,225 lb (4,638 kg)
- Powerplant: 2 × Liberty 12A liquid-cooled V-12 , 400 hp (298 kW) each

Performance

- Maximum speed: 105 mph (169 km/h, 91 kn)
- Cruise speed: 92 mph (148 km/h, 80 kn)
- Range: 390 mi (628 km, 340 nmi)
- Service ceiling: 10,300 ft (3,100 m)
- Rate of climb: 630 ft/min (3.2 m/s)

Armament

- Five .30-cal. machine guns
- 1,040 lb (470 kg) of bombs
