= List of seaplane carriers of the Royal Navy =

This is a list of Royal Navy seaplane carriers.

== Key ==
Main guns	The number and type of the main battery guns
Displacement	Ship displacement at full combat load
Propulsion	Number of shafts, type of propulsion system, and top speed generated
Service	The dates work began and finished on the ship and its ultimate fate
Laid down	The date the keel began to be assembled
Commissioned	The date the ship was commissioned

== Ships ==
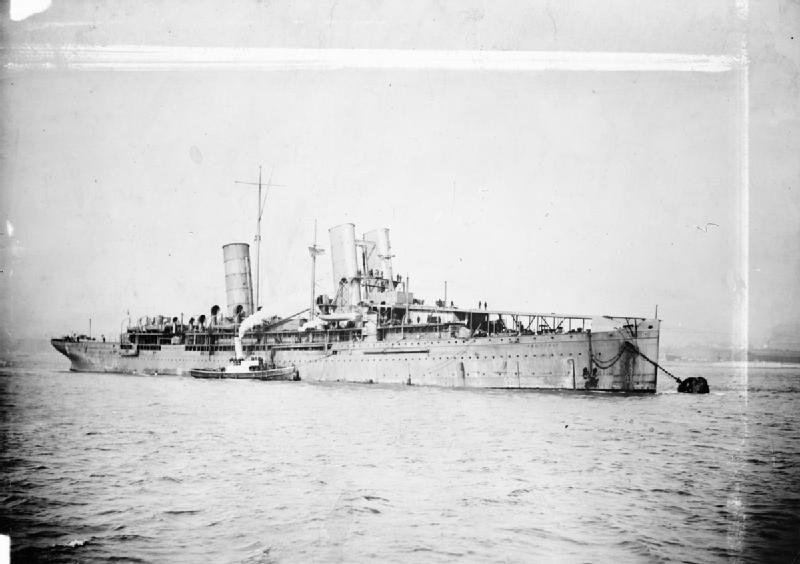
HMS Campania

Ship	Aircraft	Displacement	Propulsion	Service		
Ship	Aircraft	Displacement	Propulsion	Laid down	Commissioned	Fate
HMS Ark Royal	9	7,450 long tons (7,570 t)	2 shafts Brown-Curtis geared turbines 6 boilers	7 November 1913	December 1914	Sold December 1946 for conversion to a merchant ship.
HMS Empress	3	2,540 long tons (2,581 t)	3 shafts Parsons turbines	1906	25 August 1914	Returned to owners November 1919
HMS Engadine	4	1,676 long tons (1,703 t)	2 shafts Steam turbine	1910	13 August 1914	Sold back to original owners 1919.
HMS Riviera	4	1,850 long tons (1,880 t)	3 shafts Parsons turbines 6 boilers	1910	11 August 1914	Returned to owners 1919
HMS Campania	10	18,000 long tons (18,289 t)	2 shafts Steam engines	1892	17 April 1915	Sank during a gale, 5 November 1918
HMS Anne	2	4,083 long tons (4,149 t)	1 shaft	1911	4 August 1915	Returned to owners 1922
HMS Raven II	2	4,678 long tons (4,753 t)	1 shaft	1911	12 June 1915	Sold for mercantile service 1923
HMS Ben-my-Chree	6	3,880 long tons (3,942 t)	3 shafts Steam turbines 3 boilers	1907	3 March 1915	Sunk on 11 January 1917 by shore-based Turkish artillery fire.
HMS Vindex	7	2,950 long tons (2,997 t)	3 shafts Steam turbines 4 boilers	1916	1 October 1918	Scrapped 1948
HMS Manxman	8	2,540 long tons (2,581 t)	2 shafts Brown-Curtis geared turbines	1903	17 April 1916	Sold for Scrap 9 August 1949
HMS Nairana	7	3,547 long tons (3,604 t)	2 shafts Parsons geared turbines	1914	25 August 1917	Sold 1920
HMS Pegasus	9	2,540 long tons (2,581 t)	2 shafts Brown-Curtis geared turbines	1914	28 August 1917	
HMS Albatross	9	6,350 long tons (6,452 t)	2 shafts Steam turbines 4 boilers	5 May 1926	19 April 1938	
HMS Vindictive	12	11,500 long tons (11,685 t)	4 shafts Parsons turbines 12 boilers	29 June 1916	1 October 1918	Sold for scrap February 1946

== See also ==
- HMS M2 – M-class submarine converted to carry a seaplane in 1927
