= HMS Anne (1915) =

British seaplane carrier

- HMS Anne, note the two seaplanes on either side of the rear cargo booms and the gun on the quarterdeck

History

Germany
- Name: SS Aenne Rickmers
- Builder: Rickmers, Bremerhaven, Germany
- Launched: 16 February 1911
- Completed: 1911

United Kingdom
- Name: SS Aenne Rickmers
- Acquired: August 1914
- Commissioned: 5 August 1915
- Decommissioned: 8 August 1917
- In service: January 1915
- Renamed: HMS Anne, 5 August 1915
- Reclassified: Merchant collier, 29 January 1918
- Fate: Sold, 1922

Greece
- Acquired: 1922
- Renamed: Ithaki
- Fate: Sold, 1939

Romania
- Name: SS Itahki
- Acquired: 1939
- Renamed: Moldova
- Fate: Transferred to Panamanian registry, 1942

Panama
- Name: SS Moldova
- Acquired: 1942
- Fate: Sold to Wallen & Company, 1949

Panama
- Name: SS Moldova
- Owner: Wallen & Company
- Acquired: 1949
- Renamed: Jagrahat, 1954
- Fate: Scrapped, 8 November 1958
- Notes: Renamed Moldova, 1955

General characteristics
- Type: Seaplane carrier
- Tonnage: 4,083 gross register tons (GRT)
- Length: 367 ft 1 in (111.89 m)
- Beam: 47 ft 7 in (14.50 m)
- Draught: 27 ft 3 in (8.31 m)
- Propulsion: 1 shaft; 1 Triple-expansion steam engine
- Speed: 11 knots (20 km/h; 13 mph)
- Armament: 1 × 12-pounder gun
- Aircraft carried: 2 × seaplanes

HMS Anne was a seaplane carrier of the Royal Navy used during the First World War. Converted from the captured German freighter Aenne Rickmers, the ship's two aircraft conducted aerial reconnaissance, observation and bombing missions in the Eastern Mediterranean and Red Sea during 1915–17 even though the ship was not commissioned into the Royal Navy until mid-1915. She was decommissioned in late 1917 and became a Merchant Navy collier for the last year of the war. Anne was sold off in 1922 and had a succession of owners and names until she was scrapped in 1958.

== Description ==
Anne was 367 feet 1 inch (111.89 m) long, had a beam of 47 feet 7 inches (14.5 m), and a draught of 27 feet 3 inches (8.31 m). She was rated at 4,083 gross register tons (GRT). The ship had one propeller shaft powered by one triple-expansion steam engine that used steam generated by an unknown number of coal-fired boilers. Anne had a maximum speed of 11 knots (20 km/h; 13 mph).

== Career ==
The merchant ship SS Aenne Rickmers was built by Rickmers of Bremerhaven in 1911. On the outbreak of war in August 1914, she was seized whilst in Port Said, Egypt and was requisitioned for service under the Red Ensign of the British Merchant Marine in January 1915 to operate seaplanes. No special modifications were made to the ship; the aircraft were stowed on the aft hatch covers and handled with her cargo booms. Aenne Rickmers operated two French Nieuport VI.H floatplanes that had been off-loaded by the French seaplane carrier Foudre; they were flown by French pilots with British observers.

For the first two months of 1915, the ship and her aircraft supported Allied operations in Syria, Palestine and the Sinai Peninsula. Aside from reconnaissance duties, they delivered and recovered Allied agents as well as observed for ships performing coastal bombardments. On 4 March, Aenne Rickmers was ordered to join several Allied ships that were going to bombard Smyrna, Turkey. A week later, she was torpedoed by the Turkish torpedo boat Demir Hisar. The ship was hit by one torpedo in the Number 1 cargo hold; this was full of timber which limited water ingress and saved her from sinking. Aenne Rickmers arrived at Mudros the following day to begin repairs, but the repair crew was withdrawn a week later to work on the damaged battlecruiser HMS Inflexible. The seaplane carrier HMS Raven II (another merchant conversion) arrived on 20 March to load her aircraft and crew, leaving only a five-person skeleton crew behind. During a storm on 6 April, the ship dragged her anchors and ran aground on a sandy beach. She was temporarily repaired there and refloated on 12 May, sailing to Alexandria, Egypt two days later for permanent repairs and to off-load her cargo. This was completed by 18 June, but the ship lay idle until the end of the month when she was provided with an Arab crew and sailed to Port Said.

Aenne Rickmers rendezvoused with the French armoured cruiser Jeanne d'Arc on 18 July at Scarpanto and the carrier searched the Turkish coast for U-boat bases and observed while the French ship bombarded coastal installations. The ship then returned to Port Said where she was fitted with a 12-pounder gun. Aenne Rickmers was commissioned into the Royal Navy on 5 August 1915 and renamed HMS Anne the same day. She rendezvoused with Jeanne d'Arc and the French pre-dreadnought battleship Jauréguiberry around 13 August and observed while they bombarded Turkish installations in Haifa. On 17 August, aircraft from both Anne and Raven II spotted for Jeanne d'Arc as she bombarded Tarsus and then assisted Jeanne d'Arc and Jauréguiberry on 30 August as they captured Ruad Island.

In early September, the ship assisted the French as they evacuated Armenian troops and civilians from Alexandretta and the surrounding area and then resumed her earlier work of reconnaissance and espionage. Anne lost her first aircraft when it suffered an engine failure whilst on a reconnaissance mission over Beersheba on 9 October. The ship had her bottom cleaned in Alexandria during November and lost another aircraft, again over Beersheba, on 22 December. In January 1916, she was assigned to the East Indies and Egypt Seaplane Squadron together with the carriers Empress, Ben-my-Chree and Raven II. The squadron was under the command of the General Officer Commanding, Egypt and its primary duty was to watch Turkish positions and movements in southern Palestine and the Sinai in early 1916. Around 17 April, Anne was attacked by two German aircraft, but was not damaged. A few days later, she discovered a U-boat base at Makry, whilst operating near Kastellorizo. The ship loaded aboard the French seaplane contingent in Egypt at the end of the month, and delivered it to Malta on 9 May for transfer, including her own Nieuports, to the French seaplane carrier Campinas. Her aircraft had made a total of 118 flights since she began operating them in January 1915 and only two had been lost.

Later that month, Anne exchanged her existing 12-pounder for an anti-aircraft gun of the same calibre and was back at Port Said by 21 May. She lay idle there until mid-June when she began transporting military supplies between Port Said and several ports in the Red Sea. This lasted until 2 August when she embarked British seaplanes, including Short Type 184, Sopwith Schneider and Baby floatplanes, and she observed for the French cruiser Pothuau on 10 August as the latter ship bombarded Mersina. The East Indies and Egypt Squadron reassembled in late August with Raven II, Anne and Ben-my-Chree and the aircraft from the three carriers attacked the Turkish supply dump at El Afule for thirty minutes. The squadron then steamed south along the Palestinian coast where they encountered two Turkish supply dhows. One was sunk by the escorting French destroyer Arbalete while the other was captured. The squadron flew off seven aircraft that attacked an encampment at Bureir and a nearby railroad viaduct. One of Anne's seaplanes was lost during this mission and the pilot was captured. Despite the loss, her aircraft bombed Turkish installations at Tull Keram, Nablus, Ludd and Ramleh before returning to Port Said on 27 August.

A few days later, Anne replaced Raven II, after that ship had been damaged by an air attack on 1 September, on an expedition into the Red Sea to support the Arab Revolt against the Turks. She rendezvoused with the elderly cruiser HMS Fox and Dufferin of the Royal Indian Marine (RIM) and they arrived at Rabigh on 9 September. The ship briefly ran aground off Yenbo, but got off and was able to observe for Fox and Hardinge of the RIM as they shelled Turkish positions near Wejh on 13 September. Aside one brief visit to Suez to recoal, Anne remained in the area while her aircraft flew bombing and reconnaissance missions until she was relieved by Raven II on 26 October. The ship was idle at Port Said for the rest of the year other than one trip to Cyprus transporting coal. In January 1917, Anne returned to the Red Sea and joined Hardinge and the Armed boarding steamer Suva. Together with some 500 Arabs, the crews of the three ships made an amphibious landing and captured Wejh. The ship returned to Suez on 27 January and seems to have been used only as a collier until she was paid off on 8 August.

=== Commercial service ===
Anne served as a collier under the Red Ensign from 29 January 1918 until the end of the war under the management of F. C. Strick and Co. She was sold in 1922 to S.N. Vlassopoulos of Greece and was renamed Ithaki. The ship was sold to a Romanian company in 1939 and renamed Moldova; she was then transferred to Panamanian registry in 1942 with the same name. Moldova was sold in 1949 to Wallem & Co. and renamed Jagharat in 1954. She resumed her former name of Moldova in 1955 and arrived at Hong Kong to be scrapped on 8 November 1958.
