= HMS Raven II =

British seaplane carrier

History

Germany
- Name: SS Rabenfels
- Owner: Hansa
- Builder: Swan Hunter & Wigham Richardson, Wallsend
- Launched: 5 November 1903
- Completed: December 1903

United Kingdom
- Name: SS Rabenfels
- Acquired: August 1914
- Commissioned: 12 June 1915
- Decommissioned: Late 1917
- Renamed: Raven II, 5 August 1915
- Reclassified: Merchant collier, January 1918
- Fate: Transferred to Merchant Navy, January 1918

United Kingdom
- Name: SS Rabenfels
- Acquired: January 1918
- Renamed: Ravenrock, 1918
- Fate: Sold to British Dominion Steamship Co., 1923; resold to Karafuto KKK, 1923

Japan
- Name: SS Ravenrock
- Owner: Karafuto KKK
- Acquired: 1923
- Renamed: Heiyei Maru No. 7
- Fate: Sold to Inuri KKK, 1935

Japan
- Name: SS Heiyei Maru No. 7
- Owner: Inuri KKK
- Acquired: 1935
- Renamed: Heiei Maru No. 7, 1938
- Fate: Sunk, 1941–45

General characteristics
- Type: Seaplane carrier
- Tonnage: 4,706 GRT
- Length: 394 ft 5 in (120.2 m)
- Beam: 51 ft 6 in (15.7 m)
- Draught: 27 ft 6 in (8.4 m)
- Propulsion: 1 shaft; 1 Quadruple-expansion steam engine
- Speed: 10 knots (19 km/h; 12 mph)
- Armament: 1 × 76 mm (3.0 in) gun
- Aircraft carried: 1–6 × seaplanes

HMS Raven II was a seaplane carrier of the Royal Navy used during the First World War. Converted from the captured German freighter Rabenfels, the ship's aircraft conducted aerial reconnaissance, observation and bombing missions in the Eastern Mediterranean and Red Sea during 1915–17 even though the ship was not commissioned into the Royal Navy until mid-1915. She fruitlessly searched the Indian Ocean for the German commerce raider Wolf in mid-1917. Raven II was decommissioned in late 1917 and became a Merchant Navy collier for the last year of the war. She was sold off in 1923 and had a succession of owners and names until she was sunk during the Second World War while under Japanese ownership.

== Description ==
Raven II was 394 feet 5 inches (120.22 m) long, had a beam of 51 feet 6 inches (15.7 m), and a draught of 27 feet 6 inches (8.38 m). She was rated at 4,706 GRT. The ship had one propeller shaft powered by one quadruple-expansion steam engine that used steam generated by an unknown number of coal-fired boilers. Raven II had a maximum speed of 10 knots (19 km/h; 12 mph).

== Career ==
The German freighter SS Rabenfels was built by Swan Hunter & Wigham Richardson and completed in December 1903. On the outbreak of war in August 1914, she was seized by the British authorities whilst in Port Said, Egypt and was requisitioned for service under the Red Ensign in January 1915 to operate seaplanes. No special modifications were made to the ship; the aircraft were stowed on the aft hatch covers and handled with her cargo booms. Aenne Rickmers operated two French Nieuport VI.H floatplanes that had been off-loaded by the Foudre; they were flown by French pilots with British observers. Later, the ship operated included British Short Type 184, Sopwith Schneider, Sopwith Baby and Short Admiralty Type 827 floatplanes.

For the first two months of 1915, the ship and her aircraft supported Allied operations in Syria, Palestine and the Sinai Peninsula. Aside from reconnaissance duties, they delivered and recovered Allied spies as well as observed for ships performing coastal bombardments. Around 20 March, Rabenfels arrived in Mudros to load the aircraft and crew of the damaged Aenne Rickmers (later HMS Anne). The ship was commissioned into the Royal Navy on 12 June 1915 and renamed HMS Raven II. On 17 August, both Anne and Raven II spotted for the French armoured cruiser Jeanne d'Arc as she bombarded Tarsus. In January 1916, she was assigned to the East Indies and Egypt Seaplane Squadron together with the carriers Empress, Ben-my-Chree and Anne. The squadron was under the command of the General Officer Commanding, Egypt and its primary duty was to watch Turkish positions and movements in southern Palestine and the Sinai in early 1916.

At the end of March, Raven II was sent to the Red Sea to attack Turkish troops threatening Aden; she carried one two-seat Short floatplane and five Sopwith Schneiders for this operation. After a preliminary reconnaissance mission, on 2–3 April her aircraft dropped ninety-one 20-pound (9.1 kg) bombs as well as leaflets urging the Arab auxiliaries to desert. The ship returned to the Syrian coast for patrols and was transferred to Kastellorizo in early July to conduct aerial reconnaissance and bombing missions in that area. Raven II was transferred to the Gulf of Aqaba later that month to take aerial photographs of the head of gulf as well as the east coast of the Red Sea. Her aircraft observed for the monitor M21 as she bombarded a Turkish encampment in the Sinai. One aircraft was forced to land, but it was taken in tow by the monitor and delivered back to Raven II.

The East Indies and Egypt Squadron reassembled in late August with Raven II, Anne and Ben-my-Chree and the aircraft from the three carriers attacked the Turkish supply dump at El Afule for thirty minutes. The squadron then steamed south along the Palestinian coast where they encountered two Turkish supply dhows. One was sunk by the escorting Arbalète while the other was captured. The squadron flew off seven aircraft that attacked an encampment at Bureir and a nearby railroad viaduct. Raven II was then sent to the Adalia area on the Turkish coast where her aircraft bombed a factory at Fineka and searched for U-boat bases On 1 September, the ship was in Port Said preparing for another sortie into the Red Sea when she was hit by a bomb dropped by a German aircraft (probably the first successful air attack on an aviation vessel). Although Raven II was only lightly damaged, Anne was sent in her place. Raven II relieved Anne on 26 October in the Red Sea and her aircraft bombed Turkish forces advancing on Rabigh and Yenbo on 10 December. Shortly afterwards, the ship was transferred back to the Eastern Mediterranean where her aircraft attacked a bridge over the Ceyhan River with one 65-pound (29 kg) bomb and eight 16-pound (7.3 kg) bombs on 27 December.

On 10 March 1917, Raven II and the Pothuau sailed for the Indian Ocean to hunt for the German Q-ship Wolf. For this mission she carried a Short Baby and two Short 184s. The two ships searched the Laccadive Islands en route to Colombo, Ceylon, which they reached on 2 April. They then searched the Chagos Archipelago and the Maldive Islands and returned to Colombo. Engine problems forced a Short 184 to make an emergency landing on 21 April in the Maldives; the crew rejoined the ship on 6 May after a series of adventures that inspired Rudyard Kipling's story "A Flight of Fact". Raven II recovered the floatplane and its aircraft continued to fly search missions from Colombo until 21 May. She then joined a convoy bound for Egypt and arrived back in Port Said on 10 June. In early November, the ship's aircraft observed fire for a variety of ships during the Third Battle of Gaza.

=== Commercial service ===
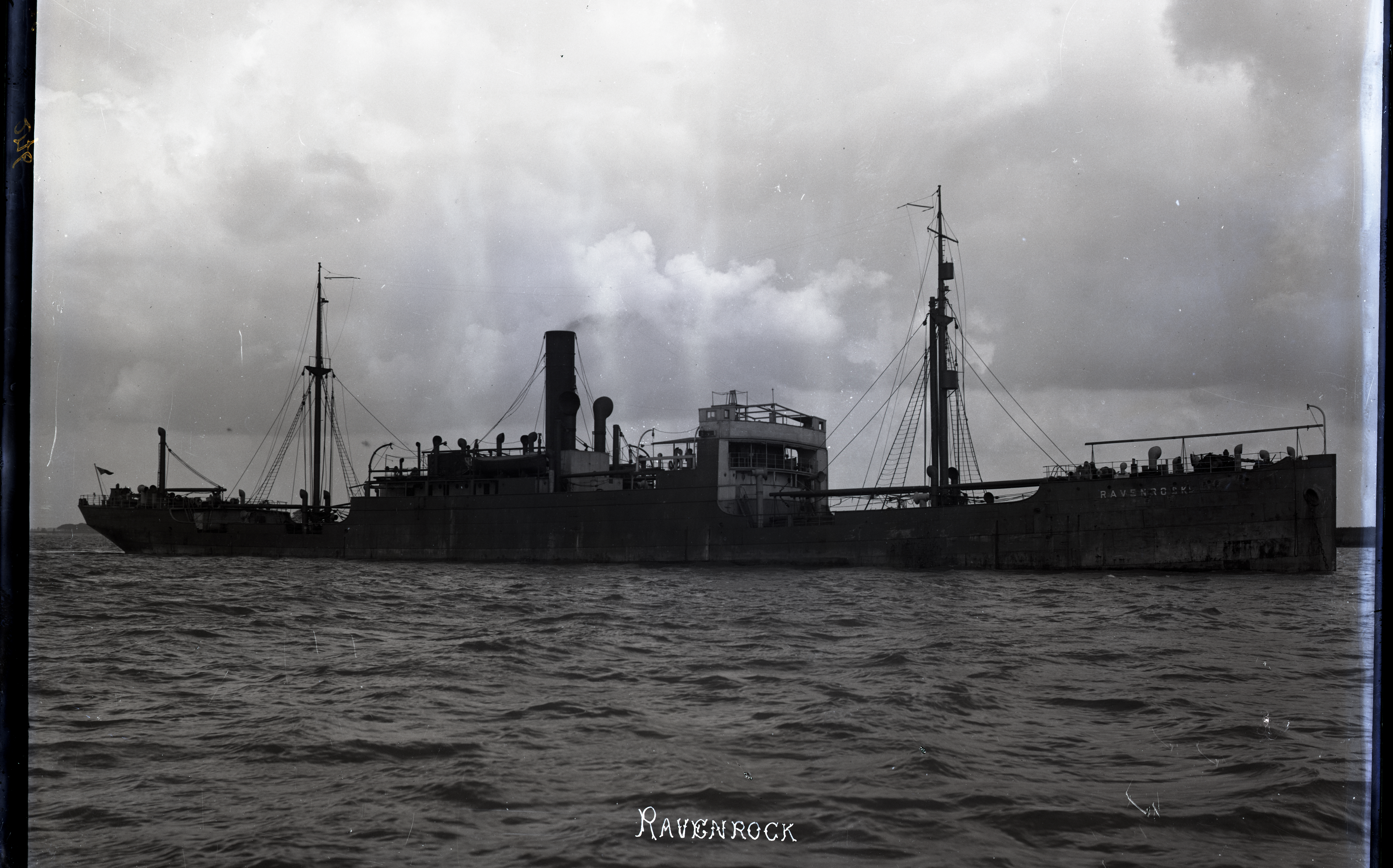
Ravenrock

HMS Raven II was paid off shortly afterwards and, renamed Ravenrock, served as a collier under the Red Ensign from January 1918 until the end of the war under the management of Grahams & Co. She was sold to British Dominion Steamship Co. in 1923 and resold later that year to Karafuto Kisen Kabushiki Kaisha (KKK), which renamed her Heiyei Maru No. 7. In 1935, the ship was sold to Inuri KKK and she was renamed Heiei Maru No. 7 in 1938. The ship was sunk during the Second World War on 12 January 1945 by US airplane attacks of Mekong mouth of position 10.46 N 106.42 E.
