= Charles Edmonds =

Royal Air Force Air Vice-Marshal (1891-1954)

Charles Humphrey Kingsman Edmonds
- Born: 20 April 1891; Lincoln, Lincolnshire, England
- Died: 26 September 1954 (aged 63); Surrey, England
- Spouse: Lorna Karim Chadwick Osborn
- Military career
- Allegiance: United Kingdom
- Branch: Royal Navy (1903–18); Royal Air Force (1918–45)
- Service years: 1903–45
- Rank: Air Vice Marshal
- Nickname: Chum
- Commands: No. 21 Group (1931–32); RAF Worthy Down (1929–31); No. 6 Wing RNAS (1917–18)
- Conflicts: First Balkan War; First World War; Cuxhaven Raid; Gallipoli Campaign; Second World War
- Awards: Commander of the Order of the British Empire; Distinguished Service Order; Mentioned in Despatches (2); Croix de guerre (France); Officer of the Order of the Crown of Italy; Commander's Cross with Star of the Order of Polonia Restituta (Poland); Commander of the Legion of Merit (United States)

Air Vice Marshal Charles Humphrey Kingsman Edmonds, CBE, DSO (20 April 1891 – 26 September 1954) was an air officer of the Royal Air Force (RAF).

He first served in the Royal Navy and was a naval aviator during the First World War, taking part in the Cuxhaven Raid in December 1914; and while serving in the Gallipoli Campaign (1915) he was the first man to sink an enemy ship from an aircraft, using a torpedo.

In the interbellum he remained in the RAF, becoming a senior staff officer during the Second World War.

== Early life ==
In 1903, at the age of 14, Edmonds joined the Royal Navy as cadet. On 15 July 1911 he was promoted from midshipman to sub-lieutenant, serving aboard the battleship HMS King Edward VII from 10 October 1911, taking part in blockade operations during the First Balkan War.

Edmonds then learned to fly at the Bristol School at Larkhill on Salisbury Plain, being granted Royal Aero Club Aviators' Certificate No. 206 on 16 April 1912 after soloing a Bristol Biplane. On 17 February 1913 he was promoted to lieutenant. On 17 May 1913 he was posted to the Central Flying School for a course of instruction, then on 13 August was posted to Calshot Naval Air Station. He served in the Naval Wing of the Royal Flying Corps until 1 July 1914, when it became the Royal Naval Air Service.

== First World War ==
In late 1914 Edmonds took part in the Cuxhaven Raid. On 24 December 1914, under the command of Commodore Reginald Tyrwhitt, the light cruisers HMS Arethusa and Undaunted, together with eight destroyers of the 3rd Destroyer Flotilla, sailed from Harwich with the seaplane carriers HMS Engadine, Riviera and Empress, each carrying three Short seaplanes. Two destroyers and ten submarines under the command of Commodore Roger Keyes acted as escort. At 0600 on 25 December the force was in a position 12 nautical miles (22 km) north of Heligoland and the seven of the seaplanes were successfully launched by 0700. Their principal objective was to attack the airship sheds at Cuxhaven, but were also tasked with reconnoitring the naval base at Wilhelmshaven. Poor weather over the land meant that none of the aircraft found their objective, but a thorough survey of German naval installations was made, and a number of bombs dropped on various targets. While the British aircraft flew over Germany, the naval force cruised off the enemy coast awaiting their return. Intercepted radio traffic showed that the Germans were well aware of their presence, but remarkably their navy made no attempt to interfere. Attacks were made by a number of German seaplanes and two Zeppelins, but were driven off by British fire. Only three aircraft (Edmonds among them) managed to return to the fleet, while three others ran low on fuel and were obliged to come down at sea near Nordeney, where they were picked up by the submarine HMS E11. The seventh pilot also came down on the sea after suffering an engine failure and was picked up by Dutch trawler, and taken to Holland, before eventually returning to England. Following the raid Edmonds was awarded the Distinguished Service Order. On 25 March 1915 he was promoted to flight commander, with seniority from 23 February, and served aboard HMS Raven II in the Mediterranean and Aden.

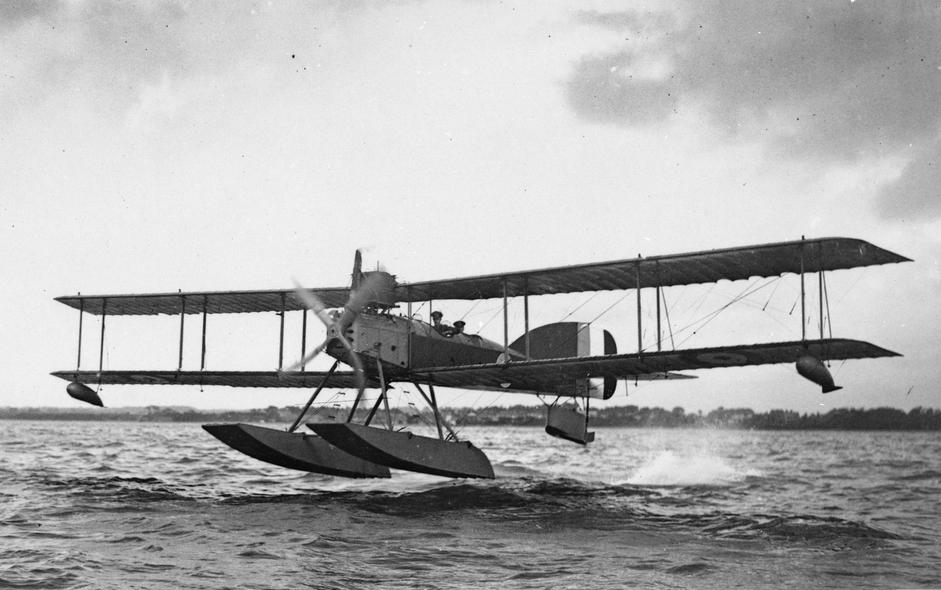
Short 184 torpedo bomber, 1915

He then served aboard the seaplane carrier HMS Ben-my-Chree during the Gallipoli Campaign. On 12 August 1915, flying a Short 184 seaplane, he made history by launching the first ever aerial torpedo attack on a Turkish merchant ship. It subsequently sank, although it had already been hit by the British submarine HMS E14. Five days later, he successfully attacked another Turkish ship, the first to have been sunk entirely by this method.

While flying Short Type 184 No. 849 on 11 February 1916, he suffered an engine failure and on landing on a heavy sea, the aircraft capsized. Edmonds and his observer (Lieutenant Erskine Childers, the author of The Riddle of the Sands) were rescued by HMT Charlsen. On 14 March 1916 he received a mention in despatches from the Vice Admiral Commanding the Eastern Mediterranean Squadron covering operations between the time of the landing on the Gallipoli Peninsula in April 1915, and the evacuation in December 1915 – January 1916. On 5 May 1916 Edmonds was posted to HMS President, for Special Service in the RNAS. On 30 June 1916 he was promoted to squadron commander, eventually becoming Officer Commanding, No. 6 Wing RNAS, based at Otranto on 13 March 1917. He was promoted to wing commander on 31 December 1917.

On 1 April 1918, the Royal Naval Air Service (RNAS) was merged with the Army's Royal Flying Corps to form the Royal Air Force. The same day Edmonds, now holding the rank of major (temporary lieutenant colonel) was appointed a Staff Officer, 1st Class, to serve in the Air Ministry. Shortly after, on 17 April, he was granted permission by the King to wear the Croix de guerre that had been conferred by the President of the French Republic.

== Interbellum ==
Edmonds received further awards after the war. On 1 January 1919 he was made an Officer of the Order of the British Empire, and on 8 February was granted permission to wear the insignia of an Officer of the Order of the Crown of Italy. On 1 April 1919 Edmonds, now a lieutenant colonel (acting brigadier general), left the staff, reverting to flying status. On 1 August 1919 he was awarded a permanent commission in the RAF with the rank of major (squadron leader).

After a period on half-pay, on 16 February 1920 Edmonds was appointed Officer Commanding, Storage Station, Brockworth, then on 1 May was appointed to serve on the staff of No. 7 Group. On 22 August 1921 he was transferred to the Air Ministry to serve in the Directorate of Training and Organisation, until 1 November 1921, when he was temporarily attached to the Air Pilotage School as a supernumerary officer before joining RAF Staff College as an instructor on 1 April 1922, having been promoted to wing commander on 1 January.

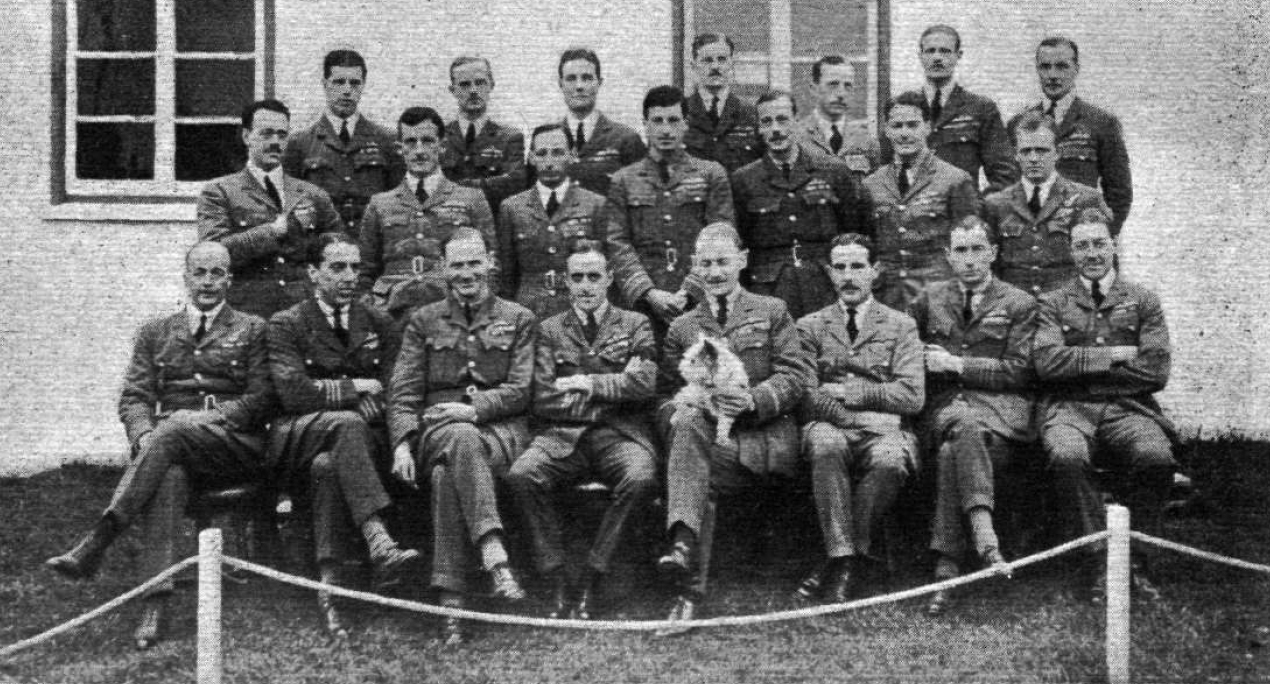
Staff and students at the first RAF Staff College course, 7 December 1922. (Edmonds, front row, 4th from right.)

Edmonds was one of the first instructors at the Staff College, which was opened under the command of Air Commodore Robert Brooke-Popham. The Directing Staff also included Air Commodore Robert Clark-Hall, Group Captain Philip Joubert de la Ferté, Wing Commander Wilfrid Freeman, and Squadron Leader Bertine Sutton, while the first class of students included Wing Commanders Jack Baldwin and Richard Peirse, Squadron Leaders Conway Pulford, Keith Park, Wilfred McClaughry and Charles Portal, and Flight Lieutenants Eric Betts, Harold Kerby and John Cole-Hamilton. Edmonds won the R. M. Groves Memorial Essay prize for his paper on A Forecast of Aerial Development in June 1922, and on 12 December 1923, by arrangement with the Royal Aeronautical Society, presented a paper before the Royal United Service Institution on the subject of Air Strategy.

On 4 May 1925 Edmonds was appointed Officer Commanding, Armament and Gunnery School, serving until 7 March 1927 when he was temporarily posted to the RAF Depot at Uxbridge, before being seconded for duty as the RAF Member of the British Naval Mission to Greece, serving there from 15 March 1927 until 15 March 1929. He then completed the Royal Navy Senior Officer's War Course, and was promoted to group captain on 1 July. On 6 August 1929 he was appointed Officer Commanding, RAF Worthy Down, and also won the R. M. Groves Memorial Essay prize for a second time.

He served as Officer Commanding, No. 21 (Training) Group from 7 August 1931, and on 1 February 1932 was posted to the Headquarters of No. 1 Air Defence Group, and attached to the Air Ministry (Deputy Directorate of Manning). On 1 March 1932 he was appointed Deputy Director of Manning. He also came third in the Gordon Shephard Memorial Essay competition. Edmonds then served the Directorate of Personal Services until 1 February 1938, when he transferred to the Deputy Directorate of Plans.

== Second World War ==
On 27 November 1939 Edmonds was appointed Senior Maintenance Staff Officer at the Headquarters of RAF Maintenance Command, and was promoted to the temporary rank of air commodore on 1 June 1941. Appointed acting air vice marshal on 18 May 1942, he then served as Senior Air Staff Officer at Combined Operations HQ from June, and then as Air Officer in Charge of Administration at Fighter Command HQ from 13 November 1942. In the 1943 New Year Honours Edmonds was made a Commander of the Order of the British Empire. On 18 May 1943 his temporary rank of air commodore was made war substantive. On 15 November 1943 he was appointed Air Officer in Charge of Administration at the Headquarters of the Allied Expeditionary Air Force. On 1 December 1944 he was promoted to air commodore, relinquishing his acting rank of air vice marshal on 15 December 1944. On 1 January 1945 he received a mention in despatches, and on 8 January was appointed Air Officer in Charge of Administration, RAF Flying Training Command, regaining his acting rank of air vice marshal.

On 12 June 1945 he received, from Poland, the Order of Polonia Restituta, Second Class, and again on 7 August relinquished his acting rank of air vice-marshal. Edmonds retired from the RAF, retaining the rank of air vice-marshal, on 3 October 1945. He was made a Commander of the Legion of Merit by the United States on 9 October.

== Personal life ==
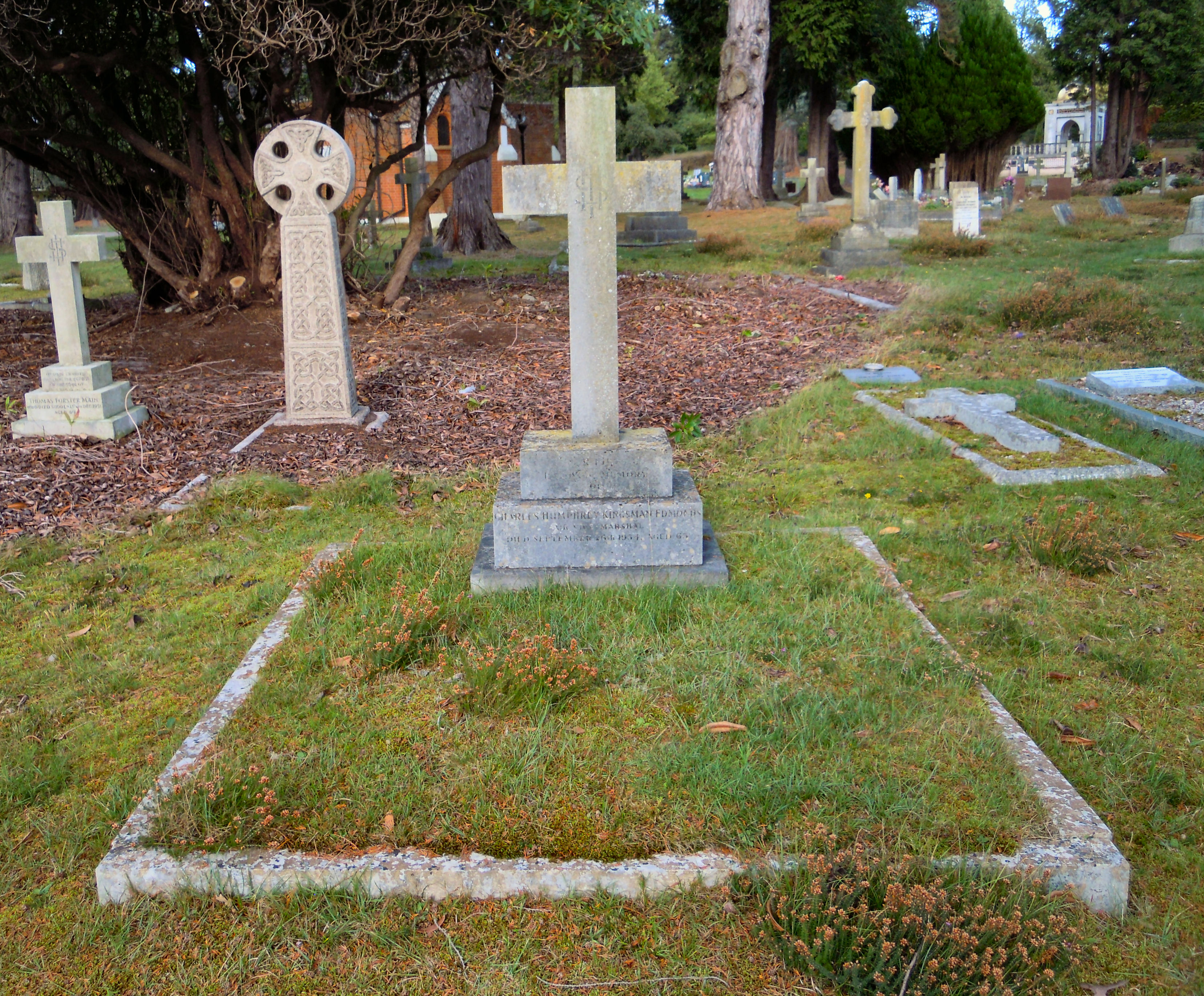
Edmonds' grave, Brookwood Cemetery

On 5 April 1917 Edmonds married Lorna Karim Chadwick Osborn, the daughter of Colonel Osborn, Royal Artillery, at the Church of St. John the Evangelist, Paddington. They had three children, including Robert Humphrey Gordon Edmonds, a diplomat and writer.

Charles Edmonds is buried in Brookwood Cemetery.
