= HMS Empress (1914) =

British seaplane carrier, 1907–1933

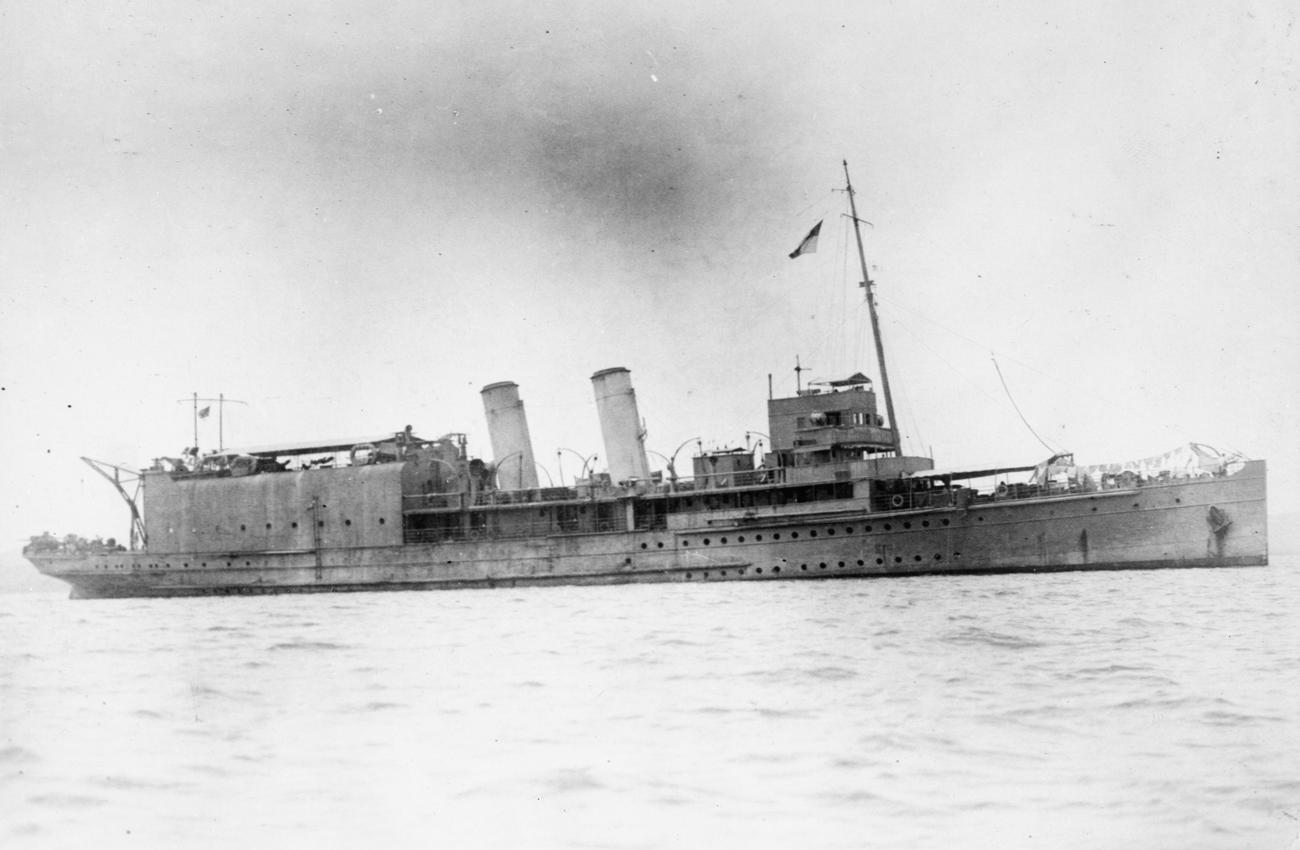
- Empress in 1918

History

United Kingdom
- Name: SS Empress
- Owner: South East and Chatham Railway
- Builder: William Denny and Brothers Dumbarton
- Laid down: 1906
- Launched: 13 April 1907
- Completed: 1907
- Fate: Leased to Royal Navy, August 1914

United Kingdom
- Name: HMS Empress
- Acquired: 11 August 1914
- Commissioned: 25 August 1914
- Out of service: November 1919
- Fate: Returned to owners, November 1919

United Kingdom
- Name: SS Empress
- Owner: South East and Chatham Railway/Southern Railway
- Acquired: November 1919
- Fate: Sold, 1923

France
- Name: SS Empress
- Owner: Société Anoynyme de Gérance et d'Armament
- Acquired: 1923
- Fate: Scrapped, 1933

General characteristics
- Type: Seaplane carrier
- Tonnage: 1,694 gross register tons (GRT)
- Displacement: 2,540 long tons (2,580 t)
- Length: 323 ft (98.5 m)
- Beam: 41 ft (12.5 m)
- Draught: 15 ft (4.6 m)
- Installed power: 11,000 shp (8,200 kW); 6 water-tube boilers
- Propulsion: 3 shafts; 3 steam turbines
- Speed: 18 knots (33 km/h; 21 mph)
- Range: 1,355 nmi (2,509 km; 1,559 mi) at 15 knots (28 km/h; 17 mph)
- Complement: about 200
- Armament: 4 × 76 mm (3.0 in) guns; 3 × QF 3 pounder Hotchkiss anti-aircraft guns
- Aircraft carried: 3–4 × seaplanes

HMS Empress was a seaplane carrier of the Royal Navy (RN) that served during the First World War. Converted from the Cross-Channel packet ship Empress, the ship's aircraft conducted aerial reconnaissance, observation and bombing missions in the North Sea and Eastern Mediterranean. During the last year of the war, she conducted anti-submarine patrols in the Mediterranean. Empress was returned to her owners in 1919 and was then sold to a French company in 1923. She was scrapped in 1933.

== Description ==
Empress had an overall length of 323 feet (98.5 m), a beam of 41 feet (12.5 m), and a draught of 15 feet (4.6 m). She displaced 2,540 long tons (2,580 t) and was rated at 1,694 gross register tons (GRT). Each of the ship's three sets of direct-drive steam turbines drove one propeller shaft. The ship's six boilers generated enough steam to produce 8,800 shaft horsepower (6,600 kW) from the turbines. The ship had a designed speed of 18 knots (33 km/h; 21 mph), but she made a speed of 22.26 knots (41.23 km/h; 25.62 mph) during her sea trials with 8,872 shaft horsepower (6,616 kW). Empress carried 425 tonnes (418 long tons) of coal, enough to give her a range of 1,355 nautical miles (2,509 km; 1,559 mi) at 15 knots (28 km/h; 17 mph).

== Service ==
Built as a fast packet for the South East and Chatham Railway Co., Empress was requisitioned for service during the First World War by the Admiralty on 11 August 1914, and was commissioned on 25 August. During that month, the ship transported equipment for the Eastchurch Squadron of the Royal Naval Air Service to Ostend, Belgium. Beginning on 30 August, she was converted by Chatham Dockyard to carry and operate three seaplanes. One aircraft was stowed forward and two aft, housed in canvas hangars, and handled with newly fitted cargo booms. During her career with the RN, the ship operated Fairey Hamble Baby, Short Admiralty Type 74, Short Type 184, Sopwith Schneider and Baby floatplanes. Two or three quick-firing (QF) two-pounder guns also were fitted at this time. Upon completion of the modifications on 30 September, Empress was assigned to the Harwich Force along with Engadine and Riviera. On Christmas Day 1914, nine aircraft from all three ships took part in the Cuxhaven Raid on hangars housing Zeppelin airships. Seven of the nine seaplanes successfully took off for the attack, but they inflicted little damage. Only three of the aircraft returned to be recovered, but the crews of the other three ditched safely and were recovered by a British submarine and the Dutch trawler Marta van Hattem.

From 9 May to 18 July 1915, the ship was modified by Cunard at Liverpool with a permanent, four-aircraft, hangar in the rear superstructure and a pair of cranes were mounted at the rear of the hangar to hoist the seaplanes in and out of the water. The 2-pounders were apparently removed during this refit and four QF 12-pounder 12 cwt guns, (Note: "Cwt" is the abbreviation for hundredweight, 12 cwt referring to the weight of the gun.) each with 130 rounds, and two Vickers QF 3-pounder anti-aircraft guns, each with 65 rounds, were fitted. Empress was transferred afterwards to Queenstown for the rest of the year, before moving to the Mediterranean. She arrived there in January 1916 and was assigned to the East Indies and Egypt Seaplane Squadron with the carriers Raven II, Anne, and Ben-my-Chree. The squadron was under the command of the General Officer Commanding, Egypt and its primary duty was watch and to attack Turkish positions and movements in southern Palestine and the Sinai in early 1916. In April, Empress was detached from the squadron to support operations off the Aegean coast of Bulgaria, where her aircraft observed for several naval bombardments. After a refit at Genoa, the ship rejoined the squadron and supported operations off the Syrian and Palestinian coasts until November. In January 1918, she was assigned anti-submarine duties, first at Port Said and later at Gibraltar.

She was returned to her owners in November 1919 and was sold to the Société Anoynyme de Gérance et d'Armament of France in 1923. On 12 January 1926, Empress collided with the British schooner John Gibson in the English Channel and sank her. Empress was scrapped in France in 1933.
