= Scout (aircraft) =

Class of military aircraft

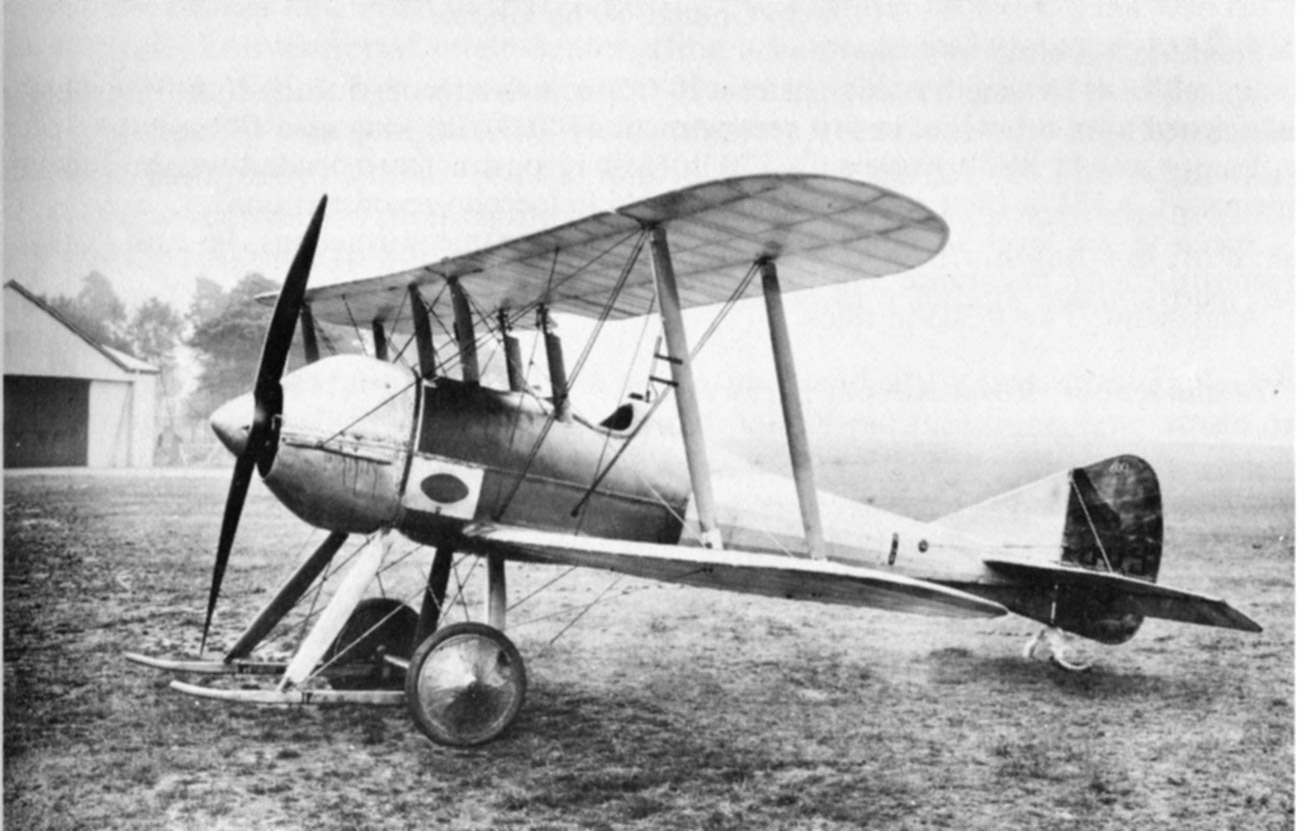
The S.E.2 in its final form at the Royal Aircraft Factory, Farnborough

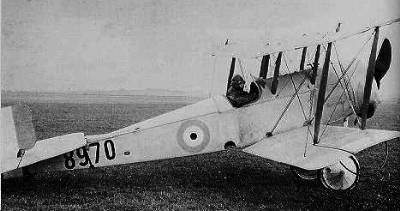
Bristol Scout

The term scout, as a description of a class of military aircraft, came into use shortly before the First World War, and initially referred to a fast (for its time), light (usually single-seated) unarmed reconnaissance aircraft. "Scout" types were generally adaptations of pre-war racing aircraft – although at least one (the Royal Aircraft Factory S.E.2) was specifically designed for the role. At this stage the possibility of air-to-air combat was considered highly speculative, and the speed of these aircraft relative to their contemporaries was seen as an advantage in gaining immunity from ground fire and in the ability to deliver timely reconnaissance reports.

Almost from the beginning of the war, various experiments were carried out in the fitting of armament to scouts to enable them to engage in air-to-air combat – by early 1916 several types of scout could fire a machine gun forwards, in the line of flight, thus becoming the first effective single-seat fighter aircraft – in effect, an entirely new class of aircraft. In French and German usage these types were termed "hunters" (chasseur, Jäger), but in the Royal Flying Corps and early Royal Air Force parlance "scout" remained the usual term for a single-seat fighter into the early 1920s. The term "fighter", or "fighting aircraft" was already current, but in this period referred specifically to a two-seater fighter such as the Sopwith 1½ Strutter or the Bristol Fighter.

This usage "scout" (or sometimes "fighting scout") for "single-seat fighter" can be found in many contemporary accounts, including fictional depictions of First World War air combat such as the Biggles books. These often refer to French or German "scouts" as well as British ones.

The usage also survives in some much later non-fictional writing on First World War aviation.

== Examples of scouts ==
The Royal Aircraft Factory identified some of the designs as "Scout Experimental"

- Royal Aircraft Factory S.E.5
- Royal Aircraft Factory S.E.6
- Royal Aircraft Factory S.E.7
