= HMIS Dufferin =

HMIS Dufferin was a troopship of 7,457 tonnes active with the Royal Indian Marine. The Dufferin was built to transport troops in south-east Asia and Africa.

== Service ==
During World War I, Dufferin was one of the British vessels sent on an expedition into the Red Sea to support the Arab Revolt against the Ottomans. She rendezvoused with HMS Anne and with the elderly cruiser HMS Fox they arrived at Rabigh on 9 September 1916.

At the Battle of Aqaba (6 July 1917) the forces of the Arab Revolt, advised by T. E. Lawrence ("Lawrence of Arabia"), captured the Red Sea port of Aqaba, and took 700 Ottoman prisoners of war (POW), including 42 officers. In the aftermath, Lawrence convinced Admiral Wemyss to send Dufferin to Aqaba with food, on the return trip taking the prisoners to be interned at a POW camp in Egypt.

== Sources ==
- Dittmar; Colledge. British Warships 1914–1919. p. 321.
- The Navy List. (December, 1914). p. 399c.
- The Navy List. (December, 1918). p. 954.
