= Royal Aircraft Factory S.E.7 =

S.E.6

General information
- Type: Scout aircraft
- National origin: United Kingdom
- Manufacturer: Royal Aircraft Factory
- Status: project only
- Number built: none

History
- Developed from: Royal Aircraft Factory S.E.6

The Royal Aircraft Factory S.E.7 was a proposed single-engined, single seat biplane designed at the Royal Aircraft Factory in First World War.

The S.E.7 used the same design and layout as the S.E.6 but differed in using a radial engine, the 14-cylinder R.A.F. 8.
