= East Indies and Egypt Seaplane Squadron =

Seaplane carrier formation of the Royal Navy

- White Ensign
- Active: 1916–1918
- Country: United Kingdom
- Allegiance: British Empire
- Branch: Royal Navy, Royal Naval Air Service
- Type: Squadron

Commanders
- Notable commanders: Squadron-Commander, Cecil L'Estrange Malone

The East Indies and Egypt Seaplane Squadron was a formation of seaplane carriers of the British Royal Navy. It was the Royal Navy's first carrier squadron from 1916 to 1918.

== History ==
The East Indies and Egypt Seaplane Squadron was formed in January 1916 consisting of the seaplane carriers HMS Raven II, HMS Empress, HMS Ben-my-Chree and HMS Anne, it was placed the command of Cecil L'Estrange Malone. The squadron, based at Port Said, was under the overall control of the Commander-in-Chief, East Indies and its primary responsibilities were to air-patrol Turkish troop positions including all movements in southern Palestine and the Sinai Peninsula. The squadron was disbanded in 1918.

=== Officer commanding ===
Included:

	Rank	Name	Term	Notes
Officer Commanding, East Indies and Egypt Seaplane Squadron
1	Squadron-Commander	Cecil L'Estrange Malone	January - May 1916	
1	Squadron-Commander	Charles Rumney Samson	May 1916 - December 1917	
