= French cruiser Pothuau =

Armored cruiser used from 1897 to 1926

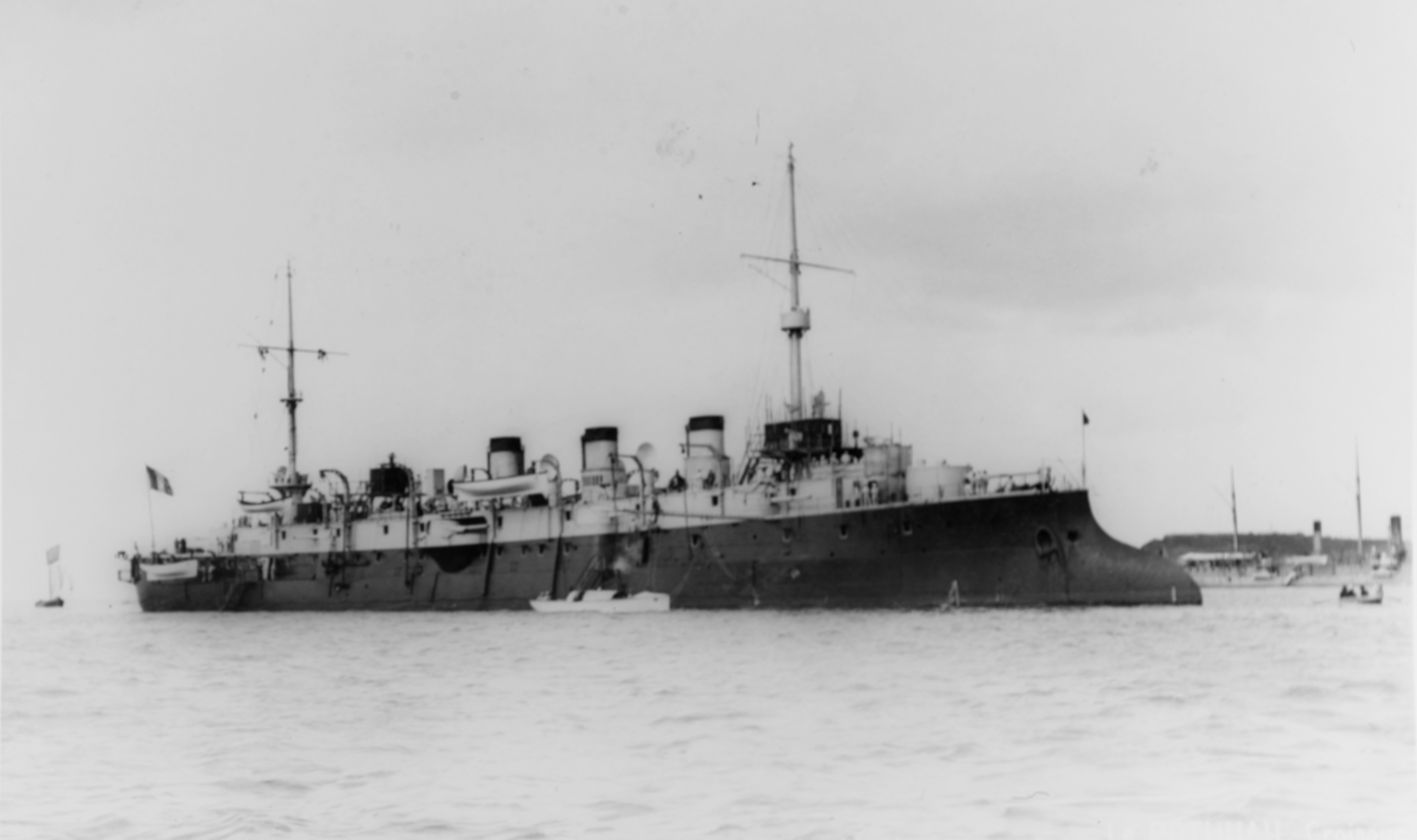
- Pothuau at anchor

Class overview
- Operators: French Navy
- Preceded by: Amiral Charner class
- Succeeded by: Jeanne d'Arc

History
- Name: Pothuau
- Namesake: Louis Pothuau
- Ordered: 11 April 1893
- Builder: Forges et Chantiers de la Méditerranée, Le Havre-Graville
- Cost: 11,156,422 francs
- Laid down: 25 May 1893
- Launched: 19 September 1895
- Completed: 9 July 1897
- Commissioned: 8 June 1897
- Decommissioned: 12 June 1926
- Stricken: 3 November 1927
- Fate: Sold for scrap, 25 September 1929

General characteristics
- Type: Armoured cruiser
- Displacement: 5,460 t (5,374 long tons)
- Length: 113.1 m (371 ft 1 in)
- Beam: 15.3 m (50 ft 2 in)
- Draught: 6.4 m (21 ft 0 in)
- Installed power: 18 Belleville boilers; 10,000 ihp (7,500 kW; 10,000 PS)
- Propulsion: 2 Shafts; 2 triple-expansion steam engines
- Speed: 19 knots (35 km/h; 22 mph)
- Range: 4,500 nmi (8,300 km; 5,200 mi) at 10 knots (19 km/h; 12 mph)
- Complement: 455 (490 as flagship)
- Armament: 2 × single 194 mm (7.6 in) guns; 10 × single 138.6 mm (5.5 in) guns; 12 × single 47 mm (1.9 in) guns; 8 × single 37 mm (1.5 in) guns; 4 × 450 mm (17.7 in) torpedo tubes
- Armour: Waterline belt: 52–80 mm (2.0–3.1 in); Deck: 55–105 mm (2.2–4.1 in); Gun turrets: 180 mm (7.1 in); Battery: 54 mm (2.1 in); Conning tower: 240 mm (9.4 in)

The French cruiser Pothuau was an armoured cruiser built for the French Navy (Marine Navale) in the 1890s. She spent most of her active career in the Mediterranean before becoming a gunnery training ship in 1906. The ship participated in the Kamerun campaign early in World War I before she was transferred to the Red Sea and the Indian Ocean in 1916 where she patrolled and escorted convoys. Pothuau fruitlessly searched the Indian Ocean for the German commerce raider Wolf in mid-1917. The ship resumed her previous role after the war until she was decommissioned in 1926 and sold for scrap three years later.

== Design and description ==
Pothuau measured 113.1 metres (371 ft 1 in) long overall with a beam of 15.3 metres (50 ft 2 in) and had a maximum draught of 6.4 metres (21 ft 0 in). She displaced 5,460 tonnes (5,374 long tons) at normal load and 5,690 tonnes (5,600 long tons) at deep load. The ship was fitted with a prominent plough-shaped bow and was considered a good sea boat. She had a crew of 21 officers and 434 enlisted men; assignment as a flagship added 5 officers and 29 more sailors.

The ship had two vertical triple-expansion steam engines, each driving a single 4.4-metre (14 ft 5 in) propeller. Steam for the engines was provided by 18 Belleville boilers at a working pressure of 17 kg/cm^{2} (1,667 kPa; 242 psi) and the engines were rated at a total of 10,000 indicated horsepower (7,500 kW; 10,000 PS) using forced draught. Pothuau exceeded her designed speed of 19 knots (35 km/h; 22 mph) during her sea trials, reaching 19.2 knots (35.6 km/h; 22.1 mph) from 10,398 PS (7,648 kW). She carried up to 630 tonnes (620 long tons) of coal and could steam for 4,500 nautical miles (8,300 km; 5,200 mi) at a speed of 10 knots (19 km/h; 12 mph).

Pothuau's main armament consisted of two 40-calibre 194 mm (7.6 in) Modèle 1893 guns that were mounted in single-gun turrets, one each fore and aft of the superstructure. The guns fired 75–90.3-kilogram (165–199 lb) shells at muzzle velocities ranging from 770 to 800 metres per second (2,500 to 2,600 ft/s). The ship's secondary armament comprised ten 40-calibre 138 mm (5.4 in) Modèle 1893 guns, five on each broadside in casemates. Their 30–35-kilogram (66–77 lb) shells were fired at muzzle velocities of 730 to 770 metres per second (2,400 to 2,500 ft/s). For close-range anti-torpedo boat defense, she carried a dozen quick-firing (QF) 47-millimetre (1.9 in) and eight QF 37-millimetre (1.5 in) Hotchkiss guns. Pothuau was also armed with four 450-millimetre (17.7 in) above-water rotating torpedo tubes.

Pothuau was protected by a nickel-steel armour belt that ranged in thickness from 80 millimetres (3.1 in) amidships to 52 millimetres (2.0 in) at the ship's ends. It extended from 1.2 metres (3 ft 11 in) below the waterline to 2.5 metres (8 ft 2 in) above it. The curved protective deck was 55–105 millimetres (2.2–4.1 in) thick. The armour protecting the conning tower was 240 millimetres (9.4 in) thick. Protecting the boiler rooms, engine rooms, and magazines below it was a thin splinter deck. The turret armour was 180 millimetres (7.1 in) thick and the casemates were protected by armour plates 84 millimetres (3.3 in) thick. All told the ship's armour weighed 1,346 tonnes (1,325 long tons).

== Construction and career ==
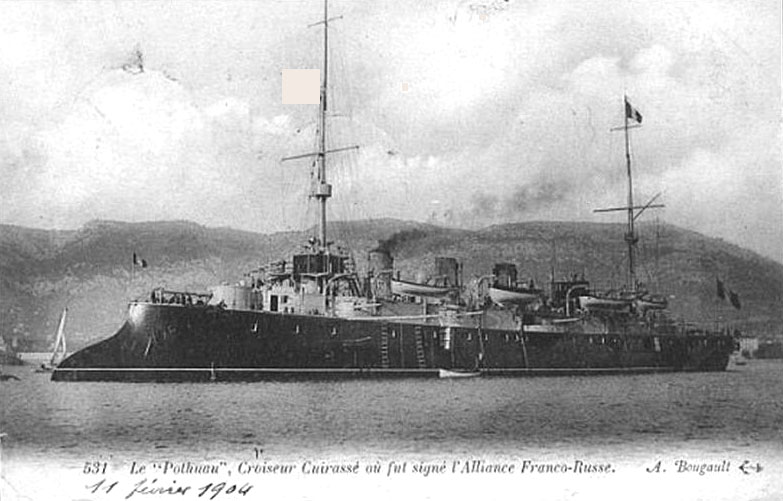
"The Pothuau, armoured cruiser on which the Franco-Russian Alliance was signed"

Pothuau, named after French admiral and politician Louis Pothuau, was ordered on 11 April 1893 from Forges et Chantiers de la Méditerranée. The ship was laid down on 25 May 1893 at their Le Havre-Graville shipyard and finally launched on 19 September 1895, after two unsuccessful attempts on 22 and 23 August. She was commissioned for sea trials on 17 August 1896, definitively commissioned on 8 June 1897 and accepted from the builder (fin de recettes) on 9 July.

Assigned to the Escadre du Nord (Northern Squadron), the ship represented France during Queen Victoria's Diamond Jubilee Fleet Review at Spithead in June 1897 and then conveyed the President of France, Félix Faure, from Dunkerque to Russia the following August. Pothuau was transferred to the Escadre de Méditerranée (Mediterranean Fleet) in 1898 where she became flagship of the Escadre Légere (Light Squadron). During the annual naval maneuvers in June–July 1900, the ship was the flagship of Contre-Amiral (Counter Admiral) Maréchal who was relieved by Contre-Amiral Caillard several months later. Around May 1904 the ship was relieved as the flagship of the Mediterranean Fleet's Cruiser Squadron and she was placed into reserve in mid-1905. Pothuau was recommissioned on 17 April 1906 to serve as a gunnery training ship and became flagship of the combined gunnery school under Contre-Amiral Le Bris in 1910. During this time the ship tested a fire-control system, and continued as a gunnery training ship through July 1914.

In August 1914, at the beginning of World War I, Pothuau was serving in the Mediterranean Sea with the 1st Armée Navale (Main Fleet), patrolling off the eastern coast of Spain with the elderly battleships Jauréguiberry and Bouvet. In early September the three were transferred to the area between Corsica and Italy to interdict German reservists sailing from Barcelona, Spain, to Genoa, Italy. The ship departed Toulon on 24 October to support the invasion of the German colony of Kamerun in Africa and remained there until relieved by the protected cruiser Friant on 21 June 1915. She arrived at Lorient on 19 July to begin an overhaul that lasted until 2 January 1916. Pothuau was then transferred to the Red Sea and Indian Ocean where she escorted Allied merchant ships and searched for German commerce raiders.

Together with the British seaplane tender Raven II, Pothuau sailed for the Indian Ocean to hunt for the German merchant raider Wolf on 10 March 1917. The two ships searched the Laccadive Islands en route to Colombo, Ceylon, which they reached on 2 April. They then searched the Chagos Archipelago and the Maldive Islands and returned to Colombo without finding the German ship. On 17 May Pothuau began a brief overhaul at Saigon, French Indochina, before returning to the Mediterranean in September. Upon returning to Toulon, she underwent a short refit that lasted until 9 November that allowed her to use a kite balloon.

Pothuau resumed her previous role of gunnery training ship after the war; during this time her main gun turrets were replaced by experimental anti-aircraft guns. The ship was decommissioned on 12 June 1926 and stricken on 3 November 1927. She was sold for 2,017,117 francs on 25 September 1929 to be broken up.
