= Fairey Hamble Baby =

British naval floatplane scout

Hamble Baby

General information
- Type: Floatplane scout
- National origin: United Kingdom
- Manufacturer: Fairey Aviation
- Status: Retired
- Primary users: Royal Naval Air Service Royal Air Force; Hellenic Navy
- Number built: 180

History
- Introduction date: 1917
- Developed from: Sopwith Baby

The Fairey Hamble Baby was a British single-seat naval patrol floatplane designed and built by Fairey Aviation for the Royal Naval Air Service

== Design and development ==
Fairey Aviation built a number of Sopwith Baby floatplanes at its Hamble works. A variant of the Sopwith Baby was built by the Fairey Aviation Co., Ltd. On 23 October 1916, Sopwith Baby No.8134 was sent to the Fairey works for repair, and the opportunity was taken to rebuild the aircraft to incorporate a number of modifications. The most significant was the Fairey Patent Camber Gear, which was a form of trailing edge flap used to increase lift. On the Fairey-built aircraft, the entire trailing edge of each wing was hinged along the rear spar, lowered by rotating a handwheel in the cockpit. A differential device ensured that the flaps could still be actuated as ailerons; thus, lateral control was maintained. In this modified form, the aircraft was known as the Fairey Hamble Baby. Production Hamble Babies differed in appearance from those built by Sopwith and Blackburn. The planform of wings and tailplane were changed: the wings had increased span and reduced chord, had rounded tips, and the tailplane had a characteristic shape different from the semi-circular outline of the Sopwith original. A new and angular fin, Fairey-designed main floats of new form, and an enlarged tail float were fitted, and the engine cowling was modified. Parnall also produced Hamble Babies, which had some detail differences from the Fairey produced aircraft. The last 74 aircraft were produced by Parnall as landplanes and known as the Hamble Baby Convert.

== Operators ==
Greece

- Hellenic Navy

United Kingdom

- Royal Air Force
  - No. 219 Squadron RAF
  - No. 225 Squadron RAF
  - No. 229 Squadron RAF
  - No. 249 Squadron RAF
  - No. 253 Squadron RAF
  - No. 263 Squadron RAF
- Royal Naval Air Service

== Specifications (110 hp Clerget) ==
Data from The British Fighter since 1912

General characteristics

- Crew: One
- Length: 23 ft 4 in (7.11 m)
- Wingspan: 27 ft 9 1/4 in (8.465 m)
- Height: 9 ft 6 in (2.90 m)
- Wing area: 246 sq ft (22.9 m^{2})
- Empty weight: 1,386 lb (629 kg)
- Gross weight: 1,946 lb (883 kg)
- Powerplant: 1 × Clerget rotary engine, 110 hp (82 kW)

Performance

- Maximum speed: 92 mph (148 km/h, 80 kn)
- Endurance: 2 h
- Service ceiling: 7,500 ft (2,300 m)
- Time to altitude: 5 min 30 s to 2,000 ft (610 m)

Armament

- Guns: 1 × 0.303 in (7.7 mm) Lewis Gun

== See also ==
Related development

- Sopwith Baby

Aircraft of comparable role, configuration, and era

- Port Victoria P.V.1

Related lists

- List of aircraft of the Royal Air Force
- List of aircraft of the Royal Naval Air Service
- List of flying boats and floatplanes
