= French cruiser Jeanne d'Arc (1899) =

French armoured cruiser of the early 20th century

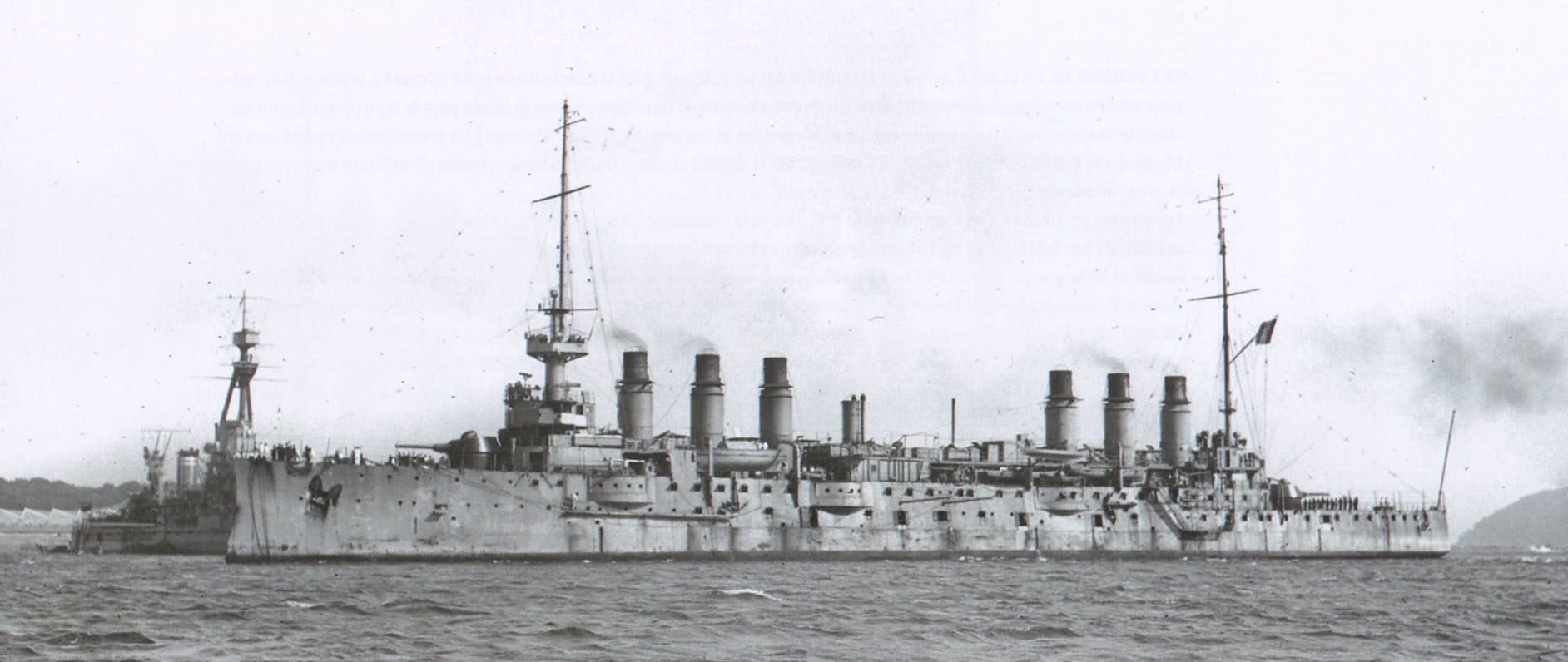
- Jeanne d'Arc at anchor

Class overview
- Operators: French Navy
- Preceded by: Pothuau
- Succeeded by: Gueydon class

History
- Name: Jeanne d'Arc
- Namesake: Joan of Arc
- Ordered: 28 December 1895
- Builder: Arsenal de Toulon
- Laid down: October 1896
- Launched: 8 June 1899
- Commissioned: 10 March 1903
- Renamed: Jeanne d'Arc II (1930)
- Reclassified: Training ship (1 May 1912–1 August 1914); (August 1919–1928)
- Stricken: 15 February 1933
- Nickname(s): La Jeanne"L'étui à cigarettes"
- Fate: Sold for scrap, 9 July 1934

General characteristics
- Type: Armoured cruiser
- Displacement: 11,445 tonnes (11,264 long tons)
- Length: 147 m (482 ft 3 in) (o/a)
- Beam: 19.42 m (63 ft 9 in)
- Draught: 8 m (26 ft 3 in)
- Installed power: 28,500 ihp (21,300 kW; 28,900 PS); 36 water-tube boilers
- Propulsion: 3 Shafts; 3 triple-expansion steam engines
- Speed: 21 knots (39 km/h; 24 mph)
- Range: 13,500 nmi (25,000 km; 15,500 mi) at 10 knots (19 km/h; 12 mph)
- Complement: 651
- Armament: 2 × single 194 mm (7.6 in) guns; 14 × single 138.6 mm (5.5 in) guns; 16 × single 47 mm (1.9 in) guns; 2 × 450 mm (17.7 in) torpedo tubes
- Armour: Waterline belt: 80–150 mm (3.1–5.9 in); Deck: 45–55 mm (1.8–2.2 in); Gun turrets: 161 mm (6.3 in); Barbettes: 60–140 mm (2.4–5.5 in); Conning tower: 138 mm (5.4 in)

Jeanne d'Arc ([ʒan daʁk]) was an armoured cruiser built for the French Navy (Marine Nationale) at the end of the 19th century, the sole ship of her class. Completed in 1903, she was initially assigned to the Northern Squadron (French: Escadre du Nord), although she was transferred to the reserve fleet before the end of the year. The ship was recommissioned for a few months in mid-1905 and was transferred to the Mediterranean Fleet (Escadre de Méditerranée) in mid-1906 and served as a flagship for the next several years. Jeanne d'Arc was assigned to the reserve in mid-1908 and modified to serve as a training ship for naval cadets of the Naval Academy (École Navale). In 1912, she made the first of two lengthy training cruises.

A few days after she returned from her cruise, the ship was mobilised for service with the Northern Squadron as tensions rose before World War I began in August 1914. Jeanne d'Arc was tasked to patrol the English Channel in search of contraband and German blockade runners and continued to perform that mission until March 1915 when she was transferred to the Mediterranean. The ship was initially assigned to support French troops in the Dardanelles Campaign and then became flagship of the French ships patrolling the Levantine coast. In early 1916, Jeanne d'Arc began a lengthy refit that lasted until 1917 when she was assigned to the French West Indies. The ship was placed in reserve in 1918 and resumed her previous role as a training ship the next year. Jeanne d'Arc returned to reserve in 1928 and was struck from the Navy List in 1933 before being sold for scrap the following year.

== Background and description ==
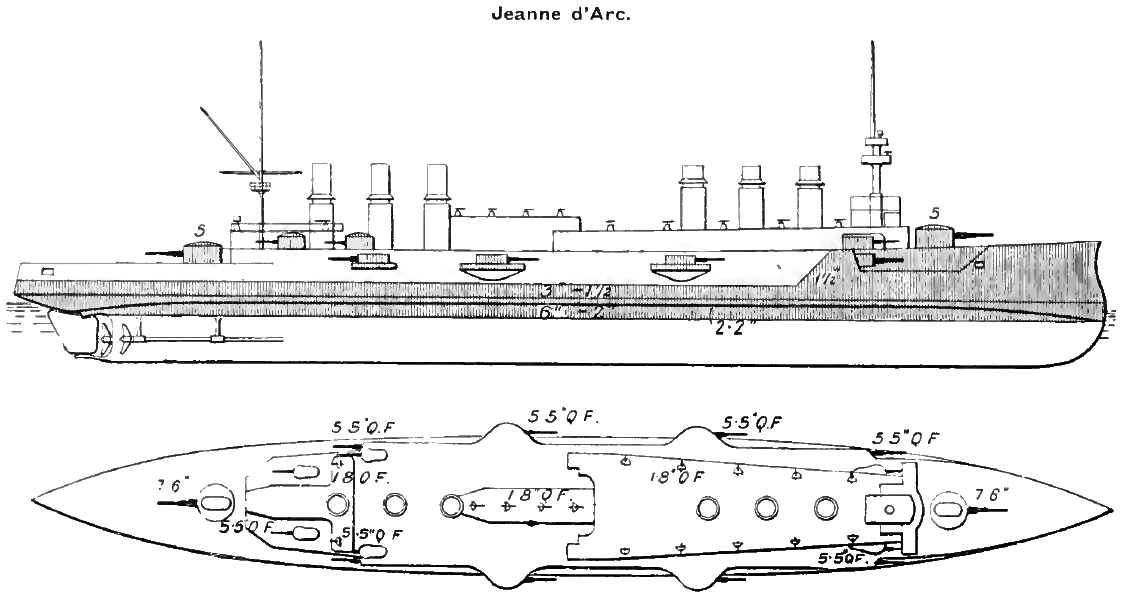
Plan and right elevation of Jeanne d'Arc from Brassey's Naval Annual 1915, showing the armour layout and positions of the guns. (The plan is incorrect regarding the upper superstructure and the position of the second 138 mm (5.5 in) gun on upper deck — it should be in the middle of the ship.)

Jeanne d'Arc was originally conceived in the early 1890s as a large protected cruiser for overseas service, but the design was recast as an armoured cruiser by the naval architect Emile Bertin, director of the Navy's Technical Section (Section technique) in 1895. His design is regarded as unsuccessful with too light an armament for her size and failing to achieve her designed speed. The ship measured 147 metres (482 ft 3 in) long overall with a beam of 19.42 metres (63 ft 9 in) and had a maximum draught of 8 metres (26 ft 3 in). She displaced 11,264 tonnes (11,086 long tons) at normal load and had a metacentric height of 1.458 metres (5 ft). The hull was subdivided by 15 watertight bulkheads that extended from her double bottom to the main armoured deck. Jeanne d'Arc had a crew of 651.

The ship had 3 four-cylinder vertical triple-expansion steam engines, each driving a single three-bladed propeller. The outer engines had 5-metre (16 ft 5 in) propellers while the centre propeller had a diameter of 4.7 metres (15 ft 5 in). Steam for the engines was provided by 36 Guyot-du Temple boilers and the engines were rated at a total of 28,500 indicated horsepower (21,300 kW; 28,900 PS). Jeanne d'Arc failed to reach her designed speed of 23 knots (43 km/h; 26 mph) during her sea trials on 23 January 1903, only reaching 21.7 knots (40.2 km/h; 25.0 mph) from 29,691 ihp (22,141 kW; 30,103 PS). She carried up to 2,100 tonnes (2,067 long tons) of coal that gave her a range of 13,500 nautical miles (25,000 km; 15,500 mi) at a speed of 10 knots (19 km/h; 12 mph). In an effort to improve her speed, the propellers and the struts for her propeller shafts were replaced and her bilge keels were shortened, but the ship is not known to have exceeded her trials speed.

Jeanne d'Arc's main armament consisted of two 40-calibre 194 mm (7.6 in) Modèle 1893 guns that were mounted in single-gun turrets, one each fore and aft of the superstructure. The guns fired 75–90.3-kilogram (165–199 lb) shells at muzzle velocities ranging from 770 to 800 metres per second (2,500 to 2,600 ft/s). The ship's secondary armament comprised fourteen 45-calibre 138.6 mm (5.5 in) Modèle 1893 guns in single mounts, protected by gun shields. Four of the guns on each broadside were positioned in hull sponsons and the remaining guns were on the sides of the superstructure. Their 30–35-kilogram (66–77 lb) shells were fired at muzzle velocities of 730 to 770 metres per second (2,400 to 2,500 ft/s). For close-range anti-torpedo boat defense, she carried sixteen quick-firing 40-calibre 47-millimetre (1.9 in) Modèle 1885 Hotchkiss guns. Four of these were mounted in the fighting top on the military foremast and the others were positioned in the superstructure. Jeanne d'Arc was also armed with a pair of submerged 450-millimetre (17.7 in) torpedo tubes. The ship carried six Modèle 1892 torpedoes that were fitted with a 75-kilogram (165 lb) warhead and had a range of 800 metres (870 yd) at a speed of 27.5 knots (50.9 km/h; 31.6 mph).

=== Protection ===
Jeanne d'Arc was protected by a waterline armour belt of Harvey armour that was 150 mm (5.9 in) thick amidships and reduced to 100 millimetres (3.9 in) at the bow and 80 millimetres (3.1 in) at the stern. It extended from 1.5 metres (4 ft 11 in) below the waterline to 0.7 metres (2 ft 4 in) above it and tapered to a thickness of 50 millimetres (2.0 in) at its lower edge. Above this was a strake of 80-millimetre armour that was 1.92 metres (6 ft 4 in) amidships and tapered to 40 millimetres (1.6 in) at its upper edge. Three additional strakes of 40-millimetre armour covered the sides of the bow up to the forecastle deck.

The sloped protective deck met the bottom edge of the waterline armour belt and ranged in thickness from 45 to 55 millimetres (1.8 to 2.2 in) of mild steel on two layers of 10-millimetre (0.4 in) "extra-mild" steel. Above it was a thin deck of 11-millimetre (0.4 in) armour on a 7-millimetre (0.3 in) deck. The armour protecting the conning tower was 138 millimetres thick. The turret plates were made from Krupp armour 161 millimetres (6.3 in) thick on two layers of 11-millimetre plating with a roof 20 millimetres (0.8 in) thick on a 10-millimetre plate. The barbette armour was 160 millimetres (6.3 in) thick and reduced to 60 millimetres (2.4 in) below the upper deck. The gun shields of the secondary armament were 74 millimetres (2.9 in) thick and the sponsons were protected by hinged 40-millimetre plates.

== Construction and career ==
Jeanne d'Arc in 1901 before her completion

Jeanne d'Arc, named after the French warrior saint Joan of Arc, and nicknamed La Jeanne, was ordered on 28 December 1895 from the Arsenal de Toulon. While the Arsenal was not known for its speed of construction, the building of Jeanne d'Arc was even more prolonged than that shipyard's norm. Construction was almost at a standstill from September 1896 to June 1898, despite being laid down in October 1896, as the result of a dispute between the constructors and the naval administration and problems with her engines caused her to be launched on 8 June 1899 without her engines installed. The ship was commissioned for sea trials on 1 March 1901 and they revealed that the boiler rooms were very poorly ventilated and that the boilers were very poorly insulated resulting in a temperature of 65 °C (149 °F) in the boiler rooms. In addition the feed pumps frequently failed because of the temperature of the feed water was too high due to the overheating of the condensers. Rectifying these problems took until March 1902, although another set of trials in April revealed problems with the piston rings in all three engines. She was finally commissioned on 10 March 1903, before her trials were concluded.

On 14 April, Jeanne d'Arc ferried Émile Loubet, the President of France, to French North Africa before departing for Marseille on the 29th. Again manned for trials, the ship was assigned to the Northern Squadron, based at Brest, on 1 June and participated in exercises off the coast of Brittany over the next several months. Plagued by boiler problems, she was reduced to reserve on 14 September before being recommissioned on 8 October for trials. Apparently unsuccessful, Jeanne d'Arc was decommissioned for repairs on 15 November. The ship was recommissioned for trials in May 1905, but was placed in reserve on 6 August.

On 26 May 1906 Captain (Capitaine de vaisseau) Émile Guépratte assumed command of Jeanne d'Arc and she was assigned to the Mediterranean Fleet where she became flagship of the Light Squadron (Escadre Légere). After port visits in Tangiers, Morocco, and Gibraltar, she rendezvoused with the fleet on 12 July for the annual Grand Manoeuvres that lasted until the 28th. The ship participated in a fleet review by the President of France, Armand Fallières, at Marseille on 16 September to commemorate the laying of the first stone of the Rove canal tunnel connecting Marseille to the Rhône River. The following month, Jeanne d'Arc made a port visit to Bizerta, French Tunis. In 1907, the ship visited Morocco, Algeria and Cherbourg before getting her bottom cleaned at Brest in June and returning to Toulon on 20 July. After departing Gibraltar on 12 February 1908, she had a boiler explode, killing five and badly burning three crewmen. After arriving at Brest three days later, the ship was placed in reserve on 15 April to begin modifications to make her suitable for use as a training ship for naval cadets. Jeanne d'Arc was recommissioned on 20 May 1911 and was attached to the Third Division of the Reserve Squadron until 1 May 1912 when she was transferred to the Atlantic Schools Division. The ship began a lengthy cruise of the Atlantic, Mediterranean and Baltic Seas that lasted from 10 October 1912 to 29 July 1913. She visited the Indian Ocean via the Suez Canal on her next cruise from 10 October 1913 to 27 July 1914.

=== World War I ===
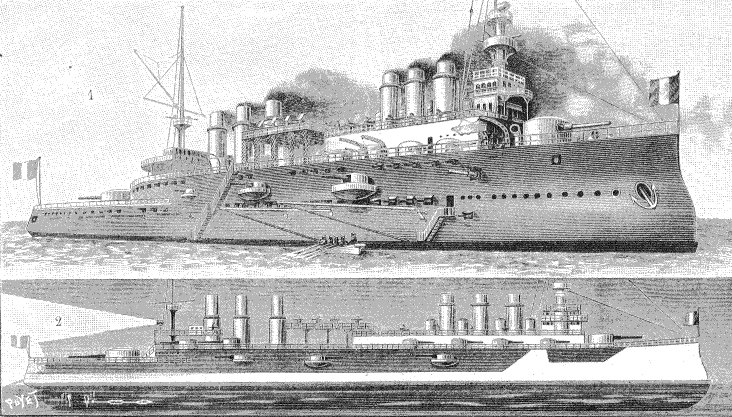
Drawing of Jeanne d'Arc

Jeanne d'Arc rejoined the Northern Squadron when mobilisation began on 1 August and was assigned to the 1st Division of the Second Light Squadron. After the German declaration of war on 3 August, she was assigned to patrol the western portion of the English Channel in search of blockade runners or ships carrying contraband. The ship remained there until reinforcements were needed in the Eastern Mediterranean after the beginning of the Dardanelles Campaign in February. Jeanne d'Arc was transferred to the Third Squadron in March 1915 where her first mission was to escort a troop convoy to Mudros. In late April, the French made several diversionary landings on the Anatolian side of the Dardanelles while the British made the primary landings on the Gallipoli Peninsula on the European side. The ship supported these landings and was hit twice by 150-millimetre shells on 26 April. One shell damaged a sponson, started a small fire and wounded some of her crew. The other shell failed to detonate and was tossed overboard.

Shortly afterwards, she became the flagship of the Third Squadron, hoisting the flags of Vice-Admirals (Vice-Amiral) Louis Dartige du Fournet, Dominique-Marie Gauchet, and Frederic Moreau until 30 March 1916. During this time, Jeanne d'Arc was based in Port Said, Egypt, enforcing the Allied blockade of the Turkish-owned Levantine and Aegean coasts. The ship supported the occupation of the islands of Ruad on 30–31 August 1915 and Castellorizo on 28 December. She also occasionally bombarded Turkish and German targets, including the German consulates in Alexandretta and Caiffa. Jeanne d'Arc was briefly refitted at Malta in October 1915 before returning to the Levant. The ship was withdrawn from the Levant at the end of March 1916 for a major refit in France. Upon its completion in January 1917, she was transferred to the 4th Light Squadron in the West Indies. Jeanne d'Arc returned to France in 1918 and was placed in reserve with a reduced crew.

=== Post-war activities ===
In 1919 the ship was refitted to allow her to resume her previous role as a training cruiser and was recommissioned in August 1919. Over the next decade, she made nine lengthy cruises, usually departing Brest in September or October and returning around the following July. On 30 April 1925, the ship was in Pireaus, Greece and some sailors played a friendly football match with Olympiacos FC. This was the first friendly football match in the history of Olympiacos FC, with the Greek team winning 6-0. During the last of these cruises in 1927–1928, Jeanne d'Arc was commanded by François Darlan. After returning to France that year, the ship was replaced by the newer armoured cruiser Edgar Quinet and reduced to reserve. She was renamed Jeanne d'Arc II in 1930 to free her name for a purpose-built training cruiser then under construction and was stricken from the list on 15 February 1933. The ship was condemned on 21 March and sold for scrap on 9 July 1934.

== Bibliography ==
- Chesneau, Roger & Kolesnik, Eugene M., eds. (1979). Conway's All the World's Fighting Ships 1860–1905. Greenwich: Conway Maritime Press. ISBN 0-8317-0302-4.
- Feron, Luc (2018). "The Armoured Cruiser Jeanne d'Arc". In Jordan, John (ed.). Warship 2018. Oxford, UK: Osprey. pp. 67–84. ISBN 978-1-4728-2999-3.
- Friedman, Norman (2011). Naval Weapons of World War One: Guns, Torpedoes, Mines and ASW Weapons of All Nations: An Illustrated Directory. Barnsley, UK: Seaforth. ISBN 978-1-84832-100-7.
- Jordan, John & Caresse, Philippe (2019). French Armoured Cruisers 1887–1932. Barnsley, UK: Seaforth Publishing. ISBN 978-1-5267-4118-9.
- Silverstone, Paul H. (1984). Directory of the World's Capital Ships. New York: Hippocrene Books. ISBN 0-88254-979-0.
