= Royal Aircraft Factory S.E.6 =

Proposed WWI single-engined biplane

S.E.6

General information
- Type: Scout aircraft
- National origin: United Kingdom
- Manufacturer: Royal Aircraft Factory
- Status: project only
- Number built: none

The Royal Aircraft Factory S.E.6 was a proposed single-engined, single seat biplane designed at the Royal Aircraft Factory in First World War.

The S.E.6 would have been powered by either a Rolls-Royce Falcon or an R.A.F. 4d.
