= Sopwith Tabloid =

1913 general aviation aircraft family

Tabloid/Schneider
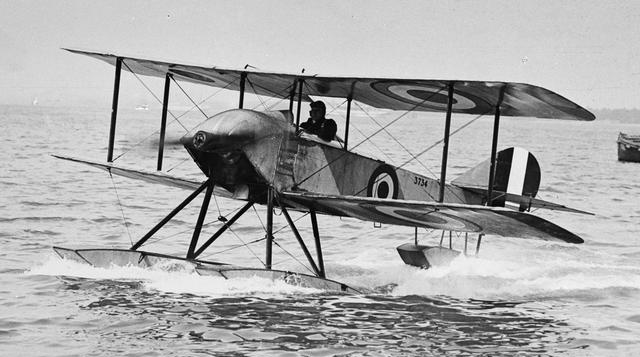

General information
- Type: Sports/scout aircraft
- National origin: United Kingdom
- Manufacturer: Sopwith Aviation Company
- Designer: Fred Sigrist
- Primary users: Royal Flying Corps Royal Naval Air Service
- Number built: About 42 Tabloids, 136 Schneiders

History
- Introduction date: 1914
- First flight: 1913
- Retired: 1918
- Variant: Sopwith Baby

The Sopwith Tabloid and Sopwith Schneider (floatplane) were British biplanes, originally designed as sports aircraft and later adapted for military use. They were among the first successful types to be built by the Sopwith Aviation Company. The "Tabloid", so named because of its small size, caused a sensation when it made its first public appearance.

A floatplane variant was prepared in under a month and entered for the 1914 Schneider Trophy race where it was piloted by Howard Pixton. This aircraft won the competition against minimal opposition.

Production orders for both types were placed by the military, and although a few Gnome Lambda-powered Tabloids saw limited service in the early war years, some Schneiders were still in Naval service four years later, at the end of the First World War.

== Design and development ==
The original Tabloid, which was first flown by Harry Hawker on 27 November 1913, was a two-seat single-bay biplane with a side-by-side seating, which was unusual at the time. The equal-span wings were staggered and used wing warping for lateral control. The rectangular-section fuselage was a conventional wire-braced wooden structure with the forward section covered in aluminium sheet and the remainder, aft of the cockpit, covered in fabric. The wings were also of wood, covered with fabric. The tail surfaces were of steel tubing, fabric-covered, and the undercarriage had a pair of forward-projecting skids in addition to the wheels. The most distinctive feature of the design was the engine cowling, which almost entirely covered the upper half of the engine.

The prototype was powered by an 80 hp (60 kW) Gnome Lambda rotary engine and in a trial flown by Harry Hawker at Farnborough the Tabloid reached 92 mph (148 km/h) and took only one minute to reach 1,200 ft (370 m) while carrying a passenger and enough fuel for 2 1/2 hours. A production order from the War Office for the Royal Flying Corps was placed early in 1914, and a total of 40 were built to this specification. However, the aircraft's speed made it an obvious candidate for entry to the Schneider Trophy competition.

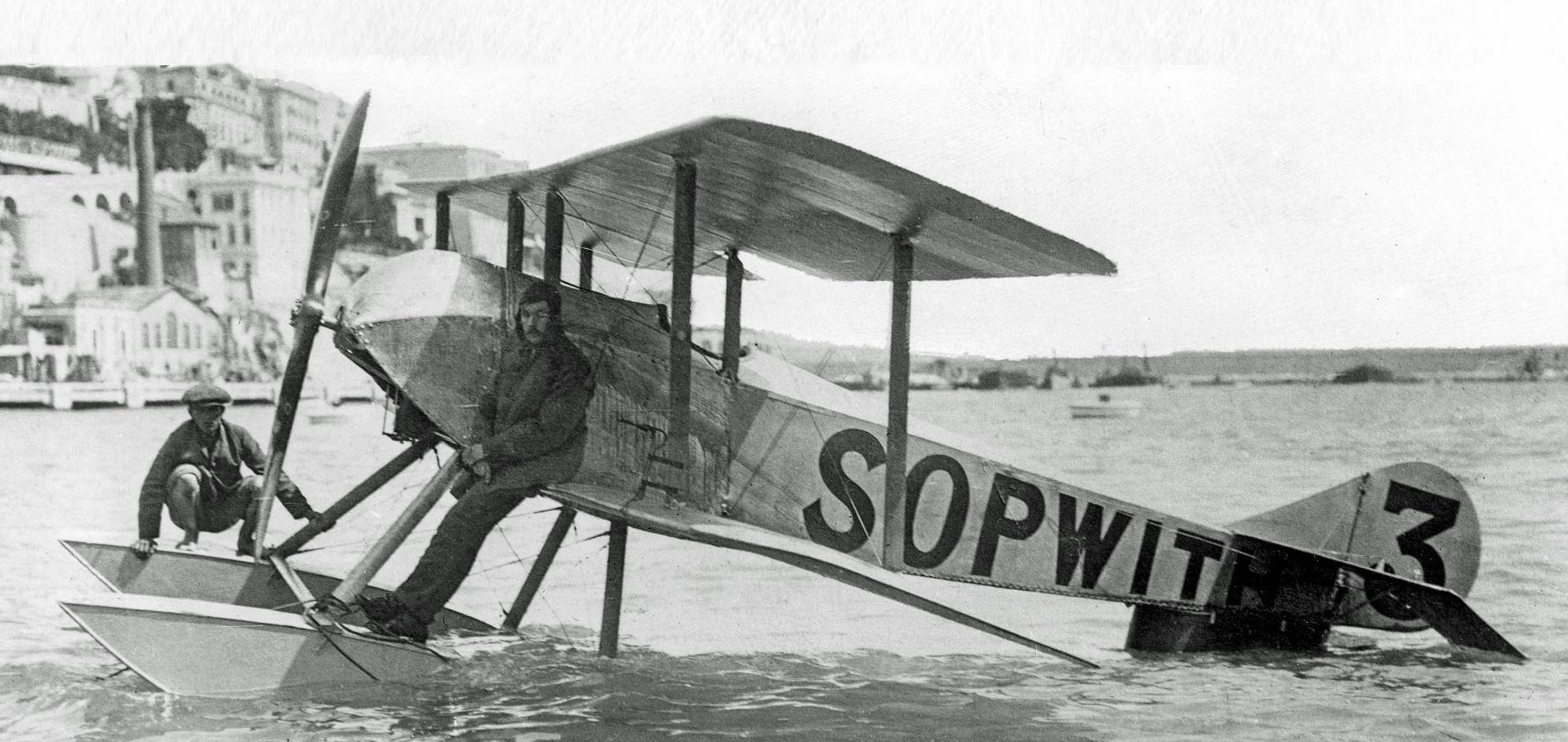
Sopwith Tabloid on floats which won the 1914 Schneider Race

Accordingly, a floatplane adaptation was prepared, to be powered by a 100 hp (75 kW) Gnome Monosoupape, which T.O.M. Sopwith personally collected from Paris. This was initially fitted with a single central float, but on its first taxiing trials with Howard Pixton at the controls the aircraft turned over as soon as the engine was started, and remained in the water for some hours before it could be retrieved. Great effort was made to make the waterlogged machine airworthy, and, lacking the time to prepare a new set of floats, the existing float was simply sawn in half down the middle and converted into a pair of floats. After a satisfactory test flight on 7 April the aircraft was shipped to Monaco, where the competition was to take place.

The competition was won by Pixton. (Note: The race was technically a time trial as each contestant departed in their own time and was timed, rather than them racing directly against each other.) Sopwith did not expect to win, but all of the leading contenders dropped out from mechanical problems connected to their nearly universal use of a larger two row rotary engine theoretically developing 160 hp (120 kW) to the Sopwith's 100, leaving the Sopwith to lap the only remaining contender in a 100 hp (75 kW) FBA Type A flying boat even before it stopped to refuel. Pixton completed his first circuit in around two thirds of the time taken by the FBA. One other competitor broke his prop without completing the race. It was the first British designed and built aircraft to win a major international contest. Much was made of the British design, with a British made Integral propeller, and protected with British cellon dope in the British press. Despite the other competitors dropping out, the Sopwith's speed, coupled with Pixton's flying skill, made for a convincing victory. The prizewinning variant was then known as the Sopwith Schneider. After completing the twenty-eight circuits required for the actual race, at an average speed of 86.75 mph (139.61 km/h) and suffering from a misfiring cylinder, he made additional laps to set a new world record for seaplanes.

The first order, for twelve "Schneider" floatplane aircraft, was placed in November 1914 by the Royal Naval Air Service. Like the race winner, these were powered by the 100 hp (75 kW) Monosoupape and differed only in minor detail from the racer - most noticeably in the redesigned tail float. Later production aircraft were fitted with ailerons in place of wing-warping, and were fitted with a Lewis gun firing upwards through an opening in the wing centre-section, and development would lead to the Sopwith Baby.

In all 160 were built. No original Tabloids or Schneiders survive but full-size reproductions are displayed at the Royal Air Force Museum London, Hendon and Brooklands Museum and a full-scale replica kit is sold by Airdrome Aeroplanes for homebuilders.

== Operational history ==
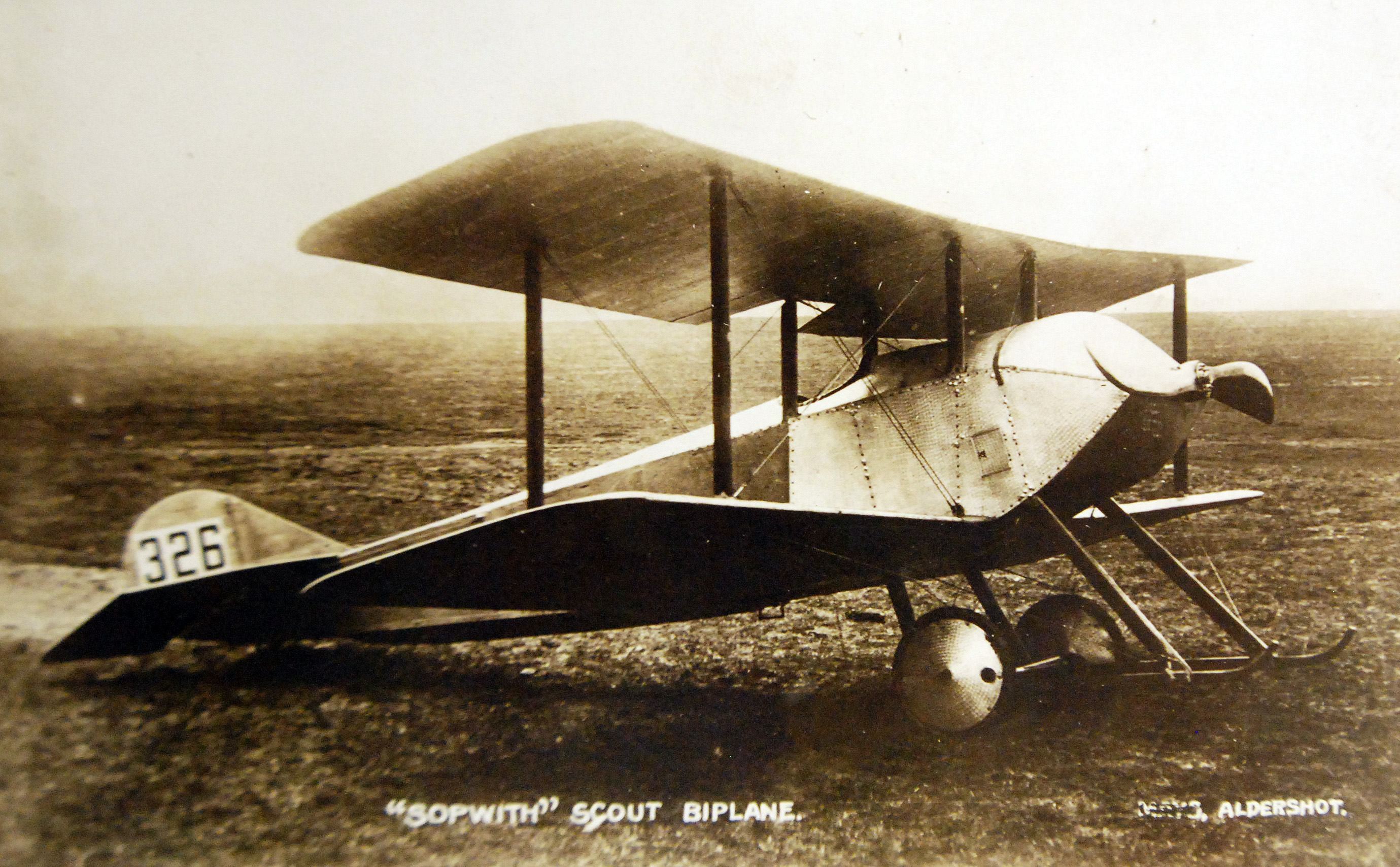
Single seat Sopwith Tabloid at Ithaca, New York, 1915

Single-seat variants of the Tabloid went into production in 1914 and 36 eventually entered service with the Royal Flying Corps and Royal Naval Air Service (RNAS). Deployed to France at the outbreak of the First World War, Tabloids were used as fast scouts.

Some naval aircraft were armed with a Lewis gun on the top wing, firing over the propeller arc. One other aircraft used a Lewis gun firing through the propeller arc with deflector wedges mounted on the propeller blades, but the Tabloid was also used as a bomber, when on 22 September 1914 Tabloids mounted the first raid by British aircraft on German soil; and in their most famous mission two RNAS Tabloids flying from Antwerp on 8 October 1914 attacked the German Zeppelin sheds at Cologne and Düsseldorf. The Cologne target was not located, the railway station being bombed instead, but the Zeppelin shed at Düsseldorf was struck by two 20 lb (9.1 kg) bombs dropped from 600 ft (180 m) and Zeppelin Z IX destroyed.

During 1915 attempts were made to use Schneiders to intercept Zeppelins over the North Sea, launching them from seaplane carriers including HMS Ben-my-Chree and Engadine, but these efforts were largely unsuccessful due to heavy seas either damaging the floats or making takeoff impossible entirely.

On 6 August 1915 a Schneider took off from the aircraft carrier HMS Campania using a jettisonable dolly.

A single Sopwith Schneider fighter seaplane was acquired by Captain Shiro Yamauchi, during an inspection tour of England, during 1915. While in Imperial Japanese Navy service it was designated Yokosuka Navy Ha-go Small Seaplane.

== Variants ==
Tabloid
Original wheeled version, two seater, 6 built
Single-seater Tabloid
Single-seat version for RFC and RNAS, 32+ built
1914 Schneider Racer
Single-seater Tabloid equipped with floats, 1 or 2 built
Schneider
Float equipped, production version of Schneider Racer for RNAS, 133 built
Gordon Bennett Racer
Variant with the fuselage partially faired to a circular section, a smaller fin and rudder, conventional engine cowling and V strut undercarriage without skids. Maximum speed 105 mph (169 km/h) Taken into service by the Admiralty on the outbreak of war as Nos. 1214 and 1215. Two built.
Lebed VII
Unlicensed copy of the design built by Lebed in Russia as a military reconnaissance aircraft
Lebed VIII
As Lebed VII but with revised undercarriage
Yokosuka Navy Ha-go Small Seaplane
A single Sopwith Schneider fighter seaplane operated by the IJN

== Operators ==
United Kingdom

- Royal Flying Corps
  - No. 3 Squadron RFC
- Royal Naval Air Service
- Royal Air Force
  - No. 201 Squadron RAF

Japan

- Imperial Japanese Navy Air Service

Russia

- Imperial Russian Navy

== Specifications (Production Schneider) ==
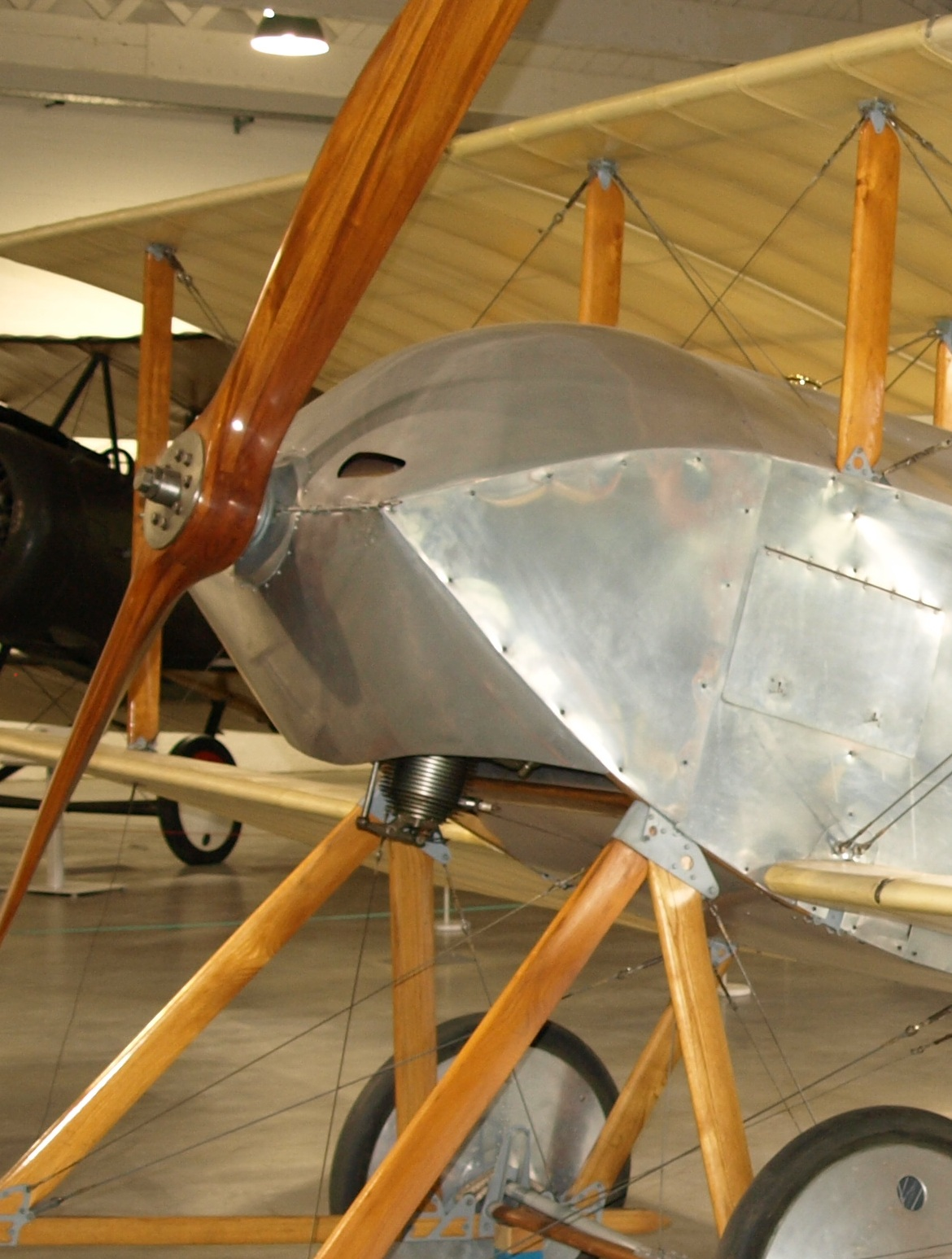
The Sopwith Tabloid replica on display at the Royal Air Force Museum.

Data from Sopwith – The Man and His Aircraft

General characteristics

- Crew: 1
- Length: 22 ft 10 in (6.96 m)
- Wingspan: 25 ft 8 in (7.82 m)
- Height: 10 ft 0 in (3.05 m)
- Wing area: 240 sq ft (22 m^{2})
- Empty weight: 1,220 lb (553 kg)
- Gross weight: 1,700 lb (771 kg)
- Powerplant: 1 × Gnome Monosoupape 9 Type B-2 9-cylinder rotary engine, 100 hp (75 kW)
- Propellers: 2-bladed wooden propeller

Performance

- Maximum speed: 87 mph (140 km/h, 76 kn)
- Range: 510 mi (820 km, 440 nmi)
- Service ceiling: 7,000 ft (2,100 m)
- Time to altitude: 6,500 ft (2,000 m) in 15 minutes

Armament

- Guns: 1 × 0.303 in (7.7 mm) Lewis gun occasionally fitted
- Bombs: 1× 65 lb (29 kg) or up to 5× 20 lb (9.1 kg) bombs

== See also ==
Related development

- Sopwith Baby

Aircraft of comparable role, configuration, and era

- Avro 511
- Bristol Scout

Related lists

- List of aircraft of the Royal Air Force
- List of aircraft of the Royal Flying Corps
- List of aircraft of the Royal Naval Air Service
