= Sopwith Baby =

British WW1 biplane reconnaissance aircraft

Baby
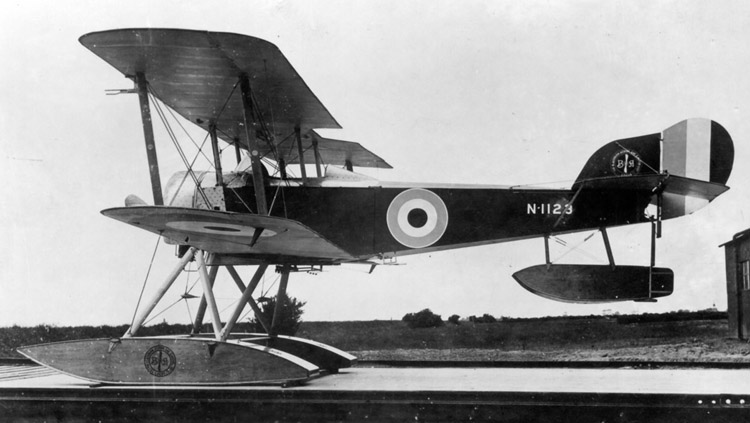
- Sopwith Baby in use with the Royal Norwegian Navy Air Service

General information
- Type: scout and bomber floatplane
- National origin: United Kingdom
- Manufacturer: Sopwith Aviation Company
- Status: Retired
- Primary users: Royal Naval Air Service Aviazione della Regia Marina
- Number built: 386 (Note: 100 were built by Sopwith, 186 by Blackburn and 100 by Ansaldo.)

History
- Introduction date: 1915
- First flight: September 1915
- Developed from: Sopwith Schneider
- Variants: Fairey Hamble Baby

The Sopwith Baby is a British single-seat floatplane that was operated by the Royal Naval Air Service (RNAS) from 1915.

== Development and design ==
The Baby (also known as the Admiralty 8200 Type) was a development of the two-seat Sopwith Schneider. The Baby utilized a wooden structure with fabric covering. A Lewis Gun was fitted, either above the fuselage firing through the propeller arc without the benefit of synchronization, or over the top wing, firing above it. To meet the more demanding conditions of 1916–18, further modifications were made on aircraft built by Blackburn Aircraft at Leeds, United Kingdom. A modified variant of the Baby, the Fairey Hamble Baby was built by Fairey and Parnall.

The Royal Naval Air Service ordered 286 Sopwith Babies of which 100 were built by Sopwith at Kingston and 186 by Blackburn Aircraft at Leeds with others for export. License manufacture was also undertaken in Italy by SA Aeronautica Gio Ansaldo of Turin, who built 100 examples for the Italian Aviazione della Regia Marina.

== Operational history ==
The Baby was used as a shipborne reconnaissance and bomber aircraft operating from seaplane carriers and cruisers, as well as naval trawlers and minelayers. Many Babies were attached to RNAS coastal air stations located in England and Scotland and RNAS stations in Egypt, Greece and Italy.

A major role of the Baby was to warn of German Zeppelin raids as far from Britain as possible, along with tracking German naval movements.

Babies also saw service with the navies of the United States, France, Chile, Greece and Norway. In Norway additional Babies were built as replacements, with some seeing service until 1930. Two of the 10 Sopwith Baby floatplanes that were acquired by the Royal Norwegian Navy Air Service were brought to Svalbard in the summer of 1928 to participate in the search for the lost Norwegian polar explorer Roald Amundsen, but were not used for the search.

== Surviving aircraft ==
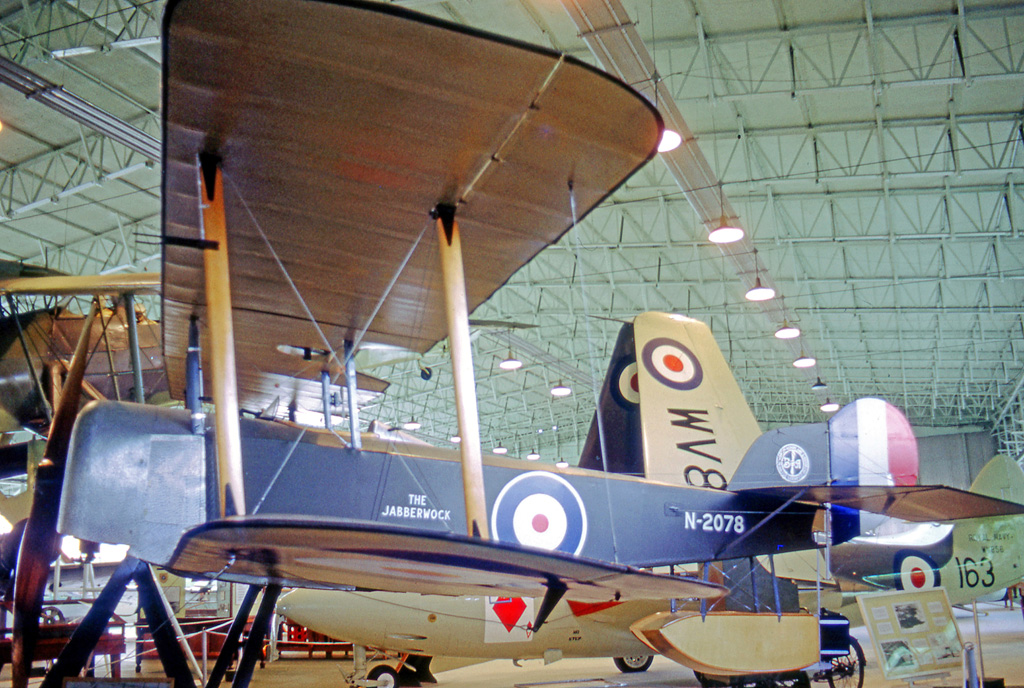
Composite Baby with original parts displayed at the Fleet Air Arm Museum, named The Jabberwock

The original components of two Babies built by Sopwith, Nos. 8214 and 8215, have been utilized to complete a composite aircraft for display at the Fleet Air Arm Museum at RNAS Yeovilton, Somerset. The exhibit has been marked with the serial N-2078, which was a Blackburn-built aircraft, and has been named The Jabberwock.

== Operators ==
Australia

- Royal Australian Navy operated 1 example (with a Royal Naval Air Service crew) in 1917 from cruiser HMAS Brisbane.

Chile

- Chilean Navy operated 3 examples from 1919–1923

France

- French Navy operated 33 examples from 1916–1919

Greece

- Hellenic Navy operated 19 from 1918–1919

Kingdom of Italy
Aviazione della Regia Marina 102 examples from 1917–1923 (including 2 trials aircraft from the UK)

Japan
Imperial Japanese Navy Air Service operated 1 example from 1916

Netherlands

- Dutch Naval Aviation Service 1 example from 1916–1919 An RNAS aircraft force landed forty miles off the Dutch coast and was towed in and interned.

Norway

- Royal Norwegian Navy Air Service operated 10 examples from 1917–1931

United Kingdom

- Royal Naval Air Service
- Royal Air Force
  - No. 219 Squadron RAF
  - No. 229 Squadron RAF
  - No. 246 Squadron RAF
  - No. 248 Squadron RAF
  - No. 249 Squadron RAF
  - No. 263 Squadron RAF
  - No. 269 Squadron RAF
  - No. 270 Squadron RAF

United States

- United States Navy

== Specifications ==
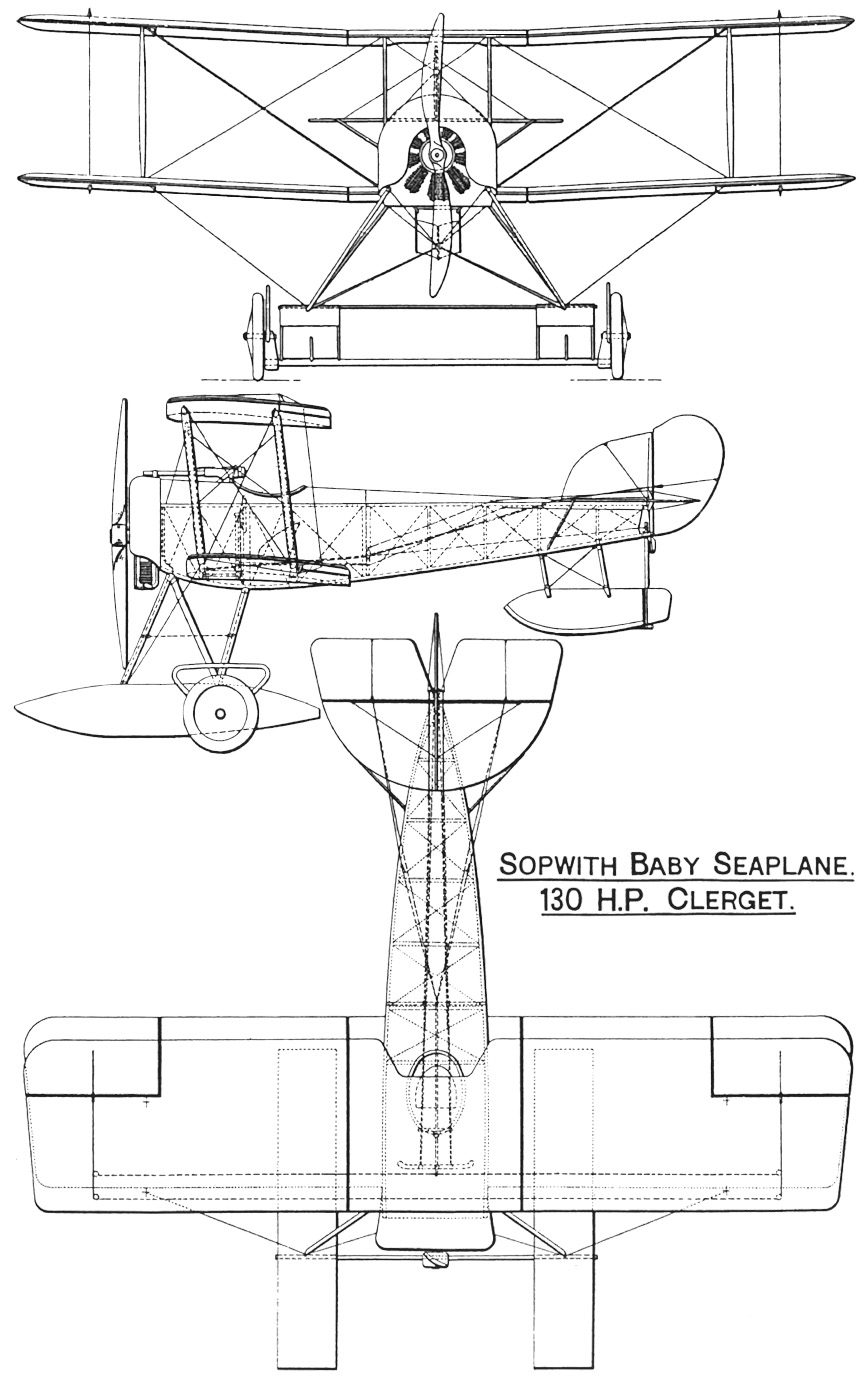
Sopwith Baby drawing (shown on beaching gear)

Data from Jane's Vintage Aircraft Recognition Guide

General characteristics

- Crew: 1
- Length: 23 ft 0 in (7.01 m)
- Wingspan: 25 ft 8 in (7.82 m)
- Height: 10 ft 0 in (3.05 m)
- Wing area: 240 sq ft (22 m^{2})
- Empty weight: 1,226 lb (556 kg)
- Gross weight: 1,715 lb (778 kg)
- Powerplant: 1 × Clerget 9Z 9-cylinder air-cooled rotary piston engine, 110 hp (82 kW)
- Propellers: 2-bladed fixed-pitch propeller

Performance

- Maximum speed: 100 mph (160 km/h, 87 kn) at sea level
- Endurance: 2 hours 15 minutes
- Service ceiling: 10,000 ft (3,000 m)
- Rate of climb: 285 ft/min (1.45 m/s)

Armament

- Guns: 1 × .303 in (7.7 mm) Lewis gun
- Bombs: 2 × 65 lb (29 kg) bombs

== See also ==
Related development

- Sopwith Tabloid
- Fairey Hamble Baby
- Port Victoria P.V.1

Related lists

- List of flying boats and floatplanes
- List of aircraft of the Royal Naval Air Service
