= HMS Ben-my-Chree =

British ship

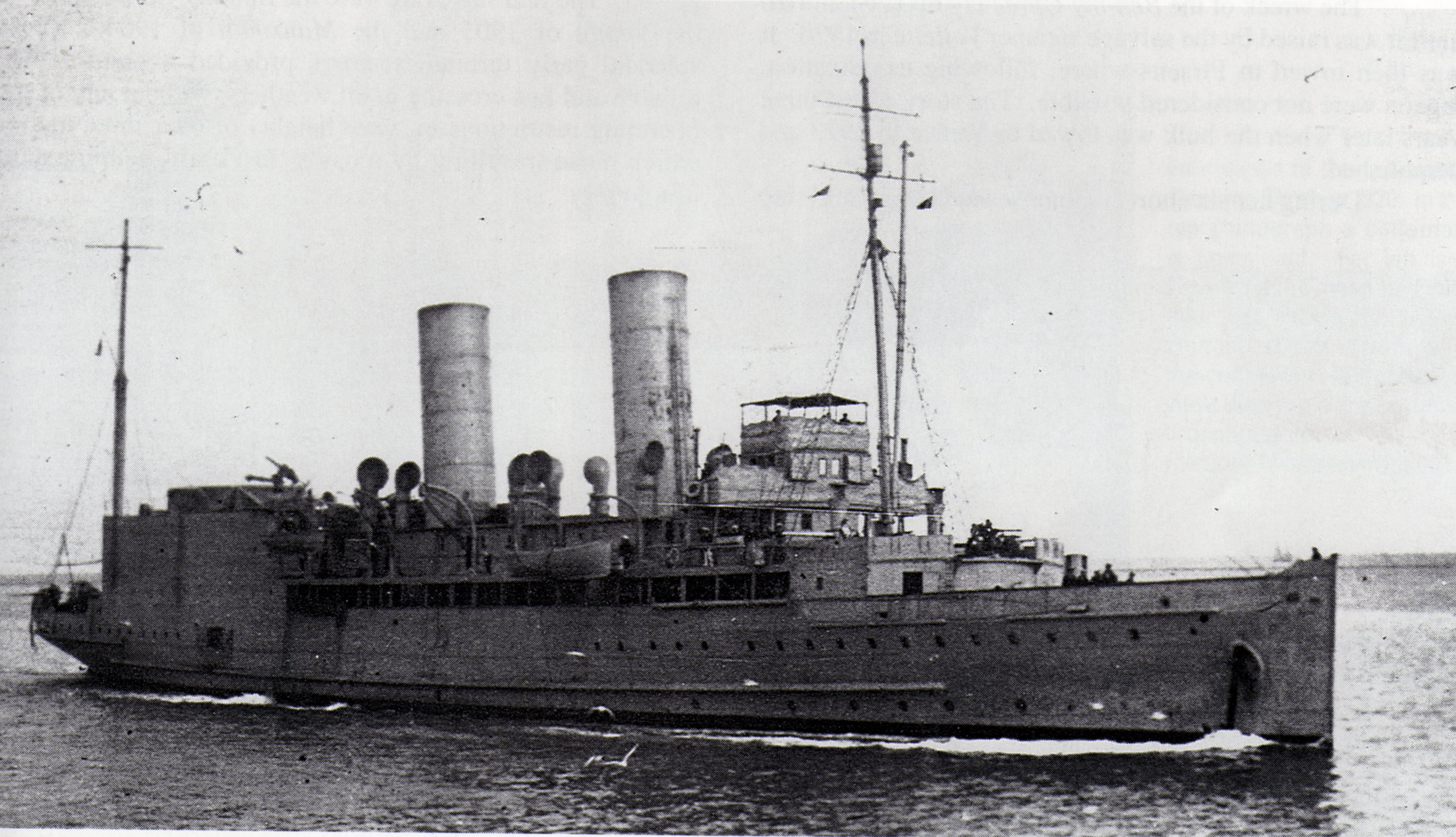
- HMS Ben-my-Chree

History

United Kingdom
- Name: Ben-my-Chree
- Namesake: Manx ben ma chree, "woman of my heart"
- Operator: Isle of Man Steam Packet Co.
- Port of registry: Douglas, Isle of Man
- Route: England–Isle of Man
- Builder: Vickers, Barrow-in-Furness
- Laid down: 1907
- Launched: 23 March 1908
- Completed: 8 August 1908
- Fate: Chartered by the Royal Navy, 1 January 1915

United Kingdom
- Name: HMS Ben-my-Chree
- Acquired: 1 January 1915
- Commissioned: 23 March 1915
- Fate: Sunk, 11 January 1917 by Ottoman artillery fire; Scrapped, 1923

General characteristics (as passenger ship)
- Type: Packet boat
- Tonnage: 2,651 GRT
- Length: 390 ft (118.9 m) (o/a)
- Beam: 46 ft (14.0 m)
- Depth: 18 ft 6 in (5.64 m)
- Decks: 5
- Installed power: 4 × cylindrical boilers
- Propulsion: 3 × shafts; 3 × Parsons steam turbines
- Speed: 24.2 kn (44.8 km/h; 27.8 mph)
- Capacity: 2,549
- Crew: 119

General characteristics (in RN service)
- Type: Seaplane carrier
- Displacement: 3,888 long tons (3,950 t)
- Length: 387 ft (118.0 m) (o/a)
- Draught: 16 ft (4.9 m)
- Installed power: 14,500 shp (10,800 kW)
- Speed: 24.5 kn (45.4 km/h; 28.2 mph)
- Crew: 250
- Armament: 4 × quick-firing 12-pounder guns; 2 × 3-pounder anti-aircraft guns
- Aircraft carried: 4–6 × seaplanes

HMS Ben-my-Chree (Manx: "Woman of My Heart") was a British packet steamer which served as a seaplane carrier in the Royal Navy during World War I. She was originally built in 1907 by Vickers for the Isle of Man Steam Packet Company and was intended for use on the England–Isle of Man route. Ben-my-Chree was the third vessel to bear her name. To this day, she holds the crossing speed record from Liverpool to Douglas, Isle of Man for a steamship at under three hours.

She was chartered by the Royal Navy at the beginning of 1915 and participated in several abortive attacks on Germany in May. The ship was transferred to the Dardanelles in June to support the Gallipoli campaign, and one of her aircraft made the first ship-launched aerial torpedo attack on a ship in August. After Gallipoli was evacuated at the end of the year, Ben-my-Chree became the flagship of the East Indies and Egypt Seaplane Squadron which operated in the Eastern Mediterranean, performing reconnaissance missions and attacking Ottoman facilities and troops.

She was sunk by Ottoman artillery fire while anchored at the recently occupied island of Kastellorizo in early 1917, with five members of her crew being injured. The ship was salvaged in 1920 and broken up in 1923. Ben-my-Chree was the only aviation vessel of either side sunk by enemy action during the war.

== Description and construction ==
SS Ben-my-Chree had a tonnage of 2,651 GRT. The ship was 390 feet (118.9 m) long overall and 375 feet (114.3 m) long between perpendiculars. She had a beam of 46 feet (14.0 m) and a depth of 18 feet 6 inches (5.64 m) from her main deck to the top of her keel. Ben-my-Chree had five decks and a capacity of 2,549 passengers with a crew of 119.

The ship was powered by three licence-built Parsons direct-drive steam turbines, each driving one propeller shaft. They were powered by steam provided by four cylindrical boilers at a working pressure of 170 psi (1,172 kPa; 12 kgf/cm^{2}) that gave her a speed of 24.2 knots (44.8 km/h; 27.8 mph). Her engines burnt up to 95 long tons (97 t) of coal a day, which made her an expensive ship to run.

She was ordered in 1907 by the Isle of Man Steam Packet Company and was built at the Vickers shipyard in Barrow-in-Furness at a cost of £112,000. The ship was launched on 23 March 1908 and completed on 8 August. Ben-my-Chree was normally laid up, because of her expense, except for the three busiest months of the year when she had a full complement of passengers.

== Royal Navy modifications and service ==
SS Ben-my-Chree was chartered by the Royal Navy on 1 January 1915 and she began her conversion into a seaplane carrier at the Cammell Laird shipyard in Birkenhead the following day. Part of her aft superstructure was removed and replaced by a hangar, aft of her rear funnel, that housed four to six seaplanes. The aircraft were lifted in and out of the water by derricks fore and aft. A dismountable 60-foot-long (18 m) flying-off platform was installed forward of her superstructure; it was equipped with a trolley and rails to allow a seaplane to take off.

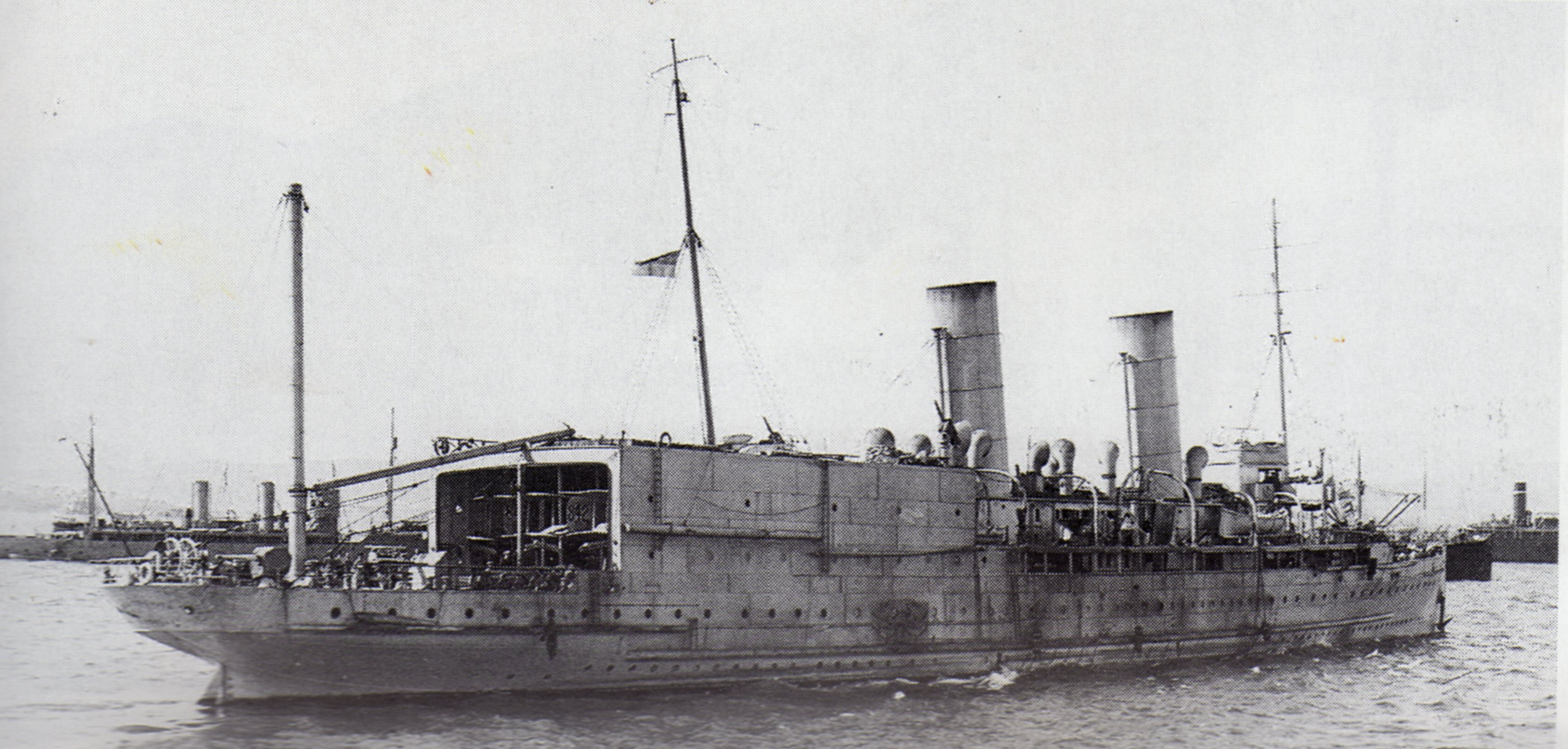
Stern view of HMS Ben-my-Chree, showing the aircraft hangars

In RN service the ship displaced 3,888 long tons (3,950 t), was 387 feet (118.0 m) long overall, and had a draught of 16 feet (4.9 m). Ben-my-Chree's turbines generated 14,500 shaft horsepower (10,800 kW) and she was credited with a speed of 24.5 knots (45.4 km/h; 28.2 mph) although that speed was exceeded in service. The ship could carry 502 long tons (510 t) of coal. Her crew consisted of approximately 250 officers and ratings.

Her armament consisted of four quick-firing (QF) 12-pounder 18 cwt guns, (Note: "Cwt" is the abbreviation for hundredweight, 18 cwt referring to the weight of the gun.) and two Vickers three-pounder AA guns. Ben-my-Chree carried 130 rounds per 12-pounder and 64 rounds for each three-pounder. In May 1916, one 12-pounder AA gun, a three-pounder, and a 2-pounder pom-pom, each on army carriages, were added.

She was initially assigned to the Harwich Force, under the command of Commander Cecil L'Estrange Malone, where on 3 May she took part in an abortive air raid on Norddeich that had to be abandoned because of thick fog. On 6 May, while on another unsuccessful mission to attack Norddeich, she was accidentally rammed by the destroyer Lennox in thick fog, although damage was slight. Another attempt was made on 11 May, but was again abandoned because of heavy fog. During this raid, Ben-my-Chree attempted to launch her Sopwith Schneider from a trolley off the fore deck, but the engine backfired, wrecking its starter, and breaking the pilot's wrist as the starter handle was in the cockpit.

=== To the Dardanelles ===
Illustration of Ben-my-Chree off the Dardanelles in 1915

In May 1915, she sailed for the Dardanelles, carrying two Short Type 184 torpedo bombers, and arrived at Lesbos on 10 June. Her aircraft were mainly involved in spotting for ships providing naval gunfire support for troops ashore, although they also conducted reconnaissance missions of the area. On 11 August, one of these missions had spotted an Ottoman ship off the north coast of the Sea of Marmora and, on the following day, Flight Commander Charles Edmonds attacked it flying a Short 184 seaplane. He left his observer behind and flew with a reduced fuel load to lighten his aircraft enough to carry a 14-inch (356 mm), 810-pound (370 kg) torpedo. He successfully dropped his aerial torpedo at a distance of about 800 yards (730 m) and an altitude of 15 feet (4.6 m). It turned out that his target had been beached after having been torpedoed by the British submarine E14. This was followed by a successful attack on 17 August against a 5,000-long-ton (5,100 t) ship by Edmonds. Flight Lieutenant George Dacre accompanied Edmonds on his flight in his own aircraft, but suffered engine troubles and had to land in the Dardanelles. He was taxiing on the water when he encountered a large steam tugboat, which he promptly torpedoed. After taxiing for several miles he was able to get airborne again and was within gliding distance of Ben-my-Chree when his engine failed permanently.

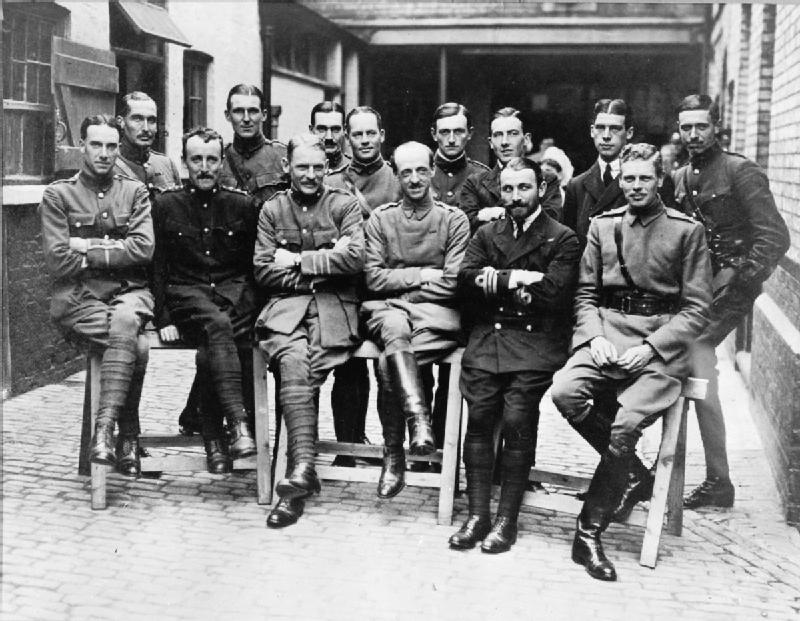
Commander Samson (front row, 2nd from right), and Lieutenant Malone standing behind him, with other officers of the R.F.C. in 1913

On 2 September, she helped to rescue Australian troops from the torpedoed troopship HMT Southland off Lemnos. The ship was transferred to Port Said, Egypt after the end of the Gallipoli Campaign. Ben-my-Chree became the flagship of the East Indies and Egypt Seaplane Squadron when it was formed in January 1916. The squadron was under the command of the General Officer Commanding, Egypt and its primary duty was to watch Ottoman positions and movements in southern Palestine and the Sinai.

In February 1916 she was sent from Port Said to the Libyan coast; on 11 February, her aircraft observed Sidi Barrani and Sollum, and on 15 February discovered the Senussi were encamped at Agagia. SS Uganda collided with her on 11 February and badly damaged the ship's bow. Permanent repairs took were made at Suez from 13 March to 25 April.

Commander Charles Samson replaced L'Estrange Malone as captain on 14 May. A few days later, Lieutenant William Benn joined the ship as an observer. Ben-my-Chree was based at Aden later in 1916.

=== Loss ===
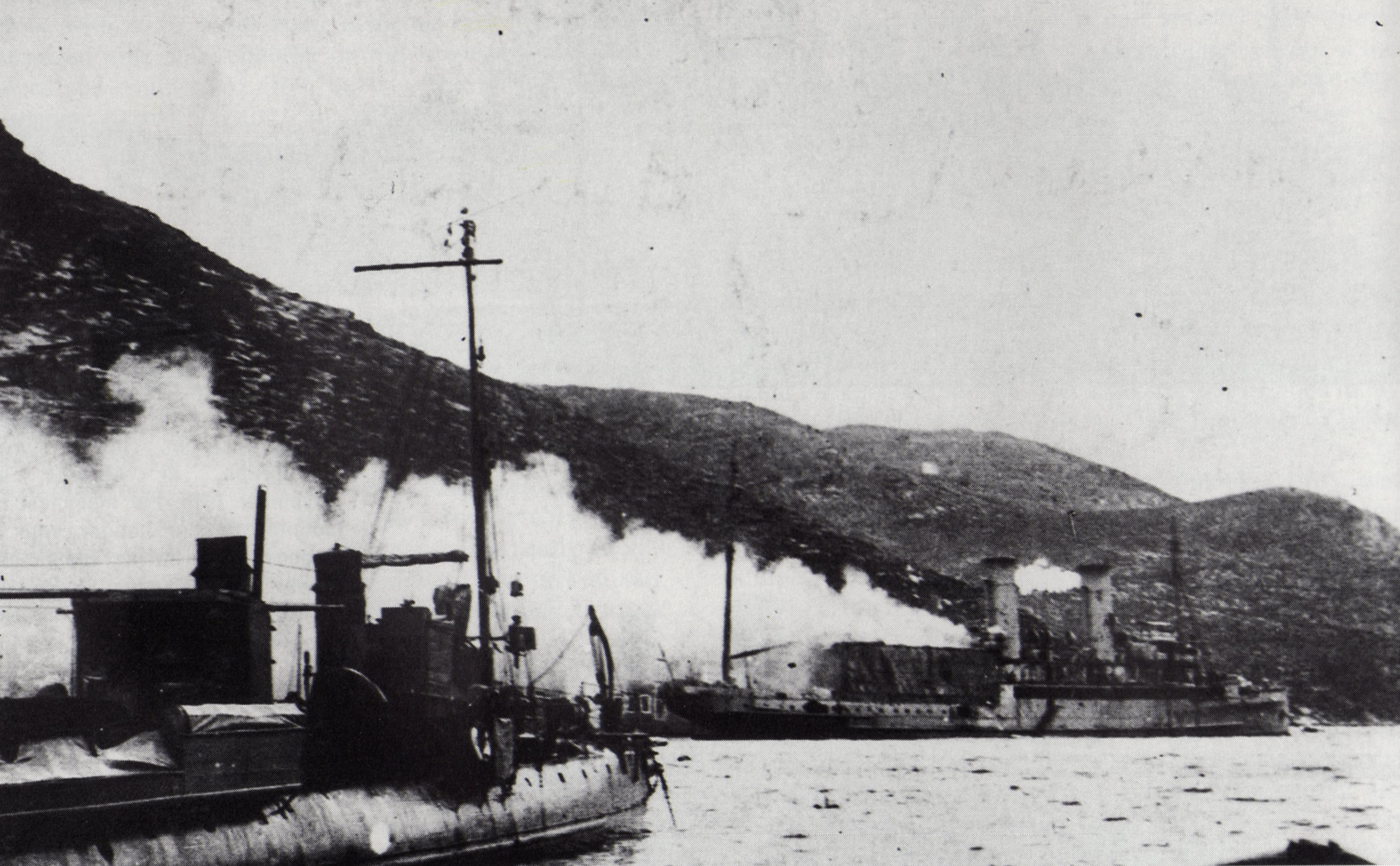
HMS Ben-my-Chree under fire

French troops occupied the Greek island of Kastellorizo, off the southwest coast of Turkey, on 20 December 1916 to use it as an advance base against the Ottomans. Not pleased at the presence of the French, the Ottomans secretly deployed an artillery battery of four 155-millimetre (6.1 in) and twelve 77-millimetre (3.0 in) guns within range of the island. The French commander requested a seaplane carrier to conduct reconnaissance in the area and Ben-my-Chree was sent in response. She arrived on 11 January 1917 and anchored in the harbour which faced the mainland. Ottoman guns opened fire about two hours later, hitting the carrier with their third shot. Subsequent shells disabled her steering and started a fire in her hangar that spread across her upper deck. (See Mustafa Ertuğrul Aker)

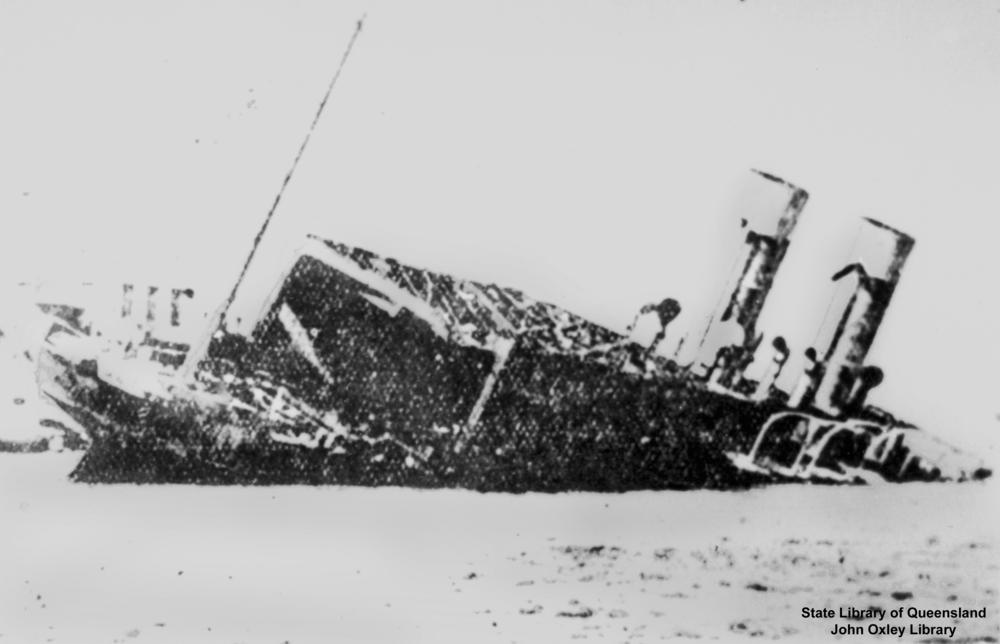
HMS Ben-my-Chree sinking

The crew was ordered to abandon ship after about forty minutes of the bombardment using the only remaining operable motor lifeboat of the three stowed on board. One officer and four ratings were injured, but no one was killed. The Ottomans continued their bombardment for five hours until Ben-my-Chree listed to starboard and sank in shallow water. Later in the day, the captain and the chief engineer returned to the wreck to rescue the ship's mascots, a cat and dog which had both survived the attack.

Ben-my-Chree's wreck remained in place until 15 August 1920 when it was refloated by the salvage ship Vallette. The wreck was immediately beached before the tow to the port of Piraeus began on 4 September. The ship proved to be a constructive total loss and was towed to Venice, Italy, in 1923 to be demolished.

During her short career she operated Sopwith Type 860, Schneider, and Baby aircraft, the Wight Pusher Seaplane, as well as Short Type 830 and Type 184 floatplanes.
