= List of fighter aircraft =

Fighter aircraft
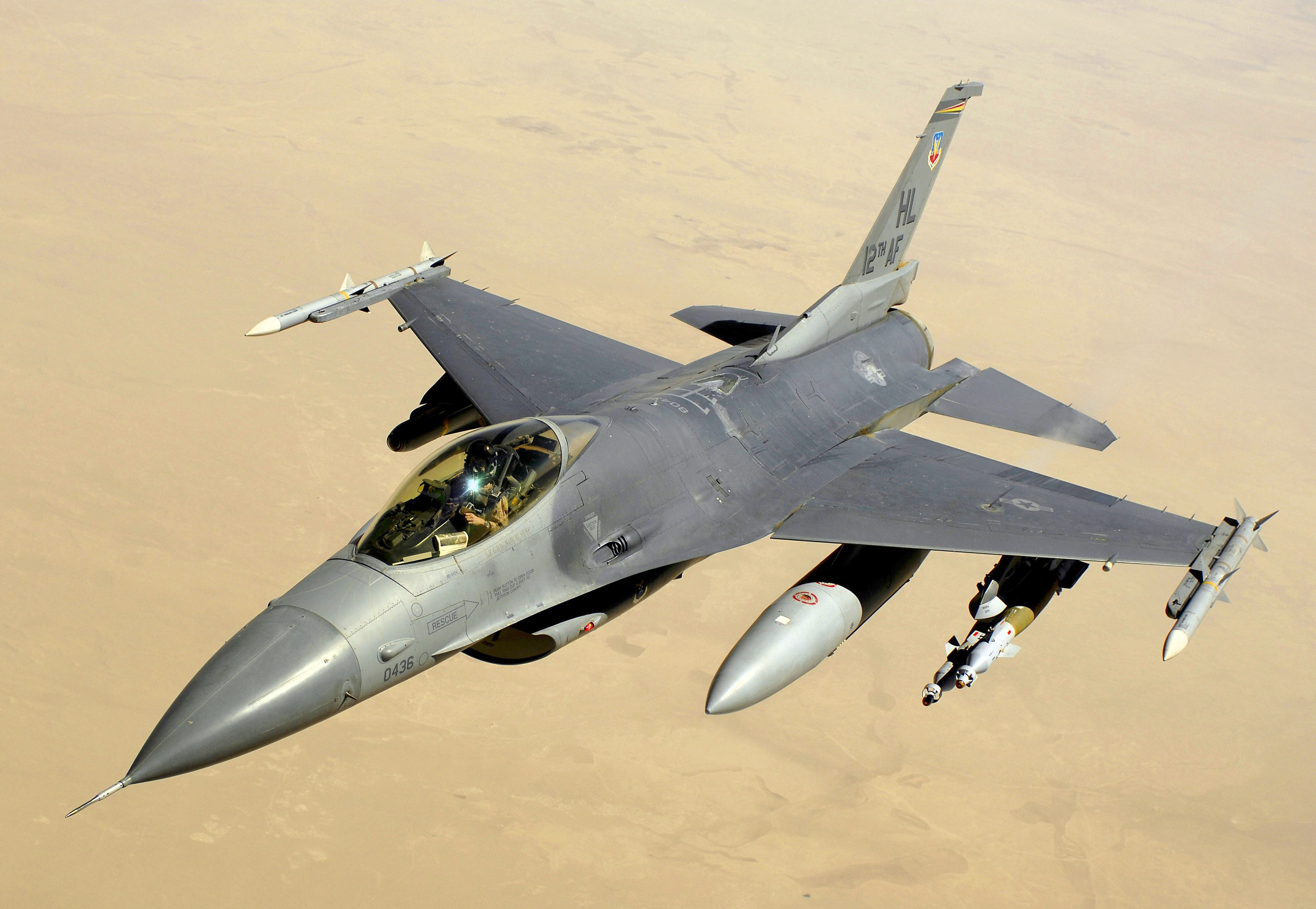
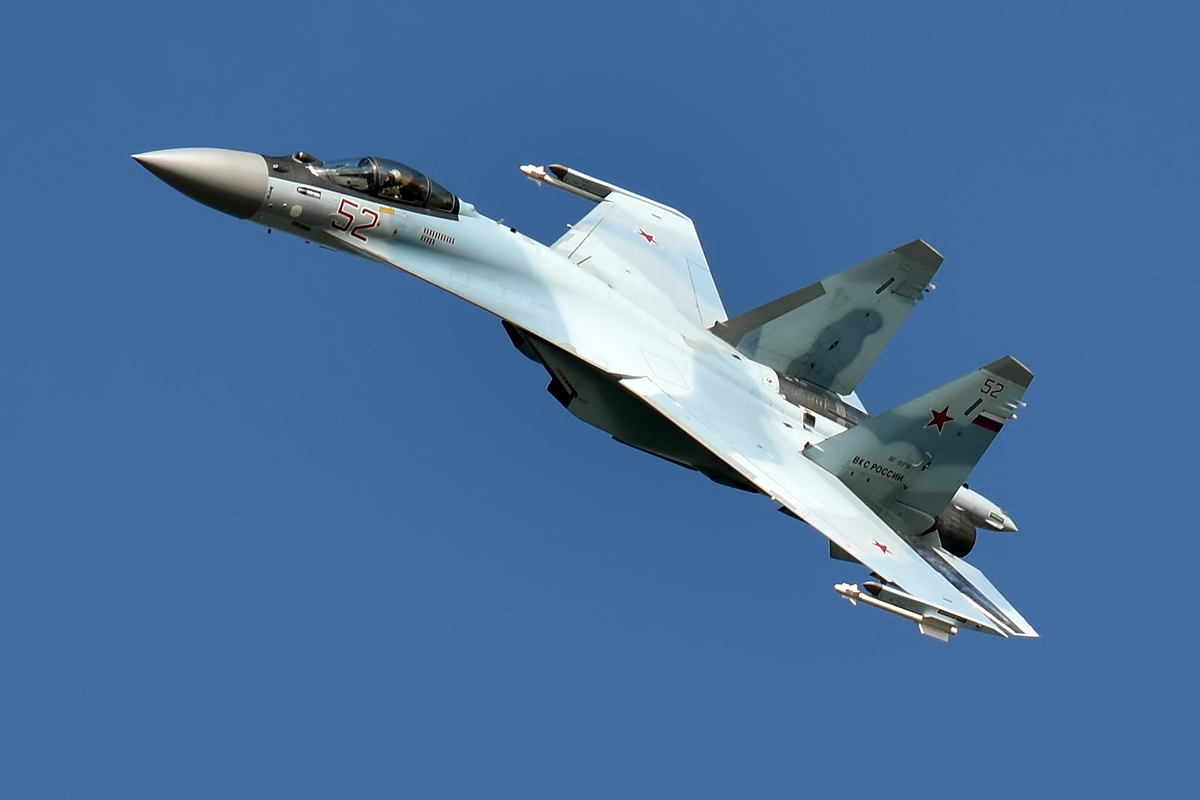
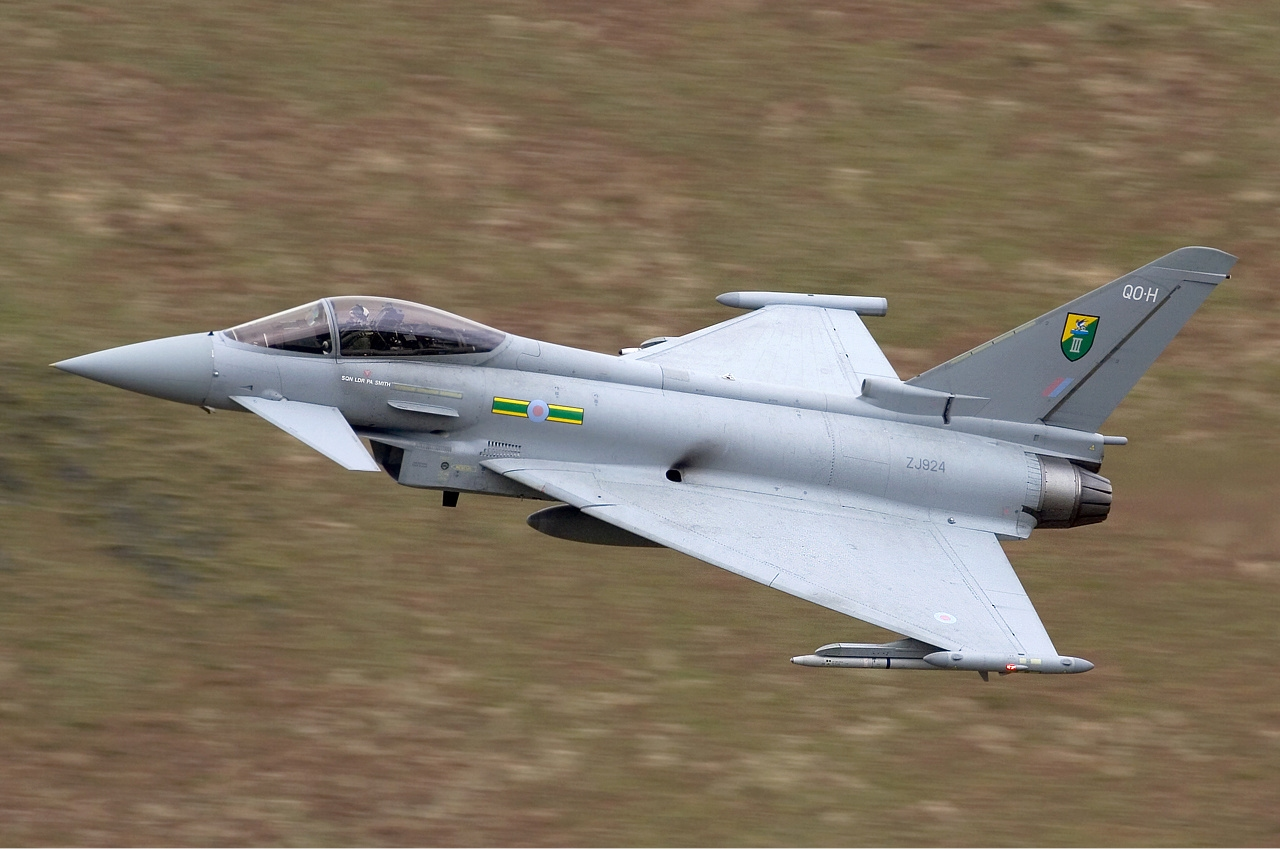
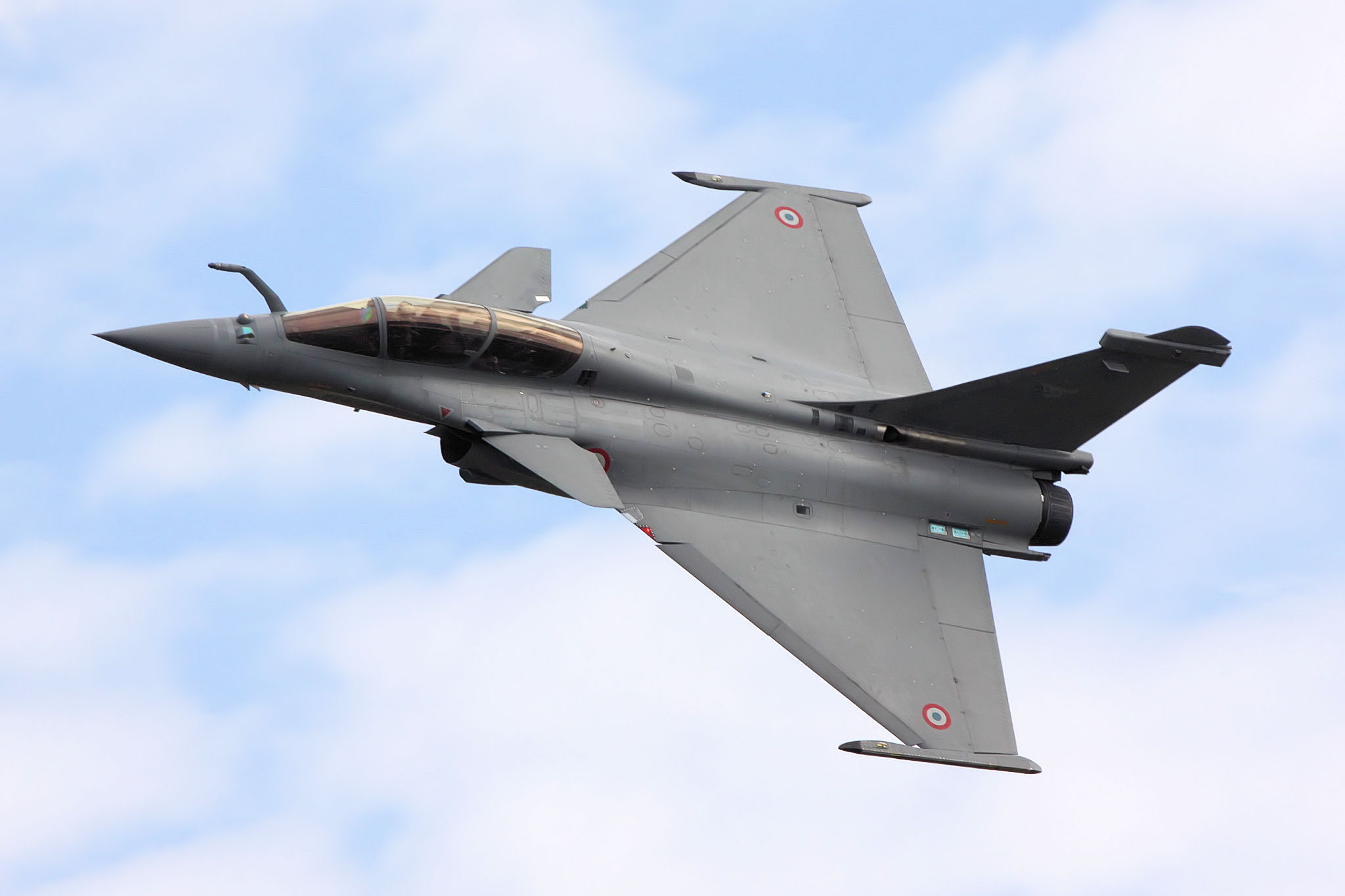
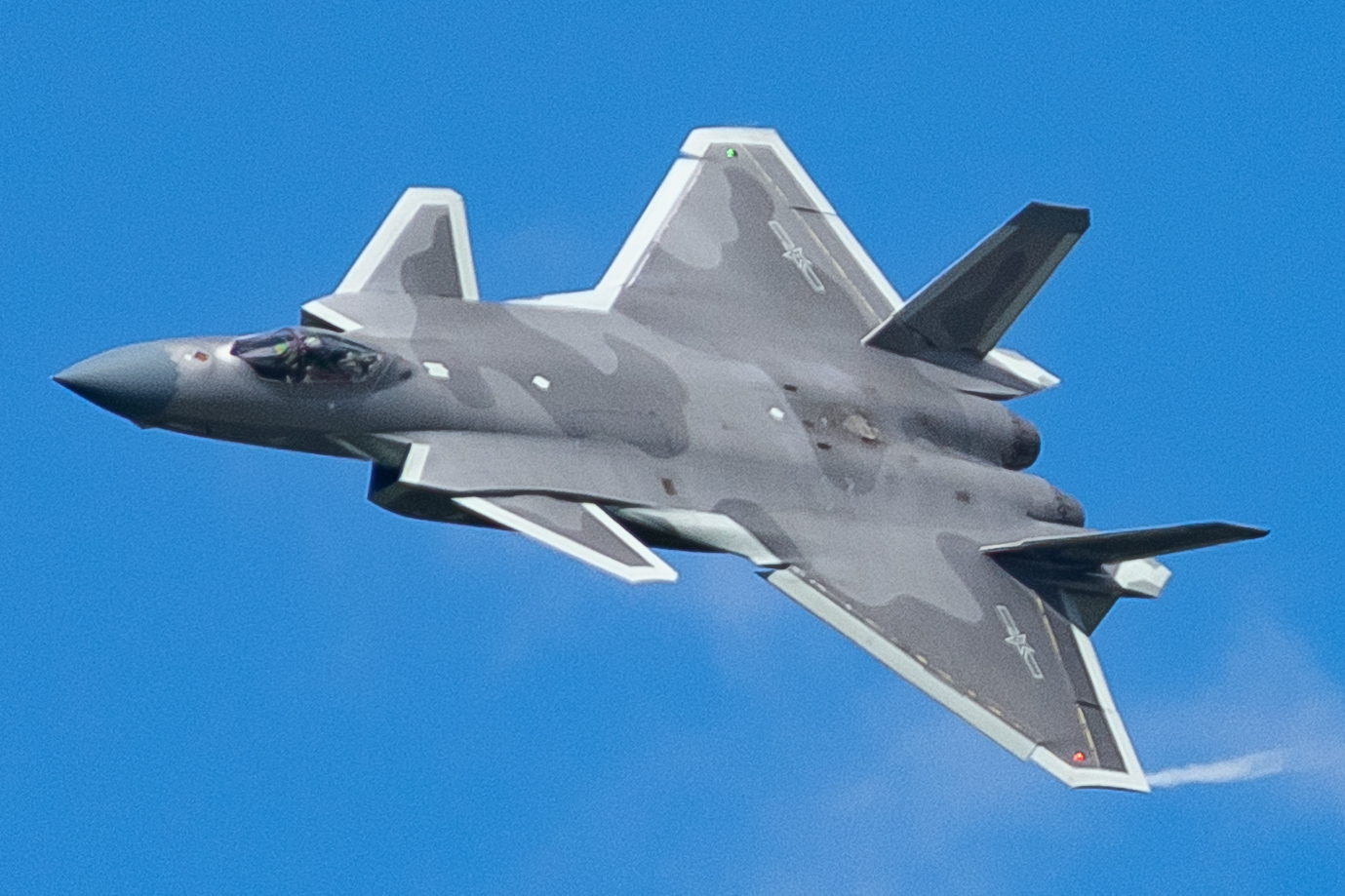
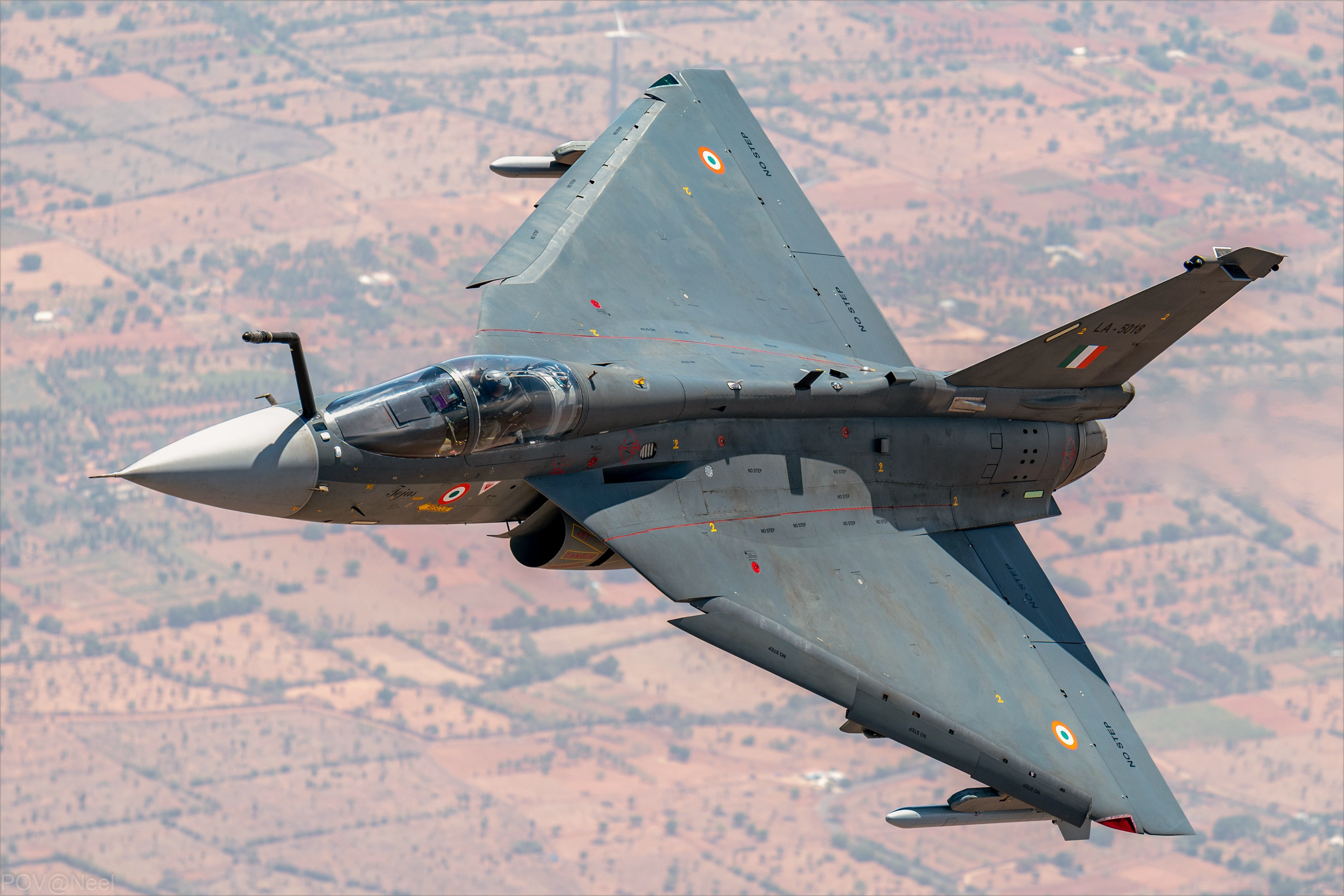
Various fighter aircraft; Top left to right: General Dynamics F-16; Sukhoi Su-35; Eurofighter Typhoon; Dassault Rafale; Chengdu J-20 and HAL Tejas.

Fighter aircraft are military aircraft primarily designed for air-to-air combat. They usually carry various weapons and missiles intended for air strikes and are used to achieve superiority over airspaces. While this list is intended for aircraft meant for aerial warfare, and does not include aircraft used for specific roles such as ground attack aircraft, bombers and trainers, there is some overlap in roles and designs. Multirole combat aircraft are utilized for various roles and fall under multiple categories.

The key performance features of a fighter apart from its firepower include its high speed and maneuverability. Fighter aircraft are sorted into generations, from one to five, based on technological level and advancements. The fighter aircraft are often designated by a specific naming convention based on the country of origin. The name usually consists of a letter prefix followed by a number, though there are names that do not follow this convention.

== List ==
Type	Country	Class	Date	Status	No.	Notes
ACAZ C.2	Belgium	Two-seat fighter	1926	Prototype	1	
Adamoli-Cattani fighter	Italy		1918	Prototype	1	
AD Scout	UK	Zeppelin interceptor	1915	Prototype	4	
AEG D.I, D.II & D.III	Germany		1917	Prototype	3	
AEG Dr.I	Germany		1917	Prototype	1	
Aerfer Ariete	Italy		1958	Prototype	2	
Aerfer Sagittario 2	Italy	Lightweight fighter	1956	Prototype	2	
Aero Ae 02	Czechoslovakia		1920	Prototype	1	
Aero Ae 04	Czechoslovakia		1921	Prototype	1	
Aero A.18	Czechoslovakia		1923	Retired	20	
Aero A.19	Czechoslovakia		1923	Prototype	1	
Aero A.20	Czechoslovakia		1923	Prototype	1	
Aero A.102	Czechoslovakia		1934	Prototype	1	
Aeromarine PG-1	US	Fighter-bomber	1922	Prototype	1	
Aeronautica Umbra Trojani AUT.18	Italy		1939	Prototype	1	
AIDC F-CK-1 Ching-kuo	Taiwan	fighter-bomber	1989	Operational	130	
Airco DH.1	UK	Two-seat fighter	1915	Retired	170 ca.	
Airco DH.2	UK		1915	Retired	453	
Airco DH.5	UK		1916	Retired	552	
Albatros D.I	Germany		1916	Retired	50	
Albatros D.II	Germany		1916	Retired	291	
Albatros D.III	Germany		1916	Retired	1,340	
Albatros D.IV	Germany		1916	Prototype	1	
Albatros D.V & D.Va	Germany		1917	Retired	2,500	
Albatros D.VI	Germany		1918	Prototype	1	
Albatros D.VII	Germany		1917	Prototype	1	
Albatros D.X	Germany		1918	Prototype	1	
Albatros D.XI	Germany		1918	Prototype	2	
Albatros D.XII	Germany		1918	Prototype	1	
Albatros Dr.I	Germany		1917	Prototype	1	
Albatros Dr.II	Germany		1918	Prototype	1	
Albatros L 65	Germany	Fighter-reconnaissance	1925	Prototype	2	
Albatros L 77v	Germany	Fighter-reconnaissance	1928	Prototype	4	
Albatros L 84	Germany	Two-seat fighter	1931	Prototype	5	
Albatros W.4	Germany	Floatplane fighter	1916	Retired	118	
Albree Pigeon-Fraser Pursuit	US		1917	Prototype	3	
Alcock Scout	UK		1917	Prototype	1	
Alekseyev I-211 & 215	USSR		1947	Prototype	3	
Alter A.1	Germany		1917	Prototype	1	
Ambrosini SAI.107 & 207	Italy	Lightweight fighter	1940	Retired	14	
Ambrosini SAI.403	Italy	Lightweight fighter	1943	Prototype	1	
Ambrosini SS.4	Italy		1939	Prototype	1	
Amiot 110	France	Lightweight Jockey fighter	1928	Prototype	2	
Anatra Anadis	Russia		1916	Prototype	1	
ANF Les Mureaux 114	France	Night fighter	1931	Prototype	2	
ANF Les Mureaux 130/Les Mureaux 3 & 4	France	Fighter-reconnaissance	1927	Prototype	2	
ANF Les Mureaux 170	France		1932	Prototype	2	
ANF Les Mureaux 180	France	Two-seat fighter	1935	Prototype	1	
ANF Les Mureaux 190	France	Lightweight fighter	1936	Prototype	1	
Ansaldo A.1 Balilla	Italy		1917	Retired	307	
Ansaldo ISVA	Italy	Floatplane fighter	1917	Retired	50	
Ansaldo SVA	Italy	Fighter-reconnaissance	1917	Retired	1,245	
Arado SD I	Germany		1927	Prototype	2	
Arado SD II	Germany		1929	Prototype	1	
Arado SD III	Germany		1929	Prototype	1	
Arado SSD I	Germany	Floatplane fighter	1930	Prototype	1	
Arado Ar 64	Germany		1930	Retired	20	
Arado Ar 65	Germany		1931	Retired	85	
Arado Ar 67	Germany		1933	Prototype	1	
Arado Ar 68	Germany		1934	Retired	511	
Arado Ar 76	Germany	Lightweight fighter	1934	Retired	189	
Arado Ar 80	Germany		1935	Prototype	3	
Arado Ar 197	Germany	Carrier fighter	1937	Prototype	3	
Arado Ar 240	Germany	Heavy fighter	1940	Prototype	14	
Arado Ar 440	Germany	Heavy fighter	1942	Prototype	5	
Armstrong Whitworth Ara	UK		1919	Prototype	2	
Armstrong Whitworth Armadillo	UK		1918	Prototype	1	
Armstrong Whitworth A.W.16	UK		1930	Retired	18	
Armstrong Whitworth F.K.6	UK	Escort fighter	1916	Prototype	1	
Armstrong Whitworth F.K.9 & 10	UK		1916	Prototype	9	
Armstrong Whitworth Siskin	UK		1919	Retired	272	
Armstrong Whitworth Starling	UK		1927	Prototype	2	
Armstrong Whitworth AW.35 Scimitar	UK		1935	Retired	6	
Army Arsenal Model 3	Japan		1927	Prototype	1	
Arsenal-Delanne 10	France		1941	Prototype	1	
Arsenal VG-30 - 39	France	Lightweight fighter	1938	Retired	40+	
Arsenal VB 10	France	Interceptor	1945	Prototype	6	
Arsenal VG 90	France	Carrier fighter	1949	Prototype	2	
Atlas Cheetah	South Africa	Fighter-bomber	1986	Operational	70	
Austin-Ball A.F.B.1	UK		1917	Prototype	1	
Austin Osprey	UK		1918	Prototype	1	
Austin Greyhound	UK	Two-seat fighter	1919	Prototype	3	
Avia BH-3	Czechoslovakia		1921	Retired	14	
Avia BH-4	Czechoslovakia		1922	Prototype	1	
Avia BH-6	Czechoslovakia		1923	Prototype	1	
Avia BH-7	Czechoslovakia		1923	Prototype	2	
Avia BH-8	Czechoslovakia		1923	Prototype	1	
Avia BH-17	Czechoslovakia		1924	Retired	24	
Avia BH-19	Czechoslovakia		1924	Prototype	2	
Avia BH-21	Czechoslovakia		1925	Retired	184	
Avia BH-23	Czechoslovakia	Night fighter	1926	Prototype	2	
Avia BH-33	Czechoslovakia		1927	Retired	110	
Avia B-34	Czechoslovakia		1932	Retired	14	
Avia B-534	Czechoslovakia		1933	Retired	566	
Avia B-634	Czechoslovakia		1936	Prototype	1	
Avia B-35	Czechoslovakia		1938	Prototype	3	
Avia B-135	Czechoslovakia		1939	Retired	13	
Avia S-199	Czechoslovakia		1947	Retired	603	
Aviatik (Berg) D.I	Austria-Hungary		1917	Retired	700 ca.	
Aviatik (Berg) D.II	Austria-Hungary		1917	Retired	19	
Aviatik D.III	Germany		1917	Prototype	2	
Aviatik D.VI	Germany		1918	Prototype	1	
Aviatik D.VII	Germany		1918	Prototype	1	
Aviméta 88	France	Night fighter	1927	Prototype	1	
Aviotehas PN-3	Estonia	Fighter-reconnaissance	1939	Prototype	1	
AVIS I	Hungary		1933	Prototype	1	
AVIS II	Hungary		1935	Prototype	1	
AVIS III	Hungary		1935	Prototype	3	
AVIS IV	Hungary		1937	Prototype	1	
Avro 504	UK	Bomber/trainer/fighter/Zeppelin interceptor	1913	Retired	11,303	
Avro 523 Pike	UK	Zeppelin interceptor	1916	Prototype	2	
Avro 527	UK	Fighter-reconnaissance	1916	Prototype	1	
Avro 530	UK	Two-seat fighter	1917	Prototype	2	
Avro 531 Spider	UK		1918	Prototype	2	
Avro 566 Avenger	UK		1926	Prototype	1	
Avro 584 Avocet	UK	Fleet fighter	1927	Prototype	2	
Avro Canada CF-100 Canuck	Canada	All-weather interceptor	1950	Retired	692	
Bachem Ba 349	Germany	VTO rocket interceptor	1945	Prototype	36	
BAJ IV	France	Two-seat fighter	1919	Prototype	2	
BAT Bantam	UK		1918	Prototype	15	
BAT Basilisk	UK		1918	Prototype	3	
Baykar Bayraktar Kızılelma	Turkey	Unmanned fighter	2023	Prototype	2	
Beardmore W.B.2	UK		1917	Prototype	3	
Beardmore W.B.III	UK	Shipboard fighter	1917	Retired	100	
Beardmore W.B.IV	UK	Shipboard fighter	1917	Prototype	1	
Beardmore W.B.V	UK	Shipboard fighter	1917	Prototype	2	
Beardmore W.B.XXVI	UK	Two-seat fighter	1925	Prototype	1	
Bell YFM-1 Airacuda	US	Interceptor	1937	Retired	13	
Bell XFL Airabonita	US	Carrier fighter	1940	Prototype	1	
Bell P-39 Airacobra	US		1938	Retired	9,584	
Bell P-59 Airacomet	US		1942	Retired	66	
Bell P-63 Kingcobra	US		1942	Retired	3,303	
Bell XP-77	US	Lightweight fighter	1944	Prototype	2	
Bell XP-83	US	Escort fighter	1945	Prototype	2	
Berkmans Speed Scout	US		1917	Prototype	1	
Bereznyak-Isayev BI-1	USSR	Interceptor rocket	1942	Prototype	9	
Berliner-Joyce XFJ	US	Carrier fighter	1930	Prototype	1	
Berliner-Joyce F2J	US	Carrier fighter	1933	Retired	39	
Berliner-Joyce XF3J	US	Carrier fighter	1934	Prototype	1	
Berliner-Joyce P-16	US		1930	Retired	26	
Bernard SIMB AB 10	France		1924	Prototype	1	
Bernard SIMB AB 12	France		1926	Prototype	1	
Bernard SIMB AB 14	France		1925	Prototype	1	
Bernard 15	France		1926	Prototype	1	
Bernard 20	France		1929	Prototype	1	
Bernard H.52	France	Floatplane fighter	1933	Prototype	2	
Bernard 74 & 75	France		1931	Prototype	2	
Bernard H 110	France	Floatplane fighter	1935	Prototype	1	
Bernard 260	France		1932	Prototype	2	
Bisnovat SK-2	USSR		1940	Prototype	1	
Blackburn F.3	UK		1934	Prototype	1	(Note: Abandoned after problems during taxiing)
Blackburn Firebrand	UK	Torpedo fighter	1942	Retired	193	
Blackburn Firecrest	UK	Strike fighter	1947	Prototype	3	
Blackburn Lincock	UK	Lightweight fighter	1928	Retired	7	
Blackburn Roc	UK	Turret fighter	1938	Retired	136	
Blackburn Skua	UK	Fighter/dive bomber	1937	Retired	192	
Blackburn Triplane	UK	Zeppelin interceptor	1917	Prototype	1	
Blackburn Turcock	UK	Interceptor/fleet fighter	1927	Prototype	1	
Blériot 118	France	Flying-boat fighter	1925	Prototype	1	
Blériot-SPAD S.41	France		1922	Prototype	1	
Blériot-SPAD S.51	France		1924	Retired	54+	
Blériot-SPAD S.60	France	Two-seat fighter	1926	Prototype	3	
Blériot-SPAD S.61	France		1923	Retired	380+	
Blériot-SPAD S.70	France		1927	Prototype	1	
Blériot-SPAD S.71	France		1923	Prototype	1	
Blériot-SPAD S.72	France		1923	Prototype	1	
Blériot-SPAD S.81	France		1923	Retired	87+	
Blériot-SPAD S.91	France	Lightweight Jockey fighter	1927	Prototype	4	
Blériot-SPAD S.510	France		1933	Retired	61	
Blériot-SPAD S.710	France		1937	Prototype	1	
Bloch MB.150-157	France		1937	Retired	663	
Blohm & Voss BV 40	Germany	Interceptor glider	1944	Prototype	7	
Blohm & Voss BV 155	Germany	High-altitude interceptor	1944	Prototype	3	
Boeing FB	US	Carrier fighter	1923	Retired	44	
Boeing F2B	US	Carrier fighter	1926	Retired	33	
Boeing F3B	US	Carrier fighter	1928	Retired	74	
Boeing F4B	US	Carrier fighter	1928	Retired	187	
Boeing XF5B	US	Carrier fighter	1930	Prototype	1	
Boeing XF6B	US	Fighter-bomber	1933	Prototype	1	
Boeing XF7B	US	Carrier fighter	1933	Prototype	1	
Boeing XF8B	US	Carrier fighter	1944	Prototype	3	
Boeing PW-9	US		1923	Retired	114	
Boeing XP-4	US		1927	Prototype	1	
Boeing XP-7	US		1928	Prototype	1	
Boeing XP-8	US		1928	Prototype	1	
Boeing XP-9	US		1930	Prototype	1	
Boeing P-12	US		1929	Retired	366	
Boeing XP-15	US		1930	Prototype	1	
Boeing P-26 Peashooter	US		1932	Retired	151	
Boeing P-29	US		1934	Prototype	3	
Boeing Model 100	US		1929	Retired	9	
Boeing Model 218	US		1929	Retired	1	
Boeing Model 256	US		1932	Retired	14	
Boeing Model 267	US		1933	Retired	9	
Boeing F/A-18E/F Super Hornet	US	Carrier fighter-bomber	1995	Operational	608	
Boeing X-32	US		2000	Prototype	2	
Bolkhovitinov I-1	USSR	Fighter-bomber	1940	Prototype	1	
Borel-Boccacio Type 3000	France	Two-seat fighter	1919	Prototype	1	
Borel C.A.P. 2	France	High-altitude fighter	1920	Prototype	1	
Borovkov-Florov I-207	USSR		1937	Prototype	8	
Boulton & Paul Bobolink	UK		1918	Prototype	1	
Boulton Paul Defiant	UK	Turret fighter	1937	Retired	1,064	
Boulton & Paul Partridge	UK		1928	Prototype	1	
Breda Ba.27	Italy		1933	Retired	14	
Breguet BUC/BLC	France	Escort fighter	1915	Prototype	32 ca.	
Breguet LE Laboratoire Eiffel	France		1918	Prototype	1	
Breguet Taon	France	Strike fighter	1957	Prototype	2	
Breguet 17	France	Night fighter	1918	Retired	100	
Brewster F2A Buffalo	US	Carrier fighter	1937	Retired	509	
Bristol Badger	UK	Fighter-reconnaissance	1919	Prototype	5	
Bristol Bagshot	UK	Heavy fighter	1927	Prototype	1	
Bristol Beaufighter	UK	Strike fighter	1939	Retired	5,928	
Bristol Blenheim	UK	Night fighter	1935	Retired	4,422	(Note: Production total includes non-fighter variants)
Bristol Bulldog	UK		1928	Retired	443	
Bristol Bullfinch	UK		1922	Prototype	3	
Bristol Bullpup	UK		1928	Prototype	1	
Bristol F.2 Fighter	UK	Two-seat fighter	1916	Retired	5,329	
Bristol Jupiter Fighter	UK		1923	Prototype	3	
Bristol M.1 Bullet	UK		1916	Retired	130	
Bristol Scout	UK		1914	Retired	374	
Bristol Scout F	UK		1918	Prototype	3	
Bristol T.T.A.	UK	Zeppelin interceptor	1916	Prototype	2	
Bristol Type 101	UK	Two-seat fighter	1927	Prototype	1	
Bristol Type 123	UK		1934	Prototype	1	
Bristol Type 133	UK		1934	Prototype	1	
Bristol Type 146	UK		1938	Prototype	1	
British Aerospace Sea Harrier	UK	Carrier V/STOL fighter	1978	Retired	98	
Burgess HT-B/HT-2	US		1917	Retired	8	
Buscaylet-Bechereau BB.2	France		1924	Prototype	1	
Buscaylet-de Monge 5/2	France		1923	Prototype	1	
CAC Boomerang	Australia		1942	Retired	250	
CAC CA-15 Kangaroo	Australia		1946	Prototype	1	
CAC Wirraway	Australia	Emergency fighter/trainer	1935	Retired	755	
Canadian Car and Foundry FDB-1	Canada		1938	Prototype	1	
Caproni Ca.20	Italy		1914	Prototype	1	
Caproni Ca.70 & 71	Italy	Night fighter	1925	Prototype	2	
Caproni Ca.114	Italy		1933	Retired	36	
Caproni Ca.165	Italy		1938	Prototype	1	
Caproni Ca.301	Italy		1934	Prototype	2	
Caproni Ca.331	Italy	Night fighter	1942	Prototype	2	
Caproni Ca.335	Italy	Fighter-bomber	1939	Prototype	1	
Caproni CH.1	Italy		1935	Prototype	1	
Caproni Vizzola F.4	Italy		1940	Prototype	1	
Caproni Vizzola F.5	Italy		1939	Retired	14	
Caproni Vizzola F.6	Italy		1941	Prototype	1	
Caudron O	France		1917	Prototype	1	
Caudron C.714	France	Lightweight fighter	1936	Retired	90 ca.	
Caudron R.11	France	Escort fighter	1916	Retired	270 ca.	
Caudron R.12	France	Escort fighter	1918	Prototype	2	
Caudron R.14	France	Escort fighter	1918	Prototype	1	
Caudron-Renault CR.760	France	Lightweight fighter	1940	Prototype	1	
Caudron-Renault CR.770	France	Lightweight fighter	1940	Prototype	1	
Chengdu FC-1 Xiaolong/PAC JF-17 Thunder	China, Pakistan	Lightweight fighter-bomber	2003	Operational	180+	
Chengdu J-7	China	Fighter-bomber	1966	Operational	2,400+	
Chengdu J-10	China	Lightweight fighter-bomber	1998	Operational	400+	
Chengdu J-20	China	Stealth fighter	2011	Operational	300+	
Chengdu J-36	China	Stealth fighter	2024	Prototype	1	
Christmas Bullet	US		1919	Prototype	2	
Chu XP-0	China		1943	Prototype	1	
Comte AC-1	Switzerland		1927	Prototype	1	
Consolidated PB-2/P-30	US	Two-seat fighter	1934	Retired	60	
Consolidated Vultee XP-81	US	Escort fighter	1945	Prototype	2	
Convair XF-92	US	Interceptor	1948	Prototype	1	
Convair F-102 Delta Dagger	US	Interceptor	1953	Retired	1,000	
Convair F-106 Delta Dart	US	Interceptor	1956	Retired	342	
Convair XFY Pogo	US	VTOL fighter	1954	Prototype	1	
Convair F2Y Sea Dart	US	Flying-boat jet fighter	1953	Prototype	5	
Courtois-Suffit Lescop CSL-1	France		1918	Prototype	1	
Curtiss 18	US		1918	Retired	5	
Curtiss HA	US	Floatplane fighter	1918	Prototype	3	
Curtiss TS-1 and F4C-1	US	Carrier fighter	1922	Retired	46	
Curtiss BF2C Goshawk	US	Carrier fighter-bomber	1933	Retired	166	
Curtiss F6C Hawk	US	Carrier fighter	1923	Retired	75	
Curtiss F7C Seahawk	US	Carrier fighter	1927	Retired	17	
Curtiss F8C Falcon/Helldiver	US	Carrier fighter-bomber	1928	Retired	153	
Curtiss F9C Sparrowhawk	US	Parasite fighter	1931	Retired	7	
Curtiss XF10C Helldiver	US	Fighter-bomber	1932	Prototype	1	
Curtiss F11C Goshawk	US	Carrier fighter	1932	Retired	30	
Curtiss F12C	US	Carrier fighter-bomber	1933	Prototype	1	
Curtiss XF13C	US	Carrier fighter	1934	Prototype	1	
Curtiss XF14C	US	Carrier fighter	1943	Prototype	1	
Curtiss XF15C	US	Carrier fighter	1945	Prototype	3	
Curtiss PW-8	US		1923	Retired	28	
Curtiss P-1 Hawk	US		1925	Retired	146	
Curtiss P-2 Hawk	US		1925	Retired	5	
Curtiss P-3 Hawk/XP-21	US		1928	Retired	6	
Curtiss P-5 Superhawk	US		1928	Retired	5	
Curtiss P-6 Hawk	US		1927	Retired	70	
Curtiss XP-10	US		1928	Prototype	1	
Curtiss YP-20	US		1928	Prototype	1	
Curtiss XP-31 Swift	US		1933	Prototype	1	
Curtiss P-36 Hawk	US		1935	Retired	1,115	
Curtiss XP-37	US		1939	Prototype	14	
Curtiss P-40 Warhawk	US		1938	Retired	13,738	
Curtiss XP-46	US		1941	Prototype	2	
Curtiss XP-53 & P-60	US		1941	Prototype	5	
Curtiss XP-62	US	Interceptor	1943	Prototype	1	
Curtiss-Wright CW-21	US	Lightweight fighter	1938	Retired	62	
Curtiss-Wright XP-55 Ascender	US		1943	Prototype	3	
Curtiss-Wright XF-87 Blackhawk	US	All-weather interceptor	1948	Prototype	2	
Daimler D.I	Germany		1918	Prototype	6	
Daimler L11	Germany		1918	Prototype	1	
Daimler L14	Germany		1919	Prototype	1	
Dassault Balzac V	France	VTOL fighter	1962	Prototype	1	
Dassault Étendard II	France		1956	Prototype	1	
Dassault Étendard IV	France	Strike fighter	1958	Retired	90	
Dassault Étendard VI	France	Fighter-bomber	1957	Prototype	2	
Dassault Mirage III	France	Interceptor	1956	Retired	1,422	
Dassault Mirage IIIV	France	VTOL fighter	1965	Prototype	2	
Dassault Mirage 5 & 50	France	Fighter-bomber	1967	Retired	582	
Dassault Mirage 2000	France	Lightweight fighter-bomber	1978	Operational	601	
Dassault Mirage 4000	France	Interceptor/fighter-bomber	1979	Prototype	1	
Dassault Mirage F1	France	Fighter-bomber	1966	Operational	720	
Dassault Mirage F2	France	Fighter-bomber	1966	Prototype	1	
Dassault Mirage G	France		1967	Prototype	3	
Dassault Mystère	France	Fighter-bomber	1951	Retired	166	
Dassault Mystère IV	France	Fighter-bomber	1952	Retired	411	
Dassault Ouragan	France	Fighter-bomber	1949	Retired	362	
Dassault Rafale	France	Multirole fighter	1986	Operational	316	
Dassault Super Mystère	France	Fighter-bomber	1955	Retired	180	
Dassault-Breguet Super Étendard	France	Strike fighter	1974	Retired	85	
Dayton-Wright XPS-1	US		1923	Prototype	3	
de Bruyère C.1	France		1917	Prototype	1	
de Havilland Dormouse	UK		1924	Prototype	1	
de Havilland DH.77	UK	Interceptor	1929	Prototype	1	
de Havilland Hornet/Sea Hornet	UK	Heavy fighter	1944	Retired	383	
de Havilland Mosquito	UK	Fighter-bomber/night fighter	1941	Retired	7,781	
de Havilland Sea Venom	UK	Carrier fighter-bomber	1951	Retired	349	
de Havilland DH.110 Sea Vixen	UK	Carrier fighter	1951	Retired	145	
de Havilland Vampire/Sea Vampire	UK		1943	Retired	3,268	
de Havilland Venom	UK	Fighter-bomber	1949	Retired	1,431	
De Marçay 2	France		1918	Prototype	1	
De Marçay 4	France		1923	Prototype	1	
de Monge M-101	France, Netherlands	Two-seat fighter	1924	Prototype	1	
Descamps 27	France		1918	Prototype	1	
Dewoitine D.1	France		1922	Retired	225	
Dewoitine D.8	France		1923	Prototype	1	
Dewoitine D.9	France		1924	Retired	157	
Dewoitine D.12	France		1925	Prototype	2	
Dewoitine D.15	France		1924	Prototype	1	
Dewoitine D.19	France		1925	Retired	5	
Dewoitine D.21 & D.53	France		1925	Retired	100	
Dewoitine D.25	France	Two-seat fighter	1926	Retired	5	
Dewoitine D.27	France		1928	Retired	93	
Dewoitine D.371	France		1931	Retired	87	
Dewoitine D.500 & D.501	France		1932	Retired	259	
Dewoitine D.510	France		1934	Retired	120	
Dewoitine D.503/D.511	France		1935	Prototype	1	
Dewoitine D.513 & 514	France		1936	Prototype	2	
Dewoitine D.520	France		1938	Retired	900	
Dewoitine D.535	France		1932	Prototype	1	
Dewoitine D.560 & D.570	France		1932	Prototype	1	
DFW Floh	Germany		1915	Prototype	1	
Díaz Type C	Spain		1919	Prototype	1	
Dobi-III	Lithuania		1924	Prototype	1	
Doflug D-3802	Switzerland		1944	Retired	12	
Doflug D-3803	Switzerland		1947	Prototype	1	
Dornier Do H	Germany		1922	Prototype	4	
Dornier Do 10	Germany	Two-seat fighter	1931	Prototype	2	
Dornier Do 17	Germany	Night fighter	1934	Retired	2,139	
Dornier Do 215	Germany	Night fighter	1938	Retired	105	
Dornier Do 217	Germany	Night fighter	1938	Retired	1,925	
Dornier Do 335	Germany	Heavy fighter	1943	Retired	37	
Douglas P-70 Havoc	US	Night fighter	1939	Retired	7,478	
Douglas XA-26A	US	Night fighter	1942	Prototype	1	
Douglas XFD	US	Carrier fighter	1933	Prototype	1	
Douglas F3D Skyknight	US	Carrier night fighter	1948	Retired	265	
Douglas F4D Skyray	US	Carrier fighter	1951	Retired	422	
Douglas F5D Skylancer	US	Carrier fighter	1956	Prototype	4	
Ducrot SLD	Italy		1918	Prototype	1	
Dufaux avions-canon	Switzerland	Cannon fighter	1917	Prototype	1	
Dufaux C.1	Switzerland		1916	Prototype	1	
Eberhart XFG & XF2G	US	Carrier fighter	1927	Prototype	1	
EFW N-20	Switzerland		1952	Prototype	1	
ENAER Pantera	Chile	Fighter-bomber	1988	Operational	15	
Engels MI	Russia		1916	Retired	4	
Engineering Division PW-1	US		1921	Prototype	1	
Engineering Division TP-1	US	Two-seat fighter	1923	Prototype	1	
English Electric Lightning	UK	Interceptor	1954	Retired	337	
Euler D.I	Germany		1916	Retired	75	
Euler D.II	Germany		1917	Retired	30	
Euler Dr 1	Germany		1917	Prototype	1	
Euler Dr 2	Germany		1917	Prototype	1	
Euler Dr 3	Germany		1917	Prototype	1	
Euler Gelber Hund	Germany		1915	Prototype	1	
Euler Vierdecker	Germany		1917	Prototype	1	
Euler Versuchszweisitzer	Germany	Two-seat fighter	1915	Prototype	1	
Eurofighter Typhoon	UK, Germany, Italy, Spain	Fighter-bomber	1994	Operational	571	
F/A-XX	US	Stealth multirole fighter	2012	In Development		
Fairey F.2	UK	Long-range fighter	1917	Prototype	1	
Fairey Fantôme	UK		1935	Prototype	4	
Fairey Fleetwing	UK	Fleet fighter	1929	Prototype	1	
Fairey Flycatcher	UK		1922	Retired	196	
Fairey Firefly	UK	Fleet fighter	1941	Retired	1,702	
Fairey Firefly II	UK		1929	Retired	91	
Fairey Fox	UK	Fighter-reconnaissance	1929	Retired	112 ca.	
Fairey Fulmar	UK	Fleet fighter	1940	Retired	600	
Fairey Hamble Baby	UK	Floatplane fighter	1916	Retired	180	
Fairey Pintail	UK	Floatplane fighter	1921	Retired	6	
Farman HF.30	France	Two-seat fighter	1916	Prototype	3	
Farman F.31	France	Two-seat fighter	1918	Prototype	1	
FBA Ca2 Avion-Canon	France	Cannon fighter	1916	Prototype	1	
FFA P-16	Switzerland		1955	Prototype	5	
FFVS 22	Sweden		1942	Retired	198	
FMA I.Ae. 27 Pulqui I	Argentina		1947	Prototype	1	
FMA I.Ae. 30 Ñancú	Argentina	Escort fighter	1948	Prototype	1	
FMA I.Ae. 33 Pulqui II	Argentina		1950	Prototype	5	
Fiat CR.1/CR.2/CR.5/CR.10	Italy		1924	Retired	251	
Fiat CR.20	Italy		1926	Retired	735	
Fiat CR.25	Italy	Heavy fighter	1937	Retired	10	
Fiat CR.30	Italy		1932	Retired	176	
Fiat CR.32/CR.33/CR.40/CR.41	Italy		1933	Retired	1,306	
Fiat CR.42 Falco	Italy		1938	Retired	1,817	
Fiat G.50 Freccia	Italy		1937	Retired	791	
Fiat G.55/G.56/G.59 Centauro	Italy		1942	Retired	349	
Fiat G.91	Italy	Strike fighter	1956	Retired	770	
Fisher P-75 Eagle	US	Heavy fighter	1943	Prototype	13	
Focke-Wulf Fw 57	Germany	Fighter-bomber	1936	Prototype	3	
Focke-Wulf Fw 159	Germany		1935	Prototype	2	
Focke-Wulf Fw 187	Germany	Heavy fighter	1937	Prototype	9	
Focke-Wulf Fw 190	Germany	Fighter-bomber	1939	Retired	20,000+	
Focke-Wulf Ta 152	Germany	High-altitude interceptor	1944	Retired	49	
Focke-Wulf Ta 154	Germany	Night fighter	1943	Retired	50	
Fokker D.I	Germany		1916	Retired	144	
Fokker D.II	Germany		1916	Retired	177	
Fokker D.III	Germany		1916	Retired	210	
Fokker D.IV	Germany		1916	Retired	44	
Fokker D.V	Germany		1916	Retired	216	
Fokker D.VI	Germany		1918	Retired	59	
Fokker D.VII & V.34 & 36	Germany		1918	Retired	3,300	
Fokker D.IX/PW-6	Netherlands		1921	Prototype	1	
Fokker D.X	Netherlands		1918	Retired	11	
Fokker D.XI/PW-7	Netherlands		1923	Retired	117	
Fokker D.XII	Netherlands		1924	Prototype	1	
Fokker D.XIII	Netherlands		1924	Retired	53	
Fokker D.XIV	Netherlands		1925	Prototype	1	
Fokker D.XVI	Netherlands		1929	Retired	22	
Fokker D.XVII	Netherlands		1931	Prototype	11	
Fokker D.XXI	Netherlands		1936	Retired	148	
Fokker D.XXIII	Netherlands		1939	Prototype	1	
Fokker DC.I	Netherlands		1923	Retired	10	
Fokker Dr.I	Germany		1917	Retired	320	
Fokker E.I	Germany		1915	Retired	54	
Fokker E.II	Germany		1915	Retired	49	
Fokker E.III	Germany		1915	Retired	249	
Fokker E.IV	Germany		1915	Retired	49	
Fokker E.V/D.VIII	Germany		1918	Retired	381 ca.	
Fokker G.I	Netherlands		1937	Retired	63	
Fokker K.I	Germany	Heavy fighter	1915	Prototype	1	
Fokker M.16/B.III	Germany		1915	Retired	28	
Fokker PW-5	Netherlands		1921	Retired	12	
Fokker V.1	Germany		1916	Prototype	1	
Fokker V.2	Germany		1916	Prototype	1	
Fokker V.3	Germany		1916	Prototype	1	
Fokker V.4	Germany		1916	Prototype	1	
Fokker V.6	Germany		1917	Prototype	1	
Fokker V.7	Germany		1918	Prototype	5	
Fokker V.8	Germany		1917	Prototype	1	
Fokker V.17, V.20, V.23 & V.25	Germany		1917	Prototype	4	
Fokker V.27 & V.37	Germany		1918	Prototype	2	
Folland Gnat	UK	Lightweight fighter	1955	Retired	449	
Folland Midge	UK	Lightweight fighter	1954	Prototype	1	
Friedrichshafen FF.43	Germany		1916	Prototype	1	
Friedrichshafen FF.46	Germany		1916	Prototype	1	
Friedrichshafen FF.54	Germany		1917	Prototype	1 ca.	
FVM J 23	Sweden		1923	Retired	5	
FVM J 24	Sweden		1924	Prototype	2	
Gabardini G.8	Italy		1923	Prototype	1+	
Gabardini G.9	Italy		1923	Prototype	1+	
Galvin HC	France	Floatplane fighter	1919	Prototype	1	
Geest Fighter	Germany		1917	Prototype	1	
General Aviation XFA	US		1932	Prototype	1	
General Dynamics F-16 Fighting Falcon	US	Multirole fighter	1974	Operational	4,500	
General Dynamics F-16XL	US	Strike fighter	1982	Prototype	2	
General Dynamics/Grumman F-111B	US	Interceptor	1965	Prototype	7	
Germania DB	Germany	Two-seat fighter	1915	Prototype	1	
Germania JM	Germany		1916	Prototype	1	
Gloster E.1/44	UK	Jet	1948	Prototype	3	
Gloster F.5/34	UK		1937	Prototype	2	
Gloster F.9/37	UK		1939	Prototype	2	
Gloster Gambet	UK, Japan		1927	Retired	151	
Gloster Gamecock	UK		1925	Retired	98	
Gloster Gauntlet	UK		1933	Retired	246	
Gloster Gladiator & Sea Gladiator	UK		1934	Retired	747	
Gloster Gnatsnapper	UK	Carrier fighter	1928	Prototype	2	
Gloster Goldfinch	UK		1927	Prototype	1	
Gloster Gorcock	UK		1925	Prototype	3	
Gloster Grebe	UK		1923	Retired	133	
Gloster Grouse	UK		1923	Prototype	1	
Gloster Guan	UK		1926	Prototype	2	
Gloster Javelin	UK	All-weather interceptor	1951	Retired	436	
Gloster Mars, Nightjar & Sparrowhawk	UK		1921	Retired	91	
Gloster Meteor	UK	Jet	1943	Retired	3,947	
Goodyear F2G Corsair	US		1945	Prototype	10	
Gorbunov 105	USSR		1943	Prototype	10	
Gourdou-Leseurre Type A	France		1918	Prototype	1	
Gourdou-Leseurre Type B, GL.2/21/22/23/24	France		1918	Retired	136+	
Gourdou-Leseurre GL.30 series	France		1920	Retired	500+	
Gourdou-Leseurre GL.40, 410 & 450	France		1932	Prototype	3	
Gourdou-Leseurre GL.50	France		1922	Prototype	2	
Gourdou-Leseurre GL.482	France		1933	Prototype	1	
Grigorovich I-1	USSR		1924	Prototype	1	
Grigorovich I-2 & I-2bis	USSR		1924	Retired	211	
Grigorovich DI-3	USSR		1931	Prototype	1	
Grigorovich I-Z	USSR		1931	Retired	73	
Grigorovich IP-1	USSR	Cannon fighter	1935	Retired	90	
Grigorovich IP-4	USSR	Cannon fighter	1934	Prototype	1	
Grumman FF/G-5/G-23 Goblin	US	Carrier fighter	1931	Retired	85	
Grumman F2F	US	Carrier fighter	1933	Retired	55	
Grumman F3F	US	Carrier fighter	1935	Retired	147	
Grumman F4F Wildcat	US	Carrier fighter	1937	Retired	7,885	(Note: Includes FM & FM-2)
Grumman XF5F Skyrocket	US	Carrier interceptor	1940	Prototype	1	
Grumman F6F Hellcat	US	Carrier fighter	1942	Retired	12,275	
Grumman F7F Tigercat	US	Carrier heavy fighter	1943	Retired	364	
Grumman F8F Bearcat	US	Carrier fighter-bomber	1944	Retired	1,266	
Grumman F9F Panther	US	Carrier fighter-bomber	1947	Retired	1,382	
Grumman F-9 Cougar	US	Carrier fighter	1951	Retired	1,392	
Grumman XF10F Jaguar	US	Carrier fighter	1952	Prototype	1	
Grumman F-11 Tiger	US	Carrier fighter	1954	Retired	200	
Grumman F-14 Tomcat	US	Carrier interceptor	1970	Operational	712	
Grumman XP-50	US		1941	Prototype	1	
Grumman GG	US		1934	Prototype	1	
Grumman SF/G-6	US	Carrier fighter	1932	Retired	35	
Gudkov GU-1	USSR		1943	Prototype	1	
Gudkov GU-82	USSR		1941	Prototype	1	
Guizhou JL-9	China		2003	Operational	12+	
Häfeli DH-4	Switzerland		1918	Prototype	1	
HAL Ajeet	India/UK	Lightweight fighter	1976	Retired	89	
HAL HF-24 Marut	India	Fighter-bomber	1961	Retired	147	
HAL Tejas Mk1/Mk1A	India	Lightweight multirole fighter	2001	Operational	51	
HAL Tejas Mk2	India	Multirole fighter	2019	In Development	0	
HAL TEDBF	India	Carrier multirole fighter	2020	In Development	0	
Infoglobal I-22 Sikatan	Indonesia	stealth multirole fighter	2022	In Development	0	
HAL AMCA	India	Stealth Multirole Fighter	2019	In Development	0	
Halberstadt D.I	Germany		1915	Prototype	2	
Halberstadt D.II - D.V	Germany		1915	Retired	85	
Hall XFH	US	Carrier fighter	1929	Prototype	1	
Handley Page Type S	UK		1923	Prototype	2	
Hannover CL.II	Germany	Escort fighter	1917	Retired	439	
Hanriot HD.1	France		1916	Retired	1,200	
Hanriot HD.2	France	Floatplane fighter	1917	Retired	140 ca.	
Hanriot HD.3	France		1917	Retired	90 ca.	
Hanriot HD.5	France	Two-seat fighter	1918	Prototype	1	
Hanriot HD.6	France	Two-seat fighter	1919	Prototype	1	
Hanriot HD.7	France		1918	Prototype	1	
Hanriot HD.8	France		1918	Prototype	1	
Hanriot HD.12	France		1921	Prototype	1	
Hanriot HD.15	France	High-altitude fighter	1922	Prototype	4	
Hanriot HD.20	France	Shipboard fighter	1923	Prototype	1	
Hanriot H.26	France		1923	Prototype	1	
Hanriot H.31	France		1925	Prototype	1	
Hanriot H.33	France	Two-seat fighter	1926	Prototype	1	
Hanriot H.110 & H.115	France		1933	Prototype	1	
Hanriot H.220, H.220-2 & SNCAC NC-600	France	Heavy fighter	1937	Prototype	3	
Hansa-Brandenburg CC	Germany	Flying boat fighter	1916	Retired	73	
Hansa-Brandenburg D.I	Austria-Hungary		1916	Retired	122	
Hansa-Brandenburg KDW	Germany	Floatplane fighter	1916	Retired	60 ca.	
Hansa-Brandenburg KF	Germany		1916	Prototype	1	
Hansa-Brandenburg L.14	Austria-Hungary		1917	Prototype	2	
Hansa-Brandenburg L.16	Austria-Hungary		1917	Prototype	1	
Hansa-Brandenburg W.11	Germany	Floatplane fighter	1917	Prototype	2	
Hansa-Brandenburg W.12	Germany	Floatplane fighter	1917	Retired	181	
Hansa-Brandenburg W.16	Germany	Floatplane fighter	1917	Prototype	3	
Hansa-Brandenburg W.17	Germany	Flying-boat fighter	1917	Prototype	2	
Hansa-Brandenburg W.18	Germany	Flying-boat fighter	1917	Retired	48	
Hansa-Brandenburg W.19	Germany	Floatplane fighter	1918	Retired	55	
Hansa-Brandenburg W.25	Germany	Floatplane fighter	1917	Prototype	1	
Hansa-Brandenburg W.27	Germany	Floatplane fighter	1918	Prototype	1	
Hansa-Brandenburg W.29/W.33	Germany	Floatplane fighter	1918	Retired	78+	
Hansa-Brandenburg W.32	Germany	Floatplane fighter	1918	Prototype	1	
Hawker Demon	UK		1931	Retired	290	
Hawker F.20/27	UK		1928	Prototype	1	
Hawker Fury	UK		1931	Retired	275	
Hawker Fury (monoplane)	UK		1944	Prototype	3	
Hawker Hart Fighter	UK		1931	Retired	6	
Hawker Hawfinch	UK		1927	Prototype	1	
Hawker Heron	UK		1925	Prototype	1	
Hawker Hoopoe	UK		1928	Prototype	1	
Hawker Hornbill	UK		1925	Prototype	1	
Hawker Hotspur	UK	Turret fighter	1938	Prototype	1	
Hawker Hunter	UK	Fighter-bomber	1951	Retired	1,972	
Hawker Hurricane & Sea Hurricane	UK	Fighter-bomber	1935	Retired	14,533	
Hawker Siddeley Kestrel FGA.1	UK	V/STOL Fighter-bomber	1964	Prototype	9	
Hawker Nimrod	UK	Carrier fighter	1931	Retired	92	
Hawker Osprey	UK	Fleet fighter/reconnaissance	1930	Retired	124	
Hawker P.1081	UK		1950	Prototype	1	
Hawker P.V.3	UK	Day & night fighter	1934	Prototype	1	
Hawker Sea Fury	UK	Carrier fighter	1945	Retired	860	
Hawker Sea Hawk	UK	Carrier jet fighter	1947	Retired	542	
Hawker Tempest	UK		1942	Retired	1,702	
Hawker Tornado	UK		1939	Prototype	4	
Hawker Typhoon	UK	Fighter-bomber	1940	Retired	3,317	
Hawker Woodcock/Danecock/Dankok	UK		1923	Retired	64	
Heinkel HD 23	Germany		1926	Prototype	4	
Heinkel HD 37	Germany		1928	Retired	134	
Heinkel HD 38	Germany		1928	Retired	12	
Heinkel HD 43	Germany		1931	Prototype	1	
Heinkel He 49	Germany		1932	Prototype	4	
Heinkel He 51	Germany		1933	Retired	700	
Heinkel He 74	Germany	Lightweight fighter	1933	Prototype	3	
Heinkel He 100/He 113	Germany		1938	Prototype	25	
Heinkel He 112	Germany		1935	Retired	104	
Heinkel He 162 Volksjäger	Germany		1944	Retired	170	
Heinkel He 219	Germany	Night fighter	1942	Retired	300	
Heinkel He 280	Germany		1940	Prototype	9	
Heinrich Pursuit	US		1917	Prototype	4	
Helwan HA-300	Egypt		1964	Prototype	3	
Henschel Hs 124	Germany	Heavy fighter	1936	Prototype	2	
HESA Azarakhsh	Iran	Strike fighter	1997	Operational	11	
HESA Saeqeh	Iran	Fighter	2004	Operational	24	
HESA Kowsar	Iran	Fighter	2018	Operational	4	
Hispano Aviación HA-1112	Spain, Germany		1951	Retired	239	
Hispano Barrón	Spain		1919	Prototype	2	
Horten Ho 229	Germany	Fighter-bomber jet flying wing	1944	Prototype	3	
Hughes D-2	US	fighter-bomber	1943	Prototype	1	
IAI Kfir	Israel	Fighter-bomber	1973	Operational	220	
IAI Lavi	Israel		1986	Prototype	3	
IAI Nammer	Israel		1991	Prototype	1	
IAI Nesher/Dagger	Israel		1971	Retired	61	
IAR-11	Romania		1930	Prototype	2	
IAR-12	Romania		1933	Prototype	1	
IAR-13	Romania		1933	Prototype	1	
IAR-14	Romania		1933	Retired	20	
IAR-15	Romania		1933	Prototype	5	
IAR-16	Romania		1934	Prototype	1	
IAR-80	Romania		1939	Retired	346	
Ikarus IK-2	Yugoslavia		1935	Retired	12	
Ikarus S-49	Yugoslavia		1949	Retired	158	
Ilyushin I-21/TsKB-32	USSR		1936	Prototype	2	
Ilyushin Il-1	USSR		1944	Prototype	1	
Ilyushin Il-2I	USSR		1939	Prototype	1	(Note: Date of first flight is for original non-fighter variant)
IMAM Ro.41	Italy		1934	Retired	753	
IMAM Ro.44	Italy	Floatplane fighter	1936	Retired	35	
IMAM Ro.51	Italy		1937	Prototype	2	
IMAM Ro.57	Italy	Interceptor/ground attack	1939	Retired	50	
IMAM Ro.58	Italy	fighter-bomber	1942	Prototype	1	
IVL C.24	Finland		1924	Prototype	1	
IVL C.VI.25	Finland		1925	Prototype	1	
IVL Haukka	Finland		1927	Prototype	5	
Junkers CL.I	Germany		1917	Retired	51	
Junkers EF 126	Germany		1947	Prototype	5	
Junkers J 2	Germany		1916	Prototype	6	
Junkers J 7	Germany		1917	Prototype	1	
Junkers J 9/D.I	Germany		1917	Retired	40	
Junkers T.22	Germany		1923	Prototype	2	
Junkers K 47	Germany		1929	Retired	23	
Junkers Ju 88	Germany	Night fighter	1936	Retired	15,000 ca.	
Junkers Ju 388	Germany	Night fighter	1943	Retired	100	
KAI KF-21 Boramae	South Korea, Indonesia		2021	Prototype	6+	
Kasyanenko KPI-5	Russia		1917	Prototype	1	
Kawanishi N1K Kyofu	Japan	Floatplane fighter	1942	Retired	97	
Kawanishi N1K-J Shiden	Japan	Interceptor	1942	Retired	1,435	
Kawanishi K-11	Japan	Carrier fighter	1927	Prototype	2	
Kawasaki KDA-3	Japan		1928	Prototype	3	
Kawasaki KDA-5 Army Type 92	Japan		1930	Retired	385	
Kawasaki Ki-5	Japan		1934	Prototype	4	
Kawasaki Ki-10	Japan		1935	Retired	588	
Kawasaki Ki-28	Japan		1936	Prototype	1	
Kawasaki Ki-45	Japan	Interceptor	1941	Retired	1,691	
Kawasaki Ki-60	Japan		1941	Prototype	3	
Kawasaki Ki-61	Japan		1941	Retired	3,159	
Kawasaki Ki-64	Japan	Interceptor	1943	Prototype	1	
Kawasaki Ki-96	Japan		1943	Prototype	3	
Kawasaki Ki-100	Japan		1945	Retired	395	
Kawasaki Ki-102 & Ki-108	Japan		1944	Retired	238	
Kochyerigin DI-6	USSR		1934	Retired	222	
Kondor D.I	Germany		1918	Prototype	1	
Kondor D.II	Germany		1918	Prototype	1	
Kondor D.VI	Germany		1918	Prototype	1	
Kondor D.VII	Germany		1917	Prototype	1	
Koolhoven F.K.55	Netherlands		1938	Prototype	1	
Koolhoven F.K.58	Netherlands		1938	Retired	18	
Kyushu J7W	Japan		1945	Prototype	2	
Laville DI-4	USSR		1932	Prototype	1	
Lavochkin-Gorbunov-Gudkov LaGG-1	USSR		1940	Retired	100	
Lavochkin-Gorbunov-Gudkov LaGG-3	USSR		1940	Retired	6,258	
Lavochkin La-5	USSR		1942	Retired	9,920	
Lavochkin La-7	USSR		1944	Retired	5,753	
Lavochkin La-9	USSR		1946	Retired	1,559	
Lavochkin La-11	USSR		1947	Retired	1,182	
Lavochkin La-15	USSR		1948	Retired	235	
Lavochkin La-126	USSR		1945	Prototype	1	
Lavochkin La-150	USSR		1946	Prototype	8	
Lavochkin La-152	USSR		1946	Prototype	1	
Lavochkin La-156	USSR		1947	Prototype	2	
Lavochkin La-160	USSR		1947	Prototype	1	
Lavochkin La-168	USSR		1948	Prototype	1	
Lavochkin La-176	USSR		1948	Prototype	1	
Lavochkin La-190	USSR		1951	Prototype	1	
Lavochkin La-200	USSR		1949	Prototype	1	
Lavochkin La-250	USSR		1956	Prototype	5	
Letov Š-3	Czechoslovakia		1922	Prototype	2	
Letov Š-4	Czechoslovakia		1922	Retired	20	
Letov Š-7	Czechoslovakia		1923	Prototype	1	
Letov Š-12	Czechoslovakia		1924	Prototype	1	
Letov Š-13	Czechoslovakia		1924	Prototype	1	
Letov Š-14	Czechoslovakia		1924	Prototype	1	
Letov Š-20	Czechoslovakia		1925	Retired	117	
Letov Š-22	Czechoslovakia		1926	Prototype	1	
Letov Š-31	Czechoslovakia		1929	Retired	32	
Letov Š-231	Czechoslovakia		1933	Retired	25	
Levasseur PL.5	France	Carrier fighter	1924	Retired	24	
Levasseur PL.6	France	Two-seat fighter	1926	Prototype	1	
Levy-Biche LB.2 & LB.6	France	Shipboard fighter	1927	Retired	26	
LFG Roland D.II	Germany		1916	Retired	300	
LFG Roland D.III	Germany		1916	Retired	20 ca.	
LFG Roland D.VI	Germany		1917	Retired	350	
Lioré et Olivier LeO 7	France	Escort fighter	1922	Retired	33	
Liuchow Kwangsi Type 3	China		1937	Prototype	1	
Lloyd 40.15	Austria-Hungary		1918	Prototype	1	
Lloyd 40.16	Austria-Hungary		1918	Prototype	1	
Lockheed YP-24	US		1931	Prototype	1	
Lockheed P-38 Lightning	US		1939	Retired	10,037	
Lockheed XP-49	US		1942	Prototype	1	
Lockheed XP-58 Chain Lightning	US		1944	Prototype	1	
Lockheed P-80 Shooting Star	US		1944	Retired	1,715	
Lockheed XF-90	US		1949	Prototype	2	
Lockheed F-94/F-97 Starfire	US		1949	Retired	855	
Lockheed F-104 Starfighter	US		1954	Retired	2,578	(Note: Includes Aeritalia F-104S and Canadiar CF-104)
Lockheed YF-12	US		1963	Prototype	3	
Lockheed Martin F-22 Raptor	US	Stealth fighter	1997	Operational	195	
Lockheed Martin F-35 Lightning II	US	Stealth multirole fighter	2006	Operational	1,170+	as of May 2025
Lockheed XFV	US	VTOL fighter	1953	Prototype	1	
Loening M-8	US		1918	Retired	55	
Loening PA-1	US		1922	Prototype	1	
Loening PW-2	US		1918	Retired	7	
Lohner 10.20 Spuckerl	Austria-Hungary		1916	Prototype	2	
Lohner Type AA	Austria-Hungary		1917	Prototype	1	
Lohner Type A/Dr.I	Austria-Hungary		1917	Prototype	1	
Loire 43	France		1932	Prototype	1	
Loire 45	France		1933	Prototype	1	
Loire 46	France		1934	Retired	61	
Loire 210	France		1935	Retired	21	
Loire 250	France		1935	Prototype	1	
Loire-Nieuport LN.160, 161 & SNCAO 161	France		1935	Prototype	3	
Loring C-1	Spain		1927	Prototype	1	
LVG E.I	Germany		1915	Prototype	1	
LVG D 10	Germany		1916	Prototype	1	
LVG D.II	Germany		1916	Prototype	1	
LVG D.III	Germany		1917	Prototype	1	
LVG D.IV	Germany		1918	Prototype	1	
LVG D.V	Germany		1918	Prototype	1	
LVG D.VI	Germany		1918	Prototype	1	
Macchi M.C.200	Italy		1937	Retired	1,153	
Macchi M.C.201	Italy		1940	Prototype	2	
Macchi M.C.202	Italy		1940	Retired	1,200	
Macchi M.C.205	Italy		1942	Retired	262	
Macchi M.5	Italy	Flying-boat fighter	1917	Retired	244	
Macchi M.6	Italy	Flying-boat fighter	1917	Prototype	1	
Macchi M.7	Italy	Flying-boat fighter	1918	Retired	110+	
Macchi M.14	Italy		1918	Retired	11	
Macchi M.26	Italy	Flying-boat fighter	1924	Prototype	2	
Macchi M.41 & M.41bis	Italy	Flying-boat fighter	1927	Retired	42	
Macchi M.71	Italy	Flying-boat fighter	1930	Retired	12 ca.	
Mann Egerton Type H	UK	Shipboard fighter	1917	Prototype	2	
Mann & Grimmer M.1 Two-seat fighter	UK		1915	Prototype	1	
Marchetti MVT/SIAI S.50	Italy		1919	Prototype	3	
Marinens Flyvebaatfabrikk M.F.9	Norway		1925	Retired	10	
Mark D.I	Germany		1918	Prototype	2	
Martin-Baker MB 2	UK		1938	Prototype	1	
Martin-Baker MB 3	UK		1942	Prototype	1	
Martin-Baker MB 5	UK		1944	Prototype	1	
Martinsyde F.1	UK		1917	Prototype	2	
Martinsyde Buzzard	UK		1918	Retired	370+	
Martinsyde G.100	UK	Fighter-bomber	1916	Retired	271	
MÁVAG Héja	Hungary		1940	Retired	204	
McDonnell XP-67	US	Interceptor	1944	Prototype	1	
McDonnell XF-85 Goblin	US	Parasite fighter	1948	Prototype	2	
McDonnell XF-88	US	Escort fighter	1948	Prototype	2	
McDonnell F-101 Voodoo	US	Fighter-bomber	1954	Retired	807	
McDonnell Douglas F-15 Eagle	US	Fighter/Interceptor	1972	Operational	1,196	
McDonnell Douglas F-15E Strike Eagle	US	Fighter-bomber	1986	Operational	418	
McDonnell Douglas F/A-18 Hornet	US	Carrier fighter-bomber	1978	Operational	1,480	
McDonnell FH Phantom	US	Carrier fighter	1945	Retired	62	
McDonnell F2H Banshee	US	Carrier fighter-bomber	1947	Retired	895	
McDonnell F3H Demon	US	Carrier interceptor	1951	Retired	519	
McDonnell Douglas F4H/F-110/F-4 Phantom II	US	Carrier fighter-bomber	1958	Operational	5,195	
Messerschmitt Bf 109	Germany		1935	Retired	33,984	
Messerschmitt Bf 110	Germany	Heavy fighter	1936	Retired	6,170	
Messerschmitt Me 163	Germany	Interceptor rocket	1941	Retired	370	
Messerschmitt Me 209 (1943)	Germany		1943	Prototype	4	
Messerschmitt Me 210	Germany	Heavy fighter	1939	Retired	90	
Messerschmitt Me 262/Avia S-92	Germany	Fighter-bomber jet	1941	Retired	1,430	
Messerschmitt Me 263	Germany	Interceptor rocket	1945	Prototype	3	
Messerschmitt Me 309	Germany		1942	Prototype	4	
Messerschmitt Me 310	Germany	Heavy fighter	1943	Prototype	1	
Messerschmitt Me 328	Germany	Parasite fighter	1944	Prototype	9	
Messerschmitt Me 410	Germany	Heavy fighter	1942	Retired	1,200 ca.	
Mikhelson/Korvin MK-1 Rybka	USSR	Floatplane fighter	1923	Prototype	1	
Mikoyan-Gurevich I-210	USSR		1941	Prototype	1	
Mikoyan-Gurevich I-211	USSR		1943	Prototype	1	
Mikoyan-Gurevich I-220	USSR		1943	Prototype	2	
Mikoyan-Gurevich I-221	USSR		1943	Prototype	1	
Mikoyan-Gurevich I-222	USSR		1944	Prototype	1	
Mikoyan-Gurevich I-224	USSR		1944	Prototype	1	
Mikoyan-Gurevich I-225	USSR		1944	Prototype	2	
Mikoyan-Gurevich I-230	USSR		1942	Prototype	7	
Mikoyan-Gurevich I-231	USSR		1943	Prototype	1	
Mikoyan-Gurevich I-250	USSR	Mixed power	1945	Prototype	12	
Mikoyan-Gurevich I-70 & 270	USSR		1946	Prototype	2	
Mikoyan-Gurevich I-320	USSR		1949	Prototype	2	
Mikoyan-Gurevich I-370/I-1/I-2	USSR		1955	Prototype	1	
Mikoyan-Gurevich I-380/I-3	USSR		1956	Prototype	2	
Mikoyan-Gurevich I-75	USSR		1958	Prototype	2	
Mikoyan-Gurevich MiG-1	USSR		1940	Retired	103	
Mikoyan-Gurevich MiG-3	USSR		1940	Retired	3,172	
Mikoyan-Gurevich MiG-5/DIS	USSR	Escort fighter	1941	Prototype	2	
Mikoyan-Gurevich MiG-7	USSR		1941	Prototype	1	
Mikoyan-Gurevich MiG-9	USSR		1946	Retired	598	
Mikoyan-Gurevich MiG-15	USSR		1947	Operational	18,000	
Mikoyan-Gurevich MiG-17	USSR		1950	Retired	10,603	
Mikoyan-Gurevich MiG-19	USSR		1953	Retired	2,172	
Mikoyan-Gurevich MiG-21	USSR	Fighter-interceptor	1955	Operational	11,496	
Mikoyan-Gurevich MiG-21PD	USSR	VTOL fighter	1966	Prototype	1	
Mikoyan-Gurevich MiG-23PD	USSR	VTOL fighter	1967	Prototype	1	
Mikoyan-Gurevich MiG-23	USSR	Fighter-bomber	1967	Operational	5,047	
Mikoyan-Gurevich MiG-25	USSR	Interceptor	1964	Retired	1,190	
Mikoyan MiG-29	USSR	Fighter	1977	Operational	1600+	(Note: includes Mikoyan MiG-29K, Mikoyan MiG-29M)
Mikoyan MiG-31	USSR	Interceptor	1975	Operational	519	
Mikoyan MiG-35	Russia	Multirole fighter	2007	Operational	10	
Mikoyan-Gurevich SM-12	USSR		1957	Prototype	3	
Mikoyan-Gurevich Ye-150 & Ye-152	USSR		1959	Prototype	4	
Mikoyan-Gurevich Ye-8	USSR		1962	Prototype	2	
Mikoyan Project 1.44	Russia		2000	Prototype	2	
Miles M.20	UK		1940	Prototype	2	
Miles M.35 Libellula	UK		1942	Prototype	1	
Miles Master Fighter	UK		1940	Retired	26	
Militär-Apparat MA-7	Switzerland		1925	Prototype	1	
Mitsubishi 1MF	Japan		1921	Retired	138	
Mitsubishi 1MF2	Japan		1928	Prototype	2	
Mitsubishi 1MF9	Japan		1927	Prototype	2	
Mitsubishi 1MF10	Japan	Carrier fighter	1933	Prototype	2	
Mitsubishi A5M	Japan		1935	Retired	1,094	
Mitsubishi A6M Zero	Japan		1939	Retired	10,939	
Mitsubishi A7M	Japan		1944	Prototype	8	
Mitsubishi F-2	Japan, US	Multirole fighter	1995	Operational	98	
Mitsubishi G6M	Japan	Heavy fighter	1940	Retired	30	
Mitsubishi J2M	Japan		1942	Retired	621	
Mitsubishi J8M/Ki-200	Japan		1945	Prototype	7	
Mitsubishi Ka-8	Japan	Carrier fighter	1934	Prototype	2	
Mitsubishi Ki-18	Japan		1935	Prototype	1	
Mitsubishi Ki-33	Japan		1936	Prototype	2	
Mitsubishi Ki-46-III KAI	Japan	Heavy fighter (conversion)	1944	Retired	200 ca.	
Mitsubishi Ki-83	Japan	Heavy fighter	1944	Prototype	4	
Mitsubishi Ki-109	Japan	Heavy day/night fighter	1942	Retired	24	
Morane-Saulnier L/Pfalz E.III	France		1914	Retired	600	(Note: The Morane-Saulnier L became first fighter when fitted with fixed machine gun)
Morane-Saulnier N	France		1915	Retired	49	
Morane-Saulnier I	France		1916	Retired	4	
Morane-Saulnier V	France		1916	Retired	30 ca.	
Morane-Saulnier AC	France		1916	Retired	32 ca.	
Morane-Saulnier AF	France		1917	Prototype	1	
Morane-Saulnier AI	France		1917	Retired	1,210	
Morane-Saulnier AN series	France		1918	Prototype	4	
Morane-Saulnier M.S.121	France		1927	Prototype	1	
Morane-Saulnier M.S.225	France		1932	Retired	75	
Morane-Saulnier M.S.325	France		1933	Prototype	1	
Morane-Saulnier M.S.405	France		1935	Prototype	18	
Morane-Saulnier M.S.406	France		1935	Retired	1,094 ca.	
Morane-Saulnier M.S.410	France		1940	Retired	74	
Mosca-Bystritsky MBbis	Russia		1916	Retired	50	
Moskalyev SAM-13	USSR		1940	Prototype	1	
Nakajima A2N	Japan		1929	Retired	100	
Nakajima A4N	Japan		1934	Retired	221	
Nakajima A6M2-N	Japan	Floatplane fighter	1941	Retired	327	
Nakajima Army Type 91 fighter	Japan		1928	Retired	450	
Nakajima C6N-1S	Japan	Night fighter	1943	Prototype	6	
Nakajima J1N	Japan	Night fighter	1941	Retired	479	
Nakajima J5N	Japan	Interceptor	1944	Prototype	6	
Nakajima Ki-8	Japan		1934	Prototype	5	
Nakajima Ki-11	Japan		1934	Prototype	4	
Nakajima Ki-12 & PE	Japan		1936	Prototype	2	
Nakajima Ki-27	Japan		1936	Retired	3,368	
Nakajima Ki-43 Hayabusa	Japan		1938	Retired	5,919	
Nakajima Ki-44 Shoki	Japan		1940	Retired	1,225	
Nakajima Ki-58	Japan	Escort fighter	1939	Prototype	3	
Nakajima Ki-84 Hayate	Japan		1943	Retired	3,514	
Nakajima Ki-87	Japan		1945	Prototype	1	
Nakajima Ki-116	Japan		1945	Prototype	1	
Nakajima Kikka	Japan		1945	Prototype	2	
Nakajima NAF-1	Japan	Carrier fighter	1933	Prototype	1	
Nakajima NAF-2	Japan	Carrier fighter	1934	Prototype	2	
Nanchang J-12	China		1970	Prototype	9	
Nanchang Q-5	China		1970	Operational	1,300	
Nielsen & Winther Type AA	Denmark		1917	Retired	6	
Nieuport 10	France		1914	Retired	300 ca.	
Nieuport 11	France		1915	Retired	900 ca.	
Nieuport 16	France		1916	Retired	300 ca.	
Nieuport 17, 21 & 23	France		1916	Retired	4,000 ca.	
Nieuport 17bis & 23bis	France		1917	Retired	101 ca.	
Nieuport 24 & 24bis	France		1917	Retired	700 ca.	
Nieuport 25 & 27	France		1917	Retired	1,000 ca.	
Nieuport 28	France		1917	Retired	300	
Nieuport-Delage NiD 29	France		1918	Retired	1,571 ca.	
Nieuport Nie 31RH	France		1919	Prototype	1	
Nieuport-Delage NiD 32RH	France	Shipboard fighter	1919	Retired	10	
Nieuport-Delage NiD 37	France	High-altitude fighter	1923	Prototype	1	
Nieuport-Delage NiD 40	France	High-altitude fighter	1923	Prototype	1	
Nieuport-Delage NiD 42	France		1924	Retired	31	
Nieuport-Delage NiD 43	France	Floatplane fighter	1924	Prototype	1	
Nieuport-Delage NiD 48, 48bis & 481	France	Lightweight Jockey fighter	1926	Prototype	2	
Nieuport-Delage NiD 52	France		1927	Retired	135	
Nieuport-Delage NiD 62	France		1928	Retired	322	
Nieuport-Delage NiD 622	France		1930	Retired	314	
Nieuport-Delage NiD 626	France		1932	Retired	12	
Nieuport-Delage NiD 628	France	High-altitude fighter	1932	Prototype	2	
Nieuport-Delage NiD 629	France		1932	Retired	50	
Nieuport-Delage NiD 72	France		1928	Retired	8	
Nieuport-Delage NiD 82	France		1930	Prototype	1	
Nieuport-Delage NiD 120 - NiD 125	France		1932	Retired	11	
Nieuport Nighthawk\Gloster Nighthawk	UK		1919	Retired	70	
Nikitin-Shevchenko IS	USSR	Polymorphic fighter	1940	Prototype	2	
North American NA-50 & P-64	US		1939	Retired	13	
North American P-51 Mustang	US		1940	Retired	16,766	
North American P-82/F-82 Twin Mustang	US		1945	Retired	270	
North American/Canadair/CAC F-86 Sabre	US		1947	Retired	9,860	
North American F-86D Sabre	US		1949	Retired	2,847	
North American FJ-1 Fury	US		1946	Retired	31	
North American FJ-2/-3 Fury	US		1951	Retired	741	
North American FJ-4 Fury	US		1954	Retired	374	
North American YF-93	US		1950	Prototype	2	
North American F-100 Super Sabre	US		1953	Retired	2,294	
North American F-107	US		1956	Prototype	3	
Northrop XFT	US		1933	Prototype	1	
Northrop XP-56 Black Bullet	US		1943	Prototype	2	
Northrop P-61 Black Widow	US		1942	Retired	742	
Northrop XP-79	US		1945	Prototype	1	
Northrop F-89 Scorpion	US		1948	Retired	1,050	
Northrop F-5	US		1959	Operational	2,246	
Northrop YF-17	US		1974	Prototype	2	
Northrop F-20 Tigershark	US		1982	Prototype	3	
Northrop YF-23	US		1990	Prototype	2	
NVI F.K.31	Netherlands		1923	Retired	17	
Oeffag D.III	Austria-Hungary		1917	Retired	526 ca.	
Orenco B	US		1918	Prototype	4	
Orenco D	US		1919	Retired	54	
Packard-Le Peré LUSAC-11 & LUSAC-21	US		1918	Retired	30	
Panavia Tornado	Germany, Italy, UK	Multirole	1974	Operational	990	
Parnall Pipit	UK		1928	Prototype	2	
Parnall Plover	UK		1922	Retired	13	
Parnall Puffin	UK	Amphibious fighter	1920	Prototype	3	
Parnall Scout	UK	Zeppelin interceptor	1916	Prototype	1	
Pashinin I-21	USSR		1940	Prototype	3	
Pemberton-Billing P.B.9	UK		1914	Prototype	1	
Pemberton-Billing Nighthawk	UK	Zeppelin interceptor	1917	Prototype	1	
Petlyakov Pe-3	USSR	Night fighter	1941	Retired	360	
Petlyakov VI-100	USSR	High-altitude fighter	1939	Prototype	1	
Pfalz D.III	Germany		1917	Retired	1,010	
Pfalz D.IV	Germany		1916	Prototype	1	
Pfalz D.VI	Germany		1917	Prototype	2+	
Pfalz D.VII	Germany		1917	Retired	15+	
Pfalz D.VIII	Germany		1918	Retired	40	
Pfalz D.XII	Germany		1918	Retired	800	
Pfalz D.XIII	Germany		1918	Prototype	1+	
Pfalz D.XIV	Germany		1918	Prototype	3+	
Pfalz D.XV	Germany		1918	Prototype	2+	
Pfalz Dr.I	Germany		1917	Retired	10	
Pfalz Dr.II	Germany		1918	Prototype	2	
Pfalz E.I	France, Germany		1915	Retired	45	
Pfalz E.II	France, Germany		1915	Retired	130	
Pfalz E.IV	France, Germany		1916	Retired	46	
Pfalz E.V	France, Germany		1916	Retired	20	
Phönix 20.14	Austria-Hungary		1917	Retired	158	
Phönix 20.15	Austria-Hungary		1917	Retired	158	
Phönix 20.16	Austria-Hungary	Two-seat fighter	1917	Prototype	1	
Phönix 20.22	Austria-Hungary		1917	Prototype	1	
Phönix 20.23	Austria-Hungary		1917	Prototype	1	
Phönix 20.24	Austria-Hungary		1917	Prototype	1	
Phönix 20.25	Austria-Hungary		1917	Prototype	1	
Phönix D.I	Austria-Hungary		1917	Retired	158	
Phönix D.II	Austria-Hungary		1917	Retired	158	
Phönix D.III	Austria-Hungary		1917	Retired	158	
Piaggio P.2	Italy		1923	Prototype	2	
Piaggio P.119	Italy		1942	Prototype	1	
Polikarpov DI-1	USSR	Two-seat fighter	1926	Prototype	1	
Polikarpov I-1	USSR		1923	Prototype	18	
Polikarpov I-3	USSR		1928	Retired	389	
Polikarpov I-5	USSR		1930	Retired	803	
Polikarpov I-6	USSR		1930	Prototype	2	
Polikarpov I-15	USSR		1933	Retired	671	
Polikarpov I-15bis	USSR		1937	Retired	2,408	
Polikarpov I-152	USSR		1938	Prototype	3	
Polikarpov I-153	USSR		1938	Retired	3,437	
Polikarpov I-16	USSR		1933	Retired	8,644	
Polikarpov I-17	USSR		1934	Prototype	3	
Polikarpov I-180	USSR		1938	Prototype	13	
Polikarpov I-185	USSR		1941	Prototype	4	
Polikarpov I-190	USSR		1939	Prototype	2	
Polikarpov ITP	USSR		1942	Prototype	2	
Polikarpov TIS	USSR	Heavy fighter	1941	Prototype	2	
Pomilio FVL-8	Italy		1919	Prototype	6	
Pomilio Gamma	Italy		1918	Prototype	2	
Pomilio PD	Italy		1917	Retired	431	
Ponnier M-1	France		1915	Retired	20	
Port Victoria P.V.1	UK	Floatplane fighter	1916	Prototype	1	
Port Victoria P.V.2 & P.V.2bis	UK	Floatplane fighter	1916	Prototype	1	
Port Victoria P.V.5 & P.V.5A	UK	Floatplane fighter	1917	Prototype	2	
Port Victoria P.V.7	UK	Lightweight fighter	1917	Prototype	1	
Port Victoria P.V.8	UK	Lightweight fighter	1917	Prototype	1	
Port Victoria P.V.9	UK	Floatplane fighter	1917	Prototype	1	
Potez XI	France		1922	Prototype	1	
Potez 23	France		1924	Prototype	1	
Potez 26	France		1924	Prototype	1	
Potez 31	France	Night fighter	1929	Prototype	1	
Potez 630	France		1936	Retired	1,360	
Prajadhipok	Siam		1929	Prototype	1	
Praga E-44	Czechoslovakia		1932	Prototype	2	
Praga E-45	Czechoslovakia		1934	Prototype	1	
PWS-1 & 1bis	Poland	Two-seat fighter	1927	Prototype	1	
PWS-10	Poland		1930	Retired	80	
PZL P.1	Poland		1929	Prototype	2	
PZL P.6	Poland		1930	Prototype	1	
PZL P.7	Poland		1930	Retired	151	
PZL P.8	Poland		1931	Prototype	2	
PZL P.11	Poland		1931	Retired	325	
PZL P.24	Poland		1933	Retired	192 ca.	
PZL.38 Wilk	Poland	Heavy fighter	1938	Prototype	2	
PZL.50 Jastrząb	Poland		1939	Prototype	1	
Qaher-313	Iran	Stealth fighter	2017	In Development	1	Developed into a UAV
Reggiane Re.2000	Italy		1939	Retired	180	
Reggiane Re.2001	Italy		1940	Retired	252	
Reggiane Re.2002	Italy		1940	Retired	225	
Reggiane Re.2004	Italy		1942	Prototype	1	
Reggiane Re.2005	Italy		1942	Retired	48	
Renard Epervier	Belgium		1928	Prototype	2	
Renard R.36, R.37 & R.38	Belgium		1937	Prototype	3	
R.E.P. C.1	France		1918	Prototype	1	
Republic P-43 Lancer	US		1940	Retired	272	
Republic P-47 Thunderbolt	US		1941	Retired	15,686	
Republic XP-72	US		1944	Prototype	2	
Republic F-84 Thunderjet	US		1946	Retired	7,524	
Republic XF-96/F-84F Thunderstreak	US		1950	Retired	3,428	
Republic XF-91 Thunderceptor	US		1949	Prototype	2	
Republic F-105 Thunderchief	US		1955	Retired	833	
Rex D (1917)	Germany		1917	Prototype	1	
Rikugun Ki-93	Japan	Heavy fighter	1945	Prototype	2	
Rockwell XFV-12	US		1977	Prototype	1	(Note: Unsuccessful tethered trials in 1978)
Rogožarski IK-3	Yugoslavia		1938	Retired	12	
Romano R-110	France	Heavy fighter	1938	Prototype	1	
Roussel R.30	France		1939	Prototype	1	
Royal Aircraft Factory B.E.2	UK	Night fighter	1915	Retired	3,500	
Royal Aircraft Factory B.E.12	UK	Zeppelin interceptor	1915	Retired	601	
Royal Aircraft Factory F.E.2	UK		1914	Retired	1,939	
Royal Aircraft Factory F.E.8	UK		1915	Retired	295	
Royal Aircraft Factory N.E.1 night fighter	UK		1917	Prototype	6	
Royal Aircraft Factory S.E.2	UK		1913	Prototype	1	
Royal Aircraft Factory S.E.4	UK		1914	Prototype	1	
Royal Aircraft Factory S.E.4a	UK		1915	Prototype	4	
Royal Aircraft Factory S.E.5 & 5a	UK		1916	Retired	5,205	
Rumpler 6B	Germany	Floatplane fighter	1916	Retired	88	
Rumpler D.I	Germany		1917	Prototype	6+	
Ryan FR Fireball	US	Carrier mixed-propulsion fighter	1944	Retired	66	
Ryan XF2R Dark Shark	US	Carrier mixed-propulsion fighter	1946	Prototype	1	
Saab 21	Sweden	Fighter-bomber	1943	Retired	298	
Saab 21R	Sweden	Fighter-bomber jet	1947	Retired	64	
Saab 29 Tunnan	Sweden	Fighter	1948	Retired	661	
Saab J32B Lansen	Sweden	Fighter	1952	Retired	450	
Saab 35 Draken	Sweden	Fighter-interceptor	1955	Retired	644	
Saab 37 Viggen	Sweden	Multirole fighter	1967	Retired	329	
Saab JAS 39 Gripen	Sweden	Multirole fighter	1988	Operational	271+	
Salmson-Béchereau SB-5	France		1925	Prototype	1	
Saunders A.10	UK		1929	Prototype	3	
Saunders-Roe SR.A/1	UK	Flying-boat jet fighter	1947	Prototype	3	
Saunders-Roe SR.53	UK	Interceptor with mixed propulsion	1957	Prototype	2	
Savoia-Marchetti SM.88	Italy	Heavy fighter	1939	Prototype	1	
Savoia-Marchetti SM.91	Italy	Fighter-bomber	1943	Prototype	2	
Savoia-Marchetti SM.92	Italy	Fighter-bomber	1943	Prototype	1	
Schütte-Lanz D.I	Germany		1915	Prototype	1	
Schütte-Lanz D.II	Germany		1915	Prototype	1	
Schütte-Lanz D.III	Germany		1918	Prototype	1	
Schütte-Lanz D.IV	Germany		1918	Prototype	1	
SEA IV	France		1918	Retired	117	
SET XV	Romania		1934	Prototype	1	
Seversky AP-9	US		1939	Prototype	1	
Seversky P-35	US		1935	Retired	136	
Seversky XP-41	US		1939	Prototype	1	
Shchetinin (Grigorovich) M-11 & M-12	Russia	Flying-boat fighter	1916	Retired	61	
Shenyang J-5	China		1956	Retired	1,952	
Shenyang J-6	China		1958	Operational	5,202	
Shenyang J-8 & J-8II	China		1969	Operational	390	
Shenyang J-11	China	Air superiority fighter	1998	Operational	440	
Shenyang J-15	China	Carrier multirole fighter	2009	Operational	50	
Shenyang J-16	China	Multirole strike fighter	2011	Operational	245+	
Shenyang J-35	China	Planned Carrier fighter	2012	Prototype	2+	
Shenyang J-50	China	Stealth fighter	2024	Prototype	1	
Short Gurnard	UK	Shipboard fighter	1929	Prototype	2	
SIAI S.52	Italy		1924	Retired	2	
SIAI S.58	Italy	Flying-boat fighter	1924	Retired	5	
SIAI S.67	Italy	Flying-boat fighter	1930	Retired	3	
Siemens-Schuckert D.I	Germany		1916	Retired	95	
Siemens-Schuckert D.II	Germany		1917	Prototype	3	
Siemens-Schuckert D.III	Germany		1917	Retired	80	
Siemens-Schuckert D.IV	Germany		1918	Retired	123	
Siemens-Schuckert D.V	Germany		1918	Prototype	1	
Siemens-Schuckert D.VI	Germany		1918	Prototype	2	
Siemens-Schuckert DDr.I	Germany	Twin-engine fighter	1917	Prototype	1	
Siemens-Schuckert E.I, E.II & E.III	Germany		1915	Retired	28	
Sikorsky S-16	Russia		1915	Retired	30 ca.	
Sikorsky S-18	Russia	Escort fighter	1917	Prototype	1	
Sikorsky S-20	Russia		1916	Retired	5	
SNCAC (Centre) NC.1080	France	Carrier fighter	1949	Prototype	1	
SNCAN (Nord) N.2200	France	Carrier fighter	1949	Prototype	1	
SNCAO (Ouest) CAO.200	France		1939	Prototype	1	
SNCASO (Sud Aviation) Vautour II	France	Interceptor	1952	Retired	71	
SNCASE Baroudeur	France	Lightweight fighter	1953	Prototype	2	
SNCASE (Sud-Est) Aquilon	UK, France	Carrier fighter	1951	Retired	101	
SNCASE (Sud-Est) SE.100	France	Heavy fighter	1939	Prototype	1	
SNCASE (Sud-Est) Durandal	France	Interceptor	1956	Prototype	2	
SNCASO (Sud-Ouest) Espadon	France	Interceptor	1948	Prototype	1	
SNCASO (Sud-Ouest) Trident	France	Interceptor	1953	Prototype	12	
Sopwith Baby	UK	Floatplane fighter	1915	Retired	286	
Sopwith Bulldog	UK	Two-seat fighter	1918	Prototype	2	
Sopwith Buffalo	UK	Fighter-reconnaissance	1918	Prototype	2	
Sopwith Camel	UK		1916	Retired	5,490	
Sopwith Dolphin	UK		1917	Retired	2,072	
Sopwith Dragon	UK		1918	Prototype	200 ca.	
Sopwith Gunbus	UK		1914	Retired	23	
Sopwith 3F.2 Hippo	UK	Two-seat fighter	1917	Prototype	2	
Sopwith Hispano-Suiza Triplane	UK		1916	Prototype	2	
Sopwith 1½ Strutter	UK	Two-seat fighter	1915	Retired	5,939	
Sopwith L.R.T.Tr.	UK	Escort fighter	1916	Prototype	1	
Sopwith Pup	UK		1916	Retired	1,770	
Sopwith Schneider	UK		1914	Retired	136 ca.	
Sopwith Snail	UK		1918	Prototype	2	
Sopwith Snapper	UK		1919	Prototype	3	
Sopwith Snark	UK		1919	Prototype	3	
Sopwith Snipe	UK		1917	Retired	2,097	
Sopwith Swallow	UK		1918	Prototype	1	
Sopwith Triplane	UK		1916	Retired	147	
SPAD S.A-1, 2, 3, 4 & SG	France	Two-seat fighter	1915	Retired	99	
SPAD S.VII	France		1916	Retired	6,000+	
SPAD S.XI Cn2	France	Night fighter	1917	Prototype	1	
SPAD S.XII	France	Cannon fighter	1917	Retired	20	(Note: as many as 300 SPAD 12 airframes built but not completed)
SPAD S.XIII	France		1917	Retired	8,472	
SPAD S.XIV	France	Floatplane fighter	1917	Retired	40	
SPAD S.XV	France		1917	Prototype	5	
SPAD S.XVII	France		1918	Retired	20	
SPAD S.XX	France		1918	Retired	100	
SPAD S.XXI	France		1918	Prototype	2	
SPAD S.XXII	France		1919	Prototype	1	
SPAD S.XXIV	France	Shipboard fighter	1918	Prototype	1	
Spijker/Spijker-Trompenburg V.3	Netherlands		1918	Prototype	1	
Standard E-1	US		1917	Retired	168	
Sturtevant B	US	Speed scout/pursuit	1916	Prototype	1	
Sukhoi Su-1 & Su-3	USSR	High-altitude fighter	1940	Prototype	2	
Sukhoi Su-5	USSR	Mixed power	1945	Prototype	1	
Sukhoi Su-7 (1944)	USSR		1944	Prototype	1	
Sukhoi Su-9 (1946)	USSR		1946	Prototype	1	
Sukhoi Su-11 (1947)	USSR		1947	Prototype	1	
Sukhoi Su-15 (1949)	USSR	Interceptor	1949	Prototype	1	
Sukhoi Su-7	USSR	fighter-bomber	1955	Retired	1,847	
Sukhoi Su-9	USSR	Interceptor	1957	Retired	1,100	
Sukhoi Su-11	USSR	Interceptor	1958	Retired	108	
Sukhoi Su-15	USSR	Interceptor	1962	Retired	1,290	
Sukhoi Su-17, 20 & 22	USSR	Fighter-bomber	1966	Operational	2,867	
Sukhoi Su-27	USSR	Multirole fighter	1977	Operational	680	
Sukhoi Su-30	Russia	Multirole fighter	1989	Operational	630+	
Sukhoi Su-32/Su-34	Russia	Strike fighter	1990	Operational	15	
Sukhoi Su-33	Russia	Carrier multirole fighter	1987	Operational	24	
Sukhoi Su-27M/Su-35	Russia		1988	Operational	18	
Sukhoi Su-37	Russia	Technology demonstrator	1996	Prototype	2	
Sukhoi Su-47	Russia	Experimental fighter	1997	Prototype	1	
Sukhoi Su-57	Russia	Stealth multirole fighter	2010	Operational	21	
Sukhoi Su-30MKI	India, Russia	Multirole air superiority fighter	2000	Operational	272	
Sukhoi T-3	USSR	Interceptor	1956	Prototype	3	
Sukhoi P-1	USSR	Interceptor	1957	Prototype	1	
Supermarine 224 F.7/30	UK		1934	Prototype	1	
Supermarine 508	UK		1951	Prototype	2	
Supermarine 510	UK		1948	Prototype	1	
Supermarine 525	UK		1954	Prototype	1	
Supermarine 528	UK		1950	Prototype	1	
Supermarine 529	UK		1952	Prototype	1	
Supermarine 535	UK		1950	Prototype	1	
Supermarine Attacker	UK	Carrier jet fighter	1946	Retired	185	
Supermarine Scimitar	UK	Carrier strike fighter	1956	Retired	76	
Supermarine Seafang	UK	Carrier fighter	1946	Prototype	18	
Supermarine Seafire	UK	Carrier fighter	1941	Retired	2,334	
Supermarine Sea King	UK	Flying-boat fighter	1920	Prototype	2	
Supermarine Spitfire	UK		1936	Retired	20,351	
Supermarine Spiteful	UK		1944	Prototype	19	
Supermarine Swift	UK		1948	Retired	197	
Svenska Aero Jaktfalken I & II	Sweden		1929	Retired	19	
Tachikawa Ki-106	Japan		1945	Prototype	3	
TAI Hürjet	Turkey	Light combat	2017	Prototype	2	
TAI TF Kaan	Turkey	Stealth multirole fighter	2024	Prototype	3	
Tairov Ta-1	USSR	Escort fighter	1939	Prototype	2	
Tairov Ta-3	USSR	Escort fighter	1939	Prototype	4	
Tebaldi-Zari	Italy		1919	Prototype	1	
Tereshchenko No 7	Russia		1916	Prototype	1	
Thomas-Morse MB-1	US		1918	Prototype	2	
Thomas-Morse MB-2	US		1918	Prototype	2	
Thomas-Morse MB-3	US		1919	Retired	260	
Thomas-Morse MB-9	US		1922	Prototype	1	
Thomas-Morse XP-13	US		1929	Prototype	1	
Thomas Morse TM-23	US		1924	Prototype	1	
Thulin K	Sweden		1917	Retired	19	
TNCA Series C Microplano	Mexico		1918	Prototype	1	
TNCA Series E Tololoche	Mexico		1924	Retired	4	
Tokorozawa Koshiki-2	Japan		1922	Prototype	2	
Tomasevic I-110	USSR	Heavy fighter	1942	Prototype	1	
Tupolev ANT-5/I-4	USSR		1927	Retired	369	
Tupolev ANT-13/I-8	USSR		1930	Prototype	1	
Tupolev ANT-21	USSR		1933	Prototype	2	
Tupolev ANT-23/I-12	USSR		1931	Prototype	1	
Tupolev ANT-29	USSR	Cannon fighter	1935	Prototype	1	
Tupolev ANT-31/I-14	USSR		1933	Retired	20	
Tupolev ANT-46/DI-8	USSR	Heavy cannon fighter	1935	Prototype	1	
Tupolev Tu-1	USSR	Night fighter	1947	Prototype	1	
Tupolev Tu-28/Tu-128	USSR	Interceptor	1961	Retired	188	
VEF I-16	Latvia		1940	Prototype	10	
VFW VAK 191B	West Germany	VTOL fighter	1971	Prototype	3	
VL Humu	Finland		1944	Prototype	1	
VL Mörkö-Morane	Finland		1943	Retired	41	
VL Myrsky	Finland		1941	Retired	51	
VL Pyörremyrsky	Finland		1945	Prototype	1	
Vickers E.F.B.1	UK		1913	Prototype	1	
Vickers E.F.B.2	UK		1913	Prototype	1	
Vickers E.F.B.3	UK		1913	Prototype	1	
Vickers F.B.5	UK		1914	Retired	224	
Vickers E.F.B.7	UK	Twin-engine fighter	1915	Prototype	1	
Vickers E.F.B.8	UK	Twin-engine fighter	1915	Prototype	1	
Vickers F.B.9	UK		1915	Retired	119	
Vickers F.B.11	UK	Escort fighter	1916	Prototype	1	
Vickers F.B.12	UK		1916	Retired	20	
Vickers F.B.16	UK		1916	Prototype	3	
Vickers F.B.19	UK		1916	Retired	62	
Vickers F.B.24	UK	Two-seat fighter	1917	Prototype	3	
Vickers F.B.25	UK	Night fighter	1917	Prototype	1	
Vickers E.S.1	UK		1915	Prototype	3	
Vickers Jockey	UK		1930	Prototype	1	
Vickers Type 123 & 141	UK		1926	Prototype	1	
Vickers Type 143 Bolivian Scout	UK		1929	Retired	6	
Vickers Type 161	UK	Interceptor	1931	Prototype	1	
Vickers Type 177	UK	Carrier fighter	1929	Prototype	1	
Vickers Type 432	UK	High altitude interceptor	1942	Prototype	1	
Vickers Vampire	UK		1917	Prototype	4	
Vickers Venom	UK		1936	Prototype	1	
Vickers Vireo	UK		1928	Prototype	1	
Villiers II	France	Carrier fighter	1925	Retired	32	
Villiers V	France	Night fighter	1926	Prototype	1	
Villiers VIII	France	Carrier fighter	1926	Prototype	1	
Villiers XXIV	France	Night fighter	1926	Prototype	1	
Vought VE-7S & VE-7SF	US	Shipboard fighter	1917	Retired	12	
Vought VE-8	US		1918	Prototype	2	
Vought VE-9	US		1922	Retired	41	
Vought V-80	US		1933	Retired	5	
Vought V-141/V-143	US		1936	Prototype	1	
Vought FU	US		1926	Retired	20	
Vought XF2U	US	Two-seat fighter	1929	Prototype	1	
Vought XF3U	US	Two-seat fighter	1933	Prototype	1	
Vought F4U/FG/F3A Corsair	US	fighter-bomber	1940	Retired	12,571	
Vought XF5U	US		1947	Prototype	2	(Note: Hopped off ground during taxi run, did not achieve sustained flight.)
Vought F6U Pirate	US	Carrier fighter	1946	Prototype	33	
Vought F7U Cutlass	US	Carrier fighter	1948	Retired	320	
Vought F8U/F-8 Crusader	US	Carrier fighter	1955	Retired	1,261	
Vought XF8U-3 Crusader III	US		1958	Prototype	5	
Vultee XP-54	US		1943	Prototype	2	
Vultee P-66 Vanguard	US		1939	Retired	146	
Waco CSO-A/240A	US		1927	Retired	11	
Waco CTO-A	US		1927	Prototype	1	
Weiss Manfréd WM-23 Ezüst Nyíl	Hungary		1941	Prototype	1	
Westland C.O.W. Gun Fighter	UK	Cannon fighter	1930	Prototype	1	
Westland F.7/30	UK	Day & night fighter	1934	Prototype	1	
Westland Interceptor	UK	Interceptor	1929	Prototype	1	
Westland N.1B	UK	Floatplane fighter	1917	Prototype	2	
Westland Wagtail	UK		1918	Prototype	5	
Westland Weasel	UK	Fighter-reconnaissance	1918	Prototype	4	
Westland Welkin	UK	High-altitude interceptor	1942	Retired	75	
Westland Westbury	UK	Heavy fighter	1926	Prototype	2	
Westland Whirlwind	UK	Heavy fighter	1938	Retired	116	
Westland Wizard	UK		1927	Prototype	1	
Westland Wyvern	UK	Torpedo/strike fighter	1946	Retired	127	
Weymann W-1	France		1915	Prototype	1	
Wibault 1	France		1918	Prototype	1	
Wibault 3	France		1923	Prototype	1	
Wibault 7 & Vickers Wibault	France		1924	Retired	168	
Wibault 8 Simoun	France		1926	Prototype	1	
Wibault 9	France		1926	Prototype	1	
Wibault 12, 121 & 122 Sirocco	France		1926	Prototype	3	
Wibault 130 Trombe & 170 Tornade	France	Lightweight fighter	1928	Prototype	3	
Wibault 210	France		1929	Prototype	1	
Wibault 313	France		1932	Prototype	1	
Wight Baby	UK	Floatplane fighter	1916	Prototype	3	
Wight Quadruplane	UK		1916	Prototype	1	
WKF D.I	Austria-Hungary		1918	Prototype	2	
WKF Dr.I	Austria-Hungary		1918	Prototype	1	
Wright XF3W	US		1926	Prototype	1	
Xian JH-7	China	Fighter-bomber	1988	Operational	192	
Yakovlev I-29	USSR		1939	Prototype	1	
Yakovlev Yak-1	USSR		1940	Retired	8,700	
Yakovlev I-30/Yak-3	USSR		1941	Retired	4,848	
Yakovlev Yak-7	USSR		1940	Retired	6,399	
Yakovlev Yak-9	USSR		1942	Retired	16,769	
Yakovlev Yak-15	USSR		1946	Retired	280	
Yakovlev Yak-17	USSR		1947	Retired	430	
Yakovlev Yak-19	USSR		1947	Prototype	2	
Yakovlev Yak-23	USSR		1947	Retired	310	
Yakovlev Yak-25 (1947)	USSR		1947	Prototype	1	
Yakovlev Yak-25	USSR	Interceptor	1952	Retired	638	
Yakovlev Yak-27V/K	USSR	Interceptor	1956	Prototype	3+	
Yakovlev Yak-28P	USSR	Interceptor	1960	Retired	435	
Yakovlev Yak-30 (1948)	USSR		1948	Prototype	2	
Yakovlev Yak-36	USSR	VTOL fighter	1963	Prototype	12	
Yakovlev Yak-38	USSR	Carrier VTOL fighter	1971	Retired	231	
Yakovlev Yak-41/141	USSR		1987	Prototype	2	
Yakovlev Yak-50 (1949)	USSR		1949	Prototype	3	
Yatsenko I-28	USSR		1939	Prototype	7	
Yokosuka D4Y2-S	Japan	Night fighter	1940	Retired	16+	
Yokosuka P1Y2 Kyokko	Japan	Night fighter	1943	Retired	96	
Zeppelin-Lindau (Dornier) D.I	Germany		1918	Prototype	7	(Note: Additional 50 Dornier D.I aircraft ~50% complete when production halted due to armistice)

== See also ==
- List of bomber aircraft
- List of attack aircraft

== Bibliography ==
- Bruce, J.M. (1995). "de Bruyère C.1 of 1917". Windsock International. 11 (5). Albatros Publications.
- Davilla, James J.; Soltan, Arthur M. (1997). French Aircraft of the First World War. Stratford CT: Flying Machines Press. ISBN 0-9637110-4-0.
- Grosz, Peter M. (1998). Dornier D.I. Windsock Mini Datafile. Vol. 12. Hertfordshire: Albatros Productions Ltd. ISBN 0-948414-92-8.
- Kowalski, Tomasz J. (2003). Nieuport 1-27. Lublin: Kagero. ISBN 83-89088-09-6.
- Mikesh, Robert C.; Abe, Shorzoe (1990). Japanese Aircraft 1910-1941. London: Putnam Aeronautical Books. ISBN 1-55750-563-2.
