= Norman Thompson N.1B =

Prototype British flying boat fighter aircraft

N.1B
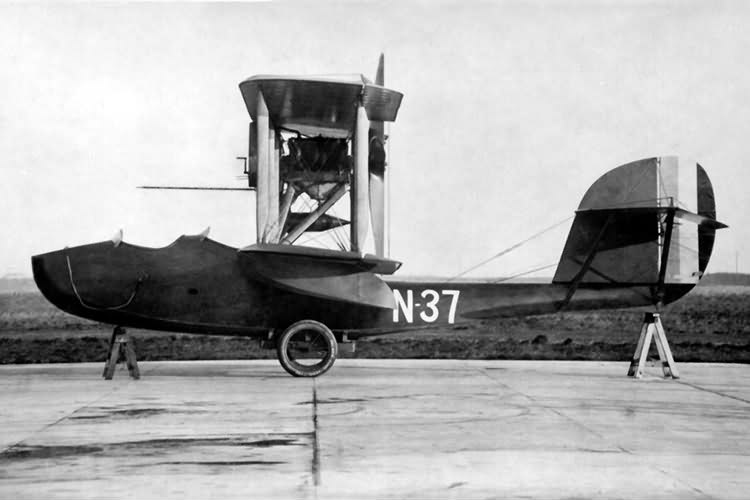
- N37, Isle of Grain Test Depot.

General information
- Type: Flying boat fighter
- National origin: United Kingdom
- Manufacturer: Norman Thompson Flight Company
- Designer: Francis Percy Beadle
- Status: Prototype
- Number built: 1

History
- First flight: October 1917

The Norman Thompson N.1B was a prototype British flying boat fighter aircraft of the First World War. A two-seat single-engined pusher biplane, a single example was built in 1917, but no production followed.

== Development and design ==
In 1917, the British Admiralty issued Specification N.1B, for single-engined, single-seat aircraft which laid down a number of requirements of aircraft to equip the Royal Naval Air Service (RNAS), including a requirement for a single-engined floatplane or flying boat fighter aircraft intended to operate from the Royal Navy's seaplane carriers. The specification required a maximum speed of 110 miles per hour (96 kn; 180 km/h) at 10,000 ft (3,000 m), and a ceiling of 20,000 ft (6,100 m). Responses were received from a number of companies, including the Supermarine Baby and the Westland N.1B, as well as that from the Norman Thompson Flight Company.

The Norman Thompson design, the Norman Thompson N.1B was a pusher biplane, with two-bay equal-span wings that folded forwards for storage on board ship, with ailerons on both upper and lower wings. A single Hispano-Suiza engine mounted between the wings drove a four-blade propeller. While the specification required a single-seat aircraft, the Norman Thompson aircraft had a crew of two, seated in separate tandem cockpits ahead of the wings, giving rise to its alternative name of TNT (Tandem Norman Thompson).

Construction of a single prototype, N37 was ordered by the Admiralty in April 1917, first flying in October that year. Norman Thompson claimed that the aircraft had good performance, reaching a speed of 108 mph (174 km/h), but when the aircraft was officially tested at the Port Victoria Marine Experimental Aircraft Depot, performance was much less than that claimed by Norman Thompson, and did not meet the requirements of the specification. No production of any of the aircraft designed against Specification N.1B followed, with the RNAS operating Sopwith Pup and Camel landplanes from flying-off platforms aboard ships, which did not require the carrier to heave to in order to lower a seaplane to the water. The Norman Thompson N.1B was struck off charge by October 1918.

== Specifications ==
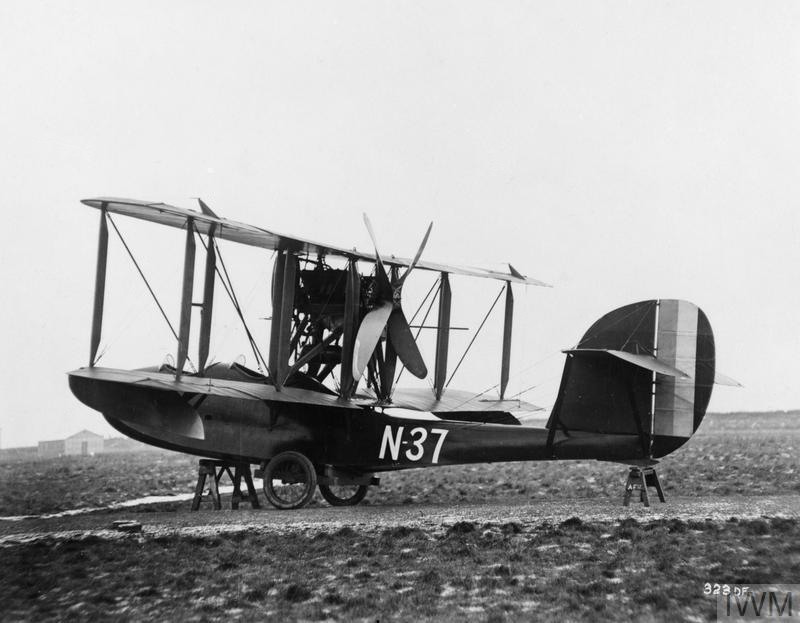
Rear left view, Isle of Grain Test Depot, 28 December 1917.

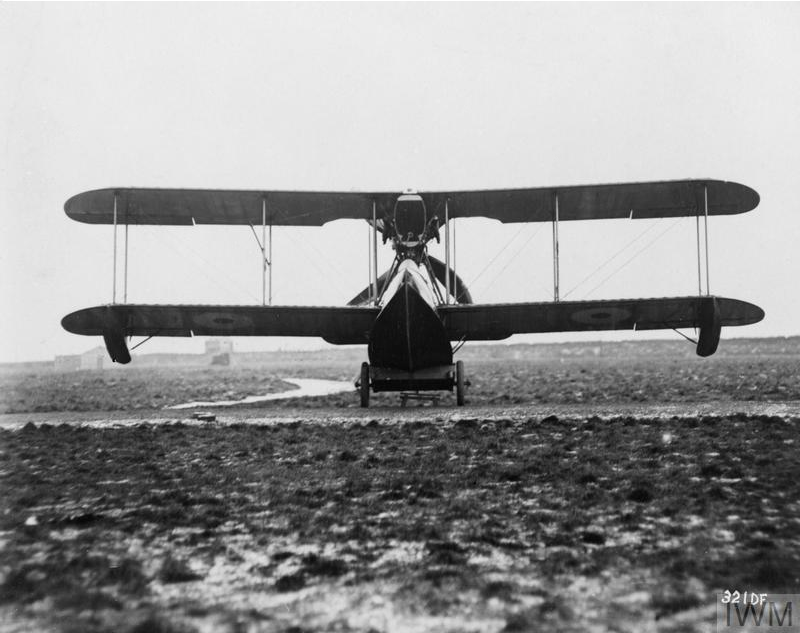
Front view, Isle of Grain Test Depot, 28 December 1917.

Data from British Aeroplanes 1914-18

General characteristics

- Crew: 2
- Length: 26 ft 3 in (8.00 m)
- Wingspan: 34 ft 3 in (10.44 m)
- Width: 13 ft 2 in (4.01 m) (wings folded)
- Height: 9 ft 7 in (2.92 m)
- Wing area: 357 sq ft (33.2 m^{2})
- Empty weight: 1,895 lb (860 kg)
- Gross weight: 2,673 lb (1,212 kg)
- Powerplant: 1 × Hispano-Suiza 8 water-cooled V-8 engine, 200 hp (150 kW)
- Propellers: 4-bladed

Performance

- Maximum speed: 93 mph (150 km/h, 81 kn) at 2,000 ft (610 m)
- Endurance: 3 1/2 hours at 6,000 ft (1,800 m)
- Service ceiling: 12,600 ft (3,800 m)
- Time to altitude:
  - 3 min 30 s to 2,000 ft (610 m)
  - 27 min 35 s to 10,000 ft (3,050 m)

Armament

- Guns: 1× .303 in Lewis gun

== See also ==
Aircraft of comparable role, configuration, and era

- Curtiss Model K
- Blackburn N.1B
- Supermarine Baby
- Westland N.1B

Related lists

- List of flying boats and floatplanes
