= Port Victoria P.V.5 =

British single-engined floatplane fighter aircraft

P.V.5 & P.V.5A

General information
- Type: Floatplane Fighter
- National origin: United Kingdom
- Manufacturer: Port Victoria Marine Experimental Aircraft Depot
- Number built: 2

History
- First flight: July 1917
- Developed from: Port Victoria P.V.2

The Port Victoria P.V.5 was a British single-engined floatplane fighter aircraft of the First World War. A single example was built and flown at the Royal Naval Air Service's Port Victoria Marine Experimental Aircraft Depot on the Isle of Grain in 1917. Despite demonstrating good manoeuvrability and handling, no production followed, with the Royal Naval Air Service instead using landplanes for the fighter role.

== Design and development ==
In 1916, the Air Department of the British Admiralty issued a requirement for a single-seater fighter floatplane. The specification demanded a speed of 85 kn (157 km/h; 98 mph) at 6,500 ft (2,000 m), an endurance of four hours and an armament of a single machine gun and two 65 lb (30 kg) bombs. The use of a 150 hp (110 kW) Smith Static radial engine as powerplant was requested.

The Port Victoria Marine Experimental Aircraft Depot prepared two designs to meet the requirement. One, the Port Victoria P.V.5, was a development of its earlier P.V.2 sesquiplane, while the P.V.5A differed in having a more conventional biplane wing.

Both the P.V.5 and P.V.5A were nearing completion in late 1916, but the absence of their intended engines delayed testing. The Smith Static was an experimental ten-cylinder single-row radial engine developed by the American John W. Smith, which had attracted the attention of the Admiralty because of its light weight and promised low fuel and oil consumption, but proved to be a failure, with only a few engines ever completed. When it was realised at Grain that the Smith Static (which was to be used by the P.V.4 and P.V.5A as well as the P.V.5) would not be forthcoming, a 150 hp Hispano-Suiza 8 V8 engine was obtained, and it was decided to modify the P.V.5 to use it. Soon after, in January, overall control for the supply of aircraft was transferred to the Ministry of Munitions, who subjected the operations of Port Victoria to scrutiny, and while work continued on the P.V.5, the P.V.5A was suspended. Work eventually restarted on the P.V.5A, and it flew in 1918 fitted with a 200 hp Hispano-Suiza, although no production followed.

The P.V.5's wing bracing struts also carried the aircraft's floats, forming a "W" shape when viewed from the front, with no bracing wires used, while a high-lift wing section, developed by the National Physical Laboratory and used on the Port Victoria P.V.1 and P.V.2 was again employed. Armament was the specified single synchronised Vickers machine gun, with two 65 lb bombs carried internally. The Hispano-Suiza engine was enclosed in an annular cowling and drove a two-bladed propeller. Flat-bottomed pontoon-type floats were fitted, which were angled outwards to divert spray away from the engine and propeller.

The P.V.5, serial number N53, flew in July 1917, but capsized when it alighted at the end of its first flight when a float failed. The aircraft was manoeuvrable and pleasant to fly, with a good view from the cockpit, but performance failed to meet specifications, this being blamed by Port Victoria on the aircraft's propeller being poorly matched to the aircraft, and the Hispano-Suiza engine being heavier than the Smith Static that the aircraft was designed for. No production followed, with the fighter requirements of the Royal Naval Air Service already being met by landplanes such as the Sopwith Pup and Camel

== Specifications (P.V.5) ==
Data from British Aeroplanes 1914–18

General characteristics

- Crew: 1
- Length: 25 ft 6 in (7.77 m)
- Upper wingspan: 32 ft (9.8 m)
- Lower wingspan: 21 ft (6.4 m)
- Height: 9 ft 9 in (2.97 m)
- Wing area: 245 sq ft (22.8 m^{2})
- Empty weight: 1,788 lb (811 kg)
- Gross weight: 2,456 lb (1,114 kg)
- Fuel capacity: 36 imp gal (160 L; 43 US gal)
- Powerplant: 1 × Hispano-Suiza 8 water-cooled V8 engine, 150 hp (110 kW)

Performance

- Maximum speed: 94.5 mph (152.1 km/h, 82.1 kn)
- Service ceiling: 9,900 ft (3,000 m)
- Time to altitude:
  - 4 min 50 s to 2,000 ft (610 m)
  - 20 min 15 s to 6,500 ft (2,000 m)

Armament

- Guns: 1× 0.303 in Vickers machine gun
- Bombs: 2× 65 lb (30 kg) bombs
