= W16 =

W16 may refer to:

- Mercedes W16, a Formula 1 car competing in the 2025 Formula One World Championship
- British NVC community W16, a woodland community in the British National Vegetation Classification system
- Hansa-Brandenburg W.16, a floatplane fighter aircraft
- London Buses route W16
- Truncated icosidodecahedron
- W16 engine, an engine with sixteen cylinders
