= Westland N.1B =

Prototype British single-engined floatplane fighter aircraft

N.1B

General information
- Type: Fighter
- National origin: United Kingdom
- Manufacturer: Westland Aircraft
- Status: Prototype
- Number built: 2

History
- First flight: August 1917

The Westland N.1B was a prototype British single-engined floatplane fighter aircraft of the First World War. The first aircraft to be designed by Westland Aircraft, it was a single-engined tractor biplane. Despite good performance, only two aircraft were built, the Royal Naval Air Service operating landplane fighters from ships instead.

== Development and design ==
In 1916, the British Admiralty drew up Requirement N.1B for a single-seat floatplane or flying boat fighter aircraft to operate from the Royal Navy's seaplane carriers, demanding a speed of 110 mph (177 km/h) and a ceiling of 20,000 ft (6,100 m). Three companies submitted designs in response, Blackburn and Supermarine with flying boats (the Blackburn N.1B and Supermarine Baby), while Westland proposed a floatplane, the Westland N.1B. Westland received an order for two aircraft.

Westland's design, which was the first original design built by Westland, was a single-engined tractor biplane of wooden construction. It had a deep fuselage, while its two-bay wings were designed to fold to save space on ship, and were fitted with trailing-edge flaps. It was powered by a single Bentley A.R.1 rotary engine (later known as the BR1) and carried a single synchronised forward-firing Vickers machine gun on the nose, and a Lewis gun firing over the upper wing. The first N.1B was fitted with 11 ft (3.35 m) long Sopwith main floats and a 5 ft (1.52 m) long tail float, while the second N.1B had much longer (17 ft 6 in 5.34 m) main floats, which removed the need for a tail float.

The first N.1B, serial number N16 was first flown by Harry Hawker from Westland's Yeovil factory in August 1917. The two N.1Bs were evaluated at the Port Victoria Marine Experimental Aircraft Depot in October 1917, demonstrating good performance and handling. By this time, however, the Royal Naval Air Service was operating Sopwith Pup landplanes from flying-off platforms aboard ships, which did not require the carrier to heave-to in order to lower a seaplane to the water, and was planning to carry out similar operations with the Sopwith Camel, and the N.1B programme was cancelled.

== Specifications (Second prototype) ==
Data from Westland Aircraft since 1915

General characteristics

- Crew: 1
- Length: 26 ft 5 1/2 in (8.065 m)
- Wingspan: 31 ft 3 1/2 in (9.538 m)
- Height: 11 ft 2 in (3.40 m)
- Wing area: 278 sq ft (25.8 m^{2})
- Empty weight: 1,513 lb (686 kg)
- Gross weight: 1,987 lb (901 kg)
- Powerplant: 1 × Bentley BR.1 9-cylinder air-cooled rotary piston engine, 150 hp (110 kW)
- Propellers: 2-bladed fixed-pitch propeller

Performance

- Maximum speed: 107 mph (172 km/h, 93 kn)
- Endurance: 2 hours 45 minutes
- Service ceiling: 10,400 ft (3,200 m)
- Time to altitude: 5,000 ft (1,500 m) in 10 minutes

Armament

- Guns: 1x forward firing, synchronised .303 in Vickers machine guns and one Lewis gun above upper wing
- Bombs: 2x 65 lb (30 kg) bombs on racks under fuselage

== See also ==
Aircraft of comparable role, configuration, and era

- Blackburn N.1B
- Port Victoria P.V.9
- Short N.1B Shirl
- Supermarine N.1B Baby
