= Port Victoria P.V.9 =

British single-seat biplane floatplane fighter

P.V.9

General information
- Type: Floatplane fighter
- National origin: United Kingdom
- Manufacturer: RNAS Marine Experimental Aircraft Depot
- Number built: 1

History
- First flight: December 1917

The Port Victoria P.V.9 was a British single-seat biplane floatplane fighter of the First World War. Although claimed to be the best aircraft of its type yet to be tested, only a single prototype was built.

== Design and development ==
In mid-1917, the RNAS Marine Experimental Aircraft Depot at Port Victoria on the Isle of Grain was instructed to build a new single-seat floatplane fighter as a possible replacement for the Royal Naval Air Service (RNAS)'s Sopwith Babies. The new aircraft was to combine the good manoeuvrability and pilot view of Port Victoria's earlier P.V.2 floatplane with superior speed.

Like the P.V.2, the new design, the Port Victoria P.V.9 was a single-engined sesquiplane (i.e. a biplane with its lower wing much smaller than its upper wing) braced with faired steel tubes. The fuselage, wider than that of the P.V.2, was mounted between the upper and lower wings, almost filling the inter-wing gap, giving an excellent view for the pilot. Armament was a Vickers machine gun synchronised to fire through the propeller disc, with a Lewis gun mounted above the upper wing firing over the propeller. Power was provided by a Bentley BR1 rotary engine. While the designers had hoped to use the same high-lift aerofoil section as used in the P.V.2, this was rejected by the Admiralty, who demanded the use of the more conventional RAF 15 aerofoil, which resulted in a larger aircraft with a reduced climb rate and ceiling.

== Operational history ==
The P.V.9 made its maiden flight in December 1917, but trials were delayed by engine troubles and by a collision of the aircraft with a barge, which resulted in a propeller not being matched properly to the aircraft being fitted, further reducing performance. Despite this, when the P.V.9 was officially tested in May 1918, the P.V.9 was said to be the best seaplane fighter tested up to that time. No production followed, however, as the availability of Sopwith Pup and Camel landplanes which could operate from platforms aboard ships, removed the requirement for a floatplane fighter.

== Specifications ==
Data from British Aeroplanes 1914–18

General characteristics

- Crew: 1
- Length: 25 ft 2 in (7.67 m)
- Upper wingspan: 30 ft 11 in (9.42 m)
- Lower wingspan: 20 ft 1 in (6.12 m)
- Height: 9 ft 0 in (2.74 m)
- Wing area: 227 sq ft (21.1 m^{2})
- Airfoil: RAF 15
- Empty weight: 1,404 lb (637 kg)
- Gross weight: 1,965 lb (891 kg)
- Fuel capacity: 34.5 Imp Gallons
- Powerplant: 1 × Bentley BR1 9-cylinder air-cooled rotary engine, 150 hp (110 kW)

Performance

- Maximum speed: 110.5 mph (177.8 km/h, 96.0 kn) at 2,000 ft (610 m)
- Endurance: 2.5 hours
- Service ceiling: 11,500 ft (3,500 m)
- Time to altitude: 3 min 10 s to 2,000 ft (610 m), 27 min 20 s to 10,000 ft (3,050 m0

Armament

- Guns: 1× .303 in Vickers machine gun and 1× Lewis gun above upper wing

== See also ==
Related development

- Port Victoria P.V.2

Aircraft of comparable role, configuration, and era

- Westland N.1B
- Supermarine Baby
