= Port Victoria P.V.2 =

British prototype floatplane fighter

P.V.2

General information
- Type: Floatplane Fighter
- National origin: United Kingdom
- Manufacturer: Port Victoria Marine Experimental Aircraft Depot
- Status: Prototype only
- Number built: 1

History
- First flight: 16 June 1916

The Port Victoria P.V.2 was a British prototype floatplane fighter of the First World War, designed and built at the Royal Naval Air Service's Port Victoria Marine Experimental Aircraft Depot on the Isle of Grain. Only a single aircraft was built, with the type not being chosen for production.

== Design and development ==
The Port Victoria Depot's second design, designated Port Victoria P.V.2 was a floatplane fighter intended to intercept German Zeppelins. The P.V.2 was a small single engined biplane, powered by a Gnome Monosoupape rotary engine driving a four blade propeller. It was of wood and fabric construction, and of sesquiplane configuration, i.e. with its lower wing much smaller than its upper wing (both of which used the high-lift wing sections pioneered by the P.V.1). Unusually, the aircraft's wing bracing struts also carried the aircraft's floats, forming a "W" shape when viewed from the front. The upper wing was attached directly to the top of the fuselage, giving a good field of fire for the intended armament of a single 2-lb Davis gun recoilless gun.

The P.V.2 first flew on 16 June 1916, and demonstrated good performance and handling. The upper wing, however, while giving excellent upwards view to the pilot, gave a poor downwards view of the pilot, particularly during landing, while the Davis gun had lost favour with the Admiralty as an anti-Zeppelin weapon. The P.V.2 was therefore rebuilt as the P.V.2bis with a revised, longer span upper wing mounted 12 inches (0.30 m) above the fuselage and the Davis gun replaced by two Lewis guns mounted above the wing, firing over the propeller. The modified aircraft first flew in this form in early 1917.

While the P.V.2bis again showed excellent handling, the RNAS's requirement for a floatplane anti-Zeppelin fighter had lapsed, and no production was ordered.

== Specifications (P.V.2bis) ==
Data from The British Fighter since 1912

General characteristics

- Crew: 1
- Length: 22 ft 0 in (6.71 m)
- Wingspan: 29 ft 0 in (8.84 m)
- Height: 9 ft 4 in (2.84 m)
- Wing area: 180 sq ft (17 m^{2})
- Empty weight: 1,211 lb (549 kg)
- Gross weight: 1,702 lb (772 kg)
- Powerplant: × Gnome Monosoupape 9 Type B-2 9-cylinder air-cooled rotary piston engine, 100 hp (75 kW)
- Propellers: 2-bladed fixed-pitch propeller

Performance

- Maximum speed: 93 mph (150 km/h, 81 kn)
- Service ceiling: 10,000 ft (3,000 m)
- Time to altitude: 3,000 ft (914 m) in 6 minutes

Armament

- Guns: 2x .303 in (7.70 mm) Lewis guns above upper wing.

== See also ==
Related development

- Port Victoria P.V.9
