= Port Victoria P.V.4 =

Prototype two-seat reconnaissance floatplane

P.V.4

General information
- Type: Floatplane
- National origin: United Kingdom
- Manufacturer: Port Victoria Marine Experimental Aircraft Depot
- Number built: 1

History
- First flight: 1917

The Port Victoria P.V.4 was a prototype two-seat reconnaissance floatplane of the First World War. The P.V.4 was a small single engined pusher biplane. It was unsuccessful as the engine it was designed around was a failure and alternatives were unsuitable, only one aircraft being built.

== Design and development ==
In early 1916, the Port Victoria Marine Experimental Aircraft Depot designed a two-seat pusher configuration landplane fighter aircraft, (possibly designated the P.V.3). Although this was not built, Port Victoria was ordered to build a floatplane derivative for reconnaissance operations, being required to carry a Lewis gun and radio and to have an endurance of eight hours. The resultant aircraft, the Port Victoria P.V.4, had sesquiplane wings and a small streamlined nacelle for the two crew, which was attached to the upper wing. It was to be powered by a 150 hp (112 kW) Smith Static radial engine, an experimental engine which, while light, promised excellent fuel economy.

While the airframe of the prototype was completed during the autumn of 1916, the promised engine never appeared. When this became apparent, it became clear that possible alternatives such as the Hispano-Suiza 8 or Rolls-Royce Falcon could not be installed in the P.V.4, and eventually a 110 hp (82 kW) Clerget rotary engine was fitted, allowing the P.V.4 to undergo testing in June 1917. The Clerget was longer than the Smith Static, however, which meant that the aircraft could not be rigged to be stable both at full power and with power off, with longitudinal control being lost at below 63 mph (101 km/h). As pusher aircraft were now considered obsolete, no further development took place.

== Specifications ==
Data from British Aeroplanes 1914–18

General characteristics

- Capacity: 2
- Wingspan: 32 ft (9.8 m)
- Wing area: 220 sq ft (20 m^{2})
- Gross weight: 2,400 lb (1,089 kg)
- Powerplant: 1 × Clerget 9Z nine-cylinder rotary engine, 110 hp (82 kW)

Performance

- Maximum speed: 81 mph (130 km/h, 70 kn)

Armament

- Guns: 1× .303 in Lewis gun
