= Port Victoria Marine Experimental Aircraft Depot =

RAF airbase in Kent, England

The British Royal Naval Air Service established an R.N. Aeroplane Repair Depot on the Isle of Grain on the River Medway Estuary in Kent in early 1915. As there was already a RNAS seaplane base on the Isle of Grain, the Depot was named Port Victoria, after the nearby railway station. It became the Marine Aircraft Experimental Depot, comprising 3 sections:

- Experimental Construction Depot
- Seaplane Test Depot
- Experimental Armament Section

It was renamed Marine and Armament Experimental Establishment on 16 March 1920 in recognition of the fact that weapons and other equipment were evaluated as well as complete aircraft. It was renamed again on 1 March 1924 to the Marine Aircraft Experimental Establishment and eventually moved to Felixstowe.

While at Port Victoria it designed a range of experimental aircraft, not all of which were constructed and flown.

== Port Victoria aircraft types ==
- P.V.1
- P.V.2
- P.V.3 - Design only, not produced
- P.V.4
- P.V.5
- P.V.5A
- P.V.7
- P.V.8
- P.V.9
- Grain Griffin
