= Hansa-Brandenburg W.16 =

WWI German floatplane

W.16
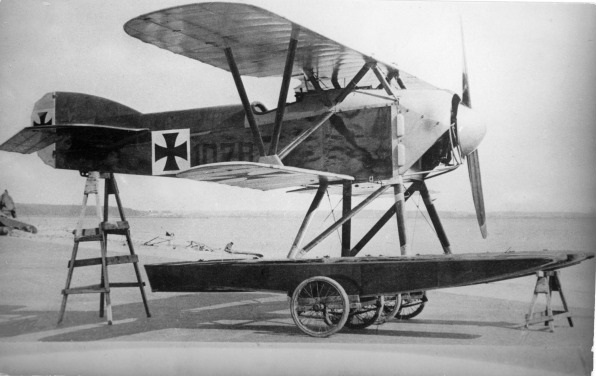

General information
- Type: Fighter
- National origin: Germany
- Manufacturer: Hansa-Brandenburg
- Primary user: Imperial German Navy
- Number built: 3

History
- First flight: February 1917

The Hansa-Brandenburg W.16 was a single-seat floatplane fighter designed by the Hansa-Brandenburg Aircraft Company (Hansa Brandenburgische Flugzeugwerke) for the Imperial German Navy's (Kaiserliche Marine) Naval Air Service (Marine-Fliegerabteilung) during World War I. Three prototypes were ordered in 1916, but its performance did not justify a production order.

== Design and development ==
Intended as a replacement for the KDW floatplane fighter for defense of the Naval Air Service's naval bases, the W.16 shared that aircraft's general single-bay biplane wing configuration. The aircraft was also intended to test the viability of rotary engines for seaplanes and was thus fitted with a air-cooled, 14-cylinder, 160-metric-horsepower (118 kW) Oberursel U.III rotary that drove a two-bladed, fixed-pitch propeller. The W.16 was constructed from fabric-covered wood and its fuselage and floats were skinned with plywood. The KDW's star-shaped interplane struts was replaced with V-shaped struts on each side that connected the upper and lower wings and another strut that ran from the upper longeron of the fuselage to the lower wing replaced the KDW's bracing cables. The armament consisted of a pair of fixed, forward-firing 7.92-millimeter (0.312 in) LMG 08/15 machine guns.

Three prototypes were ordered in November 1916 and the first one was delivered to the Seaplane Experimental Command (Seeflugzeug-Versuchs-Kommando) in February 1917. One prototype was supposedly cancelled in November 1917, but all three are listed in a report on 15 May from Warnemünde. The W.16 was not selected for production because its performance was not an improvement over the KDW and the Naval Air Service was abandoning the short-range defense mission for its fighters. Two aircraft survived the war and were located at Hage when the Allies inspected the German seaplane bases in December 1918. Their ultimate fate is unknown, but they were likely scrapped.

== Specifications (W.16) ==
Data from Hansa-Brandenburg Aircraft of WWI: Volume 2–Biplane Seaplanes

General characteristics

- Crew: 1
- Length: 7.35 m (24 ft 1 in)
- Upper wingspan: 9.25 m (30 ft 4 in)
- Lower wingspan: 7.8 m (25 ft 7 in)
- Height: 2.93 m (9 ft 7 in)
- Wing area: 21.35 m^{2} (229.8 sq ft)
- Empty weight: 636 kg (1,402 lb)
- Gross weight: 896 kg (1,975 lb)
- Powerplant: 1 × Oberursel U.III air-cooled, two-row 14-cylinder rotary piston engine, 120 kW (160 hp)
- Propellers: 2-bladed wooden, fixed-pitch

Performance

- Maximum speed: 170 km/h (110 mph, 92 kn)
- Endurance: ±2 hours
- Time to altitude: 5 minutes to 1,000 m (3,300 ft)
- 8.2 minutes to 1,500 m (4,900 ft)
- 12.6 minutes to 2,000 m (6,600 ft)
- 27 minutes to 3,000 m (9,800 ft)

Armament

- Guns: 2 × fixed, forward-firing 7.92 mm (0.312 in) LMG 08/15 Spandau machine guns

== Bibliography ==
- Andersson, Lennart & Sanger, Ray (2014). Retribution and Recovery: German Aircraft and Aviation 1919 to 1922. Air-Britain (Historians). ISBN 978-0-85130-467-0.
- Gray, Peter & Thetford, Owen (1987) [1970]. German Aircraft of the First World War (2nd ed.). Putnam. ISBN 0-85177-809-7.
- Green, William & Swanborough, Gordon (2001) [1994]. The Complete Book of Fighters: An Illustrated Encyclopedia of Every Fighter Built and Flown (Revised and Updated ed.). Salamander Books. ISBN 1-84065-269-1.
- Owers, Colin A. (2015). Hansa-Brandenburg Aircraft of WWI: Volume 2–Biplane Seaplanes. Great War Aviation Centennial Series. Vol. 18. Aeronaut Books. ISBN 978-1-935881-32-2.
