= Blackburn Pellet =

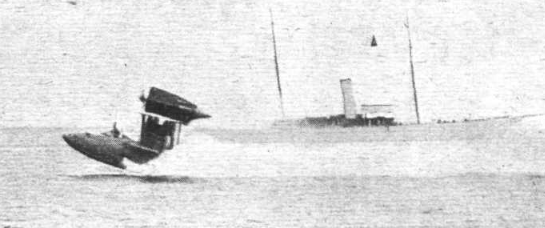
- On takeoff run a few seconds before loss

General information
- Type: Racing flying-boat
- National origin: United Kingdom
- Manufacturer: Blackburn Aeroplane and Motor Co. Ltd
- Number built: 1

History
- First flight: 26 September 1923

The Blackburn Pellet was a single-engined, single-seater biplane flying boat designed as a contender for the 1923 Schneider Trophy competition. It was destroyed while taking off for the trials of the contest.

== Development ==
The 1923 Schneider Trophy competition was held in Great Britain and Blackburn decided to submit a contestant. A flying boat (the Supermarine Sea Lion III) had won the contest the year before, and in addition, Blackburn had the elegant hull of the unfinished N.1B fleet escort bomber in store since 1918. A small flying boat therefore seemed the right approach. Only the hull and possibly the wingtip floats of the N.1B were used in the Pellet; the rest of the aircraft was new.

The hull was a two-step design using the Linton Hope construction method. This used a system of circular formers separated by stringers and covered with a double layer of 0.125 in (3.2 mm) mahogany strips, the second at right angles to the first. This allowed the construction of smooth curved surfaces. The Pellet was a single-bay biplane without stagger and the lower wing was of slightly smaller span and chord. The lower wing was mounted on the top of the fuselage and carried wingtip floats mounted directly below the N-type interplane struts. There was another pair of these struts between the fuselage and upper wing supporting the engine, which was mounted tractorwise above the upper wing surface in a streamlined nacelle. The engine, a 450 hp (340 kW) Napier Lion was cooled with radiators fitted flush in the lower surface of the upper wing. The pilot sat in front of the propeller. At the rear of the aircraft, the braced tailplane was mounted about halfway up the single fin.

== Operational history ==
The intention was to have the Pellet flying a month before the race, but the aircraft sank at its first launch on 23 July 1923. It next flew on 26 September 1923, a day before the race. Inevitably, this flight revealed some problems, chiefly of trim and cooling, and that night a new radiator and propeller were fitted. It set off in the morning to the trials, but on the takeoff run, baulked by a small boat, the aircraft began porpoising and was wrecked the pilot, R.W.Kenworthy escaping unhurt.

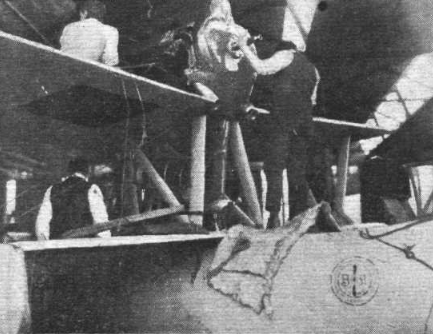
The Pellet having a new Lamblin radiator fitted on the day of its accident

== Specifications ==
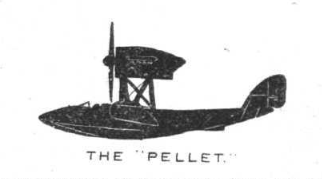
Side silhouette of Blackburn Pellet

Data from Jackson 1968, p. 173

General characteristics

- Crew: one
- Length: 28 ft 7 in (8.71 m)
- Wingspan: 34 ft 0 in (11.59 m)
- Height: 10 ft 8 in (3.25 m)
- Wing area: 314 sq ft (29.2 m^{2})
- Empty weight: 2,105 lb (957 kg)
- Gross weight: 2,800 lb (1,270 kg)
- Powerplant: 1 × W-12 watercooled Napier Lion , 450 hp (335 kW)

Performance

- Maximum speed: 160 mph (259 km/h, 140 kn) (estimated)

== See also ==
- Schneider Trophy

Related lists

- List of seaplanes and flying boats
