= Port Victoria P.V.1 =

P.V.1

General information
- Type: Floatplane Fighter
- National origin: United Kingdom
- Manufacturer: RNAS Marine Experimental Aircraft Depot, Port Victoria
- Status: Prototype only
- Primary user: Royal Naval Air Service
- Number built: 1

History
- First flight: 1916
- Developed from: Sopwith Baby

The Port Victoria P.V.1 was a British prototype floatplane fighter of the First World War, built at the Royal Naval Air Service's Port Victoria Marine Experimental Aircraft Depot on the Isle of Grain by fitting a Sopwith Baby with high-lift wings. Only a single aircraft was built, with the type not being chosen for production.

== Design and development ==
Squadron-Commander J.W.Seddon RN, officer commanding of the Marine Experimental Aircraft Depot, realised that high-lift wings, as described by the National Physical Laboratory in 1916, had the potential to improve the lifting capacity of the Sopwith Baby seaplane. He instructed the Depot's Experimental Construction Depot to make and fit such wings to a Sopwith Baby, the resulting aircraft being named the P.V.1.

The new wings had the same area as the thinner aerofoils used on the Baby but were mounted with greater stagger; larger floats were also fitted. The thicker wings, heavier floats and additional 300 lb. (136 kg) ballast added a total of 600 lb. (272 kg) to the weight of the Baby, but the P.V.1 was still able to reach a height of 8,000 ft. (2,438 m) and achieve a speed of 67 kt (77 mph, 124 km/h).

While it successfully demonstrated the performance of the new high-lift wings, the Fairey Hamble Baby was placed in production instead.

The P.V.1 was retained by the Depot for test operation, including the investigation of the catapult launching of aircraft.

== Specifications (P.V.1) ==
Data from Flight 29 November 1957

General characteristics

- Crew: 1
- Length: 23 ft 0 in (7.01 m)
- Wing area: 240 sq ft (22 m^{2})
- Empty weight: 1,811 lb (821 kg)
- Gross weight: 2,302 lb (1,044 kg)
- Powerplant: 1 × Clerget 9Z 9-cylinder air-cooled rotary piston engine, 110 hp (82 kW)
- Propellers: 2-bladed fixed-pitch wooden propeller

Performance

- Maximum speed: 77 mph (124 km/h, 67 kn)
- Service ceiling: 8,000 ft (2,400 m)

== See also ==
Related development

- Sopwith Baby

Aircraft of comparable role, configuration, and era

- Fairey Hamble Baby

Related lists

- List of flying boats and floatplanes
