= 1915 in aviation =

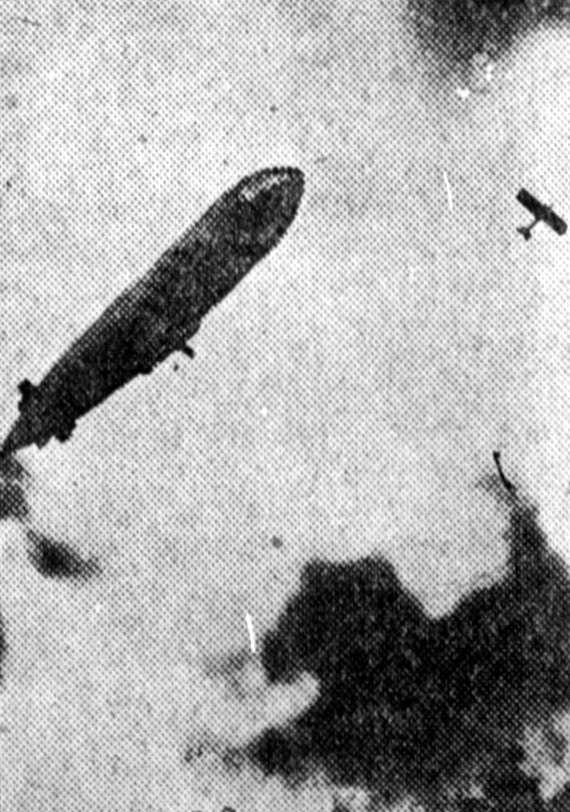
A German airship and a French aeroplane battle in the sky, 1915.

This is a list of aviation-related events from 1915:

== Events ==
- The United States Navy establishes a lighter-than-air arm, charged with the operation of airships and of kite balloons to be towed behind warships. By the end of World War I, four of its battleships and six of its destroyers will have operated balloons.
- The United States Army forms one company of the 2d Aero Squadron for service in the Philippine Islands.

=== January ===
- January 6 or 15 – The German submarine U-12 departs Zeebrugge with a Friedrichshafen FF.29 seaplane lashed to her deck in an attempt to use submarines to carry seaplanes within range of England. The seaplane is forced to take off early, reconnoiters the coast of Kent, and has to fly all the way back to Zeebrugge when bad weather makes returning to U-12 impossible. It is the only German attempt to operate an aircraft from a submarine.
- January 7 – Italy establishes the Corpo Aeronautica Militare ("Military Aviation Corps") as part of the Italian Royal Army.
- January 19–20 (overnight) – The first Zeppelin raid on the United Kingdom takes place, carried out by the Imperial German Navy dirigibles L-3, L-4, and L-6. L-6 turns back with engine trouble, but L-3 drops six 50-kg (110-lb) high-explosive and seven incendiary bombs on Great Yarmouth and L-4 bombs Sheringham, Snettisham, and King's Lynn. The raid kills four people and injures 16.
- January 24 – An airship plays a role in a naval battle for the first time, when the German Navy Zeppelin L 5, flying a routine patrol, arrives over the ongoing Battle of the Dogger Bank between British and German battlecruisers in the North Sea. Operating cautiously after taking fire from British light cruisers, L-5 finds it difficult to track the action through cloud cover and plays a minimal role in the engagement, passing limited information to the commanding German admiral, Franz von Hipper, in the late stages of the battle.
- January 25 – The Imperial German Navy suffers its first wartime loss of an airship when PL 19 is forced down on the Baltic Sea by icing and engine failure while attempting to return to base after bombing Libau, Russia. Two Imperial Russian Navy minesweepers capture her seven-man crew and set her ablaze, destroying her. No further airship operations will take place in the Baltic theater until mid-July.

=== February ===
- February 2 – The only Imperial Russian Navy seaplane carrier to see service in the Baltic Sea during World War I, Orlitza, is commissioned.
- February 15 – Russian Sikorsky Ilya Muromets bombers attack the Vistula-Dobrzhani area of Poland, the first bombing raid by the Ilya Muromets.
- February 17 – Only four weeks after they became the first two airships to bomb the United Kingdom, the Imperial German Navy Zeppelins L-3 and L-4 are wrecked in Denmark while attempting to search for British ships off Norway. L-3's crew burns her before being interned by Danish authorities. L-4 is blown out over the North Sea after touching down in Denmark and disappears with four men still on board; the Danes intern the rest of her crew.
- February 26 – The second German attempt to bomb the United Kingdom fails when strong headwinds force the German Navy Zeppelin L-8, sent out to attack alone, to give up her attempt and land at an Imperial German Army camp in German-occupied Belgium.

=== March ===
- The Imperial Russian Navy's Black Sea Fleet begins seaplane carrier raids against the Bosporus and the Ottoman Empire's European Black Sea coast. The raids, which continue until May, are history's first in which battleships play a subsidiary role while operating with aviation ships, foreshadowing the aircraft carrier-battleship task forces of World War II.
- March 3 – In the United States, an Act of Congress creates the National Advisory Committee on Aeronautics (NACA), a United States Government agency charged with undertaking, promoting, and institutionalizing aeronautical research. NACA will operate until October 1, 1958, when the National Aeronautics and Space Administration (NASA) will replace it.
- March 4 – The third German attempt to bomb the United Kingdom fails when the naval Zeppelin L-8, sent to attack alone, encounters a gale over the North Sea and is blown out of control over Nieuwpoort, Belgium, where Belgian antiaircraft gunners shoot her down.
- March 7 – The first British tactical bombing raids are made in support of ground troops in Menin and Courtai.
- March 11 – The Royal Navy charters the cargo ship SS Manica for conversion into the first British balloon ship, HMS Manica. The Royal Navy will be the only navy during World War I to operate balloon ships, specialized ships designed to handle observation balloons as their sole function.
- March 14 – Pioneering American pilot Lincoln J. Beachey dies when his Beachey-Eaton Monoplane suffers a structural failure while he is flying inverted before a crowd of 250,000 at the Panama–Pacific International Exposition and crashes into San Francisco Bay.
- March 17 – The Imperial German Army attempts its first airship raid against the United Kingdom with the Zeppelin Z XII. Unable to find targets through cloud cover, Z XII drops no bombs, but over Calais, France, on the way home makes the first use of a manned observation car lowered by winch below the Zeppelin to allow observation while the airship remains safely above cloud cover. The German Navy later also experiments with such cars and later makes them standard equipment aboard German naval airships.
- March 18 – Imperial Russian Air Service Stabskapitän Alexander Kazakov uses a grapnel to hook his aircraft to a German Albatros two-seater aircraft in mid-air, hoping to destroy the Albatros by detonating a small bomb fixed to the grapnel. When his grapnel mechanism jams as he unreels it, he instead downs the Albatros by ramming it with his undercarriage.
- March 24 – Five Royal Naval Air Service Avro 504s of No. 1 Squadron bomb the German submarine depot at Hoboken in Antwerp, Belgium, starting a fire in the shipyard that destroys two German submarines.

=== April ===
- April 1
  - In a Morane-Saulnier L, future French ace Jean Navarre and his observer/gunner, Sub-Lieutenant Jean Robert, attack a German Aviatik B.I over Merval, France. Robert uses a carbine to damage it and wound its pilot, forcing it to land behind French lines and surrender. It is Navarre's first victory.
  - Later in the day, French pilot Lieutenant Roland Garros scores the first kill achieved by firing a machine gun through a tractor propeller when he shoots down a German Albatros observation plane. With no synchronization gear yet available for his machine gun, he uses metal deflector wedges installed on the propeller of his Morane Saulnier L fighter to keep the machine gun from shooting his own propeller blades off. It is also his first kill. He will score two more victories this way, on April 15 and April 18.
- April 3 – French pilot Adolphe Pégoud scores his fifth aerial victory, becoming history's first ace.
- April 14–15 (overnight) – Germany bombs the United Kingdom for the second time when the German Navy Zeppelin L 9 bombs the Tyneside area of England, either killing or injuring a woman and a small boy.
- April 15–16 (overnight) – The German Navy Zeppelins L 5, L 6, and L 7 – the latter carrying Peter Strasser, the commander of the German Naval Airship Division, as an observer – bomb England. Although they meet little resistance other than rifle fire, their bombs inflict little damage.
- April 16 – The United States Navy conducts the first catapult launch of an aircraft from a floating platform, launching an airplane from Navy Coal Barge No. 214 at Naval Air Station Pensacola at Pensacola, Florida.
- April 18
  - German forces shoot down and capture Roland Garros.
  - Flying a B.E.2c, Royal Flying Corps pilot Lanoe Hawker attacks the German Zeppelin sheds at Gontrode, Belgium, destroying a brand-new shed and shooting down a nearby Drachen observation balloon. He will be awarded the Distinguished Service Order for the action. The Germans soon cease to use Gontrode as an airship base.
- April 19 – During the Gallipoli campaign, the Royal Navy balloon ship Manica lofts her observation balloon operationally for the first time in the first operational use of a balloon ship during World War I. The observer in her balloon directs fire against Ottoman positions for the armored cruiser Bacchante. Manica's work during the campaign impresses the British Admiralty enough for it to order additional balloon ships
- April 20 – Flying a reconnaissance mission along the border with Mexico in a Martin T biplane, First Lieutenant Byron Q. Jones (pilot) and Lieutenant Thomas D. Milling (observer) become the first United States Army aviators to come under enemy fire during a flight when Mexican forces open fire on them with small arms and at least one machine gun while they are over the Rio Grande at Brownsville, Texas. Their plane is hit, but they are uninjured. It is considered the first combat air sortie in U.S. Army history.
- April 26 – Second Lieutenant William Rhodes-Moorhouse of the Royal Flying Corps's No. 2 Squadron is mortally wounded while carrying out a bombing attack on a railway junction at Kortrijk, Belgium; he dies the next day. For the action, he posthumously will become the first airman of any sort while flying against the enemy to receive the Victoria Cross.

=== May ===
- The British War Office issues instructions specifying the aircraft and armament Royal Flying Corps squadrons are to have ready for defense of the United Kingdom against German airships. One aircraft is to be kept ready for immediate takeoff at all times, with the Martinsyde Scout preferred over other aircraft. The instruction also lists a specific mix and numbers of weapons the aircraft are to carry, including bombs, grenades, and incendiary darts.
- May 3
  - On patrol over the North Sea, the German Navy Zeppelin L 9, commanded by Kapitänleutnant Heinrich Mathy, encounters four British submarines on the surface and attacks them while HMS E5 fires at her and the other three dive; L 9 tries to bomb E5 as E5 dives, but does no damage. L 9 later catches HMS E4 on the surface and attacks with bombs, but E4 dives and survives as well. L 9 later sights another surfaced submarine and moves in to attack while the submarine fires at her, but the submarine dives before L 9 can attack.
  - The oldest continually operational Royal Air Force station, RAF Northolt (on the edge of London), opens as the home to the Royal Flying Corps' No. 4 Reserve Aeroplane Squadron.
- May 10–11 (overnight) – The Imperial German Army Zeppelin LZ 38 attempts to bomb Southend-on-Sea on England's Thames Estuary, but is driven off by unexpected gunfire. LZ 38's commander, Hauptmann Erich Linnarz, allegedly scrawls a threat to return on a calling card from his wallet and drops it in a weighted canister which the British find on Canvey Island.
- May 11 – An early attempt to intercept an airship with a shipborne aircraft takes place in the North Sea when the Royal Navy seaplane tender HMS Ben-my-Chree tries to launch a Royal Naval Air Service Sopwith seaplane to attack a German Zeppelin sighted low on the horizon at a range of 70 nautical miles (130 kilometres). The attempt fails when the launching platform collapses, and the unmolested Zeppelin goes on to bomb four surfaced British submarines – without damaging them.
- May 16–17 (overnight) – Two Royal Naval Air Service Avro 504s intercept the Imperial German Navy Zeppelins LZ 38 and LZ 39, badly damaging LZ39 with four 20-lb (9-kg) bombs dropped on its envelope from above.
- May 23 – Italy enters World War I on the side of the Allies, declaring war on Austria-Hungary.
- May 24 – Italy's only dirigible, Città de Ferrara, bombs Pola, beginning Italy's bombing campaign against Austria-Hungary.
- May 26 – Oberleutnant Kästner and Lt Georg Langhoff score the first German air-to-air victory of World War I.
- May 31-June 1 (overnight) – The Imperial German Navy Zeppelin LZ 38 carries out the first air raid on London, killing seven people and injuring 14.

=== June ===
- While scouting to protect German minesweepers in the North Sea, the German Navy Zeppelin L 5 encounters a force of Royal Navy light cruisers and destroyers while at low altitude. The light cruiser HMS Arethusa quickly launches a Sopwith seaplane which is closing rapidly on L 5 when its pilot mistakes smoke from British destroyers as a recall signal and abandons the chase, ending one of the most promising early opportunities for the interception of an airship by a shipborne aircraft.
- June 1 – The United States Department of the Navy awards its first contract for an airship – the DN-1-Class Blimp – to the Connecticut Aircraft Company.
- June 7 – The German Army Zeppelin LZ 37 becomes the first airship destroyed in air-to-air combat when Flight Sub-Lieutenant Reginald Warneford of the Royal Naval Air Service's No. 1 Squadron, flying a Morane-Saulnier L, destroys her with air-to-air bombing over Ghent, Belgium. LZ 37 crashes in Sint-Amandsberg, Belgium, killing one person on the ground and all but one of the crew. Within 36 hours, Warneford is the second-ever Commonwealth pilot, following William Rhodes-Moorhouse two months earlier, to receive the Victoria Cross for the action.
- June 15 – French airplanes raid Baden and Karlsruhe, Germany.
- June 17 – Shortly after a ceremony in Paris in which he receives the French Légion d'honneur for shooting down the Zeppelin LZ 37 on June 7, Royal Naval Air Service Flight Sub-Lieutenant Reginald Warneford dies along with American journalist Henry Beach Newman in the crash of a new Farman biplane during takeoff from Buc, France.
- June 23 – The Royal Flying Corps decrees that all aircraft with covered fuselages use the tricolor roundel on the sides of their fuselages. Previously, the roundel was used only on the wings.

=== July ===
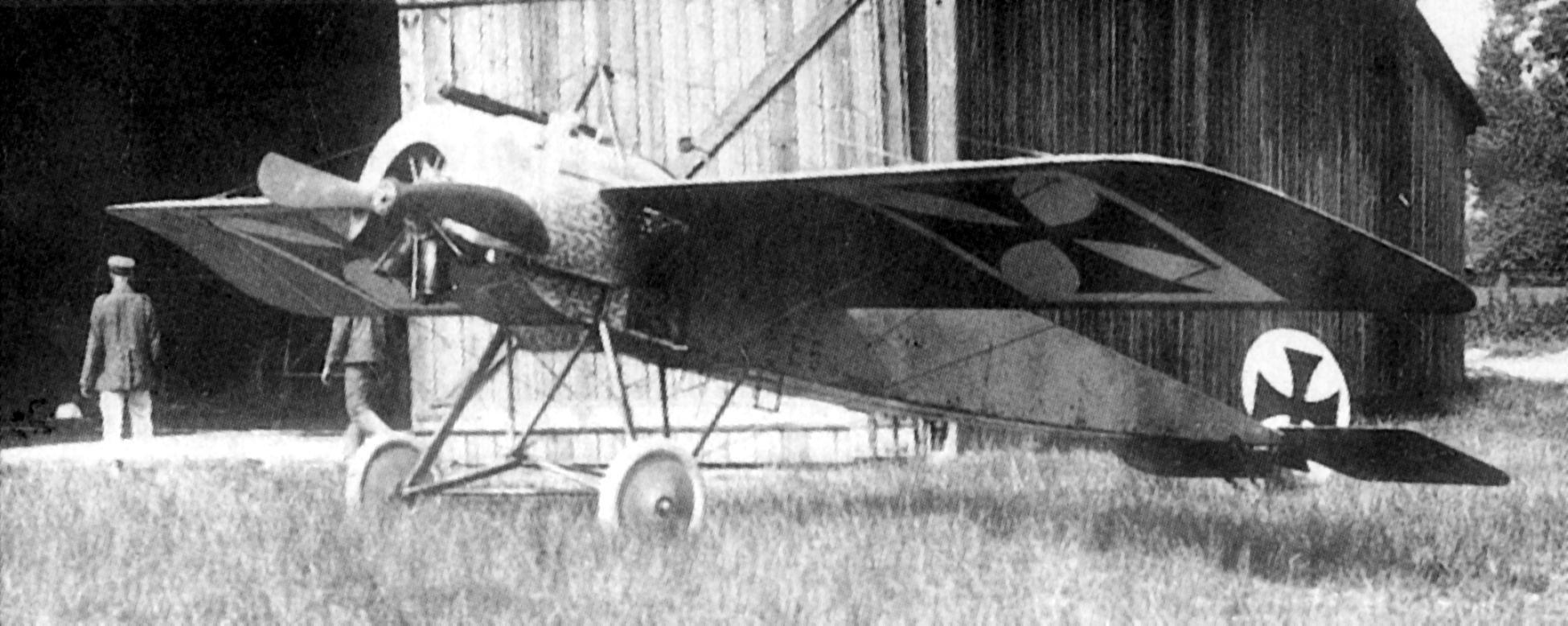
Leutnant Kurt Wintgens' "E.5/15" Fokker Eindecker production prototype, as it appeared for the July 1 combat engagement

- July 1
  - German Leutnant Kurt Wintgens, flying the Idflieg-serialed E.5/15 Fokker M.5K/MG production prototype of the Fokker Eindecker fighter (one of five built) armed with a Parabellum MG14 gun, achieves the first aerial victory using a synchronization gear which allows a machine gun to shoot through a turning propeller without hitting its blades, downing a Morane-Saulnier L two-seat "parasol" observation aircraft over the Western Front. His victory begins the period that will become known as the "Fokker Scourge," in which German Fokker Eindeckers will take a heavy toll of Allied aircraft over the Western Front. Wintgens would down two more Morane Type L two-seaters, one each on July 4 and 15, with the July 15 victory being his first confirmed victory, all achieved with E.5/15.
  - The French Navy seaplane carrier Pas-de-Calais is commissioned. She is the first paddle steamer to serve as an aviation vessel.
  - The United States Department of the Navy establishes an Office of Naval Aeronautics, the first formal recognition of naval aviation within the United States Navy bureaucracy.
- July 4 – A force of six German Navy airships (five Zeppelins and a Schütte-Lanz) sets out to attack a Royal Navy force of light cruisers, destroyers, and the seaplane tender HMS Engadine operating in the German Bight to conduct an aerial reconnaissance of the Ems estuary and Borkum and intercept reacting German airships. The British reconnaissance achieves nothing, British seaplanes are unable to launch in heavy seas to pursue the airships, the airships do no damage to the British ships, and although British ships fire on some of the airships, they fail to shoot any down.
- July 6 – The German ace Leutnant Oswald Boelcke claims his first victory, a Blériot Parasol, while flying an Albatros C.I two-seater with Leutnant von Wühlisch as the observer and gunner.
- July 19 – Flying a Morane-Saulnier L monoplane named Vieux Charles, the French ace Georges Guynemer scores the first of his 54 victories, shooting down a German Aviatik.

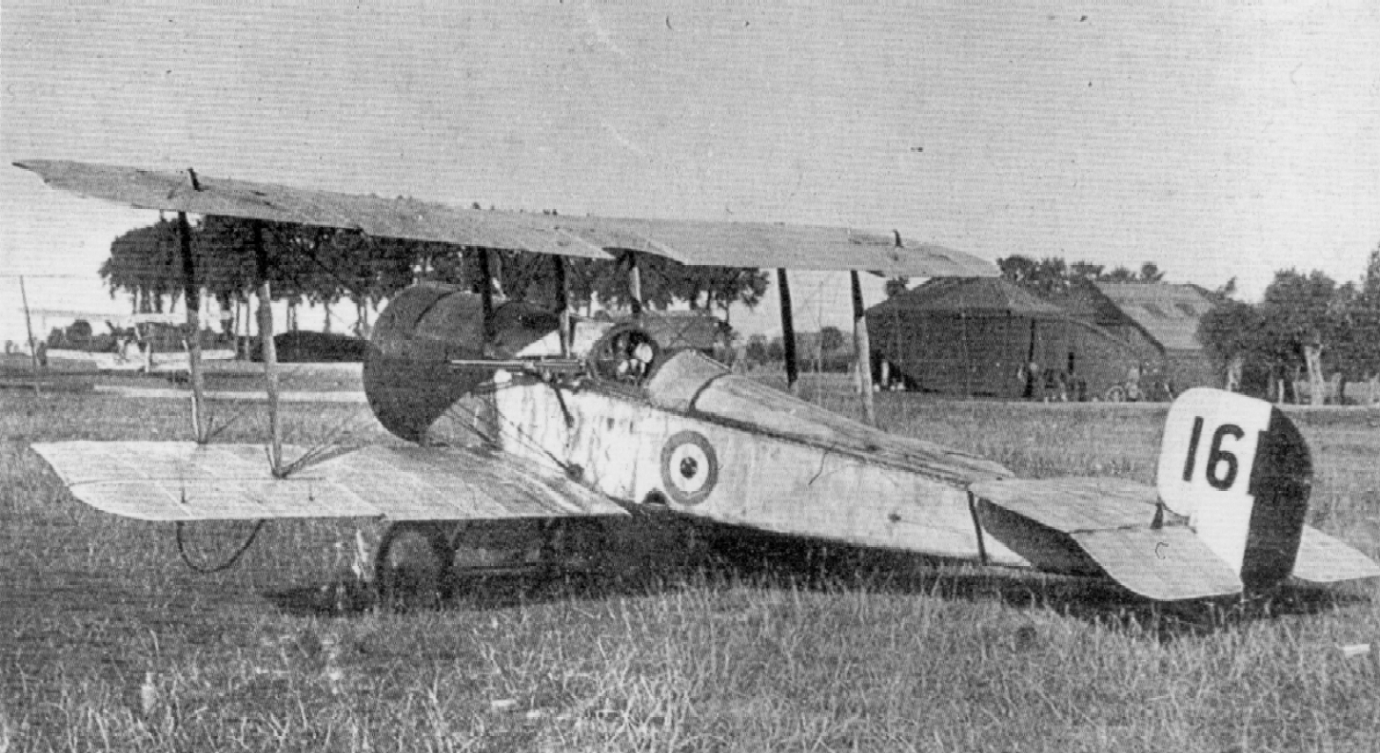
Capt. Lanoe Hawker's Bristol Scout C, No. 1611, as it appeared for his Victoria Cross-earning engagement.

- July 25 – Following his bombing raid exploits on the Gontrode zeppelin base some three months earlier, while flying a Lewis machine gun-armed Bristol Scout C, military s/n 1611, Royal Flying Corps Captain Lanoe Hawker shoots down three German aircraft while on patrol over Passchendaele, Belgium. For this achievement, he will become the first single-seat scout/fighter pilot to be awarded the Victoria Cross for combat against enemy airplanes.

=== August ===
- Future Italian Fascist leader Benito Mussolini rides in an airplane for the first time. He will begin flying lessons in July 1919 and qualify as a pilot in May 1921.
- August 1 -– Leutnant Max Immelmann shoots down his first aircraft with the lMG 08-armed production Fokker E.I, E.13/15, beginning his career as an ace.
- August 2 – Building upon 1913 flying-off experiments aboard HMS Hermes, an aircraft takes off from a platform aboard a fully operational British aviation ship for the first time, when a Sopwith Baby equipped with wheeled floats takes off from HMS Campania.
- August 6–9 – Plagued by weather and communications problems, German Navy airships prove unable to provide effective reconnaissance support to a minelaying sortie by the German auxiliary cruiser SMS Meteor, which scuttles herself when she is intercepted by British light cruisers and destroyers.
- August 10–11 (overnight) – Led personally by the chief of the Naval Airship Division, Peter Strasser, five German Navy Zeppelins raid England. L 9 bombs Goole, destroying some houses and warehouses and killing 16 people. The other four attempt to bomb London, but fail to reach the city, and instead bomb Eastchurch Naval Air Station, Dover (where three men are injured), and parts of the Thames Estuary. Damaged by a British 3-inch (76.2-mm) antiaircraft gun L 12 comes down in the North Sea on the way home and is towed into Ostend, Belgium, by a German torpedo boat.
- August 12 – Flying a Short Type 184 from HMS Ben-my-Chree. Royal Naval Air Service Flight Commander Charles Edmonds becomes the first pilot to attack a ship with an air-launched torpedo, torpedoing a 5,000-gross-register-ton Turkish supply ship during the Dardanelles Campaign.
- August 12–13 (overnight) – Four German Navy airships attempt to bomb England. Two turn back short of England, while L 10 bombs Harwich, destroying two houses, and L 12 finds no targets and barely makes it home after encountering violent thunderstorms over the North Sea.
- August 17–18 (overnight) – Four German Navy airships attempt to bomb London. Two turn back with engine trouble, and L 11 mistakenly bombs open fields near Ashford and Faversham. L 10, however, becomes the first German Navy airship ever to reach London, but thinking she is over central London she mistakenly bombs Leyton, hitting the railroad station and a number of houses, killing 10 people and injuring 48.
- August 19 – Flying a Fokker M.5K/MG bearing IdFlieg serial number E.3/15, fitted with a gun synchronizer and Parabellum MG 14 machine gun, Leutnant Oswald Boelcke shoots down his first aircraft.
- August 20 – The first sustained aerial bombing offensive is made by Italian Caproni Ca.2s against Austria-Hungary. The Ca.2 becomes the first Italian bomber to strike enemy positions during World War I.
- August 31 – The first French ace, Adolphe Pegoud, is killed in combat. He had scored six victories.

=== September ===
- September 3–4 (overnight) – Four Imperial German Navy airships attempt to bomb England. One of them, L 10, is struck by lightning and crashes in flames in the North Sea near Neuwerk, Germany, with the loss of her entire 20-man crew.
- September 7 – A force of Royal Navy ships in the North Sea bombarding Imperial German Army positions at Ostend, Belgium, comes under attack by German aircraft, which bomb the scout cruiser HMS Attentive. Attentive suffers two killed and seven wounded, and the Royal Navy force disperses briefly before returning to resume its bombardment.
- September 7–8 (overnight) – Two Imperial German Army airships raid England. One, the Schütte-Lanz SL-2, bombs Millwall, Deptford, Greenwich, and Woolwich docks, but crash-lands in Germany short of her base after suffering engine failure on the way home. The other, the Zeppelin LZ 74, drops most of her 2,000-kg (4,409-lb) bombload on greenhouses in Cheshunt before dropping her lone remaining incendiary bomb onto a shop on Fenchurch Street in London.
- September 8–9 (overnight) – Four German Navy Zeppelins attempt to bomb England. Two suffer engine trouble, while L 9, attacks a benzole plant at Skinningrove, Yorkshire, but her bombs fail to penetrate the roof of the benzol house or of a neighboring TNT store, and there are no casualties. L 13, however, bombs London – including the dropping of a 300-kg (661-lb) bomb, the largest yet dropped on Britain – killing 22 people and inflicting the most damage – valued at £530,787 – in a single airship or airplane bombing raid throughout all of World War I. Her commander, Kapitänleutnant Heinrich Mathy, becomes a great hero in Germany.
- September 12
  - Flying a Nieuport 10 named le Demon ("The Demon"), Jan Olieslagers forces a German Aviatik C.I down, becoming the first Belgian pilot to score an aerial victory.
  - Fearing large-scale British retaliatory raids for German airship raids against London and resentful of German Navy publicity about the achievements of naval airships in bombing the city, Chief of the German General Staff General Erich von Falkenhayn issues a statement pointing out that German Army airships are restricted to bombing London's docks and harbor works and are prohibited from attacking the central City of London.
- September 14 – Admiral Henning von Holtzendorff, Chief of the German Naval Staff, restricts German naval airships bombing London to targets along the banks of the River Thames and directs them as far as possible to avoid bombing the poorer, working-class northern quarter of the city.

=== October ===
- October 13–14 (overnight) – After a five-week hiatus, German airships resume raids against the United Kingdom, as five German Navy Zeppelins attempt to bomb London. L 15 bombs central London, during which Royal Flying Corps pilot John Slessor, flying a B.E.2c, intercepts her, becoming the first man to intercept an enemy aircraft over the United Kingdom, although he is unable to fire on L 15. The other four Zeppelins scatter their bombs over various towns and the countryside. The raid is one of the deadliest of World War I, killing 71 people and injuring 128.
- October 14 – Bulgaria enters World War I on the side of the Central Powers. During October, the Imperial Russian Navy's Black Sea Fleet raids Varna, Bulgaria, employing a seaplane carrier-battleship force.
- October 15 – Orville Wright sells the Wright Company – which he had founded in 1909 with his late brother Wilbur Wright – to a group of New York investors.
- October 18 – The Third Battle of the Isonzo begins. It will last until 3 November, and during the battle Italian aircraft will make their first contribution to Italy's ground war."

=== November ===
- November 1 – The Royal Naval Air Service adopts the same roundel as used by the Royal Flying Corps and discontinues the use of the Union Jack on fuselage sides.
- November 3 – Royal Naval Air Service Flight Sub-Lieutenant Fowler makes the first British take-off of an aircraft with a conventional, wheeled undercarriage from a ship when he flies a Bristol Scout from HMS Vindex.
- November 6 – The United States Navy armored cruiser USS North Carolina becomes the first warship to launch an aircraft by catapult, launching a Curtiss AB-2 flying boat piloted by Lieutenant Commander Henry C. Mustin over her stern.
- November 13 – Flying a BE.2c, Royal Naval Air Service Flight Commander J. R. W. Smyth-Pigott makes a daring night bombing attack on a bridge of the Berlin-Constantinople railway over the Maritsa River at Kuleli Burgas in the Ottoman Empire from an altitude of 300 feet (91 meters). Although the bridge survives, he receives the Distinguished Service Order for gallantry.
- November 19 – Royal Naval Air Service pilots Squadron Commander Richard Bell-Davies and Flight Sub-Lieutenant Gilbert Smylie are flying a bombing raid against a railway junction in Bulgaria when ground fire shoots down Smylie's Farman bomber. In history's first combat rescue mission by an aircraft, Bell-Davies lands his single-seater Nieuport 10, crams Smylie into it while Bulgarian infantrymen close in, and takes off, flying safely back to base. Bell-Davies receives the Victoria Cross for his actions.

=== December ===
- British officials become interested in procuring explosive and incendiary ammunition for use by aircraft against German airships. It will be issued to Royal Flying Corps home air defense squadrons in the summer of 1916.
- Imperial Japanese Army aviation gains a degree of independence for the first time when it is organized as the Air Battalion of the Army Transport Command.
- December 1 – The United States Army's 2d Aero Squadron is formed.
- December 12
  - German Leutnant Theodor Mallinckrodt makes the initial "hop" of the world's first practical all-metal aircraft, the Junkers J 1.
  - Gaston Caudron, co-founder with his brother René of the Caudron Aircraft Company, dies in the crash of Caudron R.4 he is testing at the airfield in Bron, France.

== First flights ==
- FBA Type H
- Nieuport 11
- Nieuport 12
- Siemens-Schuckert B
- Spring – Grigorovich M-5
- Late 1915
  - Halberstadt D.II
  - Siemens-Schuckert E.I
  - Siemens-Schuckert R.III

=== January ===
- Airco DH.1
- January 30 – Gotha FU (for Friedel-Ursinus), prototype of the Gotha G.I

=== March ===
- Caudron G.4
- March 8 – White & Thompson Bognor Bloater - 1171

=== April ===
- April 11 – Zeppelin-Staaken V.G.O.I

=== May ===
- May 21 – SPAD S.A-2
- May 24 – Siemens-Schuckert G.I, later redesignated Siemens-Schuckert R.I

=== June ===
- Caudron R.4
- June 1 – Airco DH.2
- June 4 – Marinens Flyvebaatfabrikk M.F.1

=== August ===
- August 14 – Royal Aircraft Factory B.E.9

=== October ===
- October 26 – Siemens-Schuckert R.II

=== September ===
- Nieuport 14

=== November ===
- November 20 – Felixstowe Porte Baby

=== December ===
- Sopwith 1½ Strutter
- December 12 – Junkers J 1, the first practical all-metal aircraft
- December 15 – Anatra D
- December 17 – Handley Page O/400, with Rolls-Royce Eagle engines, the first flight of an aero engine built by Rolls-Royce Limited

== Entered service ==
- Aviatik B.II with the German Luftstreitkräfte
- Farman F.40 with the Aéronautique Militaire, the aviation arm of the French Army
- Siemens-Schuckert B with the German Luftstreitkräfte

=== February ===
- February 5 - Vickers F.B.5 Gunbus with No. 5 Squadron RFC

=== April ===
- Avro 508
- Morane-Saulnier Type N

=== June ===
- Fokker Eindecker

=== September ===
- Royal Aircraft Factory FE.2 with No. 6 Squadron RFC

=== October ===
- October 13 – Siemens-Schuckert R.I with the German Luftstreitkräfte

=== November ===
- November 20 – Siemens-Schuckert R.II with the German Luftstreitkräfte

=== December ===
- December 30 – Siemens-Schuckert R.III with the German Luftstreitkräfte

== Retirements ==
=== November ===
- Nieuport-Macchi Parasol
