= Aviatik D.V =

Prototype German fighter plane of 1918

D.V

General information
- Type: Fighter
- National origin: Germany
- Manufacturer: Aviatik
- Number built: 1

History
- First flight: 1918

The Aviatik D.V was a prototype fighter aircraft built in Germany in 1918 but which was not selected for production.

Today, little is known of this one-off prototype, and no photographs are known to exist

== Design ==
Unlike the Aviatik D.IV, which was developed from the firm's D.III, the D.V was an all-new design. Like other Aviatik D-types, it was a single-bay biplane, but unlike them, it featured a wing cellule that was braced by struts only, without any bracing wires.

Like the D.IV, it was powered by the Benz Bz.IIIbv geared V8 engine. This was a larger displacement and more powerful version of the two Bz.IIIb subtypes that had been fitted to the D.III prototypes. None of these engines were mature yet.

== Specifications ==
Data from Herris 2014, p.63

General characteristics

- Crew: 1
- Powerplant: 1 × Benz Bz.IIIbv liquid-cooled, eight-cylinder V engine, 145 kW (194 hp)

== Notes ==
=== Bibliography ===
- Herris, Jack (2014). Aviatik Aircraft of WWI. Reno: Aeronaut Books.
- The Illustrated Encyclopedia of Aircraft. London: Aerospace Publishing. 1981.
