= Mann Egerton Type B =

Type B

General information
- Type: Maritime patrol seaplane
- Manufacturer: Mann Egerton and Company
- Primary user: Royal Naval Air Service
- Number built: 15

History
- First flight: 1916
- Developed from: Short Type 184

The Mann Egerton Type B was a 1910s British maritime patrol aircraft developed from the Short Type 184 by Mann Egerton and Company of Norwich.

== Design and development ==
Mann Egerton were given a contract in 1915 to build the Short Type 184, a two-seat reconnaissance, bombing and torpedo carrying seaplane. As a result of experience gained with the Short 184 contract the company developed an improved version. The most noticeable difference was an increase of span of the upper wing.

== Operational history ==
The Royal Naval Air Service operated all fifteen Type Bs on patrol duties.

== Operator ==
United Kingdom

- Royal Naval Air Service

== Specifications ==
Data from The British Bomber since 1914

General characteristics

- Crew: Two
- Length: 40 ft 7 in (12.38 m)
- Wingspan: 70 ft 0 in (21.34 m)
- Height: 13 ft 6 in (4.11 m)
- Powerplant: 1 × Sunbeam , 225 hp (168 kW)

Performance
