= Aviatik D.VI =

WWI German fighter aircraft

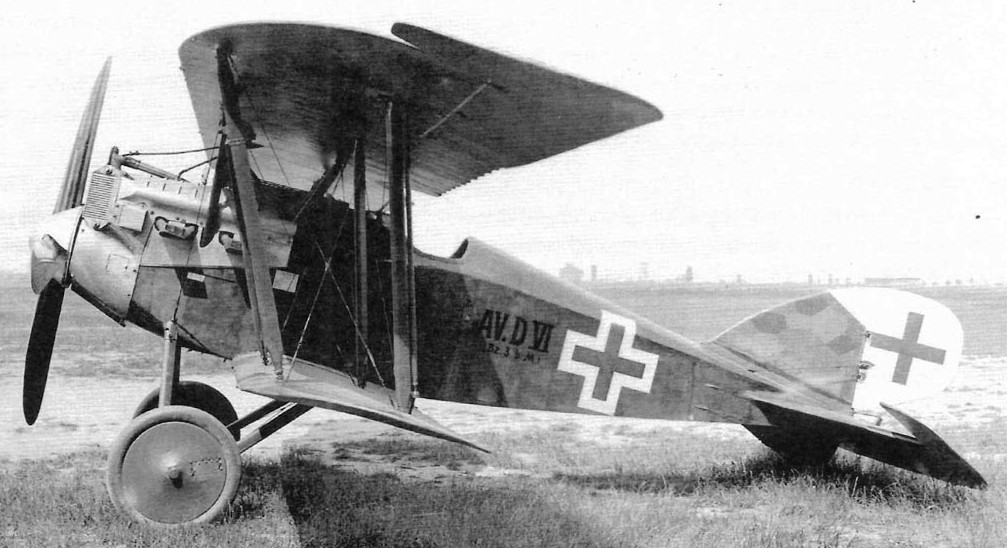
- Profile view of the Aviatik D.VI

General information
- Type: Experimental single-seat biplane fighter
- National origin: Germany
- Manufacturer: Aviatik
- Number built: 1

History
- First flight: August 1918

The Aviatik D.VI was a prototype single-seat, biplane fighter built by Automobil und Aviatik AG for the Imperial German Army's (Deutsches Heer) Imperial German Air Service (Luftstreitkräfte) during the First World War. The sole prototype made its first flight in mid-1918, but it was not placed into production because the Aviatik D.VII had better performance.

== Design and development ==
The D.VI was a single-seat, two-bay biplane of wooden construction with a plywood-covered fuselage and fabric-covered wings and tail surfaces. The water-cooled, 195-metric-horsepower (143 kW) Benz Bz.IIIbm V-eight piston engine was equipped with a gearbox and drove a wooden, fixed-pitch, four-bladed propeller that was fitted with a spinner. The engine was covered by a metal cowling. The radiator was located in front of the engine. Its armament comprised two fixed, forward-firing 7.92 mm (0.312 in) LMG 08/15 Spandau machine guns.

The D.VI was intended to participate in the Second Fighter Competition held at Adlershof in June 1918, but, owing to problems with the reduction gear of the Bz.IIIbm, it did not made its first fight until August. Nonetheless, it was there by July and was available to be inspected by pilots flying at the competition. By the time flight testing had revealed its excellent aerial characteristics, the D.VI had already been overtaken by the more maneuverable D.VII, which was a modified version of the D.VI.

== Specifications ==
Data from Aviatik Aircraft of WWI: A Centennial Perspective on Great War Airplane; The Complete Book of Fighters: An Illustrated Encyclopedia of Every Fighter Built and Flown

General characteristics

- Crew: 1
- Length: 6.10 m (20 ft 0 in)
- Wingspan: 9.66 m (31 ft 8 in)
- Height: 2.50 m (8 ft 2 in)
- Empty weight: 750 kg (1,653 lb)
- Max takeoff weight: 940 kg (2,072 lb)
- Powerplant: 1 × Benz Bz.IIIbm geared V-8 liquid-cooled piston engine , 149 kW (200 hp)

Performance

- Maximum speed: 188 km/h (117 mph, 102 kn)
- Time to altitude: 17.8 minutes to 5,000 m (16,000 ft)

Armament

- 2 × forward-firing synchronised 7.92 mm (0.312 in) LMG 08/15 "Spandau" machine guns

== Bibliography ==
- Gray, Peter & Thetford, Owen (1987) [1970]. German Aircraft of the First World War (2nd ed.). London: Putnam. ISBN 0-85177-809-7.
- Green, William & Swanborough, Gordon (2001) [1994]. The Complete Book of Fighters: An Illustrated Encyclopedia of Every Fighter Built and Flown (Revised and Updated ed.). London: Salamander Books. ISBN 1-84065-269-1.
- Herris, Jack (2023). Aviatik Aircraft of WWI: A Centennial Perspective on Great War Airplanes. Great War Aviation Centennial Series. Vol. 10 (2nd ed.). n.p.: Aeronaut Books. ISBN 978-1-953201-59-1.
