= Aviatik D.VII =

Fighter biplane prototype model

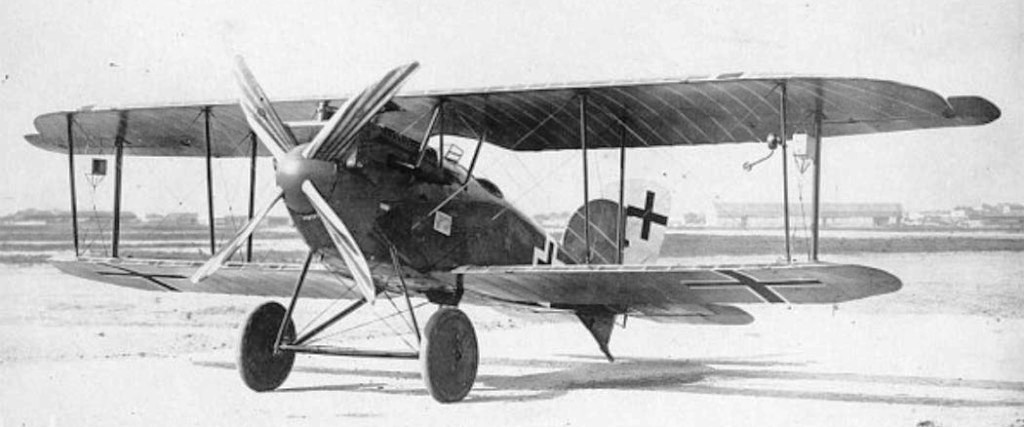
- A left-front oblique view of the Aviatik D.VII

General information
- Type: Experimental single-seat biplane fighter
- National origin: Germany
- Manufacturer: Aviatik
- Number built: 1 (+ 50?)

History
- First flight: 1918
- Developed from: Aviatik D.VI

The Aviatik D.VII was a prototype German single-seat biplane fighter aircraft built by Aviatik in the last year of the First World War. It could not participate in the Third Fighter Competition of October 1918 because it used the wrong engine and it saw no military service, although 50 aircraft were possibly found in storage after the war. The only significant change from the earlier Aviatik D.VI was a completely new tail structure.

== Design and development ==
The D.VI and D.VII were both single-seat, two-bay biplanes of wooden construction with a plywood-covered fuselage and fabric-covered wings and tail surfaces. Their water-cooled, 195-metric-horsepower (143 kW) Benz Bz.IIIbm V-eight piston engine was equipped with a gearbox and drove a wooden, fixed-pitch, four-bladed propeller that was fitted with a spinner. The engine was covered by a metal cowling. The radiator was located in front of the engine. Its armament comprised two fixed, forward-firing 7.92 mm (0.312 in) LMG 08/15 Spandau machine guns. The tail structure of the D.VII was revised and enlarged from that of the D.VI, significantly improving its maneuverability and flying qualities.

The Third Fighter Competition only allowed aircraft powered by the BMW IIIa engine to participate, so the D.VII was not demonstrated there. Aviation historians Jack Herris, William Green & Gordon Swanborough maintain that Aviatik covertly built 50 D.VIIs that the Inter-Allied Aeronautical Commission of Control discovered after the war, but this is not confirmed by historians Lennart Andersson and Ray Sanger in their book on postwar German aviation, Retribution and Recovery: German Aircraft and Aviation 1919 to 1922.

== Specifications ==
Data from The Complete Book of Fighters: An Illustrated Encyclopedia of Every Fighter Built and Flown; German Aircraft of the First World War

General characteristics

- Crew: 1
- Length: 6.10 m (20 ft 0 in)
- Wingspan: 9.66 m (31 ft 8 in)
- Height: 2.50 m (8 ft 2 in)
- Empty weight: 745 kg (1,642 lb)
- Max takeoff weight: 945 kg (2,083 lb)
- Powerplant: 1 × liquid-cooled Benz Bz.IIIbm geared V-8 engine , 145 kW (195 hp)
- Propellers: 2-bladed fixed-pitch propeller

Performance

- Maximum speed: 192 km/h (119 mph, 104 kn)
- Endurance: c. 1 hour
- Time to altitude: 24 minutes to 6,000 m (20,000 ft)

Armament
2 × fixed, forward-firing 7.92 mm (0.312 in) LMG 08/15 "Spandau" machine guns

== Bibliography ==
- Andersson, Lennart & Sanger, Ray (2014). Retribution and Recovery: German Aircraft and Aviation 1919 to 1922. Air-Britain (Historians). ISBN 978-0-85130-467-0.
- Gray, Peter & Thetford, Owen (1987) [1970]. German Aircraft of the First World War (2nd ed.). Putnam. ISBN 0-85177-809-7.
- Green, William & Swanborough, Gordon (2001) [1994]. The Complete Book of Fighters: An Illustrated Encyclopedia of Every Fighter Built and Flown (Revised and Updated ed.). Salamander Books. ISBN 1-84065-269-1.
- Herris, Jack (2023). Aviatik Aircraft of WWI: A Centennial Perspective on Great War Airplanes. Great War Aviation Centennial Series. Vol. 10 (2nd ed.). Aeronaut Books. ISBN 978-1-953201-59-1.
