= Aviatik C.I =

1915 German reconnaissance aircraft

C.I
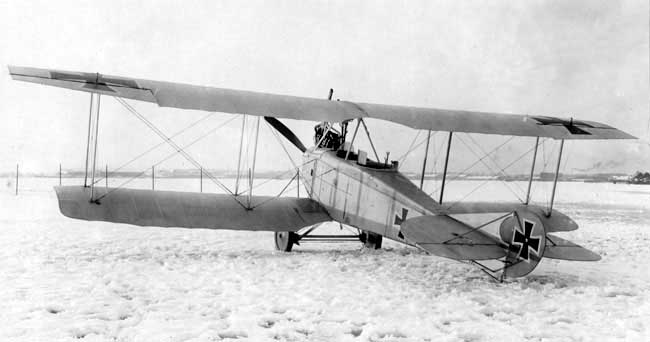
- Aviatik C.I trainer (late series)

General information
- Type: Reconnaissance aircraft
- Manufacturer: Aviatik

History
- Introduction date: 1915
- First flight: 1915
- Retired: 1917

The Aviatik C.I was an observation aircraft designed and produced by the German aircraft manufacturer Aviatik. It was the first aircraft produced by the company to be mass-produced as well as one of the first German military aircraft of the First World War to become fairly well known amongst the general public of the era.

It was a development of the Aviatik B.I and B.II models, being one of first aircraft of the new German C class of armed biplanes. On the C.I, the observer sat in front of the pilot; this arrangement was unique amongst the C class, which opted to place the pilot in the forward position instead. The positions of the pilot and observer were reversed in last series of 50, ordered in 1917 solely for training purposes. There was only a single aircraft completed of the refined C.Ia version in May 1916, with armament still in a forward cab, serving as a prototype for the C.III.

Operationally, the C.I was introduced in 1915; it was typically flown in flights of three to six aircraft; the destruction of one aircraft on 7 November 1915 was considered a such a feat that the Royal Flying Corps pilot responsible was awarded the Victoria Cross. In response to demands for greater performance, Aviatik developed several derivatives of the aircraft, including the Aviatik C.II and the C.III, which were equipped with more powerful engines and various refinements, although the airframes would typically have little modification. 548 Aviatik C.I were built in total: 402 by Aviatik (including 51 trainers and 1 C.Ia) and 146 by Hannover.

== Design and development ==
Prior to the outbreak of the First World War, the German aircraft manufacturer Aviatik had built up a favourable relationship for its early aircraft. Following the start of the conflict, the company quickly turned its attention to Germany's wartime needs. The resulting aircraft from this endeavour, designed C.I, was the company's first aircraft be produced on a large scale. Developed during late 1914 and early 1915, the C.I was powered by a single Mercedes D.III six-cylinder in-line piston engine and armed with a single machine gun for self-defence purposes. The latter was operated by the aerial observer and clipped on a sliding mounting fitted on a rail at either side of the cockpit; a quick-release mechanism allowed for it to be readily swapped from one side of the cockpit to the other as required. Unusually amongst German aircraft of the era, the observer was positioned in front of the pilot; this arrangement restricted the range of fire of the machine gun along with the field of vision for performing observations. Due to these shortcomings, the seating arrangement was reversed on later-built aircraft.

In terms of its construction, the C.I was relatively orthodox for the era. The fuselage had a box-girder structure comprising four spruce longerons and members that were braced using stranded steel cables. It had a rounded top decking that tapered towards the rear to form a vertical knife-edge while the forward end terminated in a sheet plate that was fretted with lightening holes. This plate, in conjunction with the first two formers, supported the engine bearers, which were further braced sing steel tubing. The engine was surrounded by curved aluminium panels, although the cylinder block remained exposed; aluminium sheeting also covered the sides and underside of the nose while the majority of the fuselage was covered by fabric. The exhaust manifold was an obstruction to forward visibility. Early-build C.Is had their radiators, however, the majority of aircraft were fitted with an improved Teeves and Braun-built unit that was mounted on the front of the center-section wing struts.

The wings were rectangular, covered with fabric, and comprised all-wood construction except for the compression struts, which were made of steel tubing. The primary spars were produced in two halves and joined together with hardwood tongues to form hollow box-spars; the trailing edge of the wing formed its characteristic scalloped outline. A set of unbalanced parallel-chord were hinged directly to the rear spar at the upper wing tips. The inverted trestle-type cabane strut and every interplane strut was composed of streamlined steel tubing and braced with stranded wires. The interplane bay featured unusual bracing, the forward wire being anchored to the rear spar junction of the fuselage while the rear wire was anchored to the inner struts and terminally anchored to the top longeron; this arrangement proved superior for the use of the aircraft's machine gun.

A typical V-shaped undercarriage was used, the struts of which joined with a compact horizontal tube at its apex that functioned as the anchor point for a rubber chord that acted as a shock absorber. The undercarriage was braced by stranded cables between the front legs while an elliptical tube spreader-bar joined the legs forward of the axle and a wire strained connected them behind the axle. Almost all of the tail surfaces, save for the wooden tail plane ribs, were composed of light-gauge steel tubing. The tailplane had a distinctive kidney shape while the rudder, which was balanced, had a comma shape. A lengthy and narrow triangular fin was also present, which was braced to the tailplane via a light steel strut; the underside of the tailplane was itself braced to the fuselage by a pair of light struts.

During 1916, in response to military demands for superior performance, Aviatik developed the improved C.III. It was a refined C.I, having cleaned up nose contours, a redesigned exhaust manifold, a new aerofoil-style radiator and an enlarged spinner fitted to the propeller. The wingspan was also reduced along with the chord of the ailerons, the fuel system was improved; however, the airframe was virtually identical to that of the C.I. These changes resulted in the C.III being 18 kmph faster than its predecessor while also improving its forward visibility considerably.

== Variants ==
C.I
Primary model
C.I(Han)
Primary model licence-built by Hannover, initially designated Hannover C.I
C.I trainer
Last series of 50 plus a prototype manufactured in 1917, with a machine gun in rear cab.
C.Ia
Prototype for C.III, flown in May–June 1916.
C.II
This model was powered by a 149 kW (200 hp) Benz Bz.IV engine. it was not produced in quantity.
C.III
The C.III was a 1916 refinement which was operated until 1917.

== Operators ==
Austria-Hungary

- KuKLFT

German Empire

- Luftstreitkrafte

Romania

- Romanian Air Corps

Kingdom of Yugoslavia

- Royal Yugoslav Air Force - Postwar

== Specifications ==
Data from German Aircraft of the First World War

General characteristics

- Crew: Two
- Length: 7.925 m (26 ft 0 in)
- Wingspan: 12.5 m (41 ft 0 in)
- Height: 2.95 m (9 ft 8 in)
- Wing area: 43 m^{2} (460 sq ft)
- Empty weight: 750 kg (1,653 lb)
- Gross weight: 1,340 kg (2,954 lb)
- Powerplant: 1 × Mercedes D.III six-cylinder water-cooled in-line piston engine, 119 kW (160 hp)
- Propellers: 2-bladed fixed-pitch propeller

Performance

- Maximum speed: 142 km/h (88 mph, 77 kn)
- Endurance: Three hours
- Service ceiling: 3,500 m (11,500 ft)
- Time to altitude: 1,000 m (3,300 ft) in 12 minutes
- Wing loading: 31.2 kg/m^{2} (6.4 lb/sq ft)
- Power/mass: 0.089 kW/kg (0.054 hp/lb)

Armament

- Guns: 1x Parabellum MG14 mounted on cockpit side rails
