= Short Bomber =

British aircraft

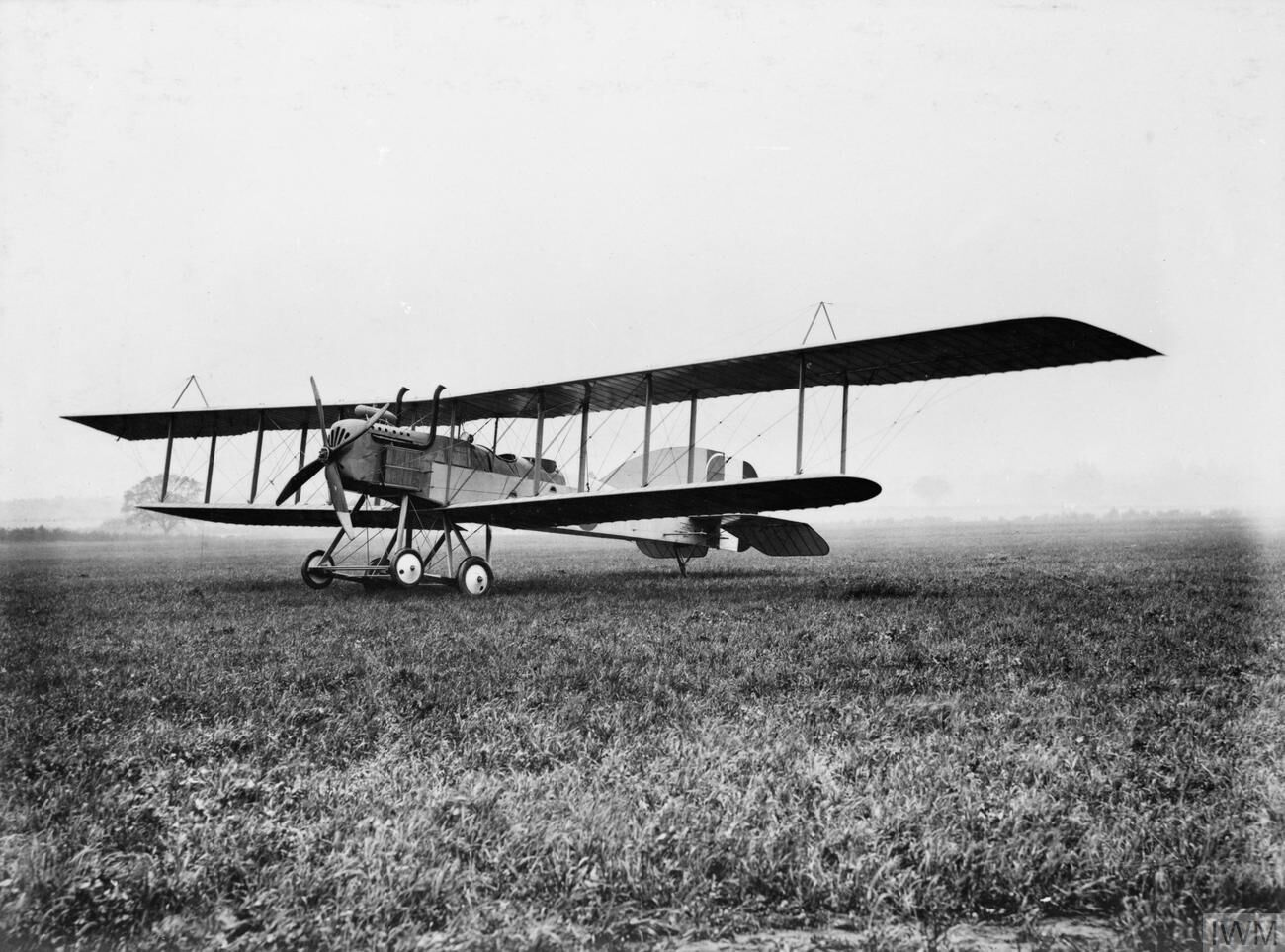

General information
- Type: Long-range reconnaissance bomber
- Manufacturer: Short Brothers
- Primary users: Royal Naval Air Service (RNAS) Royal Flying Corps (RFC)
- Number built: 83

History
- Introduction date: 1916
- First flight: 1915
- Retired: April 1917

The Short Bomber was a British two-seat long-range reconnaissance, bombing and torpedo-carrying aircraft designed by Short Brothers as a land-based development of the very successful Short Type 184 (of which more than 900 were built and many exported).

== Design and development ==
The Bomber was a three-bay biplane of wooden structure with fabric covering, originally developed from the Short 184 seaplane's fuselage combined with wings developed from those on the Short Admiralty Type 166 seaplane. The fuselage was of box section with curved upper decking mounted on the lower wing. The tailplane included a split elevator with a single fin and rudder. The undercarriage consisted of a four-wheeled assembly under the nose and a skid under the tail. The crew of two sat in tandem open cockpits behind the wing; initially the observer/gunner sat in the forward cockpit so that he could stand up to operate the machine gun mounted on the upper wing. This somewhat precarious activity was rendered unnecessary by the invention of the gun ring-mount; in production aircraft the pilot occupied the forward cockpit with the gunner behind him in the rear cockpit, which was fitted with dual controls.

It was powered by a Rolls-Royce Eagle or a Sunbeam engine mounted in the nose, driving a two-bladed propeller. Armament comprised a rear-facing Lewis Gun as well as provision for one 14 inch Whitehead torpedo or various bombs up to 920 lb.

Initial testing with the prototype by Shorts' test pilot, Ronald Kemp, revealed that it was unable to carry the required bombload of six 112-lb (50.8 kg) bombs, so the wingspan was increased by 12 ft. This provided the required lift but at the same time rendered the aircraft unstable in both pitch and yaw. The fuselage length was increased by 4 ft 5 in (1.35 m), which solved the problem. Large numbers of the Bomber had already been ordered from Shorts and a number of other light engineering companies; the latter produced aircraft to the original drawings but all 'short' Short Bombers were modified to the longer form before acceptance.

== Operational history ==
The Short Bomber was intended for long-range missions; the maximum flight duration was approximately six hours. The first Bomber flew in 1915 and more than 80 aircraft were built, 36 by Short Brothers, the rest being manufactured by Mann Egerton (20), Sunbeam (15), Parnall (6) and Phoenix Aircraft Ltd (7). The Short Bomber entered service in late 1916 with No. 7 Squadron RNAS, flying its first bombing raid on the night of 15 November 1916, with four Shorts, each carrying eight 65 lb (30 kg) bombs, attacking targets at Ostend in Belgium along with 18 Caudron G.4s. 7 Squadron RNAS continued bombing operations through the winter of 1916–17, but the Short Bomber was underpowered and was taken out of service in April 1917, when more powerful aircraft (notably the twin-engined Handley Page Type O/100) entered service. One of its last combat operations involved attacking the Zeebrugge Mole on four successive nights in April 1917, in preparation for the naval raid on St. George's Day (23 April).

== Operators ==
United Kingdom

- Royal Naval Air Service
  - No. 7 Squadron RNAS
- Royal Flying Corps

== Specifications ==
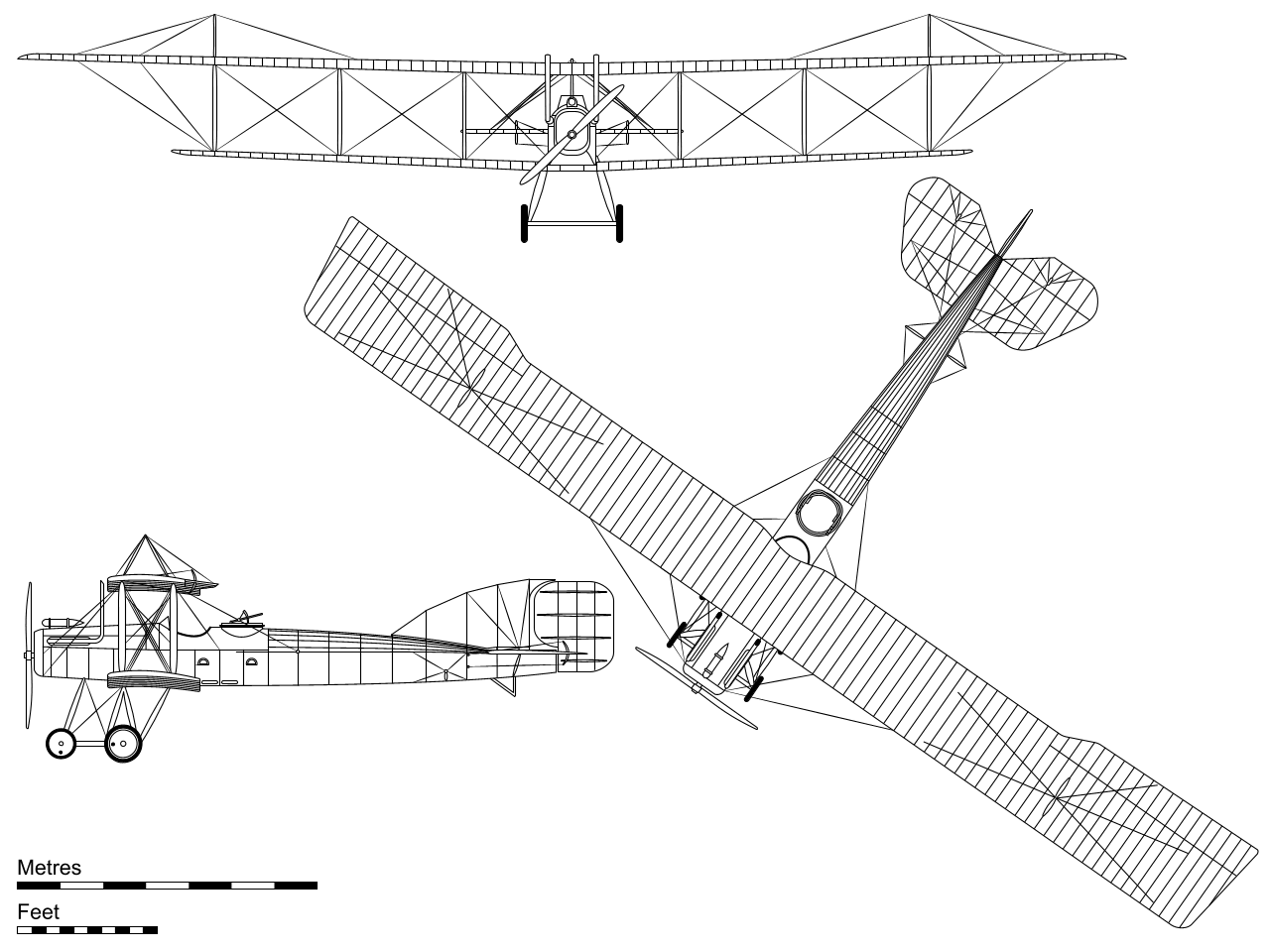
3-view projection of the Short Bomber.

Data from The British Bomber since 1914

General characteristics

- Crew: 2
- Length: 45 ft 0 in (13.72 m)
- Wingspan: 84 ft 0 in (25.60 m)
- Height: 15 ft 0 in (4.57 m)
- Wing area: 870 sq ft (81 m^{2})
- Empty weight: 5,000 lb (2,268 kg)
- Gross weight: 6,800 lb (3,084 kg)
- Powerplant: 1 × Rolls-Royce Eagle water-cooled V12 engine, 250 hp (190 kW)

Performance

- Maximum speed: 77 mph (124 km/h, 67 kn) at 6,500 ft (1,980 m)
- Endurance: 6 hr
- Service ceiling: 10,600 ft (3,200 m) (absolute ceiling)
- Time to altitude: 45 min to 10,000 ft (3,050 m)

Armament

- Guns: 1× 0.303 in (7.7 mm) Lewis machine gun on Scarff ring
- Bombs: 8x 112 lb (51 kg) bombs

== See also ==
Related development

- Short Type 184

Related lists

- List of aircraft of the Fleet Air Arm
- List of aircraft of the Royal Air Force
