= Aviatik C.VI =

Prototype WWI German observation aircraft

C.VI
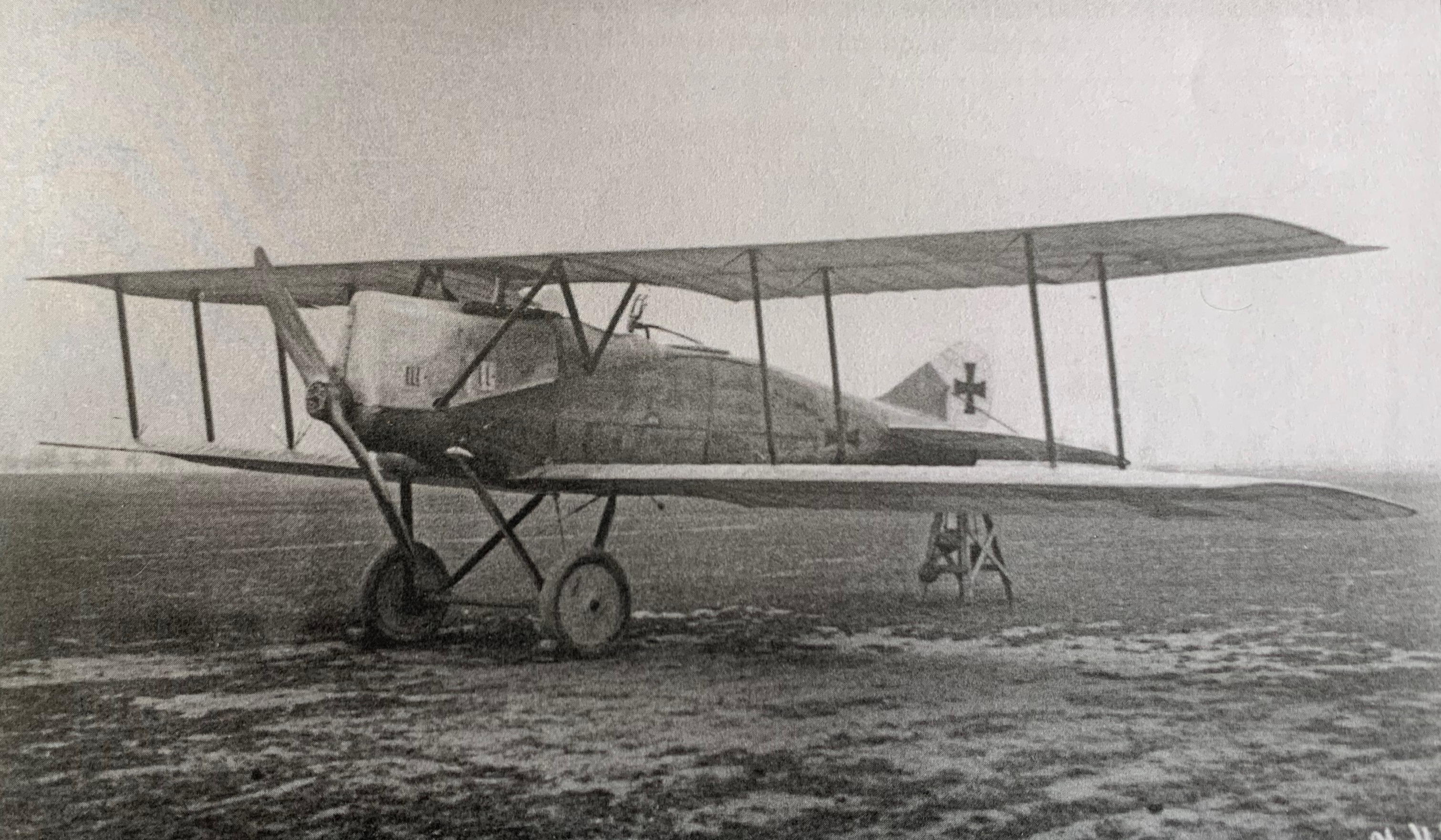
- An oblique view of the prototype Aviatik C.VI, c. 1916

General information
- Type: Reconnaissance aircraft
- Manufacturer: Aviatik
- Number built: 1

The Aviatik C.VI was a prototype German biplane observation aircraft built by Aviatik during World War I. Based on the earlier Aviatik C.V, the C.VI had a more powerful engine and other improvements. Only a single aircraft was built.

== Design ==
The C.VI was a development of the C.V with a water-cooled, 200 hp (150 kW) inline 6-cylinder Benz Bz.IV piston engine. It replaced the earlier aircraft's upper gull wing with a conventional two-bay wing and added a vertical stabilizer. The propeller spinner of the earlier aircraft was eliminated, but the C.VI retained the two-seat configuration of the C.V with the pilot in the forward cockpit and the observer in the rear cockpit.

These changes made the C.VI easier to produce and improved its flying qualities over the Aviatik C.V, but only a single prototype was constructed because it did not exceed the performance of the DFW C.V already in production by Aviatik.

=== Confusion with the license-built DFW C.V ===
Aviation historians Peter Gray and Owen Thetford admit that there has been confusion about which aircraft has been designated as the Aviatik C.VI in the past, but state that that name was used for the license-built DFW C.V in their 1970 book. Aviation historian Jack Herris notes that when the German Army's (Deutsches Heer) Inspectorate of Flying Troops (Inspektion der Fliegertruppen (Idflieg)) initially awarded contracts for license building another company's design, the aircraft received a designation in the builder's sequence; for example Aviatik manufactured the Halberstadt D.II as the Aviatik D.I. Sometime in late 1916 Idflieg decided to reduce the confusion and added an abbreviation for the manufacturer after the designer's designation; thus the Aviatik D.I became the Halberstadt D.II(Av).

Idflieg awarded Aviatik and other companies a contract to build DFW C.Vs in October 1916 using the old naming system, but it was changed to the revised designation in subsequent batches as photographic evidence of aircraft with the stenciled D.F.W. CV(Av) name exists.

== Specifications ==
Data from Aviatik Aircraft of WWI: A Centennial Perspective on Great War Airplanes

General characteristics

- Crew: 2
- Powerplant: 1 × Benz Bz.IV 6-cylinder water-cooled in-line piston engine, 150 kW (200 hp)
- Propellers: 2-bladed fixed-pitch propeller

== Bibliography ==
- Gray, Peter & Thetford, Owen (1987) [1970]. German Aircraft of the First World War (2nd ed.). London: Putnam. ISBN 0-85177-809-7.
- Grosz, P. M. (1995). DFW C.V. Windsock Datafile. Vol. 53. Berkhamsted, UK: Albatros Productions. ISBN 0-948414-70-7.
- Herris, Jack (2023). Aviatik Aircraft of WWI: A Centennial Perspective on Great War Airplanes. Great War Aviation Centennial Series. Vol. 10 (2nd ed.). n.p.: Aeronaut Books. ISBN 978-1-953201-59-1.
