= Albatros D.X =

D.X
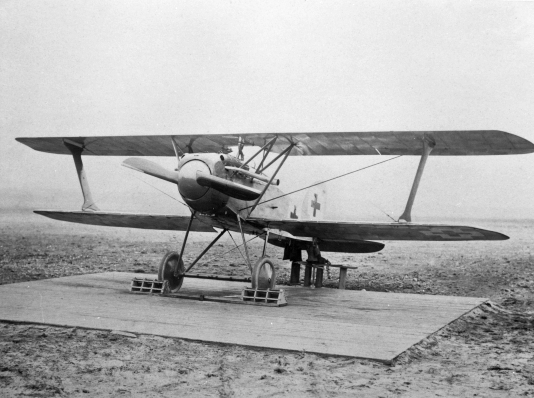

General information
- Type: Fighter
- National origin: Germany
- Manufacturer: Albatros Flugzeugwerke
- Status: Prototype only
- Number built: 1

History
- First flight: 1918
- Variant: Albatros Dr.II

The Albatros D.X was a German prototype single-seat fighter biplane developed in 1918 in parallel with the Albatros D.IXme

== Design and development ==
The D.X used the same slab-sided and flat-bottomed fuselage as the D.IX, which was a departure from previous Albatros designs, but was powered by a 145 kW (195 hp) Benz Bz.IIIb water-cooled V8 engine in place of the D.IX's Mercedes D.IIIa straight-six.

The D.X participated in the second D-type contest at Adlershof in June 1918, but development ceased at the prototype stage.

== Specifications (D.X) ==
Data from German Aircraft of the First World War

General characteristics

- Crew: 1
- Length: 6.18 m (20 ft 3 in)
- Wingspan: 9.84 m (32 ft 3 in)
- Height: 2.75 m (9 ft 0 in)
- Empty weight: 666 kg (1,468 lb)
- Gross weight: 905 kg (1,995 lb)
- Powerplant: 1 × Benz Bz.IIIbo V-8 water-cooled piston engine, 145 kW (195 hp)

Performance

- Maximum speed: 170 km/h (110 mph, 92 kn)
- Endurance: 1 hour 30 minutes
- Rate of climb: 3.79 m/s (746 ft/min)
- Time to altitude: 5,000 m (16,404 ft) in 22 minutes

Armament

- Guns: 2x 7.92 mm (0.312 in) LMG 08/15 machine guns

== See also ==
Related development

- Albatros D.IX
- Albatros Dr.II

== Bibliography ==
- Gray, Peter; Owen Thetford (1970). German Aircraft of the First World War (2nd ed.). London: Putnam & Company. ISBN 0-370-00103-6.
- Green, William; Gordon Swanborough (September 1995). The Complete Book of Fighters (1st ed.). Smithmark. ISBN 978-0-8317-3939-3.
