= Aviatik C.V =

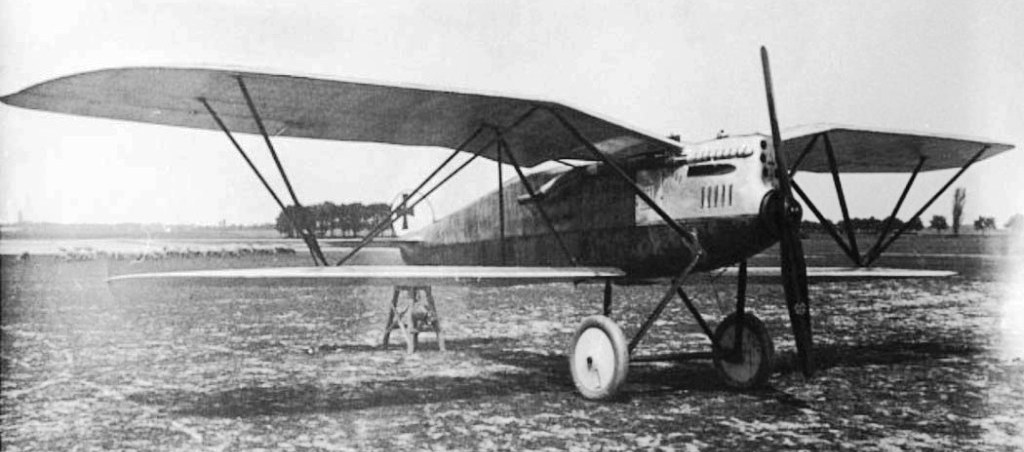
- Oblique view of the Aviatik C.V

General information
- Type: Reconnaissance aircraft
- National origin: German Empire
- Manufacturer: Aviatik
- Number built: 1

History
- Developed into: Aviatik C.VI

The Aviatik C.V was an experimental reconnaissance biplane with a distinctive gull upper wing built by Automobil und Aviatik AG for the Imperial German Army's (Deutsches Heer) Imperial German Air Service (Luftstreitkräfte) during the First World War. The single prototype was built in 1917.

It was listed in front-line service in June 1917, but this may have been a clerical error.

== Specifications ==
Data from Aviatik Aircraft of WWI: A Centennial Perspective on Great War Airplane

General characteristics

- Crew: 2
- Powerplant: 1 × Argus As.III water-cooled straight-six engine, 130 kW (180 hp)
- Propellers: 2-bladed fixed-pitch

Armament
1 × fixed, forward-firing 7.92-millimeter (0.312 in) LMG 08/15 machine gun
1 × 7.92 mm Parabellum MG14 machine gun on a flexible mount for the observer

== Bibliography ==
- Gray, Peter & Thetford, Owen (1987) [1970]. German Aircraft of the First World War (2nd ed.). Putnam. ISBN 0-85177-809-7.
- Herris, Jack (2023). Aviatik Aircraft of WWI: A Centennial Perspective on Great War Airplanes. Great War Aviation Centennial Series. Vol. 10 (2nd ed.). Aeronaut Books. ISBN 978-1-953201-59-1.
