= Albatros W.8 =

W.8
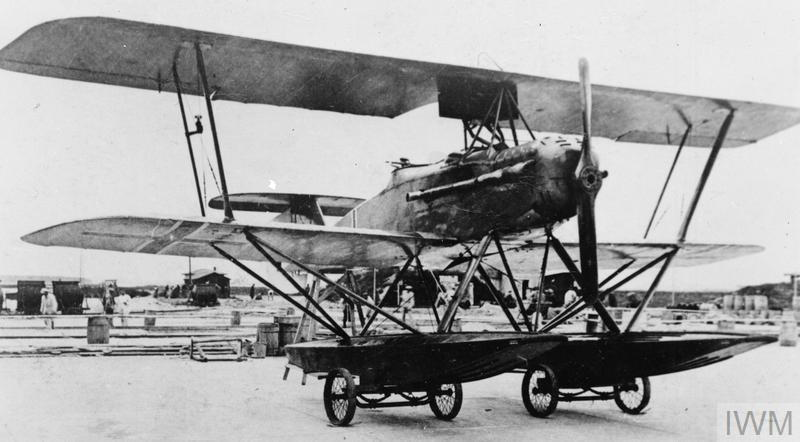
- An Albatros W.8 floatplane on its beaching gear

General information
- Type: Biplane fighter seaplane
- National origin: Germany
- Manufacturer: Albatros Flugzeugwerke
- Number built: 3

History
- First flight: 1918

The Albatros W.8 was a German biplane fighter floatplane that saw service during First World War. It patrolled the seas around 1918. The fuselage of the aircraft was made of wood, similar to most aircraft designs of that period. The W.8 had a water-cooled Benz Bz.IIIb eight-cylinder engine fitted with a fixed two-bladed wooden propeller.

== Specifications (W.8) ==
General characteristics

- Crew: two
- Length: 9.95 m (32 ft 8 in)
- Wingspan: 11.46 m (37 ft 7 in)
- Height: 3.39 m (11 ft 1 in)
- Powerplant: 1 × Benz Bz.IIIb Water-cooled 8-cylinder engine, 138 kW (185 hp)

Performance

- Maximum speed: 150 km/h (93 mph, 81 kn)
- Range: 500 km (310 mi, 270 nmi)
- Endurance: 3.5 hours
- Rate of climb: 2.5 m/s (490 ft/min)

Armament

- Guns: 1 x light machine gun fixed forward, 1 x light machine gun in a flexible rear-mount

== Bibliography ==
- Herris, Jack (2017). Albatros Aircraft of WWI: A Centennial Perspective on Great War Airplanes: Volume 3: Bombers, Seaplanes, J-Types. Great War Aviation Centennial Series. Vol. 26. Charleston, South Carolina: Aeronaut Books. ISBN 978-1-935881-49-0.
- Herris, Jack (2012). German Seaplane Fighters of WWI: A Centennial Perspective on Great War Seaplanes. Great War Aviation Centennial Series. Vol. 2. Charleston (S.C.): Aeronaut Books. ISBN 978-1-935881-09-4.
