= AEG PE =

PE
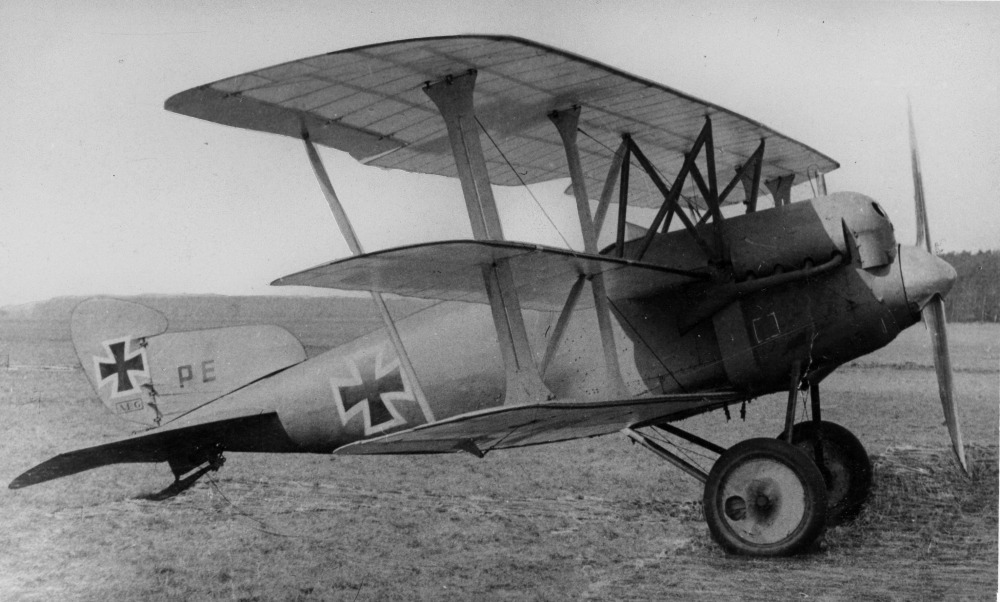

General information
- Type: Fighter
- National origin: German Empire
- Manufacturer: AEG
- Number built: 1

History
- First flight: 1917
- Variants: AEG DJ.I

The AEG PE (factory designation Panzer Einsitzer – "armoured one-seater") was a prototype triplane fighter built by the Allgemeine Elektricitäts-Gesellschaft (AEG) during the First World War for the Imperial German Army's (Deutsches Heer) Imperial German Air Service (Luftstreitkräfte). It was intended to attack enemy ground-attack aircraft at low level within range of anti-aircraft defenses. The aircraft began flight testing in late 1917, but it was rejected on the grounds of poor flight characteristics.

== Development ==
Documentation on the PE is lacking, but aviation historian Jack Herris believes that it was inspired by the head of the Inspectorate of Flying Troops (Inspektion der Fliegertruppen (Idflieg), Lieutenant-Colonel (Oberstleutnant) Wilhelm Siegert, who believed in "specialized aircraft to fulfill specific roles". The aircraft was an armored fighter designed to attack enemy aircraft at low level and needed to be able survive hits by anti-aircraft guns. To this purpose the PE's fuselage had integral armor that protected the pilot, the engine and the fuel tank. The rear portion of the fuselage was built from aluminium while the two-bay wing structure was constructed from the company's usual steel-tube spars. The aircraft used a water-cooled 195-horsepower (145 kW) Benz Bz.IIIb V8 engine. It was armed with a pair of forward-firing 7.92 mm (0.312 in) LMG 08/15 machine guns and could carry four small bombs.

A document dated 21 October 1917 states that AEG was developing an armored fighter with the factory designation of PE. Another document states that the flying trials were expected to be completed in December. In March 1918 the aircraft reached a height of 4,000 m (13,000 ft) in 48 minutes and the test pilot reported that it was easy to fly, but not fast. Idflieg ordered that work on the PE should be canceled two months later because of "poor flight characteristics". AEG used the same fuselage design in its DJ.I biplane.

== Specifications (AEG PE) ==
Data from German Aircraft of the First World War; A.E.G. Aircraft of WWI: A Centennial Perspective on Great War Airplanes

General characteristics

- Crew: 1
- Length: 6.6 m (21 ft 8 in)
- Upper wingspan: 11.2 m (36 ft 9 in)
- Mid wingspan: 10.6 m (34 ft 9 in)
- Lower wingspan: 10 m (32 ft 10 in)
- Wing area: 31.3 m^{2} (337 sq ft)
- Empty weight: 1,182 kg (2,606 lb)
- Gross weight: 1,412 kg (3,113 lb)
- Powerplant: 1 × Benz Bz.IIIb water-cooled V8 engine, 145 kW (195 hp)
- Propellers: 2-bladed

Performance

- Maximum speed: 166 km/h (103 mph, 90 kn)
- Time to altitude: 5.8 minutes to 1,000 m (3,300 ft)
- 48 minutes to 4,000 m (13,000 ft)

Armament

- Guns: * 2 × 7.92 mm (.312 in) LMG 08/15 machine guns
- Bombs: * 4 x small bombs

== See also ==
Aircraft of comparable role, configuration, and era

- Sopwith Salamander

Related lists

- List of military aircraft of Germany

== Bibliography ==
- Gray, Peter & Thetford, Owen (1987) [1970]. German Aircraft of the First World War (2nd ed.). London: Putnam. ISBN 0-85177-809-7.
- Herris, Jack (2015). A.E.G. Aircraft of WWI: A Centennial Perspective on Great War Airplanes. Great War Aviation Centennial Series. Vol. 16. n. p.: Aeronaut Books. ISBN 978-1-935881-28-5.
