= Short Type 184 =

British World War I seaplane

Type 184
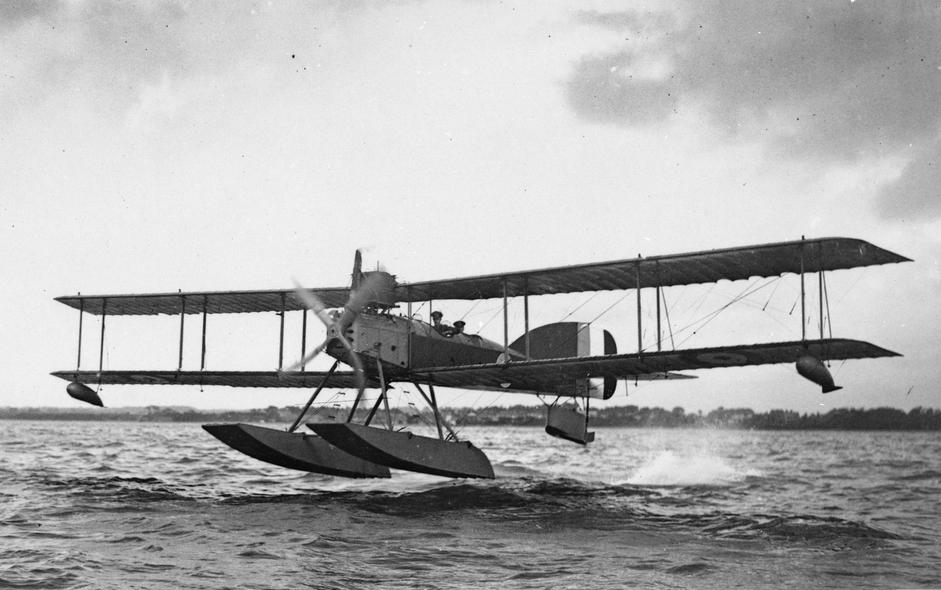

General information
- Type: Reconnaissance aircraft / Torpedo bomber
- Manufacturer: Short Brothers
- Designer: Horace Short
- Primary users: Royal Naval Air Service Royal Flying Corps; Hellenic Navy; Estonian Air Force
- Number built: 936

History
- Introduction date: 1915
- First flight: 1915
- Retired: 1933 (Estonia)
- Variants: Mann Egerton Type B, Short Bomber

The Short Admiralty Type 184, often called the Short 225 after the power rating of the engine first fitted, was a British two-seat reconnaissance, bombing and torpedo carrying folding-wing seaplane designed by Horace Short of Short Brothers. It was first flown in 1915 and remained in service until after the armistice in 1918. A Short 184 was the first aircraft to sink a ship using a torpedo, and another was the only British aircraft to take part in the Battle of Jutland.

== Design and development ==
Torpedo-dropping trials had been undertaken using a 160 hp (120 kW) Gnome powered Short Admiralty Type 166 but this had proved insufficiently powerful, and so in September 1914 a new specification was formulated for an aircraft to be powered by the 225 hp (168 kW) Sunbeam Mohawk engine currently being developed. Design proposals were invited from Sopwith, J. Samuel White and Short Brothers. Horace Short's response when the requirements were explained him by Murray Sueter, the director of the naval air department, was to say "Well, if you particularly want this done, I will produce a seaplane that will satisfy you", and on the strength of this assurance two prototypes were ordered, for which serial nos. 184 and 185 were reserved, the resultant type so becoming the Type 184.

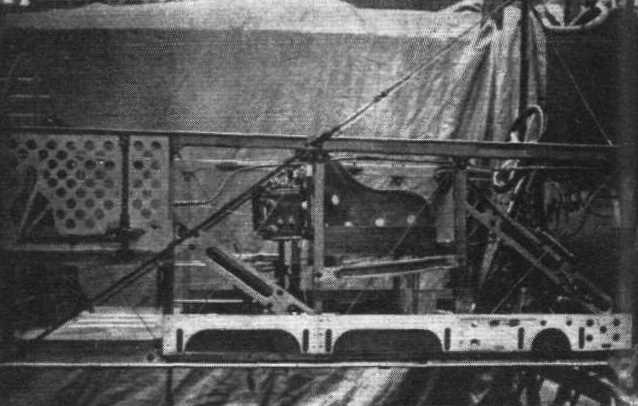
Cockpit section of fuselage.

Similar in basic design to earlier Short floatplanes built for the Navy, the Type 184 was an equal-span three-bay tractor configuration biplane. The fuselage was a conventional wire-braced wooden box-girder, with spruce longerons spindled out to reduce weight and fittings of manganese steel. The top surface of the fuselage was faired to a semi-circular section. The engine was mounted on bearers fixed to pressed steel transverse frames mounted between the longerons and the large rectangular radiator was mounted above and behind the engine, directly in front of the upper wing.

The lower wings were parallel-chord, while the upper wings increased in chord from the centre section to the wingtips. The two prototype aircraft had ailerons on the upper wing only. These were single-acting, relying on the airflow to maintain them in a neutral position unless pulled downwards by using the flight controls. The interplane struts were steel tubing with wood fairings to produce a streamline section. The wings could be swung out from the pilot's position, by means of a hand-winch in the cockpit, locking being accomplished by means of a splined and threaded spigot in the forward spar, locked and unlocked by a quarter-turn in a similar manner to the breech of a field-gun. In the folded position the wings were supported by a transverse shaft mounted in front of the tailplane: this was rotated by a lever in the cockpit so that its upturned ends engaged with slots on the interplane struts in order to lock the wings in the folded position.

The twin unstepped main floats were carried by a two struts attached to the front cross-tube and two pairs of struts attached to the rear cross-tube, both cross-tubes being arched in the middle to accommodate the torpedo crutches. The wooden tail float incorporated a small water-rudder actuated by torque tubes connected to the main rudder, and cylindrical air-bags were fitted beneath the lower wing-tips.

The aircraft was fitted with a radio transmitter and receiver, which was powered by a wind-driven generator mounted on a hinged arm so that it could be folded back when not being used, and other equipment carried included a basket of carrier pigeons, intended to be used as a back-up for the radio in the event of forced landings.

Initial trials revealed a lack of longitudinal control, and the single-acting ailerons caused problems when taxying downwind, so the two prototypes were fitted with lengths of bungee cord attached to control horns on the upper aileron surface to return the aileron to the neutral position. This only produced a marginal improvement, so ailerons were then added to the lower wings, these being fitted to all the aircraft built apart from the two prototypes. These were linked by cables to the upper ailerons, and the bungee cord to return the ailerons was rigged between the top of the rear interplane struts and the lower ailerons.

== Operational history ==
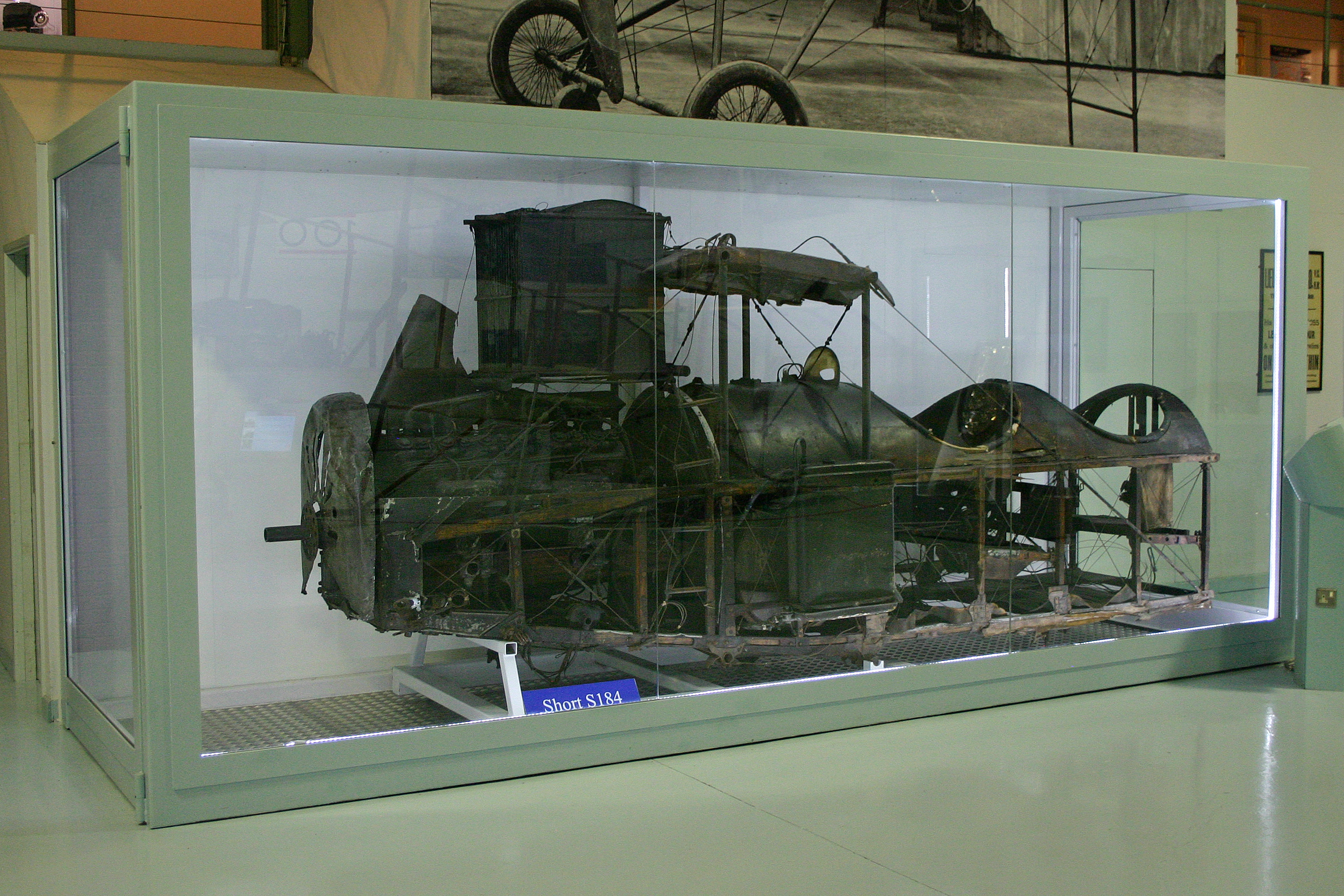
Remains of a Short Type 184 at the Fleet Air Arm Museum. While Frederick Rutland's aeroplane survived the First World War intact, it was damaged by bombing during the Second World War.

The first aircraft flew in early 1915. An order for ten more aircraft had already been placed, and 936 aircraft were built by ten different British aircraft companies, making it the most successful of Shorts' pre-World War II aircraft.

The two prototype aircraft were embarked upon HMS Ben-my-Chree, which sailed for the Aegean on 21 March 1915 to take part in the Gallipoli campaign. On 12 August 1915 one of these, piloted by Flight Commander Charles Edmonds, was the first aircraft in the world to attack an enemy ship with an air-launched torpedo. However, the ship had already been crippled by a torpedo fired by the British submarine E14.

However, on 17 August 1915, another Turkish ship was sunk by a torpedo of whose origin there was no doubt. On this occasion Flight Commander Edmonds torpedoed a Turkish transport ship a few miles north of the Dardanelles. His formation colleague, Flt Lt George Dacre, was forced to land on the water owing to engine trouble but, seeing an enemy tug close by, taxied up to it and released his torpedo, sinking the tug. Without the weight of the torpedo Dacre was able to take off and return to the Ben-My-Chree.

The performance of the Type 184 in the climatic conditions of the Mediterranean was marginal, it being necessary to fly without an observer and carry a limited amount of fuel, and the 184 was therefore used either as a bomber, carrying two 112 lb bombs, or for reconnaissance and gunnery observation.

A Short 184, aircraft number 8359, was the only British aircraft to take part in the Battle of Jutland. Flown by Flt Lt Frederick Rutland (who became known afterwards as "Rutland of Jutland") with Assistant Paymaster G. S. Trewin as observer, the aircraft was launched from HMS Engadine at about 3.08 p.m.: flying at about 90 ft (27 m) due to low visibility, they spotted four cruisers of the German fleet, reporting their presence back to the Engadine at about 3.30. The aircraft was presented to the Imperial War Museum in 1917, where it was damaged in a German air raid during the Blitz. The unrestored forward section of the fuselage is currently on loan from IWM to Fleet Air Arm Museum where it is on public display.

The aircraft served in most theatres of the war. Five were used in Mesopotamia, where they were flown from the River Tigris at Ora, and in April 1916 they were used to drop supplies to the besieged garrison at Kut al Amara.

The principal use of the 184 was its use in anti-submarine patrol work. Although a substantial number of submarines were spotted and attacked, no confirmed sinkings were made.

The type was used for a number of experiments by the Port Victoria Marine Experimental Aircraft Depot. On 9 May 1916, a Short 184 seaplane, using a bombsight developed by Bourdillon and Tizard, hit a target with a 500-pound bomb from a height of 4,000 feet. The 184 was also used for trials of the Davis gun in April 1916

The Type 184 was still in production at the end of the war, and in December 1918 315 remained in service. After the end of the war they were mainly used for spotting mines, and remained in service at least until the end of 1920. Following the Geddes Report all were struck off charge by the end of 1922.

Post-war, five aircraft were adapted to seat four passengers and used for pleasure flights: two being used by the Eastbourne Aviation Co., two by the Seaplane and Pleasure Trip Co., and one by Manchester Airways.

In 2010, the Estonian Maritime Museum announced it had ordered a non-flying reproduction of the plane to be built for fitting into one of their historic seaplane hangars. The main designer was killed in a glider crash on 11 July of the same year. However, a group of enthusiasts took over the build and the reproduction project was completed in spring 2012. The replica is now displayed in collection of the museum and can be seen at the Seaplane Harbour in Tallinn.

A single example of the Short Type 184 was acquired by the Imperial Japanese Navy and re-designated Yokosuka Navy Short Reconnaissance Seaplane, being used as an engine test-bed.

=== Manufacturers ===
1. Brush Electrical Engineering Co. Ltd. (190)
2. Frederick Sage & Co. Ltd. (72)
3. J. Samuel White (110)
4. Mann, Egerton & Co. Ltd. (22)
5. Phoenix Dynamo Manufacturing Company (62)
6. Robey & Co. Ltd. (256)
7. S E Saunders Limited (80)
8. Short Brothers, Rochester (117)
9. Supermarine Aviation Works Ltd. (15)
10. Westland Aircraft Works Ltd. (12)

== Variants ==
The Short 184 was later fitted with a variety of different engines, including the 240 hp (180 kW) Sunbeam Gurkha, the 260 hp (190 kW) Sunbeam Maori and the 240 hp (180 kW) Renault 12F.

- One example, known as the Short Cut was modified by Commander C.R. Samson. The span of the lower wing was reduced, the wingtip floats were replaced with deflecting boards, and the fin area was reduced. Samson claimed an extra six knots airspeed and a significant increase in rate of climb. This aircraft may have been the inspiration behind the Mann Egerton Type B.
- Type D A conversion into a single-seat bomber, with the pilot's position moved to the rear cockpit, the space previously used for the front cockpit being used to stow nine 65 lb bombs.
- Dover Type 184 Used by the Dover Patrol seaplane stations at Newhaven and Cherbourg, equipped with larger main floats and modified wing-tip floats to cope with rough sea conditions.
- A landplane development of the Short 184, the Short Bomber, was also used by the RFC and the RNAS.

== Operators ==
Canada

- Royal Canadian Naval Air Service

Chile

- Chilean Air Force
- Chilean Navy operated six aircraft 1919–1933

Estonia

- Estonian Air Force operated 8 aircraft 1919–33

France

- French Navy

Greece

- Hellenic Navy

Japan

- Imperial Japanese Navy

Netherlands

- Dutch Naval Aviation Service

United Kingdom

- Royal Naval Air Service

- Newhaven Seaplane Base

- Royal Flying Corps
- Royal Air Force

- No. 202 Squadron RAF (1920–1921)
- No. 219 Squadron RAF (1918–1920)
- No. 229 Squadron RAF (1918–1919)
- No. 230 Squadron RAF (1918–1919)
- No. 233 Squadron RAF (1918–1919)
- No. 234 Squadron RAF (1918–1919)
- No. 235 Squadron RAF (1918–1919)
- No. 237 Squadron RAF (1918–1919)
- No. 238 Squadron RAF (1918–1919)
- No. 239 Squadron RAF (1918–1919)
- No. 240 Squadron RAF (1918–1919)
- No. 241 Squadron RAF (1918–1919)
- No. 242 Squadron RAF (1918–1919)
- No. 243 Squadron RAF (1918–1919)
- No. 245 Squadron RAF (1918–1919)
- No. 246 Squadron RAF (1918–1919)
- No. 248 Squadron RAF (1918–1919)
- No. 249 Squadron RAF (1918–1919)
- No. 252 Squadron RAF (1918–1919)
- No. 253 Squadron RAF (1918–1919)
- No. 263 Squadron RAF (1918–1919)
- No. 264 Squadron RAF (1918–1919)
- No. 265 Squadron RAF (1918–1919)
- No. 266 Squadron RAF (1918–1919)
- No. 267 Squadron RAF (1918–1921)
- No. 268 Squadron RAF (1918–1919)
- No. 269 Squadron RAF (1918–1919)
- No. 270 Squadron RAF (1919–1919)
- No. 271 Squadron RAF (1918–1918)

== Specifications (Improved 184) ==
Data from British Aeroplanes 1914–18

General characteristics

- Crew: Two
- Length: 40 ft 7 1/2 in (12.383 m)
- Wingspan: 63 ft 6 1/4 in (19.361 m)
- Height: 13 ft 6 in (4.11 m)
- Wing area: 688 sq ft (63.9 m^{2})
- Empty weight: 3,703 lb (1,680 kg)
- Gross weight: 5,363 lb (2,433 kg)
- Powerplant: 1 × Sunbeam , 260 hp (190 kW)

Performance

- Maximum speed: 88.5 mph (142.4 km/h, 76.9 kn) at 2,000 ft (610 m)
- Endurance: 2 3/4 hr
- Service ceiling: 9,000 ft (2,700 m)
- Time to altitude:
  - 8 min 35 s to 2,000 ft (610 m)
  - 33 min 50 s to 6,500 ft (2,000 m)

Armament

- Guns: 1 × .303 in (7.7 mm) Lewis Gun in rear cockpit
- Bombs: 1 × 14 in (356 mm) torpedo or up to 520 lb (236 kg) of bombs

== See also ==
- Sempill Mission

Related development

- Mann Egerton Type B
- Short Bomber

Aircraft of comparable role, configuration, and era

- Wight Converted Seaplane

Related lists

- List of aircraft of the Fleet Air Arm
- List of aircraft of the Royal Air Force
