= AEG DJ.I =

German biplane fighter

DJ.I

General information
- Type: Armoured fighter
- National origin: German Empire
- Manufacturer: AEG
- Number built: 2

History
- First flight: August 1918
- Developed from: AEG PE triplane

The AEG DJ.I was a prototype biplane fighter that was built by the Allgemeine Elektricitäts-Gesellschaft (AEG) during the First World War for the Imperial German Army's (Deutsches Heer) Imperial German Air Service (Luftstreitkräfte). It was derived from the unsuccessful AEG PE triplane fighter and shared the same armoured fuselage design, armament and engine. Three prototypes were ordered, but only two are known to have been completed before end of the war in November 1918.

== Development ==
AEG was encouraged to design a single-seat fighter to attack enemy ground-attack aircraft in 1917, knowing that it had to be armoured itself since it was going to be flying at the same very low altitudes as its intended prey. Its PE prototype had been rejected by the Inspectorate of Flying Troops (Inspektion der Fliegertruppen (Idflieg) for poor flying characteristics, but AEG thought that a biplane version should improve its performance since the elimination of a wing should reduce drag and improve speed. The company reused the design for the fuselage with its integral armour for the pilot, engine and fuel tank, but designed new two-bay wings that replaced the bracing wires with wide I-shaped interplane struts to reduce its vulnerability to anti-aircraft fire. An experimental water-cooled 195-horsepower (145 kW) Benz Bz.IIIb V8 engine was used in the first prototype and a water-cooled 245 hp (183 kW) Maybach Mb.IVa straight-six engine in the second one. Both aircraft were armed with a pair of 7.92-millimetre (0.312 in) leMG 08/15 machine guns and four small bombs.

Construction of the first prototype began in March 1918 and was completed two months later although Idflieg's flight testing did not begin until August. The reason for the delay is unknown, but it may have been related to the availability of the Benz engine. The second prototype was under construction from May to July and surviving documentation states that its Maybach engine needed replacement in September, possibly because it was being flight tested. A third prototype is known to be under construction in that same month, but nothing else is known about it. No decision had been made about production before the end of the war in November.

== Specifications (AEG DJ.I) ==
Data from German Aircraft of the First World War; A.E.G. Aircraft of WWI: A Centennial Perspective on Great War Airplanes

General characteristics

- Crew: 1
- Length: 6.9 m (22 ft 8 in)
- Upper wingspan: 10 m (32 ft 10 in)
- Lower wingspan: 9.9 m (32 ft 6 in)
- Wing area: 30.5 m^{2} (328 sq ft)
- Empty weight: 1,185 kg (2,612 lb)
- Gross weight: 1,375 kg (3,031 lb)
- Powerplant: 1 × Benz Bz.IIIb V-8 water-cooled piston engine, 145 kW (195 hp)
- Propellers: 4-bladed

Performance

- Maximum speed: 180 km/h (110 mph, 97 kn)
- Rate of climb: 4.2 m/s (830 ft/min)
- Time to altitude: 4 minutes to 1,000 m (3,300 ft)

Armament

- Guns: 2 × forward-firing 7.92 mm (.312 in) LMG 08/15 Spandau machine guns
- Bombs: 4 × small bombs

== See also ==
Aircraft of comparable role, configuration, and era

- Sopwith Salamander

Related lists

- List of military aircraft of Germany

== Bibliography ==
- Gray, Peter & Thetford, Owen (1987) [1970]. German Aircraft of the First World War (2nd ed.). London: Putnam. ISBN 0-85177-809-7.
- Herris, Jack (2015). A.E.G. Aircraft of WWI: A Centennial Perspective on Great War Airplanes. Great War Aviation Centennial Series. Vol. 16. n. p.: Aeronaut Books. ISBN 978-1-935881-28-5.
