= Mann Egerton Type H =

Type H

General information
- Type: Shipboard fighter
- National origin: United Kingdom
- Manufacturer: Mann Egerton
- Designer: J W Carr
- Number built: 2

History
- First flight: Autumn 1917

The Mann Egerton Type H, also known as the Mann Egerton H.2, was a British ship-borne fighter aircraft of the 1910s.

== Development ==
The Type H was the first original design by Mann Egerton, and was designed by J W Carr to Air Ministry specification N.1a in 1916. Its 2-bay biplane wings could be folded manually (a feature first introduced in 1913 on the Short Folder), due to its intended use as a naval fighter. Other features were the use of flotation chambers and a float attached to the underside of the fuselage for extra buoyancy. An innovation was that the undercarriage could be jettisoned if the aircraft needed to land on water. However, in autumn 1917, the aircraft failed flotation tests, and a new aircraft prototype, the Type H Mk I with single bay wings was drawn up.

The Mark II version had inflatable flotation bags in place of the large float on the Mk I, a more conventional undercarriage and a horn-balanced rudder. This aircraft was tested in December 1917, however it was deemed as unfit for use in the Fleet Air Arm and further development was discontinued.

== Specifications (Type H Mk II) ==
Data from British Aeroplanes 1914–18

General characteristics

- Crew: 1
- Length: 21 ft 11 in (6.68 m)
- Wingspan: 30 ft 9 in (9.37 m)
- Height: 8 ft 11.5 in (2.73 m)
- Wing area: 310 sq ft (28.80 m^{2})
- Empty weight: 1,760 lb (798 kg)
- Gross weight: 2,326 lb (1,055 kg)
- Powerplant: 1 × Hispano-Suiza 8Bd eight-cylinder water-cooled engine , 200 hp (149 kW)

Performance

- Maximum speed: 113 mph (182 km/h, 98 kn)
- Endurance: 3 hours 15 minutes
- Service ceiling: 16,800 ft (5,120 m)
- Rate of climb: 1,013 ft/min (5.1 m/s)

Armament

- 1 x .303 Vickers gun mounted to port on the fuselage
- 1 x .303 Lewis gun mounted above the wing centre section
