= Mann Egerton =

Automotive and aerospace company based in Norwich, England

Mann, Egerton & Company Ltd.
- Founded: 1905; 121 years ago
- Defunct: 1986; 40 years ago
- Fate: Broken Up (car dealerships acquired by Inchcape plc, in 1973)
- Headquarters: Norwich, United Kingdom

Mann, Egerton & Company Ltd. was an automotive and aerospace company which was headquartered in Norwich, United Kingdom. During its history the company was variously active in automotive retailing, aircraft manufacturing, automotive coachbuilding, and electrical services.

It was formally founded in 1905 by Gerald Mann, an electrical engineer and Hubert Egerton, although the two had been working in partnership for a number of preceding years (the logo “Tern” used in the 1960s was often accompanied by the statement “ESTD. 1898”). Besides car dealing the company continued electrical installation work.

== History ==
The company supplied its first custom built car body in 1909 for a Rolls-Royce chassis. By 1913, it had branches across East Anglia and in London.

Starting in 1915, the company was required to build aeroplanes for the national war effort. Most of the aircraft were built under licence, including 22 Short Admiralty Type 184s and 20 Short Bombers. Towards the end of the conflict the firm built 100 SPAD S.VII French designed fighters. The company also produced ten examples of its own Type B the further development of the Short Type 184.

In the Second World War they built vehicle bodies for the Government, especially the ambulance Austin K2/Y.

The headquarters were in Prince of Wales Road Norwich where they had one dealership of British Leyland. The garage in Surrey Street, Norwich had one dealership of Ford and commercial vehicles and the woodworking business were run from premises on Cromer Road, Norwich. Over the years garages in several other towns were opened or acquired, including Central London where they sold cars of Rolls-Royce and Bentley, Finchley, Lowestoft, Uttoxeter, Leicester, Nottingham (formerly Atkeys), Derby and Worcester.

The electrical department was sold to the Westinghouse Brake and Signal Company in 1964. Mann Egerton was acquired by Inchcape plc in September 1973, although its woodworking business continued until it was bought out by the management in 1986. The woodworking business made school furniture. The vehicles made by the coachbuilding business included refrigerated vehicles for companies such as Findus and Birds Eye. The business was sold to Bonallack Coachbuilders.

=== Aircraft Manufacture ===
- Short Type 184 (22 Aircraft)
- Short Bomber (20 Aircraft)
- SPAD S.VII (100 Aircraft)
- Mann Egerton Type B (1916)
- Mann Egerton Type H (1917)

== See also ==
- Aerospace industry in the United Kingdom
- Automotive industry in the United Kingdom
