= Albatros Dr.II =

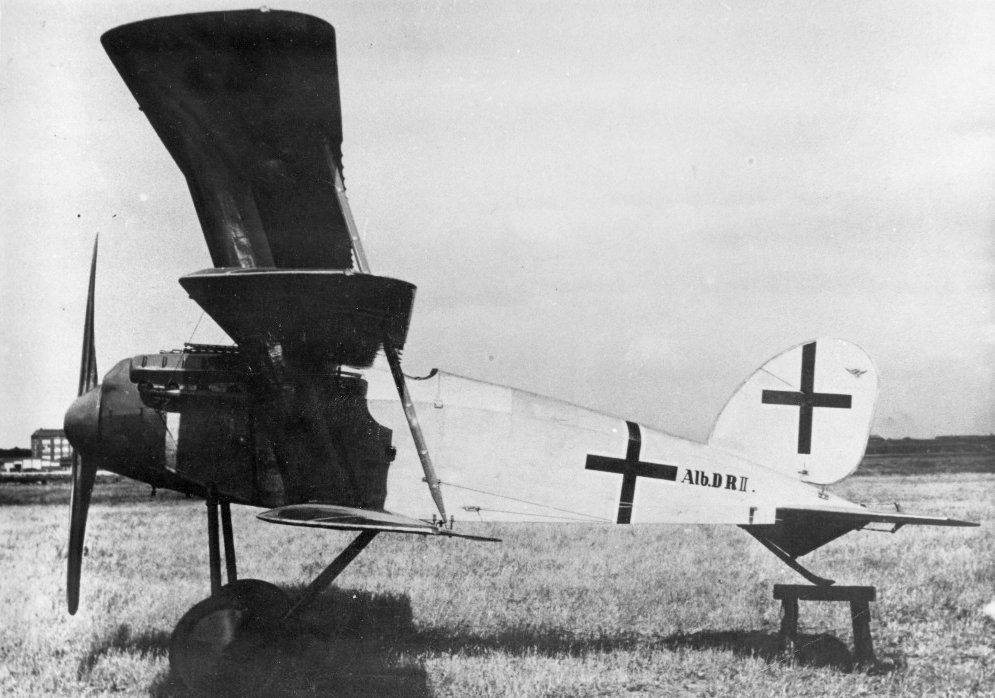

General information
- Type: Fighter
- Manufacturer: Albatros Flugzeugwerke
- Primary user: Luftstreitkräfte

The Albatros Dr.II was a German prototype single-seat fighter triplane, the sole example of which flew in the spring of 1918. It was similar in many respects to the D.X biplane, employing among other features the same 145 kW (195 hp) Benz Bz.IIIbo engine and twin 7.92 mm (.312 in) machine guns.

The three pairs of wings were sharply staggered, braced by broad I-struts, and shared parallel chords. All three pairs were equipped with ailerons, which were linked by hinged struts.

== Specifications (Dr.II) ==
Data from German Aircraft of the First World War

General characteristics

- Crew: 1
- Length: 6.18 m (20 ft 3 in)
- Wingspan: 10 m (32 ft 10 in)
- Height: 3.34 m (10 ft 11 in)
- Wing area: 26.6 m^{2} (286 sq ft)
- Empty weight: 676 kg (1,490 lb)
- Gross weight: 915 kg (2,017 lb)
- Powerplant: 1 × Benz Bz.IIIbo V-8 water-cooled piston engine, 145 kW (194 hp)
- Propellers: 2-bladed fixed-pitch propeller

Performance

- Wing loading: 25.4 kg/m^{2} (5.2 lb/sq ft)
- Power/mass: 0.16 kW/kg (0.097 hp/lb)
