= Aviatik D.III =

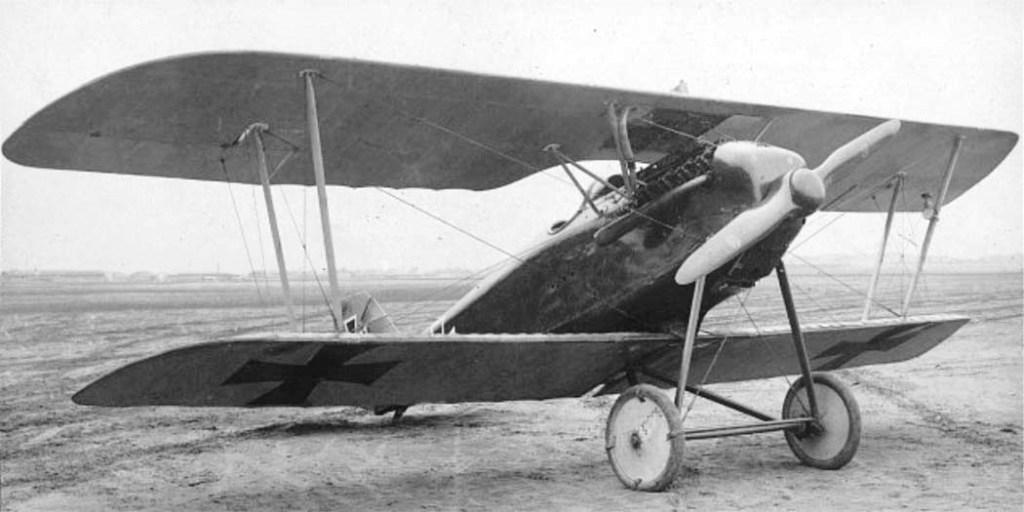
- Oblique view of the Aviatik D.III

General information
- Type: Experimental fighter
- National origin: German
- Manufacturer: Aviatik
- Number built: 21?

History
- First flight: November 1917
- Developed into: Aviatik D.IV

The Aviatik D.III was an experimental single-seater fighter plane built by Automobil und Aviatik AG for the Imperial German Army's (Deutsches Heer) Imperial German Air Service (Luftstreitkräfte) during the First World War. Two aircraft were delivered in 1917, but they may have been primarily intended as engine testbeds. Low-rate production continued after the end of the war in November 1918 for service with the postwar Air Force (Inspektion der Fliegertruppen) and Air Police (Polizei-Fliegertruppe). The D.III became the basis for the Aviatik D.IV.

== Design and development ==
In November 1917, the plane was first flown, using a water-cooled, 195-metric-horsepower (143 kW) Benz Bz.IIIbo V-eight piston engine. It was armed with two LMG 08/15 machine guns. After testing at Adlershof from February 9–12, 1918, the plane underwent modifications, as requested by the Imperial German Air Service's Inspectorate of Flying Troops (Inspektion der Fliegertruppen). In April, a second prototype made its first flight, powered by a geared Benz Bz.IIIbm, although several D.IIIs powered by the original Bz.IIIbo engine were already under production.

A single D.III airframe was modified to accommodate a geared Bz.IIIbv engine that displaced more than the earlier Bz.IIIbo and Bz.IIIbm models, but produced the same amount of power as the D.IV.

== Operational history ==
Eight D.IIIs were reported in the Air Police inventory in January 1920. In March 1920 Aviatik reported to the Inter-Allied Aeronautical Commission of Control that it had eleven partially completed D.IIIs on hand. The following month the Germans reported that four D.IIIs were serving with the successor to the Imperial German Air Service, the Inspektion der Fliegertruppen, and eight more were assigned to the Air Police.

== Specifications (1st prototype) ==
Data from The Complete Book of Fighters: An Illustrated Encyclopedia of Every Fighter Built and Flown; German Aircraft of the First World War

General characteristics

- Crew: 1
- Length: 8.47 m (27 ft 9 in)
- Wingspan: 9 m (29 ft 6 in)
- Height: 3.08 m (10 ft 1 in)
- Wing area: 21 m^{2} (230 sq ft)
- Gross weight: 864 kg (1,905 lb)
- Powerplant: 1 × Benz Bz IIIbo water-cooled V-eight piston engine, 145 kW (195 hp)
- Propellers: 2-bladed fixed-pitch

Performance

- Range: 720 km (450 mi, 390 nmi)
- Rate of climb: 0.11 m/s (22 ft/min)

Armament

- Guns: 2 × fixed, synchronized 7.92 mm (0.312 in) LMG 08/15 machine guns in the forward fuselage

== Bibliography ==
- Andersson, Lennart & Sanger, Ray (2014). Retribution and Recovery: German Aircraft and Aviation 1919 to 1922. Air-Britain (Historians). ISBN 978-0-85130-467-0.
- Gray, Peter & Thetford, Owen (1987) [1970]. German Aircraft of the First World War (2nd ed.). Putnam. ISBN 0-85177-809-7.
- Green, William & Swanborough, Gordon (2001) [1994]. The Complete Book of Fighters: An Illustrated Encyclopedia of Every Fighter Built and Flown (Revised and Updated ed.). Salamander Books. ISBN 1-84065-269-1.
- Herris, Jack (2023). Aviatik Aircraft of WWI: A Centennial Perspective on Great War Airplanes. Great War Aviation Centennial Series. Vol. 10 (2nd ed.). Aeronaut Books. ISBN 978-1-953201-59-1.
