= Siemens-Schuckert B =

B

General information
- Type: Reconnaissance aircraft
- National origin: Germany
- Manufacturer: Siemens-Schuckert
- Designer: Steffen
- Number built: 1

History
- First flight: 1915

The Siemens-Schuckert B was an unarmed German two seat reconnaissance biplane built early in World War I. A single example was delivered but soon lost.

== Design and development ==
The two seat unarmed B was built in 1915 for reconnaissance duties. It was an equal span, two bay biplane, with straight edged, constant chord wings mounted without stagger. Unusually, the wing spars were made from tubular steel. The wings had parallel pairs of interplane struts, the inner ones with additional diagonal strut cross bracing, and bays laterally conventionally braced with diagonal flying wires. The lower wing was joined to the lower fuselage longerons and the upper wing supported over the fuselage on a pair of outward leaning N-form struts from the upper fuselage; a fully semi-circular cut-out in the upper trailing edge improved the pilot's upward vision.

The B was powered by a 110 hp (82 kW) Siemens-Halske Sh.I nine cylinder rotary engine, driving a two blade propeller and housed within a partially enclosing, oil deflecting cowling. Behind it the fuselage was flat sided. The aircraft had a conventional undercarriage with mainwheels on a single axle supported on V-form struts.

The sole B built was delivered to the communications centre at Ostend. After it crashed, some parts were retrieved and used by Siemens-Schuckert in the construction of the E.II monoplane.

== Specifications (before reconstruction) ==
Data from German Aircraft of World War I

General characteristics

- Crew: Two
- Length: 6.2 m (20 ft 4 in)
- Wingspan: 12.4 m (40 ft 8 in)
- Wing area: 18.10 m^{2} (194.8 sq ft)
- Empty weight: 510 kg (1,124 lb)
- Gross weight: 695 kg (1,532 lb)
- Powerplant: 1 × Siemens-Halske Sh.I 9-cylinder rotary, 82 kW (110 hp)
- Propellers: 2-bladed

Performance

- Maximum speed: 153 km/h (95 mph, 83 kn)
