= Aviatik D.IV =

Prototype German fighter plane of 1918

D.IV

General information
- Type: Fighter
- National origin: Germany
- Manufacturer: Aviatik
- Number built: 1

History
- First flight: 1918
- Developed from: Aviatik D.III

The Aviatik D.IV was a prototype single-seat, biplane fighter built by Automobil und Aviatik AG for the Imperial German Army's (Deutsches Heer) Imperial German Air Service (Luftstreitkräfte) during the First World War. One aircraft was built and it was a contender at the Second Fighter Competition held in May—June 1918, together with the Aviatik D.III from which it was developed, but it was not selected for production.

== Design ==
Like the D.III, the forward fuselage of the D.IV was built from steel tubing covered with plywood and the single-bay wooden wings were covered with doped fabric. The lower wing was mounted on a keel that protruded from the fuselage to ensure that the gap between the wings was large enough to avoid airflow interference. Its layout was conventional, with the pilot's cockpit beneath the trailing edge of the upper wing; there was a semi-circular cutout in the upper wing above the cockpit to improve the pilot's view above the aircraft. A piston engine in the nose drove a four-bladed propeller. The radiator was faired into the upper wing.

The choice of powerplant was the major departure from the D.III, using the 195-metric-horsepower (143 kW) Benz Bz.IIIbv geared V-eight engine. This was a larger displacement and more powerful version of the two Bz.III subtypes that had been fitted to the D.III prototypes. None of these engines were mature yet, leading aviation historian Jack Herris to speculate that entering these aircraft with pre-production engines in the competition might have had the primary purpose of developing the engines. The authors of The Illustrated Encyclopedia of Aircraft speculate that in addition to the engine change, the D.IV probably incorporated a revision to the wing structure used on the D.III.

== Specifications ==
Data from Aviatik Aircraft of WWI: A Centennial Perspective on Great War Airplane

General characteristics

- Crew: 1
- Wingspan: 9.0 m (29 ft 6 in)
- Wing area: 21.0 m^{2} (226 sq ft)
- Powerplant: 1 × Benz Bz.IIIbv liquid-cooled, V-eight piston engine, 145 kW (195 hp)
- Propellers: 4-bladed wooden, fixed-pitch

== Bibliography ==
- Gray, Peter & Thetford, Owen (1987) [1970]. German Aircraft of the First World War (2nd ed.). Putnam. ISBN 0-85177-809-7.
- Herris, Jack (2023). Aviatik Aircraft of WWI: A Centennial Perspective on Great War Airplanes. Great War Aviation Centennial Series. Vol. 10 (2nd ed.). n.p.: Aeronaut Books. ISBN 978-1-953201-59-1.
- The Illustrated Encyclopedia of Aircraft. London: Aerospace Publishing. 1981.
