= Albatros D.IX =

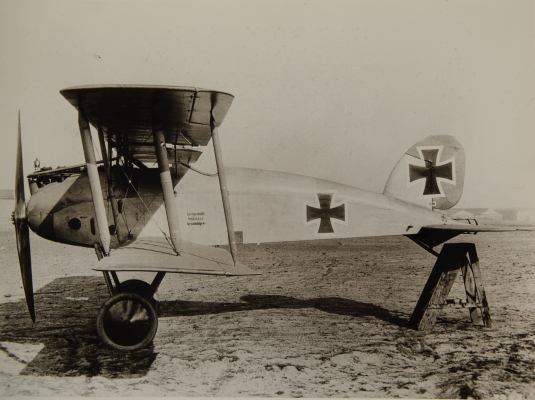

General information
- Type: Fighter
- Manufacturer: Albatros Flugzeugwerke
- Primary user: Germany
- Number built: 1

Albatros D.IX was a German prototype single-seat fighter built in early 1918. It differed from previous marks by using a simplified fuselage with a flat bottom and slab sides. The wings and tail were similar to those of the Albatros D.VII. Power was provided by a 130 kW (170 hp) Mercedes D.IIIa engine. The D.IX was armed with twin synchronised 7.92 mm (0.312 in) LMG 08/15 machine guns.

The prototype exhibited disappointing performance and the project was discontinued.

== Specifications ==
Data from The Complete Book of Fighters

General characteristics

- Crew: 1
- Length: 6.65 m (21 ft 10 in)
- Wingspan: 10.4 m (34 ft 1 in)
- Empty weight: 677 kg (1,492 lb)
- Gross weight: 897 kg (1,977 lb)
- Powerplant: 1 × Mercedes D.IIIa , 130 kW (180 hp)

Performance

- Maximum speed: 154 km/h (96 mph, 83 kn)
- Endurance: 1.5 hours
- Time to altitude: 1,000 m (3,300 ft) in 4 minutes

Armament
2 × 7.92 mm (0.312 in) LMG 08/15 machine guns synchronised to fire through the propeller disc
