= Aviatik =

German defunct aircraft manufacturer

- Industry: Aircraft manufacture
- Founded: 1909
- Defunct: 1919
- Fate: Closed under Treaty of Versailles
- Headquarters: Freiburg then Leipzig

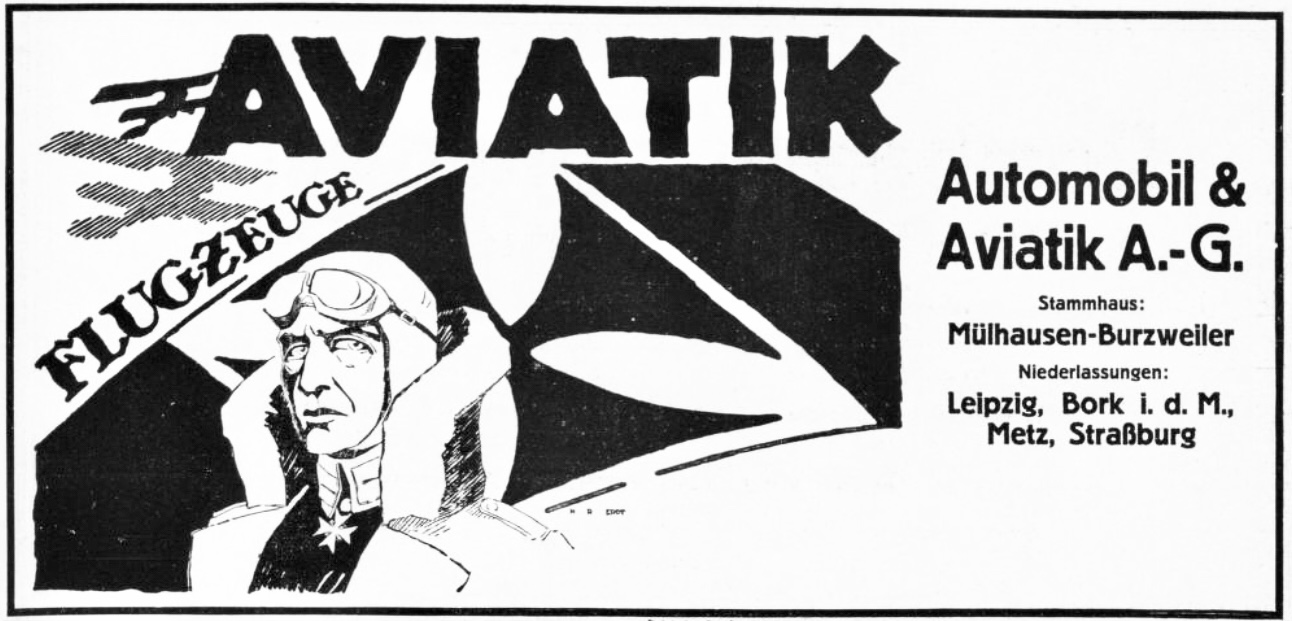
Aviatik AG (1918)

Automobil und Aviatik AG was a German aircraft manufacturer during World War I. The company was established at Mülhausen (today in France) in 1909 and soon became one of the country's leading producers of aircraft. It relocated to Freiburg in 1914 and to Leipzig in 1916 and established a subsidiary in Vienna as Österreichisch-Ungarische Flugzeugfabrik Aviatik. During the war, the company became best known for its reconnaissance aircraft, the B.I and B.II, although the Austro-Hungarian subsidiary also produced a number of its own designs, including fighters such as the D.I.

== History ==
The company was founded in December 1909 by the Alsatian Georges Chatel. It started with the license-production of French aircraft; Hanriot monoplanes and Farman biplanes. From 1912, the factory started building its own successful biplanes, designed by Robert Wild.

Just at the beginning of World War One, on 1 August 1914 the company was relocated to Freiburg due to French threat, and then to new facilities in Leipzig-Heiterblick in 1916. The company did not continue after the 1919 Treaty of Versailles.

== Aircraft ==
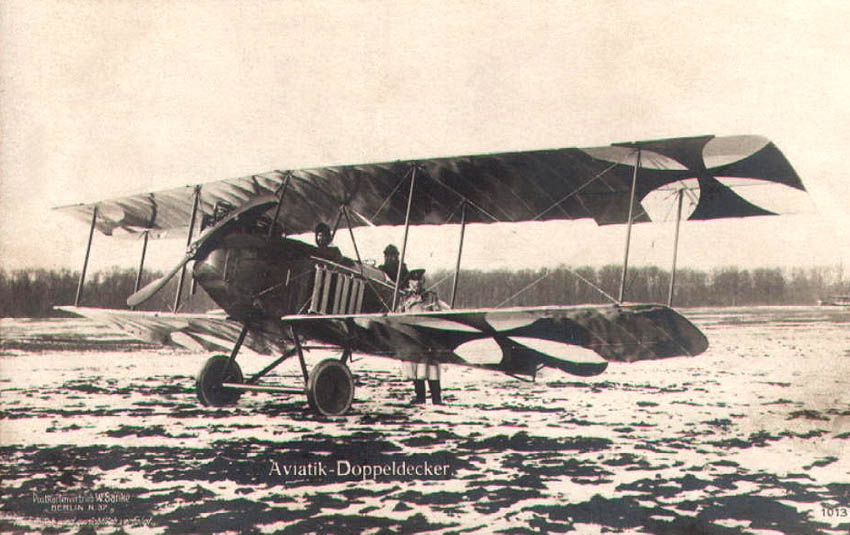
Aviatik B.I (P15 type)

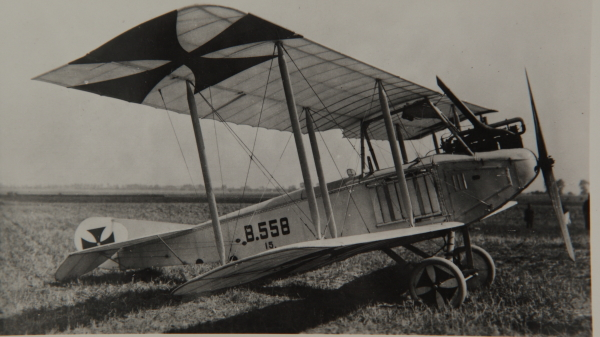
Aviatik B.II

- Aviatik B.I
- Aviatik B.II
- Aviatik B.III
- Aviatik C.I
- Aviatik C.II
- Aviatik C.III
- Aviatik C.V
- Aviatik (Ö) C.I
- Aviatik (Berg) D.I
- Aviatik (Berg) D.II
- Aviatik D.III
- Aviatik D.IV
- Aviatik D.V
- Aviatik D.VI
- Aviatik D.VII

== See also ==
- List of aircraft manufacturers

== Bibliography ==
- Gunston, Bill (1993). World Encyclopedia of Aircraft Manufacturers. Annapolis: Naval Institute Press. p. 34.
- Herris, Jack (2023). Aviatik Aircraft of WWI: A Centennial Perspective on Great War Airplanes. Great War Aviation Centennial Series. Vol. 10 (2nd ed.). n.p.: Aeronaut Books. ISBN 978-1-953201-59-1.
