= Benz Bz.IIIb =

Bz.IIIb
- Type: 8-cylinder Vee water-cooled piston engine
- National origin: Germany
- Manufacturer: Benz & Cie.

The Benz Bz.IIIb was an eight-cylinder, water-cooled, V-engine developed in Germany for use in aircraft in 1918.

== Design and development ==
Inspired by the Hispano-Suiza 8, some of which were captured and tested, the Benz Bz.IIIb was a fairly large engine, but its performance was disappointing. Despite not being accepted for service use, a number of late World War I prototype German aircraft used the Bz.IIIb, the Benz IIIbo and the geared Benz IIIbm. The latter suffered vibration problems.

== Applications ==
- AEG DJ.I
- AEG PE
- Albatros D.X
- Albatros Dr.II
- Albatros W.8
- Aviatik D.III
- Aviatik D.IV
- Aviatik D.V
- LFG Roland D.VII
- LFG Roland D.VIII

== Specifications (Benz Bz.IIIb) ==
=== General characteristics ===
- Type: 8-cylinder liquid-cooled 90° V engine
- Bore: 135 mm (5.31 in)
- Stroke: 135 mm (5.31 in)
- Displacement: 15.46 L (943 cu in)
- Length: 1,300 mm (51 in)
- Width: 860 mm (34 in)
- Height: 850 mm (33 in)
- Dry weight: 257 kg (568lb)

=== Components ===
- Fuel system: Carburetor
- Cooling system: Liquid-cooled

=== Performance ===
- Power output: maximum 200 hp at 1,750 rpm

== See also ==
Comparable engines

- Liberty L-8

Related lists

- List of aircraft engines
