= Aviatik B.I =

German two-seat reconnaissance biplane

B.I
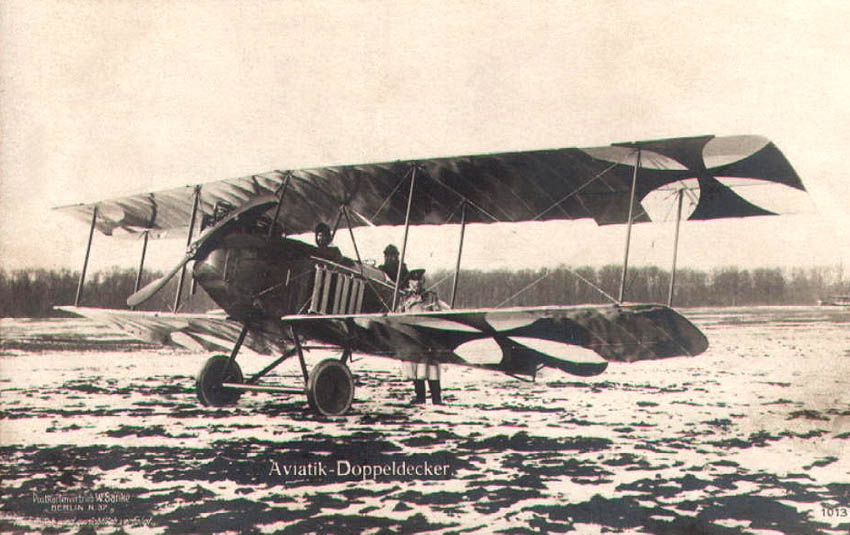
- Aviatik B.I (P15 type)

General information
- Type: Reconnaissance aircraft
- Manufacturer: Aviatik
- Designer: Robert Wild
- Primary user: Luftstreitkräfte

History
- Introduction date: 1914
- First flight: 1914
- Retired: 1916
- Variant: Aviatik B.II

The Aviatik B.I is a German two-seat reconnaissance biplane designed and built by the Automobil und Aviatik AG company, who until then had produced copies of French designs.

== Design and development ==
The first of indigenous Aviatik biplanes, designed by Robert Wild, was the P.13, flown in April–May 1912. It was built in several variants and featured large 3½-bay or 4-bay wings and . The type was widely used in competitions and gained high reputation. An improved design was the P.14 of 1913, with smaller 2½-bay wings and aerodynamic and structural refinements. Also in 1913, an ultimate refined design P.15 was built, with 2-bay or 3-bay wings and a fail fin.

The German air force became interested in Aviatik aircraft and ordered 101 P.13 and P.14s in 1913, then further orders followed. The crew sat in open tandem cockpits with the observer in the front. Initially they were designated just as Aviatik B, with a service number and two last digits of a year (e.g. B.268/13). From September 1915 the aircraft P.15 type were designated as B.I (P.15b with 100 hp engine) or B.II (P.15a with 120 hp engine). There is a supposition, that earlier B-class 100 hp Aviatiks might have been designated B.I as well. Aviatik B-class were unarmed, but in a course of the war, machine guns were sometimes used.

The B.I was manufactured in large numbers in Italy under licence by Società Aeronautica Meccanica Lombardia (SAML), which built 410 examples according to Aviatik's design. The firm then put two modified versions of their own into production, as designed by Robert Wild. The first of these, the SAML S.1 was powered by a Fiat A.12 engine and was armed with a Fiat-Revelli machine gun for the observer. The second version, the SAML S.2 was intended for the reconnaissance-bomber role and had a shorter wingspan, a fixed, forward-firing Fiat-Revelli machine gun in addition to the one in the rear cockpit, and a bomb load of 40 kg (90 lb). The 16 Squadriglie da Recognizione operated 660 S-1s and S-2s from 1917 onwards in Italy, Albania, and Macedonia. Two SAML S.1 participated in the Revolution of 1922 in Paraguay in the government side. They survived the conflict and they were the first planes of the new Military Aviation School, along a single Ansaldo SVA.5, an Ansaldo SVA.10 and a SPAD S.20. One S.1 was destroyed in an accident in 1928 but the other survived as a trainer during the Chaco War.

The Aviatik B.114/14 was the first aircraft shot down in aerial combat. On October 5, 1914, one was downed by a French Voisin III crewed by French pilot Sgt. Joseph Frantz and his mechanic/gunner, Louis Quénault. German pilot Wilhelm Schlichting was killed by gunfire, and his observer, Fritz von Zangen, perished in the subsequent crash.

== Variants ==
P.13
1912 two-seat reconnaissance biplane, (designated B.I).
P.14
1913 two-seat reconnaissance biplane, an improved P.13, 101 P.13 and P.14 aircraft ordered, (designated B.I).
P.15
two-seat reconnaissance biplane, (designated B.I).
P.15a
B.I aircraft with 100 hp (75 kW) engine.
P.15b
Avaitik B.II (powered by a 120 hp (89 kW) engine).
B
early deliveries of P.13 and P.14 Aviatiks were designated with B nnn/nn (B serial / year)
B.I
From 1915 P.15a with 100 hp (75 kW) engines.
B.II
From 1915 P.15b with 120 hp (89 kW) engines.
SAML S.1
410 B.I aircraft built by Società Aeronautica Meccanica Lombardia (SAML) in Italy.

== Operators ==
Austria-Hungary

- KuKLFT

Germany

- Luftstreitkrafte

Kingdom of Italy

- Corpo Aeronautico Militare

Paraguay

- Paraguayan Air Force

Turkey

- Turkish Air Force - Postwar, SAML Aviatik B.I .

== Specifications (P.15a B.I) ==
Data from Die deutschen Militärflugzeuge 1919-1934 : mit 143 Vierseitenrissen im Massstab 1:144

General characteristics

- Crew: 2
- Length: 7.93 m (26 ft 0 in)
- Wingspan: 14 m (45 ft 11 in)
- Height: 3.05 m (10 ft 0 in)
- Empty weight: 668 kg (1,473 lb)
- Gross weight: 1,090 kg (2,403 lb)
- Powerplant: × Mercedes D.I 6-cylinder liquid-cooled inline engine 105 PS (103.56 hp; 77.23 kW)
- Propellers: 2-bladed fixed-pitch propeller

Performance

- Maximum speed: 100 km/h (62 mph, 54 kn)
- Cruise speed: 90 km/h (56 mph, 49 kn)
- Range: 800 km (500 mi, 430 nmi)
- Time to altitude: 1,000 m (3,300 ft) in 15 minutes

== See also ==
Related lists

- List of military aircraft of Germany

== Bibliography ==
- Grosz, Peter M. Aviatik B-types. Berkhamsted: Albatros Productions, 2003. Windsock Datafile No.102. ISBN 0-948414-95-2.
- Herris, Jack (2023). Aviatik Aircraft of WWI: A Centennial Perspective on Great War Airplanes. Great War Aviation Centennial Series. Vol. 10 (2nd ed.). n.p.: Aeronaut Books. ISBN 978-1-953201-59-1.
- Sapienza, Antonio Luis (April 1999). "Le role de aviation lors de la révolution de 1922 au Paraguay" [The Role of Aircraft during the 1922 Paraguayan Revolution]. Avions: Toute l'aéronautique et son histoire (in French) (73): 24–26. ISSN 1243-8650.
