= Aviatik B.II (Germany) =

German reconnaissance aircraft

B.II (German)
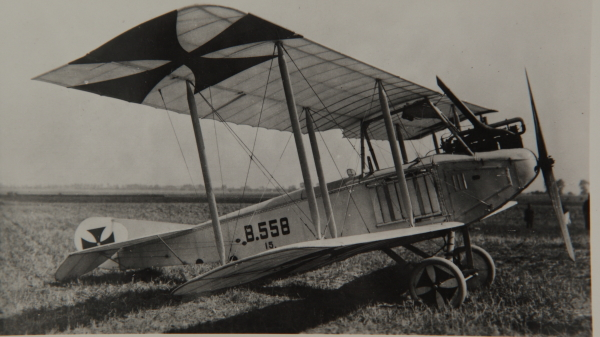
- A German Aviatik B.II

General information
- Type: Reconnaissance aircraft
- Manufacturer: Aviatik (Germany)
- Designer: Robert Wild
- Primary user: Luftstreitkräfte

History
- Introduction date: 1915
- First flight: 1915
- Retired: 1916

The Aviatik B.II was a reconnaissance aircraft built in Germany during World War I.

== Design and development ==
The (German) Aviatik B.II was a two-seat biplane of conventional configuration that seated its pilot and observer in tandem, open cockpits. Compared to its predecessor, the B.I, the B.II had a more powerful engine and revised nose design that faired the powerplant in more neatly, and a single "rhino horn" collector stack for the exhaust. A variety of two- and three-bay wing designs were utilised during production. While originally no armament was fitted (in common with other B- class aircraft), later production versions received a machine gun for the observer. All were withdrawn from front line service by early 1916, however the type continued in use as a trainer for a time with advanced flying training units (it is known that the B.II served in this role at FEA 9 at Darmstadt during 1916).

== Operators ==
German Empire

- Luftstreitkräfte

== Specifications ==
Data from

General characteristics

- Crew: 2
- Length: 7.1 m (23 ft 4 in)
- Wingspan: 12.35 m (40 ft 6 in)
- Height: 3.15 m (10 ft 4 in)
- Gross weight: 1,071 kg (2,361 lb)
- Powerplant: 1 × Mercedes D.II 6-cylinder water-cooled in-line piston engine, 89 kW (120 hp)
- Propellers: 2-bladed fixed-pitch propeller

Performance

- Maximum speed: 100 km/h (62 mph, 54 kn)
- Endurance: 4 hours
- Service ceiling: 6,100 m (20,000 ft)

== Bibliography ==
- Herris, Jack (2023). Aviatik Aircraft of WWI: A Centennial Perspective on Great War Airplanes. Great War Aviation Centennial Series. Vol. 10 (2nd ed.). Aeronaut Books. ISBN 978-1-953201-59-1.
