= No. 3 Squadron (Lithuanian Air Force) =

3rd Squadron of the Lithuanian Military Aviation
- Lietuvos karo aviacijos 3-ioji eskadrilė
- Founded: 1 April 1923
- Disbanded: 28 October 1940
- Country: Lithuania
- Branch: Lithuanian Military Aviation
- Type: Bomber squadron

Aircraft flown
- Bomber: Ansaldo A.120; De Havilland Dragon Rapide; LVG C.V; LVG C.VI

The 3rd Squadron of the Lithuanian Military Aviation (Lithuanian: Lietuvos karo aviacijos 3-ioji eskadrilė) was a light bomber squadron of the Lithuanian Military Aviation that existed from the spring of 1923 until the autumn of 1940. It was based in Kaunas from 1923 and in Šiauliai from 1933.

== Establishment ==
The 3rd Squadron was established on 1 April 1923. It was established as a bomber squadron and initially received reconnaissance aircraft manufactured in the German Empire during World War I that were then in service with the Lithuanian Military Aviation. These aircraft, the LVG C.V and LVG C.VI, were used as light bombers. The squadron's aircraft were subsequently modernised through the acquisition of newly purchased light bombers and twin-engined military transport aircraft.

Organisationally, the squadron formed part of the 3rd (Bomber) Group. The group also included the 4th Squadron, established in 1925.

== Commanders ==
Lieutenant Steponas Darius, a pilot of the 3rd Squadron (1921)

The squadron was commanded by:

- 1 April 1923 – 16 May 1934: Lieutenant, later Major, Antanas Strašaitis
- 16 May 1934 – 26 January 1939: Lieutenant Colonel Jonas Liorentas
- 26 January 1939 – 28 October 1940: Major Petras Masys

== Personnel ==
In 1923, the following personnel were assigned to the squadron: pilots Lieutenant J. Garolis, Lieutenant V. Čemarka, Lieutenant S. Darius, and Lieutenant A. Vasnevskis; observers Lieutenant Demidavičius and Senior Lieutenant V. Reimontas; and military official Bielskis. In the same year, Captain V. Gricevičius and Lieutenant J. Nastaras also joined the squadron.

In 1924, pilot Senior Lieutenant L. Zibavičius was assigned to the squadron.

In 1925, the following pilots were assigned to the squadron: Lance Corporal G. Heidrikis (Radvenis), Lieutenant H. Miltakis, Senior Lieutenant J. Pyragius, Senior Lieutenant B. Svilas, Senior Lieutenant M. Mačiokas, military official K. Mikolajūnas, and Lieutenant V. Klupšas.

In 1926, the following pilots were assigned to the squadron: Lieutenant V. Amonas, Senior Lieutenant V. Strazdas, Senior Lieutenant V. Mačiokas, Senior Lieutenant J. Špokevičius, Lieutenant B. Šulcas, and Lieutenant Č. Kudokas.

== Bases ==
From 1923 to 1933, the squadron was based at the Aleksotas–Žagariškiai Airfield in Kaunas, now known as S. Darius and S. Girėnas Airport.

From 1933 to 1940, the squadron was based at Zokniai Airfield near Šiauliai.

== Aircraft ==
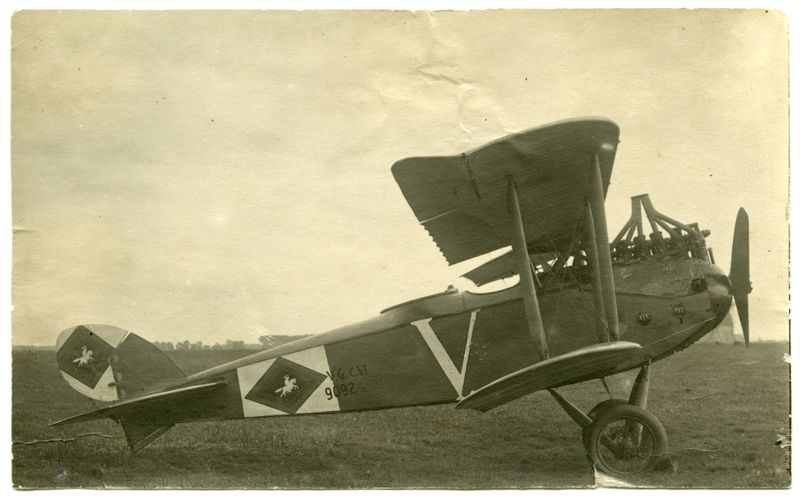
LVG C.VI with early roundels of the Lithuanian Air Force

In 1923, the squadron received one LVG C.V and five LVG C.VI reconnaissance aircraft, which were used as bombers. They remained in service until 1931.

In 1929, the squadron received new Italian reconnaissance aircraft used as light bombers, the Ansaldo A.120. Six aircraft of this type were assigned to the 3rd Squadron.

In 1937, the squadron received two twin-engined De Havilland 89M Dragon Rapide transport aircraft. They were used both for military transport and for training pilots intended to operate the twin-engined bombers planned for acquisition.

== Activities ==
Ansaldo A.120

From 18 to 23 August 1930, Ansaldo A.120 aircraft of the 3rd Squadron took part in a Lithuanian Military Aviation flight to Moscow. The flight covered a distance of 970 km and lasted 5 hours and 20 minutes. The arrival and welcome scene was filmed and the footage has survived.

== Disbandment ==
The squadron was disbanded after the occupation and anexation of Lithuania by the Soviet Union. Formally it was dissolved on 28 October 1940 along with other units of Lithuanian Military Aviation. The Soviet Air Forces did not take over the aircraft previously operated by the squadron, with the exception of the De Havilland Dragon Rapide aircraft. The older aircraft were used as training targets at firing ranges.

== Bibliography ==
- 3-oji eskadrilė. Plieno sparnai. https://www.plienosparnai.lt/page.php?806 (in Lithuanian).
- D.H.89M Dragon Rapide. Plieno sparnai. https://www.plienosparnai.lt/page.php?417 (in Lithuanian).
- Lukminaitė, Solveiga. "Lietuvos karo aviacijos lakūną Jeronimą Garolį menančios muziejinės vertybės VDKM rinkiniuose." Vytauto Didžiojo karo muziejaus almanachas, no. 14. Kaunas, 2020. https://www.vdkaromuziejus.lt/wp-content/uploads/2020/12/Internetui.VDKmuziejus-almanachas.pdf (in Lithuanian).
- Sereičikas, Mindaugas. "Lietuvos karo aviacijos lakūnų ženklai ant lėktuvų, II dalis." Kardas, no. 3 (471), 2016 (in Lithuanian).
- Kauno aerodromui Aleksote – 100 metų (1 dalis). Lietuvos aidas. https://www.aidas.lt/lt/transportas/article/12939-07-25-kauno-aerodromui-aleksote-100-metu-1-dalis (in Lithuanian).
