= LVG C.VI =

Reconnaissance and artillery spotting aircraft

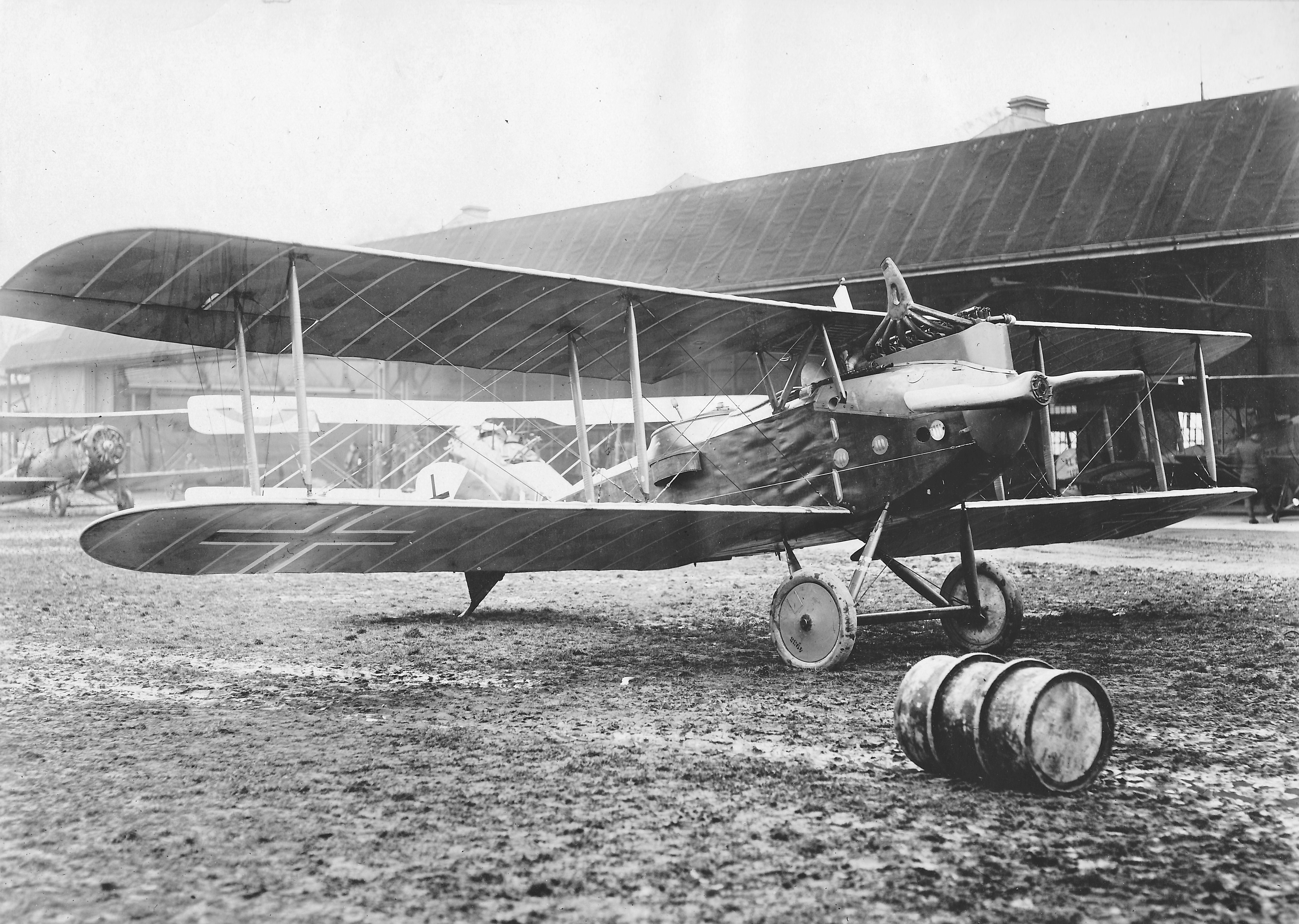

General information
- Type: Reconnaissance aircraft
- Manufacturer: Luft-Verkehrs-Gesellschaft G.m.b.H.
- Primary user: Luftstreitkräfte
- Number built: 1,100

History
- Manufactured: 1918
- Introduction date: 1918
- First flight: 1917
- Developed from: LVG C.V

The LVG C.VI was a German two-seat reconnaissance and artillery spotting aircraft used during World War I.

== Development ==
The aircraft was designed by Willy Sabersky-Müssigbrodt and developed by Luft-Verkehrs-Gesellschaft (LVG) in 1917. The C.VI was a further development of the C.V, which Sabersky-Müssigbrodt had made for his former employer DFW. It was lighter, smaller and aerodynamically refined, although its fuselage seemed more bulky. It was a biplane of mixed, mostly wooden construction. It featured a semi-monocoque fuselage, plywood covered. Rectangular wings of wooden and metal construction, canvas covered. Upper wing of slightly greater span, shifted some 25 cm (10 in) towards front. Vertical fin plywood covered, rudder and elevators of metal frame canvas covered, stabilizers (tailplanes) of wooden frame canvas covered. Straight uncovered engine in the fuselage nose, with a chimney-like exhaust pipe. Two-blade Benz wooden propeller, 2.88 m (9.45 ft) diameter. Flat water radiator in central section of upper wing. Fixed conventional landing gear, with a straight common axle and a rear skid. Aircraft were equipped with a radio (morse;send only); transmissions were by means of an antenna which could be lowered below the aircraft when needed. The crew had parachutes and heated flying suits. A total of 1,100 aircraft of the type were manufactured.

Post-war several C.VIs with passenger cabins aft of the open cockpit were converted by Raab-Katzenstein as the LVG P.I, LVG P.II and alternatively Raab-Katzenstein RK-8 Marabu.

== Operational service ==
Most LVG C.VIs were used by the German military aviation in last operations of World War I, mostly on Western Front, for close reconnaissance and observation.

After the war, Deutsche Luft-Reederei (DLR) used several C.VIs to provide mail and passenger transport service. The Polish Air Force used several aircraft during the Polish-Soviet war, one left by the Germans, another completed from parts in 1920 and several more bought abroad.

Suomen ilmailuliikenne Oy purchased two C.VIs in 1923, from a Swedish airline that had gone bankrupt in 1922, becoming the predecessor to Aero O/Y and Finnair.

The Finnish Air Force purchased two aircraft; one destroyed in a spin in Santahamina in 1923, the other used until the end of 1924.

More than 20 were used by Lithuania, two of which survived until 1940.

Three were used in Czechoslovakia, two in Switzerland (1920–1929) and several in the USSR.

== Surviving aircraft ==
Today, there are three surviving C.VIs. One is currently being restored at the Royal Air Force Museum Midlands in Cosford, one is on display at the Royal Museum of the Armed Forces and Military History in Belgium and the third one is at the Musée de l'Air et de l'Espace in Paris.

== Operators ==
Belgium

- Belgian Air Force
- SNETA

Bolivia

- Named Litoral in Lloyd Aéreo Boliviano 1929

Czechoslovakia

- Czechoslovak Air Force

Finland

- Finnish Air Force
- Suomen ilmailuliikenne Oy

German Empire

- Luftstreitkräfte
- Deutsche Luft-Reederei

Latvia

- Latvian Air Force

Lithuania

- Lithuanian Air Force

Poland

- Polish Air Force

Romania

- Romanian Air Corps - 11 aircraft used from 1919

Soviet Union

- Soviet Air Force

Sweden

- Swedish Navy

Switzerland

- Swiss Air Force

== Specifications (C.VI) ==
Data from Thulinista Hornettiin

General characteristics

- Crew: 2
- Length: 7.45 m (24 ft 5 in)
- Wingspan: 13 m (42 ft 8 in)
- Height: 2.85 m (9 ft 4 in)
- Wing area: 37 m^{2} (400 sq ft)
- Empty weight: 945 kg (2,083 lb)
- Max takeoff weight: 1,390 kg (3,064 lb)
- Powerplant: 1 × Benz Bz.IV 6-cylinder water-cooled in-line piston engine, 147 kW (197 hp)
- Propellers: 2-bladed fixed-pitch propeller

Performance

- Maximum speed: 170 km/h (110 mph, 92 kn)
- Range: 400 km (250 mi, 220 nmi)
- Service ceiling: 6,500 m (21,300 ft)
- Rate of climb: 4.17 m/s (820 ft/min)

Armament

- 1 × 7.92 mm (.312 in) LMG 08/15 fixed with an interruptor gear
- 1 × 7.92 mm (.312 in) Parabellum MG14 machine gun on a ring mounting
- 90 kg (200 lb) of bombs

== See also ==
Related development

- LVG C.V

Aircraft of comparable role, configuration, and era

- Albatros C.XII
- DFW C.V

Related lists

- List of military aircraft of Germany
- List of military aircraft of Finland

== Bibliography ==
- Herris, Jack (2019). LVG Aircraft of WWI: Volume 3: C.VI–C.XI & Fighters: A Centennial Perspective on Great War Airplanes. Great War Aviation Centennial Series. Vol. 36. Charleston, South Carolina: Aeronaut Books. ISBN 978-1-935881-74-2.
- Kabatek, Mateusz & Kulczynski, Fr. Robert SDB (2022). German Aircraft in Polish Service: Volume 1: Halberstadt Cl.II, Cl.IV, C.V; LVG C.VI; & Hannover Cl.V. Great War Aviation Centennial Series. Vol. 70. n.p.: Aeronaut Books. ISBN 978-1-953201-58-4.
- Klaauw, Bart van der (March–April 1999). "Unexpected Windfalls: Accidentally or Deliberately, More than 100 Aircraft 'arrived' in Dutch Territory During the Great War". Air Enthusiast (80): 54–59. ISSN 0143-5450.
