= LVG D.III =

WWI German fighter aircraft

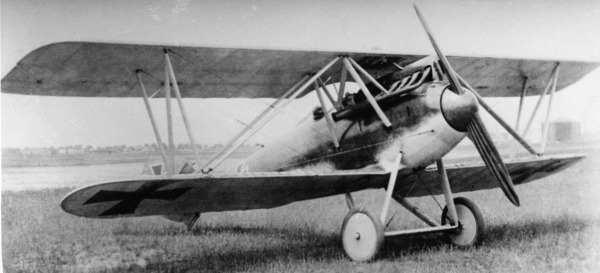

General information
- Type: Fighter
- Manufacturer: LVG
- Number built: 1

History
- First flight: May 1917

The LVG D.III was a German fighter plane built by LVG in World War I.

== Design ==
The D.III was similar to the LVG D.II, being a single-seat biplane fighter with wings of unequal span and a plywood covered semi-monocoque fuselage. 'N' struts between the wings and two sets of 'V' struts held the center section of the upper wing above the fuselage. The lower wing had rounded tips, while upper wings had straight tips with a slight angle.

== Development ==
Test flights began in May 1917 and were completed by 2 June 1917. However, the Idflieg decided that the D.III was too large and too heavy, so the D.III remained a prototype.

== Specifications ==
Data from German Aircraft of the First World War

General characteristics

- Crew: 1
- Length: 7.53 m (24 ft 8 in)
- Wingspan: 10 m (32 ft 10 in)
- Height: 2.92 m (9 ft 7 in)
- Wing area: 26.2 m^{2} (282 sq ft)
- Empty weight: 816 kg (1,799 lb)
- Gross weight: 1,071 kg (2,361 lb)
- Powerplant: 1 × N.A.G. III 6-cylinder water-cooled in-line piston engine, 140 kW (190 hp)
- Propellers: 2-bladed fixed-pitch propeller

Performance

- Maximum speed: 175 km/h (109 mph, 94 kn)
- Endurance: 2 hours
- Time to altitude: 5,000 m (16,000 ft) in 25 minutes

Armament

- Guns: 2 × LMG 08/15 machine guns

== Bibliography ==
- Herris, Jack (2019). LVG Aircraft of WWI: Volume 3: C.VI–C.XI & Fighters: A Centennial Perspective on Great War Airplanes. Great War Aviation Centennial Series. Vol. 36. Charleston, South Carolina: Aeronaut Books. ISBN 978-1-935881-74-2.
