= Šiauliai Air Base =

Šiauliai International Airport Šiaulių tarptautinis oro uostas
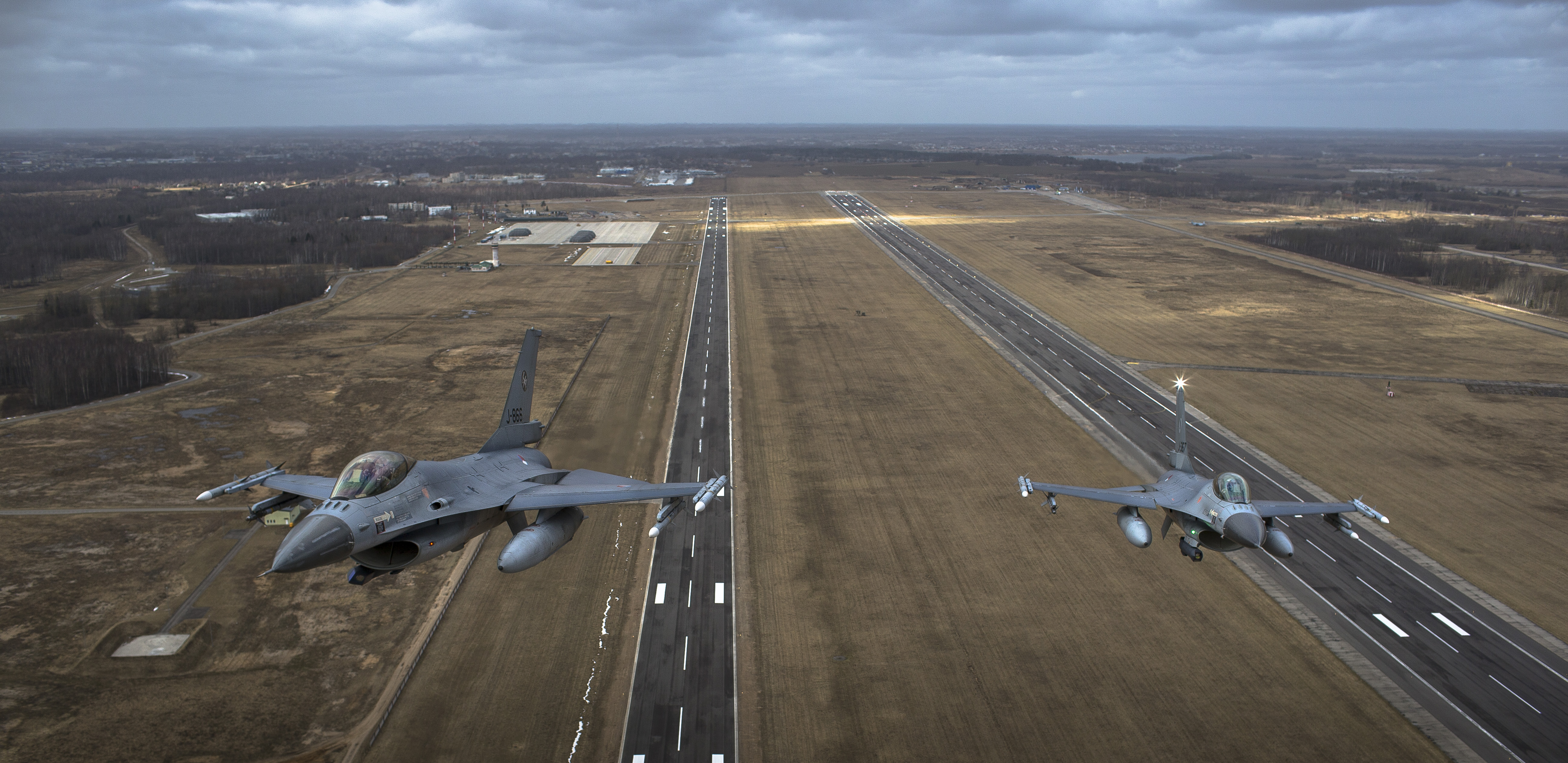
- IATA: SQQ; ICAO: EYSA

Summary
- Airport type: Public / military
- Owner: Lithuanian Armed Forces
- Operator: Lithuanian Air Force
- Location: Šiauliai, Lithuania
- Built: 1931
- In use: 1931 - present
- Elevation AMSL: 135 m (443 ft)
- Coordinates: 55°53′38″N 023°23′41″E
- Website: siauliai-airport.com

Maps
- Location of the airport in Lithuania
- Interactive map of Šiauliai International Airport

Runways
Direction	Length		Surface
Direction	m	ft	Surface
14L/32R	3,500	11,483	Asphalt
14R/32L	3,280	10,761	Asphalt

Šiauliai Air Base is a major military facility of the Lithuanian Air Force and one of the air bases of the NATO Baltic Air Policing mission. Šiauliai International Airport (IATA: SQQ, ICAO: EYSA) operates within the base as a civilian airport. The joint-use airport is also known by its historic name of Zokniai aerodrome (Lithuanian: Zoknių aerodromas) and is located 7 kilometres (4.3 mi) southeast of the city of Šiauliai in northern Lithuania.

== History ==
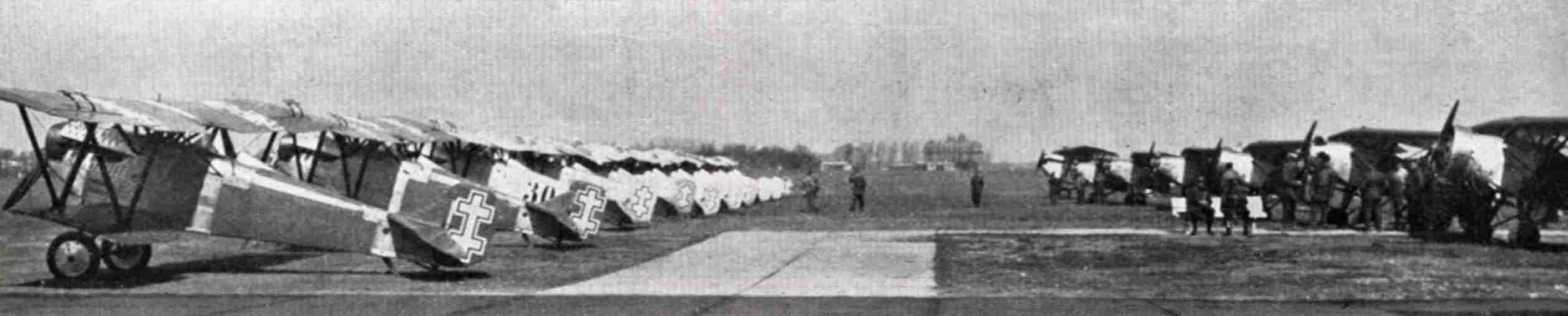
Aircraft of the Lithuanian Air Force in Zokniai, 1937

Zokniai area was first used as an aerial warfare facility in 1916–1917, when the German forces built hangars for their Zeppelin airships.

The Lithuanian Air Force began expanding during the Interwar period, as Lithuania was acquiring foreign aircraft as well as domestically produced ANBO-series aircraft, making the Kaunas aerodrome insufficient.

In 1931, Zokniai aerodrome was established as a second airbase for the Lithuanian Air Force. It was a base of the 3rd, 4th and 5th squadrons. At that time, it was able to host 35 aircraft, including Ansaldo A.120, Letov Š-20, Gloster Gladiator, de Havilland Dragon Rapide and the domestically produced ANBO IV and ANBO 41. At that time a small repair facilities were built along with concrete hangars. For a brief time, the aerodrome also hosted Lituanica II.

Following the Soviet occupation of Lithuania, the aerodrome was taken over by the Soviet forces in June 1940. On June 26, 1941 the airfield was taken over without a battle by advancing German forces, which controlled it until July 27, 1944.

First concrete runways were first built during the German occupation in 1943. Two parallel runways, 3.5 km (2.2 mi) and 3.2 km (2.0 mi) long, were built by 1957 for Ilyushin Il-28 and it became a major military airport able to host jet fighters and strategic bombers. It was one of only six Soviet airbases capable of handling the Myasishchev M-4 bomber. From late 1960s to early 1980s it was one of two main bases of Soviet AWACS - Tupolev Tu-126.

Following the independence restoration in 1990, the airport was subsequently returned to the Lithuanian control after withdrawal of Russian army in January - August 1993 and subsequently became a base for Lithuanian Air Force. In 1990s, it was renovated and equipped for civilian operations. In 1994, Šiauliai Airport was granted the status of international airport. It was further modernized in 2004 when Lithuania joined NATO. It became a NATO air base, hosting the Baltic Air Policing mission. The first NATO F-16 jet fighters from the Belgian Air Component landed in March 2004.

== Facilities ==
The airport is owned and administered by the Lithuanian Armed Forces.

=== Military base ===
Officially Lithuanian Air Force Air Base, more commonly known as Šiauliai Air Base, is the headquarters of the Lithuanian Air Force since nearly all its aircraft operate out of it, including C-27J Spartan transporters and Eurocopter AS365 Dauphin helicopters. The base has Air Force Armament and Equipment Repair Depot. In 2020, around 400 military and civilian staff worked in the air base.

NATO Baltic Air Policing mission provides airspace security for the three Baltic members of NATO, including Quick Reaction Alert. The base hosted a variety of aircraft from the NATO allies, including the fifth-generation fighters F-22 Raptor and F-35 Lightning II as well as other types of aircraft, such as KC-135 Stratotanker and E-3 Sentry (AWACS).

=== Civilian facilities ===
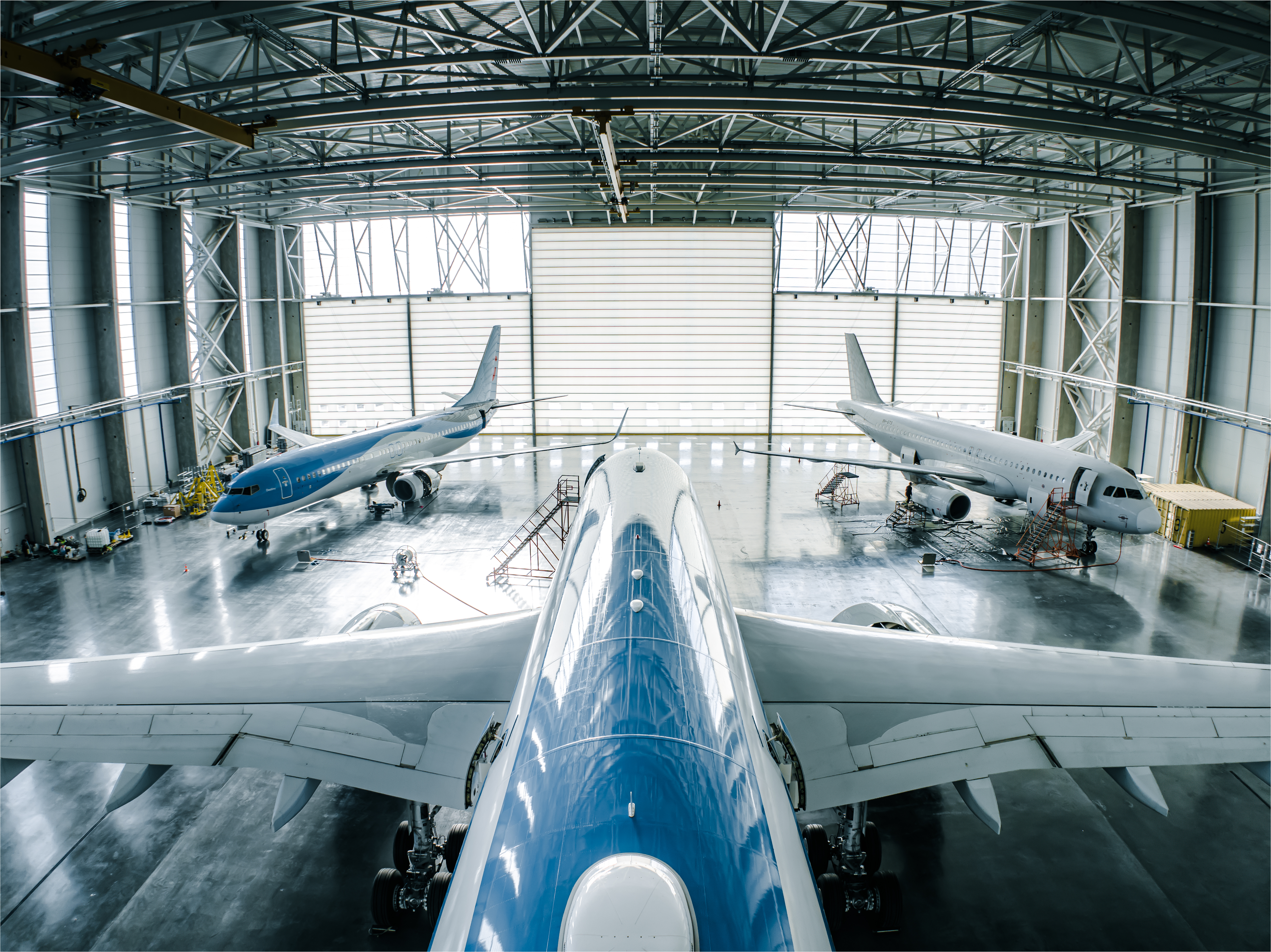
Inside of a hangar of the Šiauliai airport.

The civilian use is primarily for the aircraft maintenance and cargo transportation. The airport has a passenger terminal, meeting the requirements of the Schengen Area, but it is used only for the irregular flights. Since the airport is also a military facility, it is not subject to noise regulations and is open 24 hours a day.

Šiauliai Airport is a regional centre for the aircraft maintenance and parking, with several companies operating in the airport, including "J&C Aero" and "Aviatic MRO". Runways have a capacity to accept larger aircraft, such as Boeing 747 or Airbus A330.

The airport has infrastructure for storage and customs and has been expanding its commercial cargo operations.

In December 1999, a consortium of US companies proposed that Šiauliai Airport be included in an international network of spaceports intended to support commercial space flights. Representatives of the airport's shareholders and the Šiauliai city authorities held talks with the companies about the proposal.

== Gallery ==
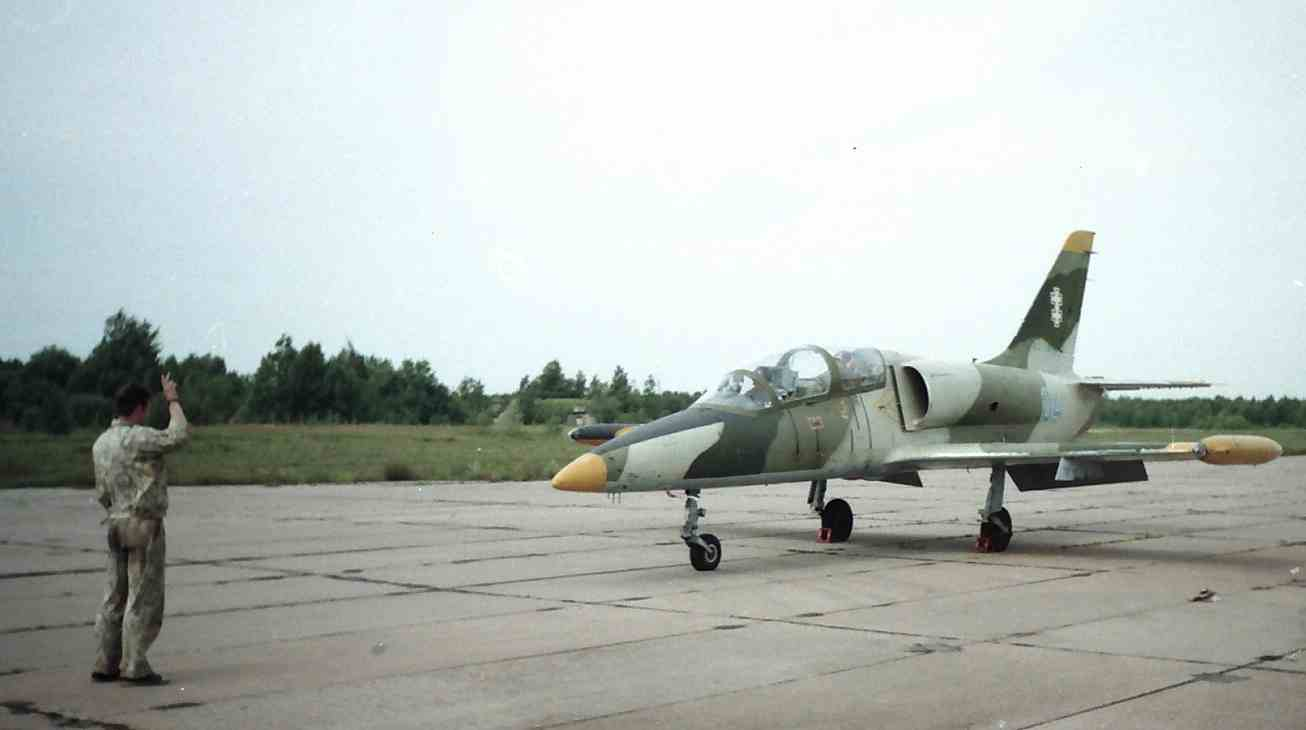
Lithuanian Air Force Aero L-39C, Zokniai, 2006.

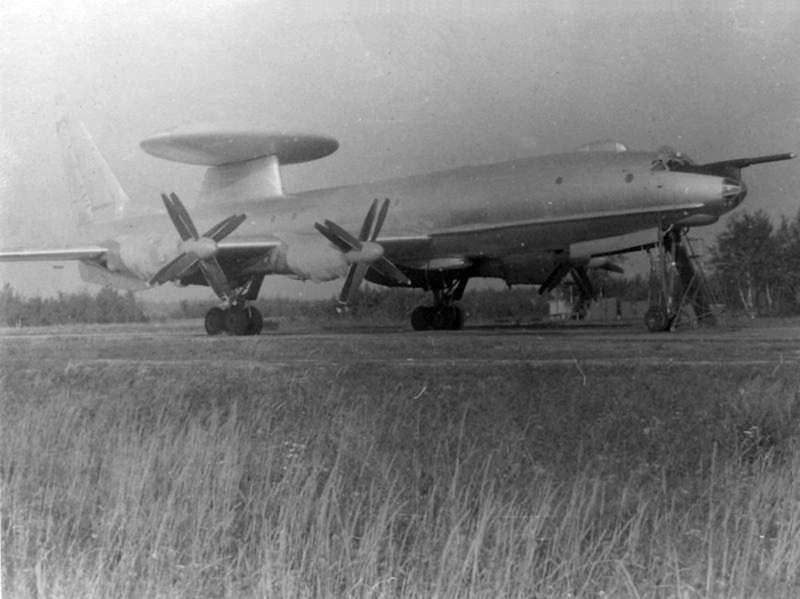
Zokniai-based Soviet Air Force Tupolev Tu-126, circa 1977.

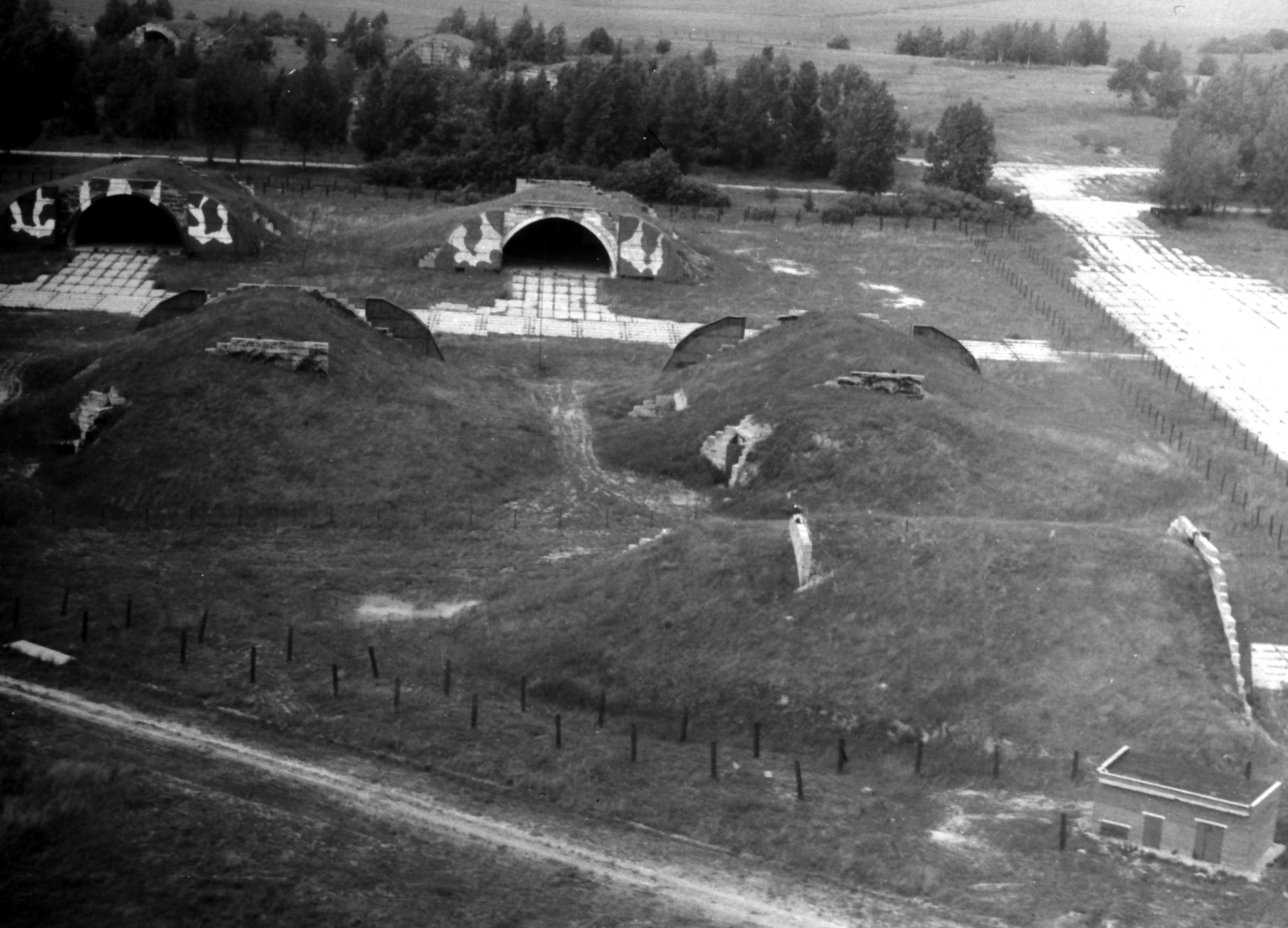
Hardened aircraft shelters in the 1990s.

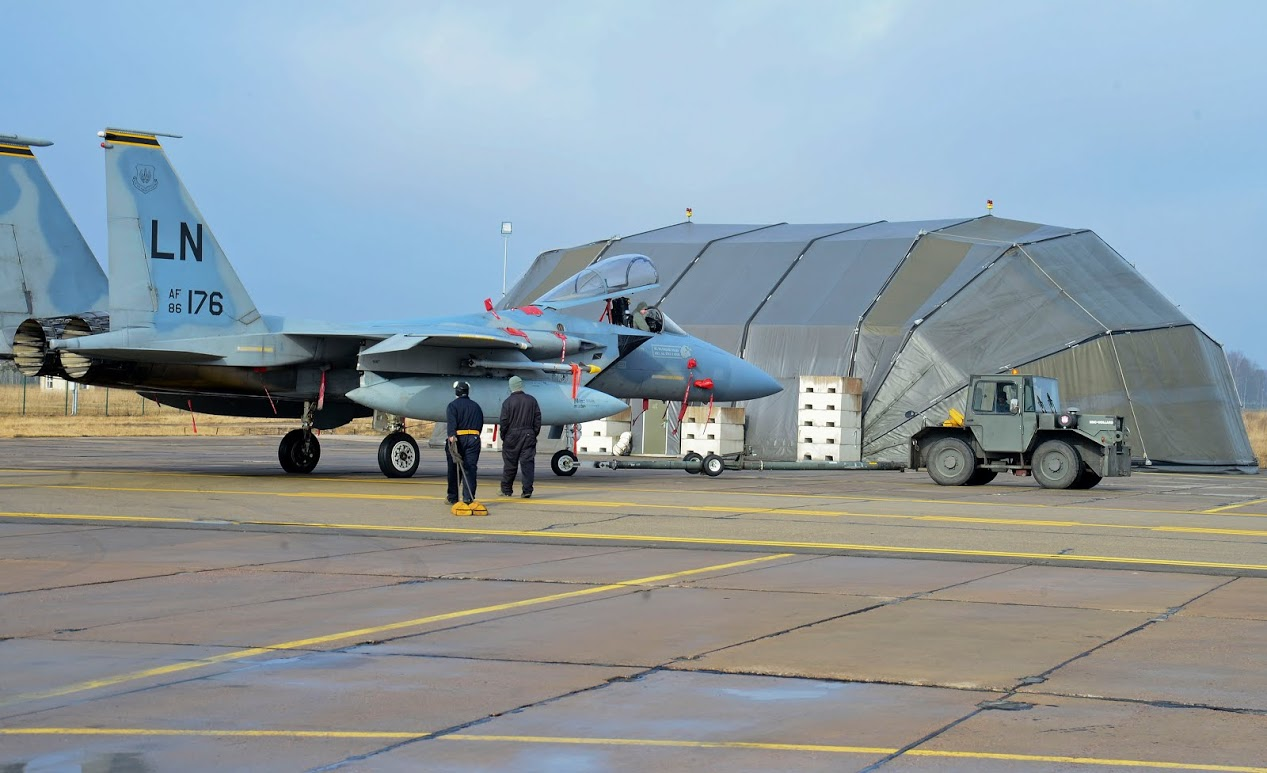
US Air Force F-15C in 2014.

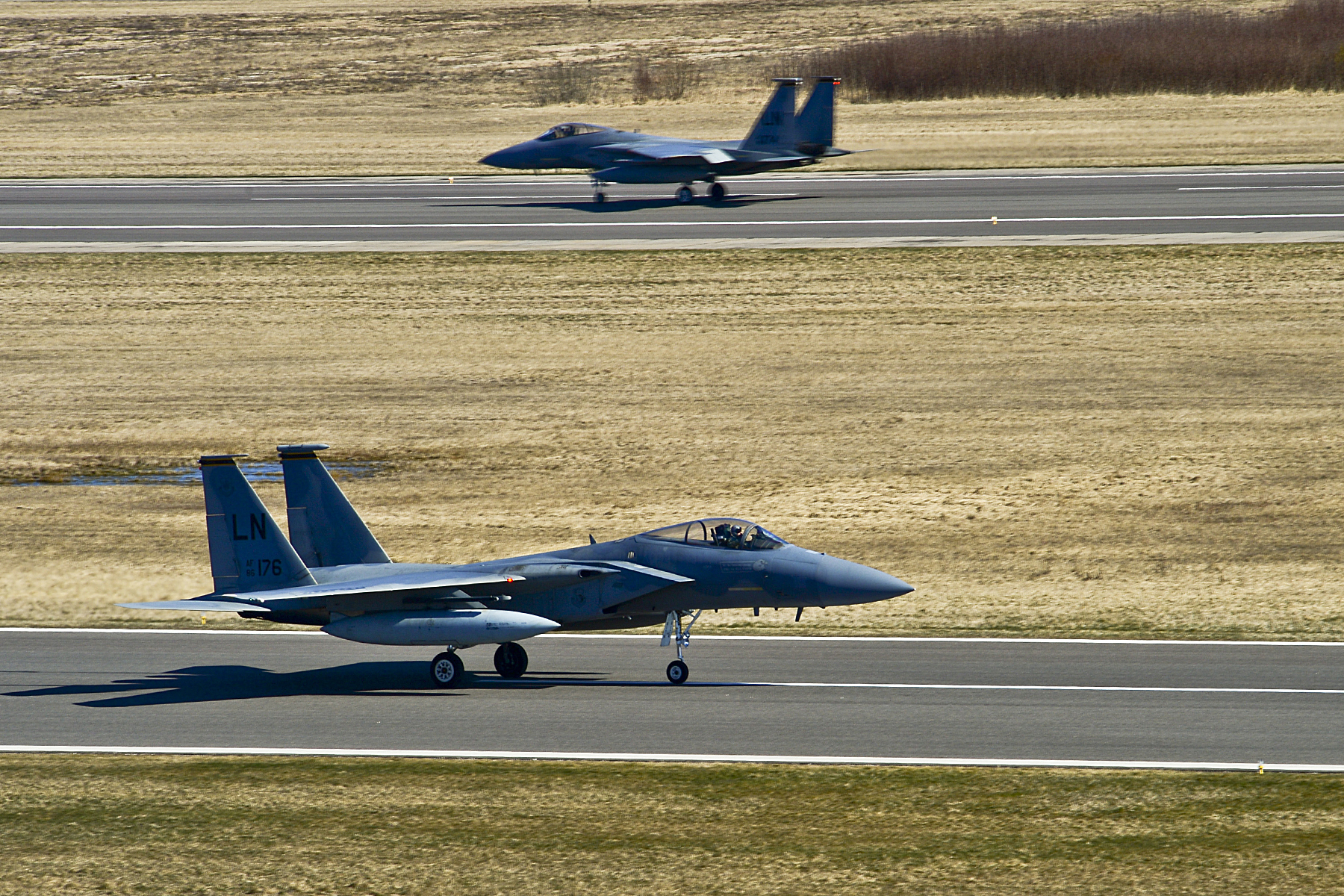
F-15C jet fighters on the runways.

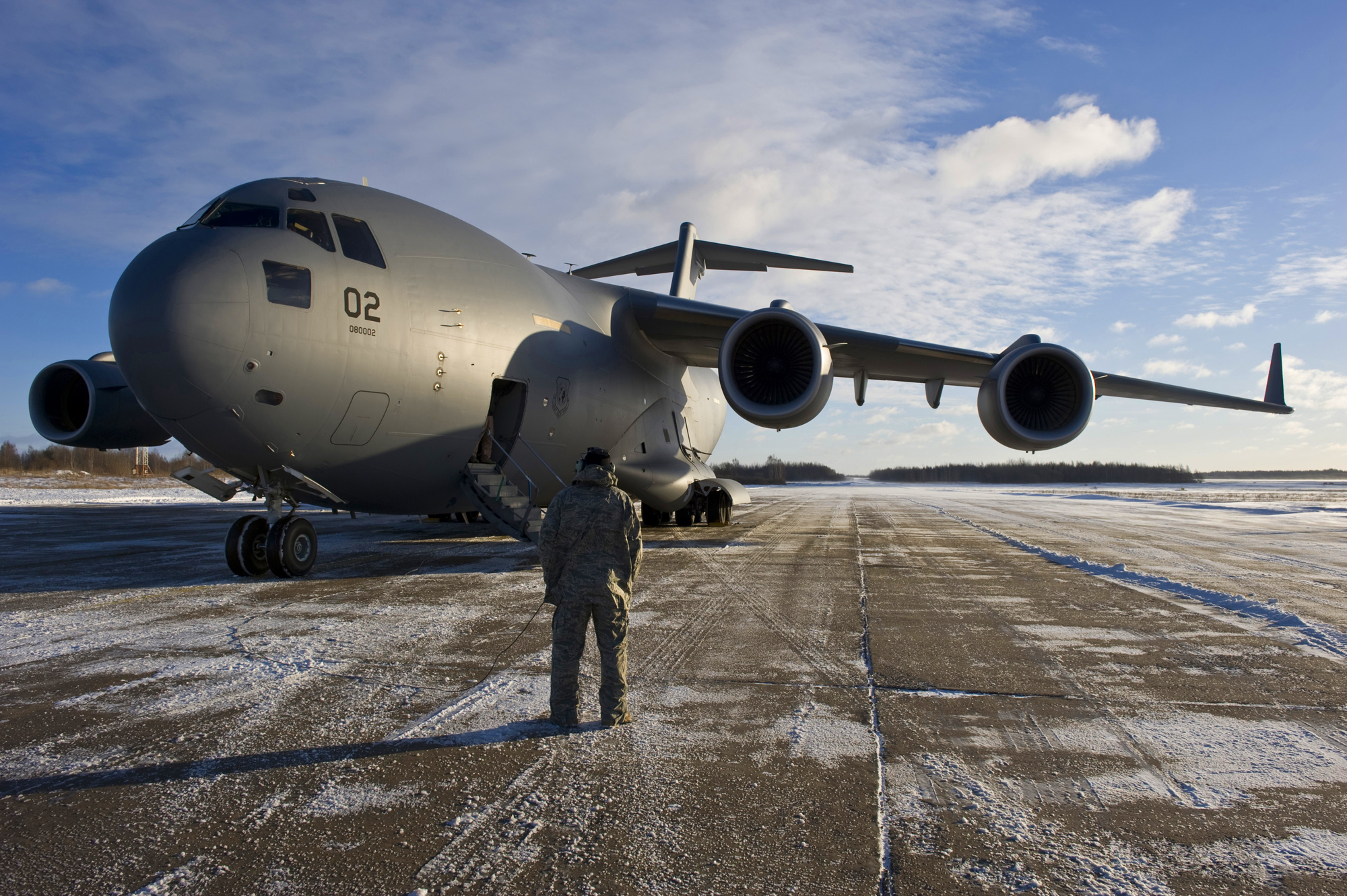
C-17 Globemaster III on the airfield in winter.

== See also ==
- Ämari Air Base
- Lielvārde Air Base
