= LVG C.II =

1910s German aircraft

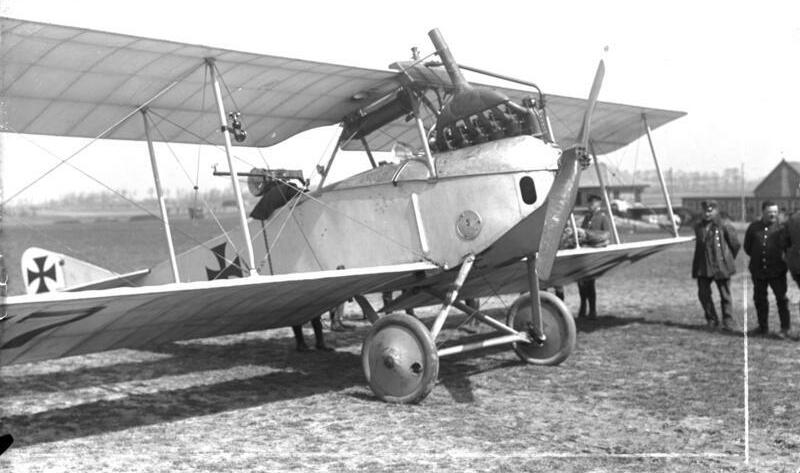
- LVG C.II armed with a Bergman machine gun in the observer's cockpit.

General information
- Type: reconnaissance/light bomber
- National origin: Germany
- Manufacturer: Luft-Verkehrs-Gesellschaft
- Primary user: Luftstreitkräfte
- Number built: c. 300

History
- Introduction date: late 1915
- Developed from: LVG B.I

The LVG C.II was a 1910s German two-seat reconnaissance biplane designed at the Luft-Verkehrs-Gesellschaft for the Luftstreitkräfte.

== Development ==
The C.II was developed from the LVG B.I, with the pilot and observer positions reversed, adding a ring-mounted machine gun to the rear. The increase in weight required a larger engine, the Benz Bz.III. Few C.I's were built before the C.II was introduced. It incorporated structural improvements and a more powerful engine.

== Operational history ==
The C.IV was the first fixed-wing aircraft to bomb London, when six bombs were dropped near Victoria Station on 28 November 1916. (The first air raid on London was by the Zeppelin LZ 38, in the early hours of 1 June 1915.)

== Variants ==
- LVG C.I - initial design, 120 kW (160 hp) Benz Bz.III engine.
- LVG C.II - production version.
- LVG C.III - single experimental aircraft, observer and machine gun moved to front.
- LVG C.IV - slightly larger, 160 kW (220 hp) Mercedes D.IV engine.

== Operators ==
German Empire

- Luftstreitkrafte
- Kaiserliche Marine

Switzerland

- Swiss Air Force

== Specifications (C.II) ==

Data from Donald, David, The Encyclopedia of World Aircraft (pg 553). (1997). Prospero Books. ISBN 1-85605-375-X

General characteristics

- Crew: 2
- Capacity: 2
- Length: 8.10 m (26 ft 7 in)
- Wingspan: 12.85 m (42 ft 2 in)
- Height: 2.93 m (9 ft 7.25 in)
- Wing area: 37.60 m^{2} (404.74 sq ft)
- Empty weight: 845 kg (1,863 lb)
- Gross weight: 1,405 kg (3,097 lb)
- Powerplant: 1 × Mercedes D.III , 119 kW (160 hp)

Performance

- Maximum speed: 130 km/h (81 mph, 70 kn)
- Range: 385 km (240 mi, 210 nmi)
- Endurance: 4 hours
- Service ceiling: 4,000 m (13,125 ft)
- Wing loading: 37 kg/m^{2} (7.6 lb/sq ft)

Armament

- 1 × flexible 7.92 mm (.312 in) Parabellum MG14 machine gun
- 1 × fixed, forward-firing 7.92 mm (.312 in) LMG 08/15 machine gun (later production aircraft)
- up to 60 kg (130 lb) of light bombs

== See also ==
Related lists

- List of military aircraft of Germany
