= LVG =

Defunct German aircraft manufacturer

Luftverkehrsgesellschaft (LVG)
- Industry: Aircraft manufacture
- Founded: 1912
- Headquarters: Johannisthal, Germany
- Key people: Franz Schneider

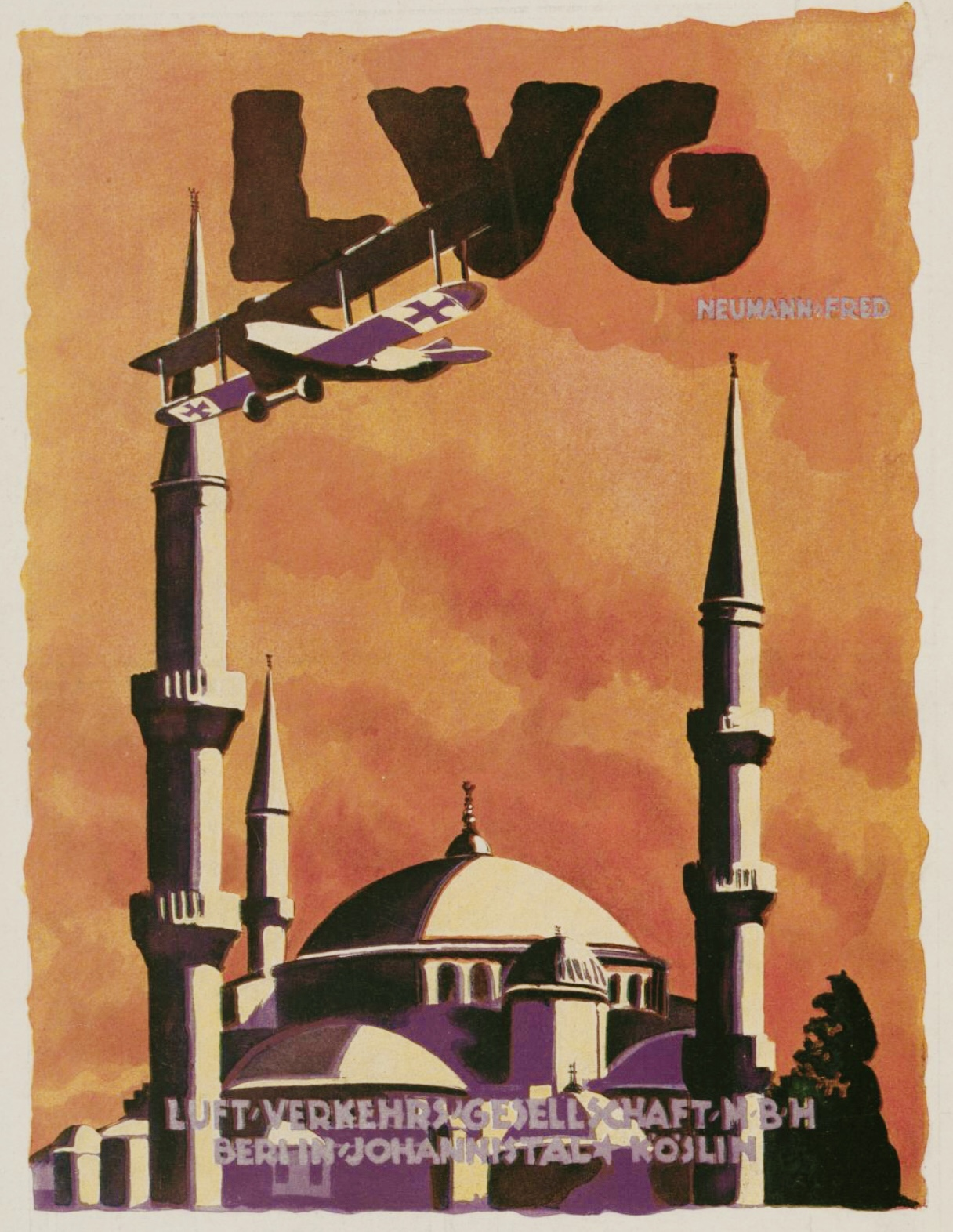
LVG (1918)

Luftverkehrsgesellschaft m.b.H. (L.V.G. or LVG) was a German aircraft manufacturer based in Berlin-Johannisthal, which began constructing aircraft in 1912, building Farman-type aircraft. The company constructed many reconnaissance and light bomber biplanes during World War I.

The raid on London in 1916 was conducted by one LVG C.IV. It dropped its bombs near London Victoria station, but was shot down by French anti-aircraft gunners on its way home.

== Aircraft ==
=== Own designs ===
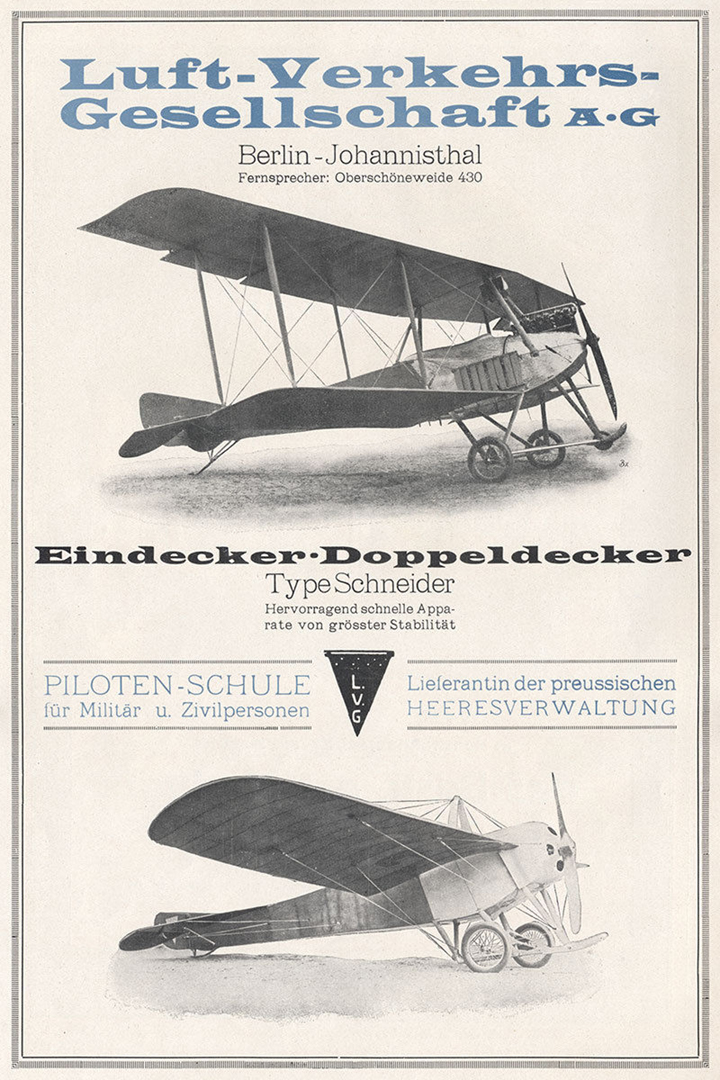
Period company advertisement

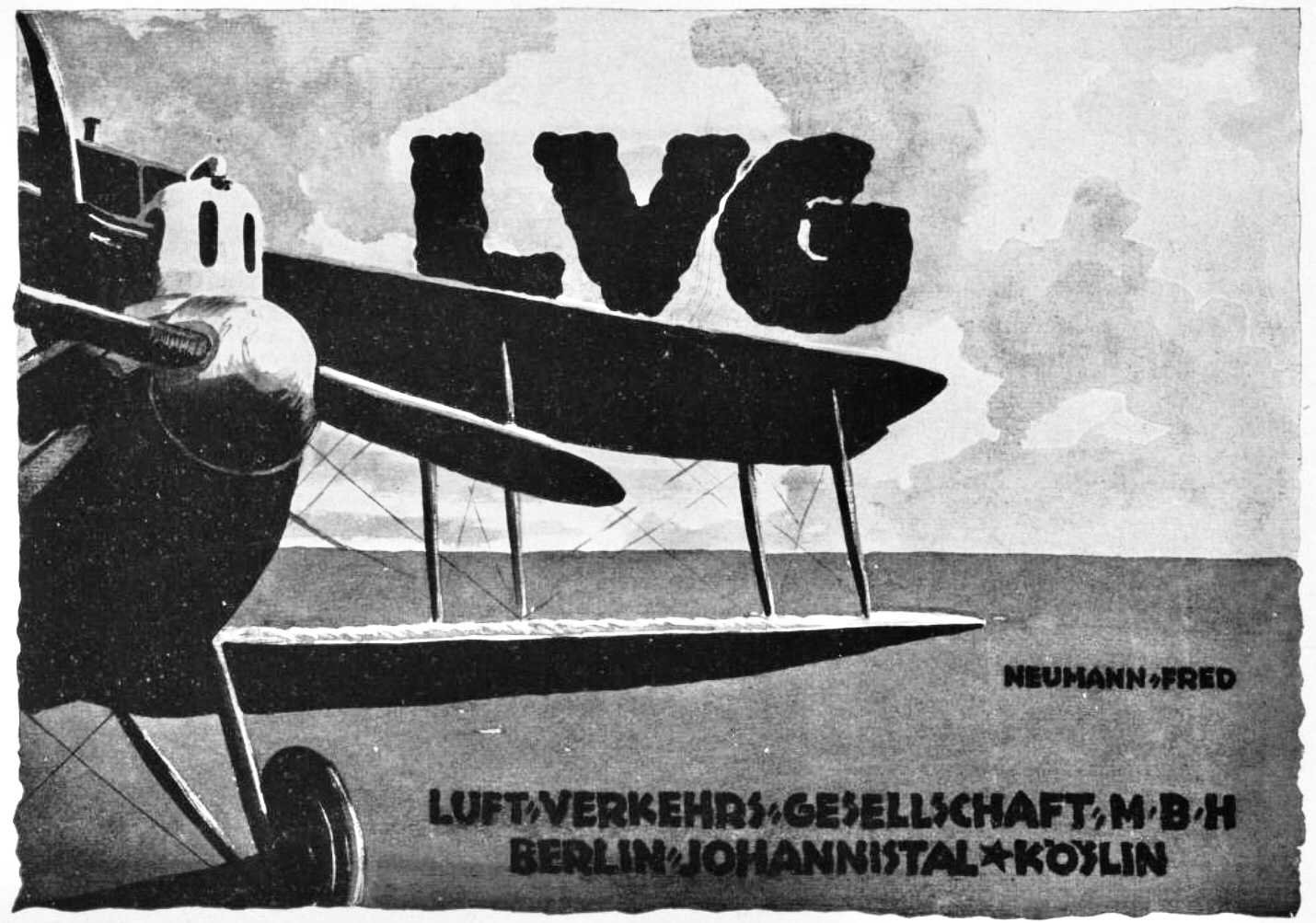
LVG advertisement (1918)

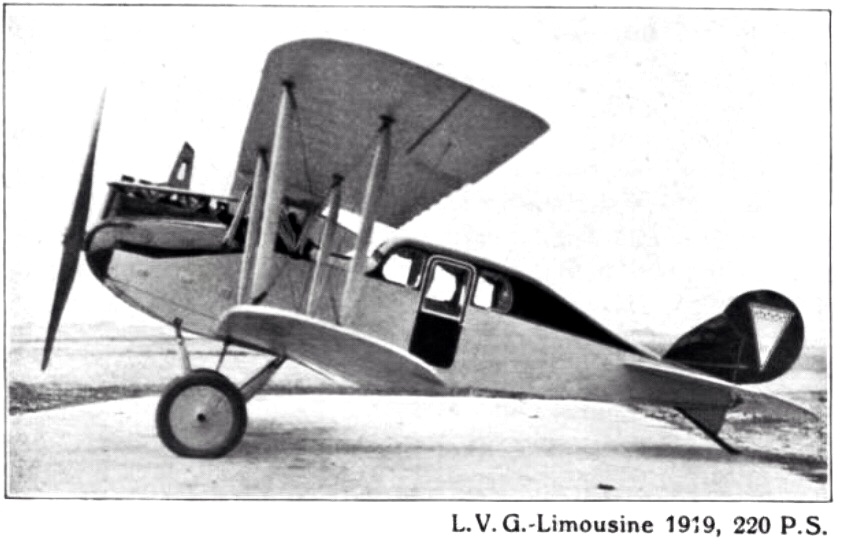
LVG 220 hp (1919)

- LVG B.I - reconnaissance and later trainer aircraft
- LVG B.II - reconnaissance and later trainer aircraft
- LVG B.III - trainer aircraft
- LVG C.I - first tandem-seated aircraft with observer-manned machine gun
- LVG C.II - reconnaissance aircraft
- LVG C.IV - reconnaissance aircraft
- LVG C.V - reconnaissance aircraft
- LVG C.VI - more than 1,000 aircraft of this type were produced
- LVG C.VIII - prototype only
- LVG C.IX - not finished
- LVG D 10
- LVG D.II - prototype only
- LVG D.III - prototype only
- LVG D.IV - prototype only
- LVG D.V - prototype only
- LVG D.VI - prototype only
- LVG E.I - experimental aircraft with two machine guns
- LVG G.I - bomber aircraft
- LVG G.II - triplane
- LVG G.III - triplane bomber designed by Schütte-Lanz but built by LVG, the Schütte-Lanz G.V

=== Other aircraft manufactured at LVG ===
- Albatros B.II
- Albatros C.II
- Gotha G.IV
- Sablatnig SF 5
