= LVG G.I =

G.I
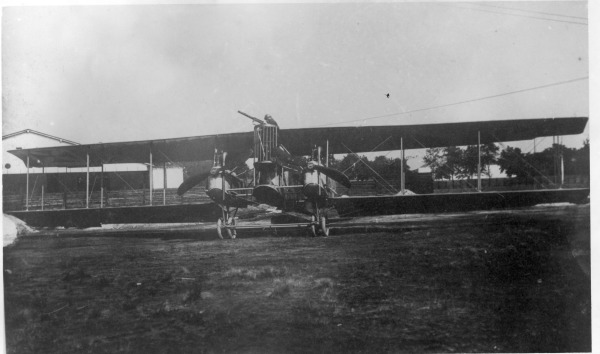

General information
- Type: Heavy bomber
- National origin: Germany
- Manufacturer: LVG (Luftverkehrsgesellschaft m.b.H.)
- Designer: Schütte-Lanz
- Number built: 3

History
- First flight: 1915

The LVG G.I, (company designation KD.VII), was a prototype German bomber aircraft built by LVG during World War I.

== Design ==
The LVG G.I was a three-seat biplane equipped with two 150 hp (110 kW) Benz Bz.III engines driving handed propellers. LVG designed it as a heavy bomber under the brand designation KD.VII. Three aircraft were built, two of which were lost in accidents and the third being transferred to Idflieg in late 1916. Despite being stationed in Lance, France, the third G.I was awkward and the pilots refused to fly it. One test flight in spring 1917 ended in mishap, and the Luftstreitkräfte refused to order the G.I into production.

== Bibliography ==
- Herris, Jack (2016). LVG Aircraft of WWI: Volume 3: C.VI–C.XI & Fighters: A Centennial Perspective on Great War Airplanes. Great War Aviation Centennial Series. Vol. 36. Charleston, South Carolina: Aeronaut Books. ISBN 978-1-935881-74-2.
