= DFW C.V =

1916 German reconnaissance aircraft family

C.IV, C.V, C.VI, and F 37
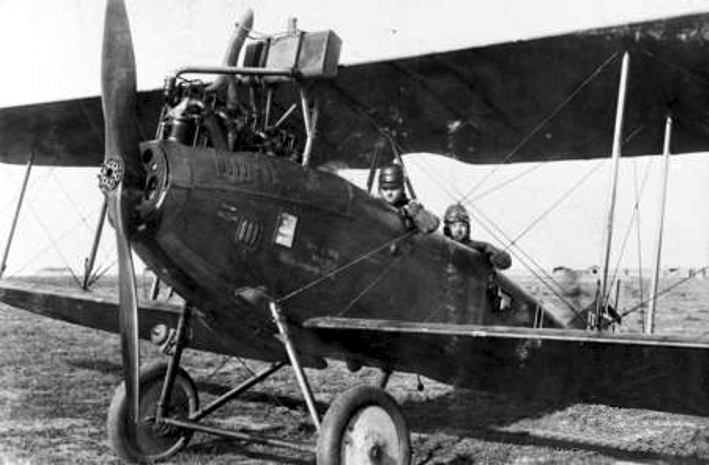
- A DFW C.V and its crew, probably of Bayrische Flieger Abteilung 287 (Bavarian Flying Section 287), 1918

General information
- Type: Reconnaissance
- National origin: German Empire
- Manufacturer: Aviatik
- Designer: Deutsche Flugzeugwerke
- Primary user: Luftstreitkräfte
- Number built: 3250

History
- Manufactured: 1916-1918
- Introduction date: 1916
- First flight: 1916

The DFW C.IV, DFW C.V, DFW C.VI, and DFW F37 were a family of German reconnaissance aircraft first used in 1916 in World War I. They were conventionally configured biplanes with unequal-span unstaggered wings and seating for the pilot and observer in tandem, open cockpits. Like the DFW C.II before them, these aircraft seated the gunner to the rear and armed him with a machine gun on a ring mount. Compared to preceding B- and C-class designs by DFW, however, the aerodynamics of the fuselage were more refined, and when coupled with more powerful engines, resulted in a machine with excellent performance.

== Design and development ==
The C.IV had a single-bay wing cellule and was powered by a 112 kW (150.19 hp) Benz Bz.III. It was soon replaced in production by the definitive C.V with a two-bay wing cellule and either a 185 hp (137.95 kW) C.III N.A.G. or 149 kW (199.81 hp) Benz Bz.IV. Predictably, the more powerful Benz engine gave significantly better performance.

The C.V's main designer was Heinrich Oelerich, and it was produced in larger numbers than any other German aircraft during World War I. About 2000 were manufactured by DFW and about 1,250 licence manufactured by Aviatik (initially as the Aviatik C.VI, but later as the DFW C.V(Av)), Halberstadt, LVG, and Schütte-Lanz.

A further development was the C.VI, a sturdier aircraft with balances added to the ailerons. Only a single example of this was built, but it was followed by three aircraft designated F37 in the closing stages of the war, which may have received the Idflieg designation DFW C.VII, though this is not certain. Following the war, the DFW F37 was fitted with the 220 kW (295.02 hp) BMW IV engine, and in this configuration broke the world altitude record in 1919, reaching a height of 7,700 m (25,262.47 ft). However, since this flight was in breach of the Armistice, it was not recognised by the FAI. After this exploit, this F37 had its original Benz engine restored, and was converted into a passenger "limousine" by the addition of a richly upholstered interior and a canopy to enclose it. Now designated the DFW P1 Limousine, it could carry three passengers and was demonstrated by DFW at the ELTA exhibition in Amsterdam in 1919, flying passengers.

== Description ==
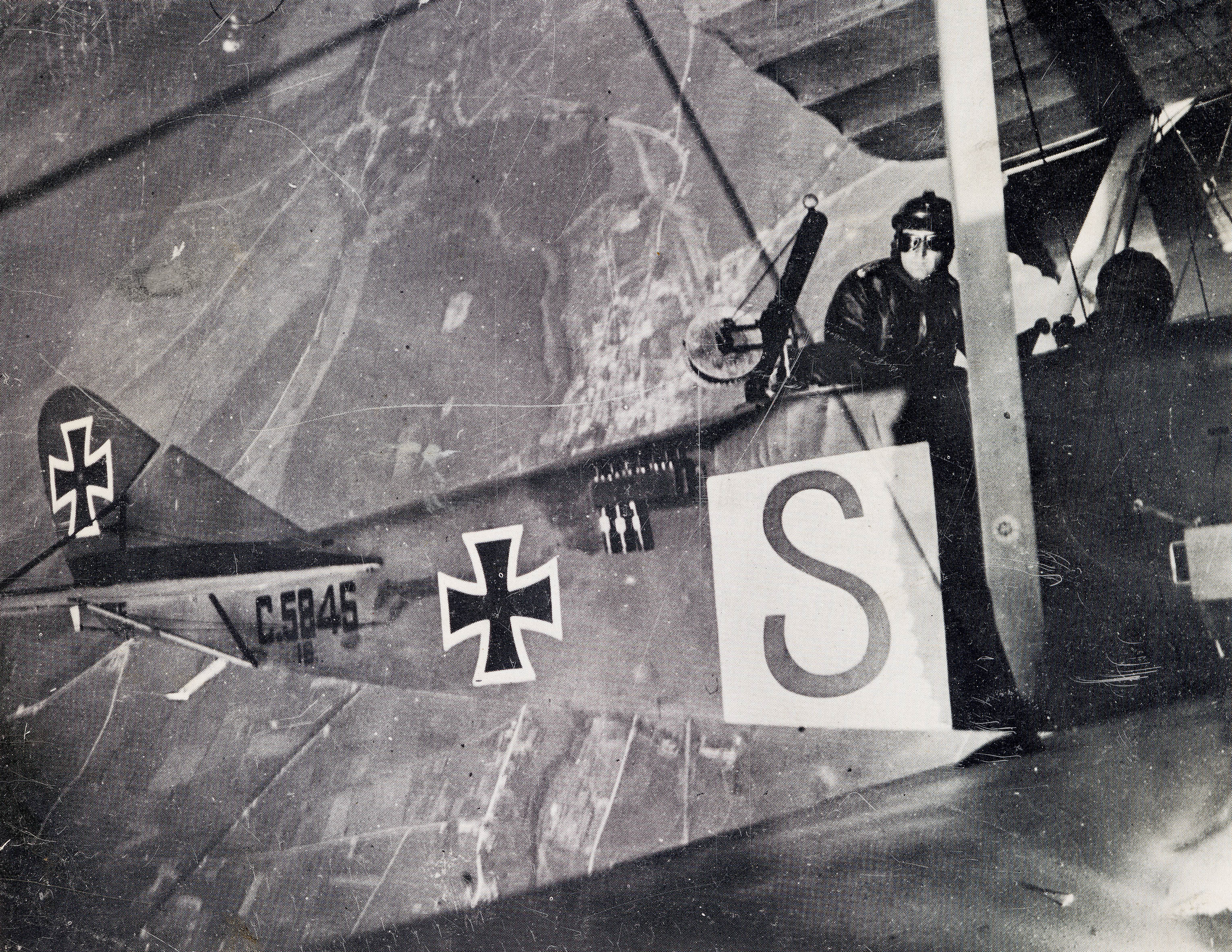
DFW C.V (s/n 5845/16) banking in early morning sunlight. Note the Aviatik trademark on strut, and flares in holder behind observer's cockpit

The C.V was a biplane of mixed, mostly wooden construction. The fuselage was a wooden frame, covered with plywood, with a tail consisting of a metal frame, covered with canvas. The wings were of two-spar wooden construction, rectangular in shape and covered in canvas. The upper wing had a slighter greater span and was fitted with ailerons. The conventional landing gear was fixed, with a straight common axle and a rear skid.

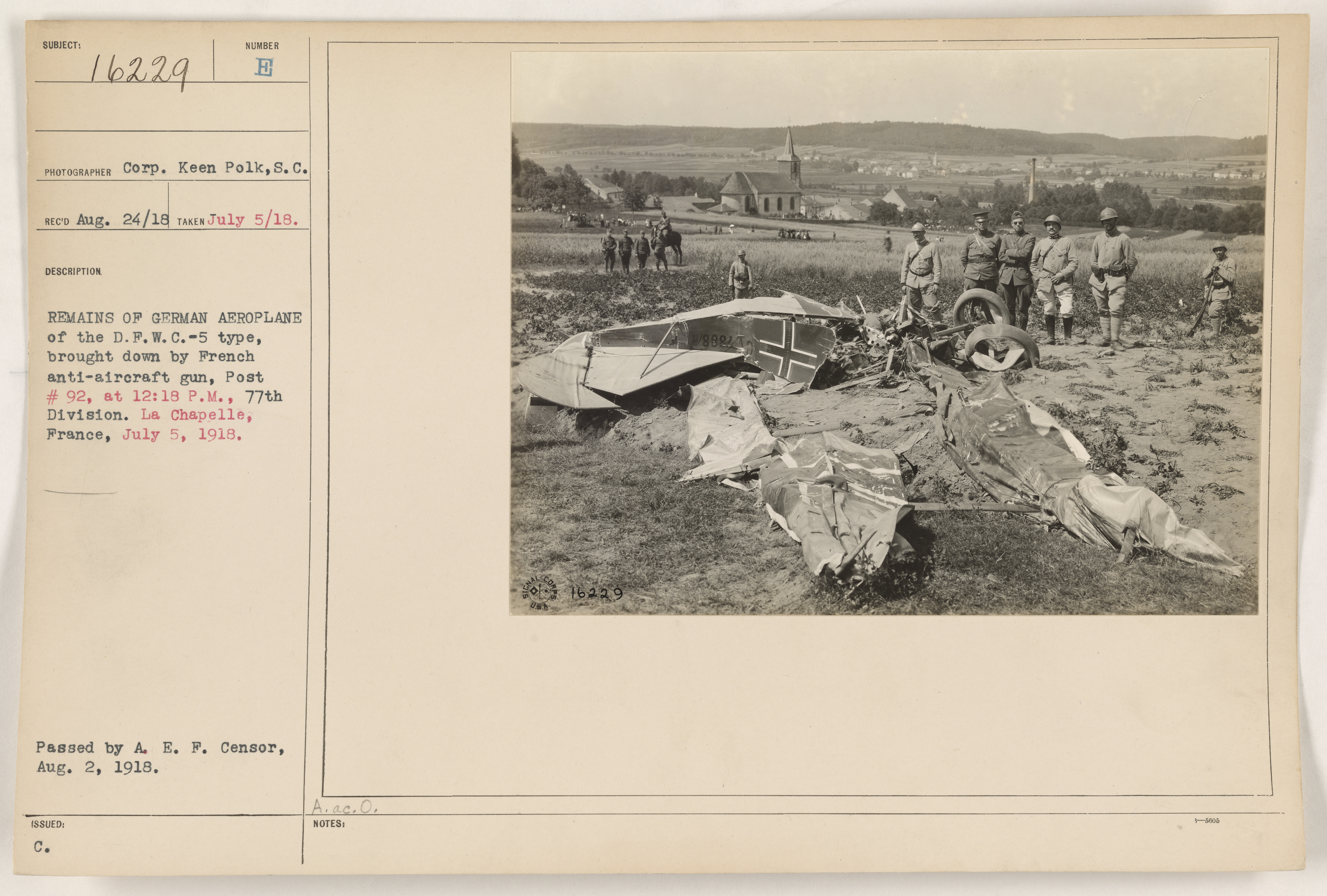
DFW CV.7888/17. Shot down by French anti-aircraft fire near La Chapelle

The straight-six engine was fitted with a long, vertical, chimney-like exhaust pipe (LVG-produced planes had horizontal exhaust pipe) and was covered with an aerodynamic cover, but these were often left off. The engine drove a two-blade wooden propeller 2.8 metres (9.2 ft) in diameter. Engine cooling was initially provided by radiators on each side of the fuselage, later aircraft used a radiator at the front of the upper wing.

== Operational history ==
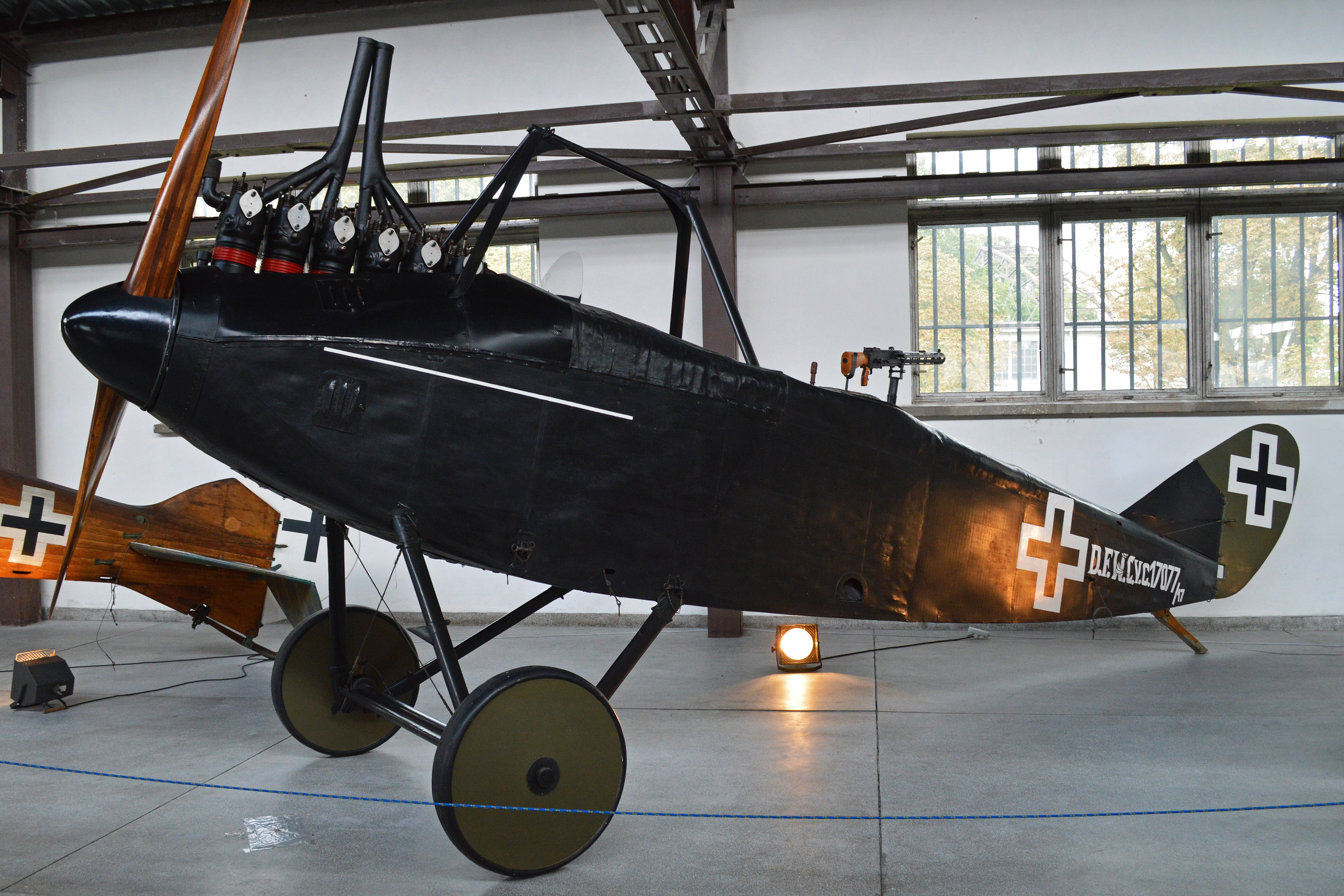
The aircraft at the Polish Aviation Museum, Kraków (2013)

The C.V and its related designs were used as a multi role combat aircraft, for reconnaissance, observation, and bombing by Germany and Bulgaria during World War I. Six aircraft were delivered to Bulgaria in 1917. In the hands of a skilled pilot it could outmaneuver most allied fighters of the period. It remained in service until early 1918 though 600 were still in use by the Armistice of 11 November 1918. Most were thereafter scrapped according to the Treaty of Versailles in 1919.

Poland seized 11 aircraft in 1919 and manufactured further 13 in 1920 from seized parts. Several other C.Vs were bought in 1920. They were used by the Polish Air Force in the Polish-Soviet war.

Two were used post-war in Finland, four in the Netherlands, two in Switzerland, five (plus one made from spare parts) in Lithuania and a number in Estonia. Eight aircraft were converted for civilian use and used by Deutsche Luft Rederei. Seven copies were built by the Darzhavna Aeroplanna Rabotilnitsa (Bulgarian state aircraft workshops) in 1925 as the DAR Uzunov-1 (DAR U-1) and used as a trainer for Bulgaria's secret air force.

Only one fuselage of a C.V(Av) survives in the Polish Aviation Museum in Kraków.

== Operators ==
German Empire

- Luftstreitkräfte
- Kaiserliche Marine

Kingdom of Bulgaria

- Bulgarian Air Force

Post-War Operators:

Poland

- Polish Air Force operated up to 34 aircraft.

Estonia

- Estonian Air Force operated four DFW C.V aircraft.

Finland

- Finnish Air Force
  - 2 x DFW C.V (T29)

Latvia

- Latvian Air Force

Lithuania

- Lithuanian Air Force operated 7 DFW C.V aircraft (No. 7, 3379, 3918, 4828, 5044, 9076, 17243)

Ukraine

- Ukrainian People's Republic Air Fleet

== Variants ==
DFW C.IV
The first of a line of reconnaissance aircraft from DFW, powered by a 112 kW (150 hp) Benz Bz.III.
DFW C.V
The major production version with thousands built by DFW and many more by sub-contractors. Power could be supplied by a 112 kW (150.19 hp) C.III N.A.G. (licence-built Conrad C.III) or 149 kW (200 hp) Benz Bz.IV
DFW C.V(Av)
Later designation for aircraft built by Automobil und Aviatik A.G in Germany
DFW C.VI
A single prototype with aerodynamic aileron balances and strengthened structure, powered by a 164 kW (220 hp) Benz Bz.IVa
DFW F37
The company designation for further development of the C.VI, not ordered by Idflieg due to the Armistice, fitted with a 220 kW (300 hp) BMW IV engine.
DFW P1 Limousine
A single conversion of an F37 with an expensively upholstered limousine style cabin behind the cockpit.
Aviatik C.VI
The initial designation for those C.Vs built by Aviatik until Idflieg rationalized its designation system and changed it to DFW C.V(Av)
DAR Uzunov-1 or DAR U-1
C.V aircraft built in Bulgaria by DAR, (Darzhavna Aeroplane Robotilnitsafor - Bulgarian state aircraft workshops), for the Bulgarian Air Service

== Specifications (DFW C.V) ==
Data from German Aircraft of the First World War

General characteristics

- Crew: 2
- Length: 7.875 m (25 ft 10 in)
- Wingspan: 13.27 m (43 ft 6 in)
- Height: 3.25 m (10 ft 8 in)
- Empty weight: 970 kg (2,138 lb)
- Gross weight: 1,430 kg (3,153 lb)
- Powerplant: 1 × Benz Bz.IV 6-cyl. water-cooled in-line piston engine, 150 kW (200 hp) or 185 hp (138 kW) C.III N.A.G.

Performance

- Maximum speed: 155 km/h (96 mph, 84 kn)
- Endurance: 3½
- Service ceiling: 5,000 m (16,000 ft)
- Rate of climb: 1.27 m/s (250 ft/min)
- Time to altitude: 1,000 m (3,300 ft) in 4 min, 5,000 m (16,000 ft) in 49 min

Armament

- Guns:
- 1 × 7.92 mm MG08/15 (Spandau) fixed machine gun with a synchronizing gear
- 1 × 7.92 mm Parabellum MG14 machine gun on a ring mounting
- Bombs:
- 100 kg (220 lb)
