= Conrad C.III =

Aircraft engine

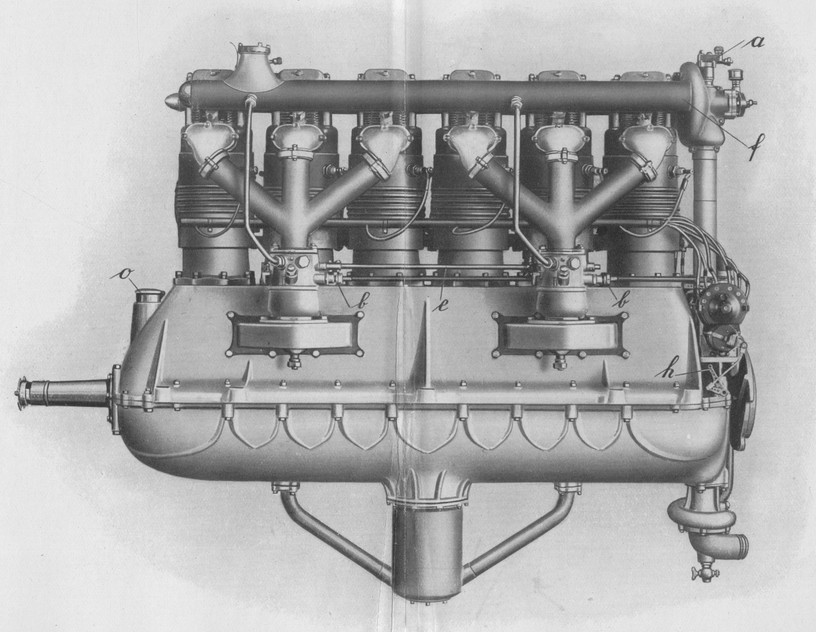
- C III NAG
- Type: Inline engine
- National origin: Germany
- Manufacturer: Nationale Automobil Gesellschaft
- First run: c. 1916
- Major applications: DFW C.Vc, Rumpler C.Ic

The Conrad C.III was a six-cylinder, water-cooled inline aircraft engine designed by Robert Conrad. It was used on some German training aircraft during World War I. The engine was mainly produced under license by the German Nationale Automobil Gesellschaft.

== Development ==
After having designed two aircraft engines for the German Kaiserpreis aircraft engine competition of 1912/13, Robert Conrad prepared an 180 hp (134 kW) six-cylinder aircraft engine for the second Kaiserpreis competition anticipated to take place in 1914–1915. Further improvements on the engine design were done in 1915 by Robert Conrad while he was working for the Deutsche Motorenbau-Gesellschaft. His work resulted in a six-cylinder water-cooled engine with increased bore which was capable of delivering 185 hp (138 kW) at 1400 rpm. After a successful type test in February 1916 the engine was assigned the designation C.III (C for Conrad) by the German military.

Due to insufficient production capacity at the Deutsche Motorenbau-Gesellschaft, the engine was produced by the Nationale Automobil-Gesellschaft (NAG).

After NAG subsequently adapted the engine, it was uprated to 210 hp (157 kW) and successfully type tested in November 1916. The new 210 hp variant however turned out to be unreliable and so subsequent versions of the engine were again rated 185 hp (138 kW), although with various design improvements over the original C.III.

== Variants ==
NAG C.III (C.III Nag b) aircraft engine on display at the Polish Aviation Museum in Kraków

Engine production was undertaken by NAG under license. Despite various adaptions of the original design all variants had the same bore and stroke.

C.III
initial design by Deutsche Motorenbau-Gesellschaft (Conrad), license produced by NAG as C.III Nag.
C.III Nag
initial production variant of the C.III engine, license production by NAG, 185 hp (138 kW), wet-sump lubrication system.
C.III Nag a
improved production variant, 185 hp (138 kW), improvements over the preceding C.III Nag include revised T-shaped intake manifolds and a dry-sump lubrication system with revised oil sump and oil pump.
C.III Nag b
improved production variant, 185 hp (138 kW), improvements over the preceding C.III Nag a include an oil pump fed valvetrain lubrication system, a revised air pump for pressurizing the fuel system and a revised central placement of the two carburettors, along with provisions for mounting a wireless generator on the admission side of the engine.
C.IIIa
adapted and uprated variant of the initial C.III design, 210 hp (157 kW), only small number of engines produced, turned out to be unreliable.
C.IIIb Nag
185 hp (138 kW), no further details given.
C.IIIav Nag
185 hp (138 kW), new design, no further details given.

== Applications ==
The Conrad C.III (Nag) engine was primarily allocated for training machines because it was found to be too heavy for use in fighter aircraft.

- DFW C.Vc (training aircraft)
- Rumpler C.Ic (Germ) (training aircraft, built by Germania Flugzeug-Werke)
- Gotha G.IV (SSW) (training aircraft, built by Siemens-Schuckertwerke)
- LVG D.III (one prototype aircraft built)

== Preserved engines ==
- A preserved NAG C.III engine is on public display at the Polish Aviation Museum in Kraków
- A NAG C.III, serial number 13217, is part of the Museum of Applied Arts & Sciences Barraclough Collection in Sydney
- A preserved NAG C.III engine is part of Capetti's Collection at the Politecnico di Torino

== Specifications (C.III NAG) ==
Data from

=== General characteristics ===
- Type: 6-cylinder, inline, water-cooled, piston engine
- Bore: 138 mm (5.433 in)
- Stroke: 190 mm (7.480 in)
- Displacement: 17.051 L (1,041 cu in)
- Dry weight: 332 kg (732 lb)

=== Components ===
- Valvetrain: One overhead camshaft, driving two inlet and two exhaust valves per cylinder.
- Fuel system: Two Pallas carburetters, each serving three adjacent cylinders. Two spark plugs per cylinder, placed horizontally and opposite each other, supplied by two Bosch ZH 6 magnetos.
- Cooling system: Water-cooled

=== Performance ===
- Power output: 185 hp (138 kW)
- Compression ratio: 4.6 or 4.8 (C III NAG No. 13176)

== See also ==
- List of aircraft engines
