= Jonas Liorentas =

Jonas Liorentas (1 August 1901 in Žvirgždaičiai – 8 July 1991 in Chicago) was a Lithuanian war pilot and officer of the Lithuanian Army.

In 1919 he volunteered into Lithuanian forces to the active combat with the Russian Soviet Army. In 1926 he entered Lithuanian Air Force. After 1943 During German occupation, he became commander of the Lithuanian Liberty Army in Kaunas district. After defeat of German forces by the Soviet forces, he escaped to Switzerland. In 1953 he left to the United States and was active in Lithuanian national organizations.

== Decorations ==
- Knight's Cross of the Order of the Cross of Vytis, 1919
- Knight's Cross of the Order of Vytautas the Great, 1931
- Knight of the Order of the White Lion, 1934
