= Franz Schneider (engineer) =

Swiss aircraft and firearms designer (1871–1941)

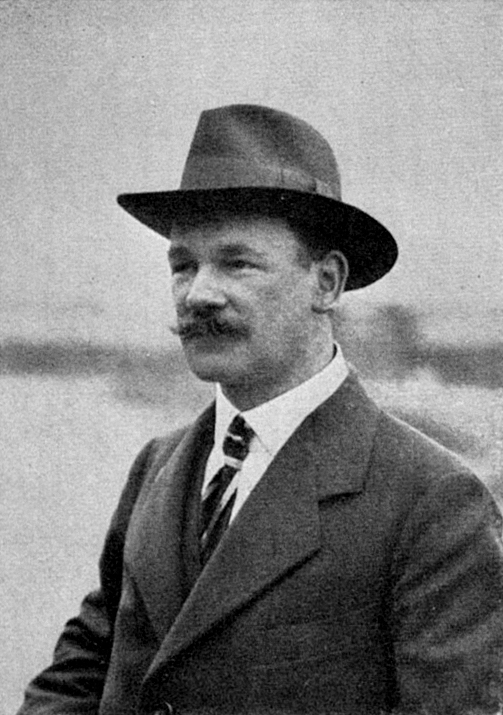
- Franz Schneider, 1915
- Occupation: Engineer
- Known for: Inventing synchronisation device for automatic firearms

Franz Schneider was a Swiss engineer and aircraft designer. Although he designed several aircraft types, initially for the French aircraft manufacturer Nieuport, and later for the German LVG company, he is chiefly remembered for his work in the field of aircraft armament.

Schneider was granted the first patent (on 15 July 1913) for an interrupter gear allowing a machine gun to fire between an aircraft's spinning propeller blades. Full details of Schneider's patent were published in the aviation periodical Flugsport in September 1914 but the Prussian War Ministry chose not to pursue the idea. The concept of interrupter gear in combat aircraft was realised later in World War I by Germany after Anthony Fokker developed the idea.

He also developed the rotating gun turret which was installed on German "C" type World War I aircraft.
