= LVG D.VI =

WWI German prototype fighter aircraft

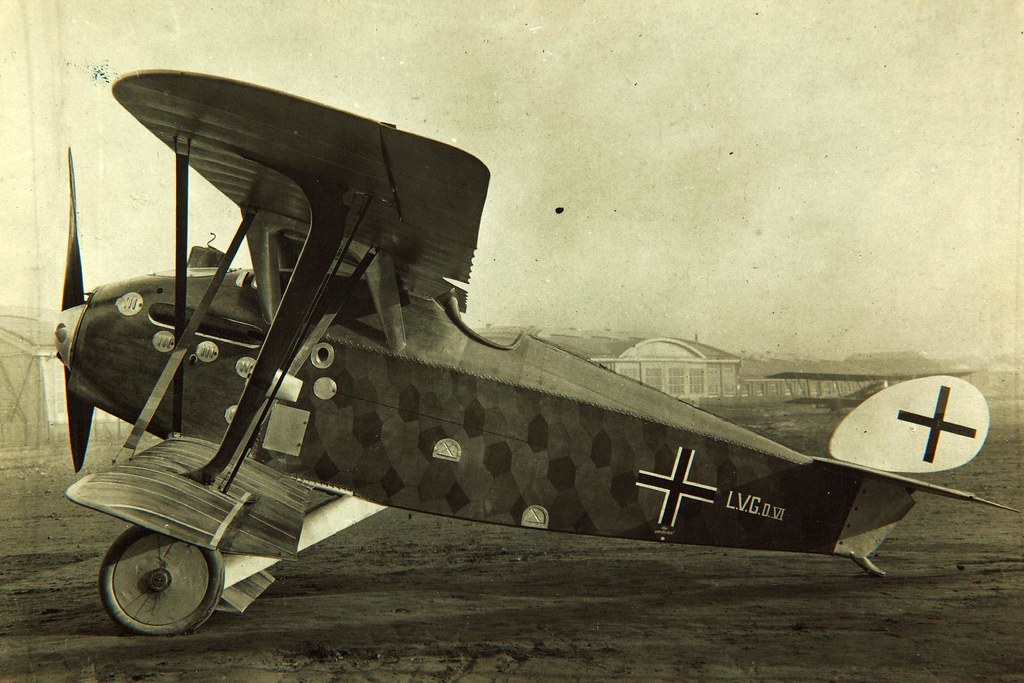

General information
- Type: Fighter
- Manufacturer: Luft Verkehrs Gesellschaft (LVG)
- Number built: 1

History
- First flight: November 1918

The LVG D.VI was a prototype German biplane fighter built by LVG in World War I.

== Design ==
The D.VI was a single-seat biplane fighter which featured a slab-sided plywood-covered fuselage as well as an almond-shaped rudder. Unlike the LVG D.V, the D.VI had more conventional wings, the upper wing being larger and having curved tips and ailerons, and the lower wing being smaller and being swept back. The wings were connected by I struts, with wire cross bracing.

== Specifications ==
General characteristics

- Crew: 1
- Length: 7.2 m (23 ft 7 in)
- Wingspan: 8.8 m (28 ft 10 in)
- Height: 2.9 m (9 ft 6 in)
- Wing area: 18.8 m^{2} (202 sq ft)
- Empty weight: 670 kg (1,477 lb)
- Powerplant: 1 × Benz Bz.IIIbm V-8 water-cooled piston engine, 138 kW (185 hp) -150 kW (200 hp)
- Propellers: 2-bladed fixed-pitch propeller

Performance

- Maximum speed: 198 km/h (123 mph, 107 kn)
- Cruise speed: 170 km/h (110 mph, 92 kn)

Armament

- Guns: 2 × 7.92 mm (0.312 in) LMG 08/15 machine guns
