= LVG C.V =

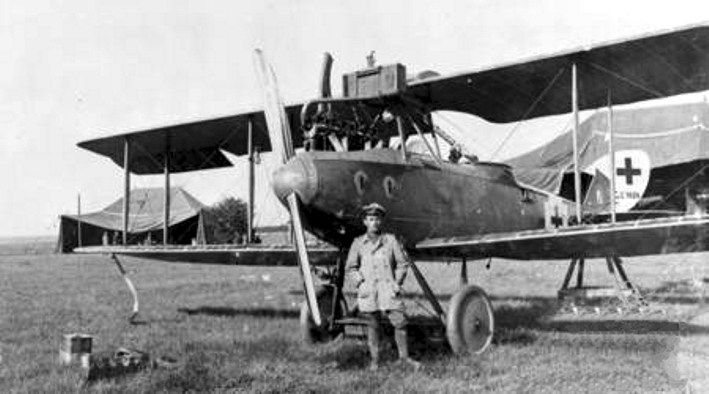

General information
- Type: Reconnaissance aircraft
- National origin: Germany
- Manufacturer: LVG (aircraft manufacturer)

History
- First flight: 1917

The LVG C.V was a reconnaissance aircraft produced in large numbers in Germany during World War I.

== Design and development ==
The C.V was a conventional two-bay biplane design of its day, with unstaggered wings of equal span and tandem, open cockpits for the pilot and observer. The ailerons, fitted only to the upper wing, featured aerodynamic balances that extended past the wingtips. The fuselage was a semi-monocoque construction skinned in wood.

Following the war, some C.Vs were used as civil transports, while some 150 machines captured by Polish forces were put to use by the Polish army. Other post-war users included Russia, Latvia, Lithuania, and Estonia; together operating about 30 aircraft.

== Operators ==
Germany

Luftstreitkrafte

Latvia

Latvian Air Force - Postwar

Lithuania

Lithuanian Air Force (single unit, Msn 9652/18, 3 Sqn.) - Postwar

Poland

Polish Air Force - used as a reconnaissance aircraft during Polish–Soviet War, then in postwar service

Russia

Imperial Russian Air Service - Postwar

Turkey

Ottoman Air Force

== Specifications ==
Data from Grosz 1998, 35

General characteristics

- Crew: Two, pilot and observer
- Length: 8.07 m (26 ft 6 in)
- Wingspan: 13.60 m (44 ft 7 in)
- Height: 3.36 m (10 ft 0 in)
- Wing area: 40.5 m^{2} (436 sq ft)
- Empty weight: 1,009 kg (2,220 lb)
- Gross weight: 1,505 kg (3,311 lb)
- Powerplant: 1 × Benz Bz.IV , 150 kW (200 hp)

Performance

- Maximum speed: 170 km/h (106 mph, 92 kn)
- Endurance: 3 hours 30 minutes
- Service ceiling: 6,500 m (21,300 ft)
- Rate of climb: 5.6 m/s (1,100 ft/min)

Armament

- 1 × fixed, forward-firing 7.92 mm (.312 in) LMG 08/15
- 1 × trainable, rearward-firing 7.92 mm (.312 in) Parabellum MG14
- 40 kg (90 lb) bombs
