= Žvirgždaičiai =

- Town
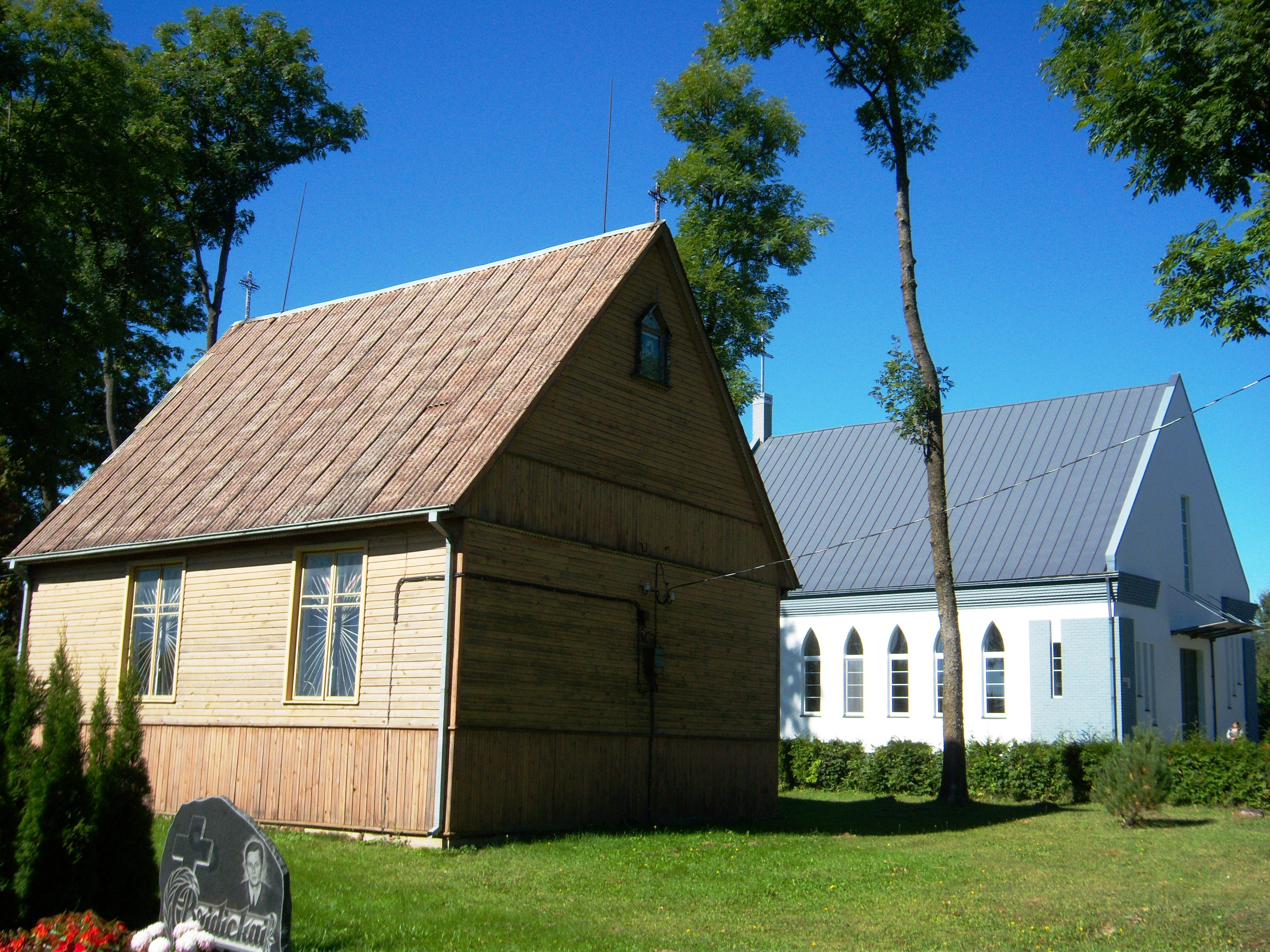
- Old and new churches in Žvirgždaičiai

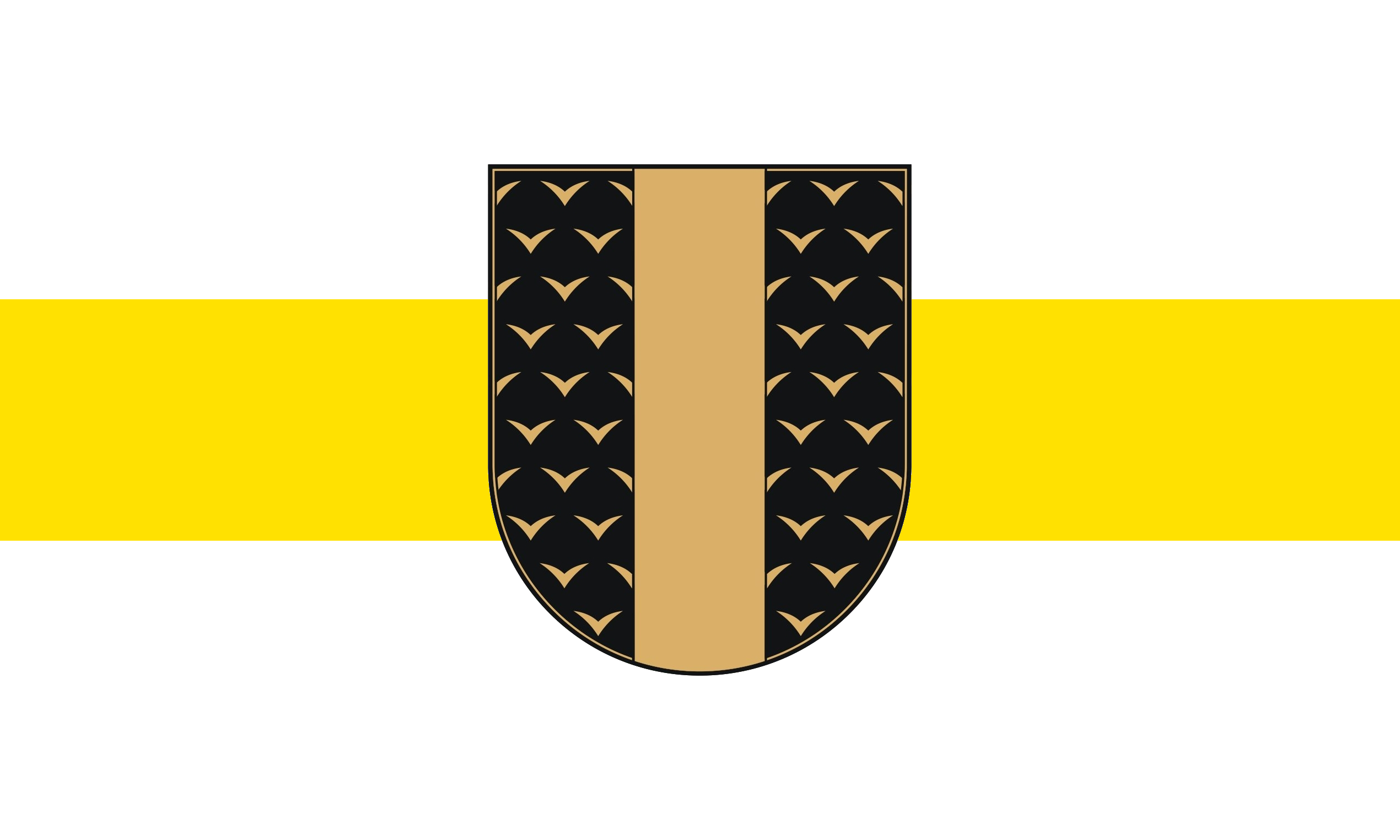
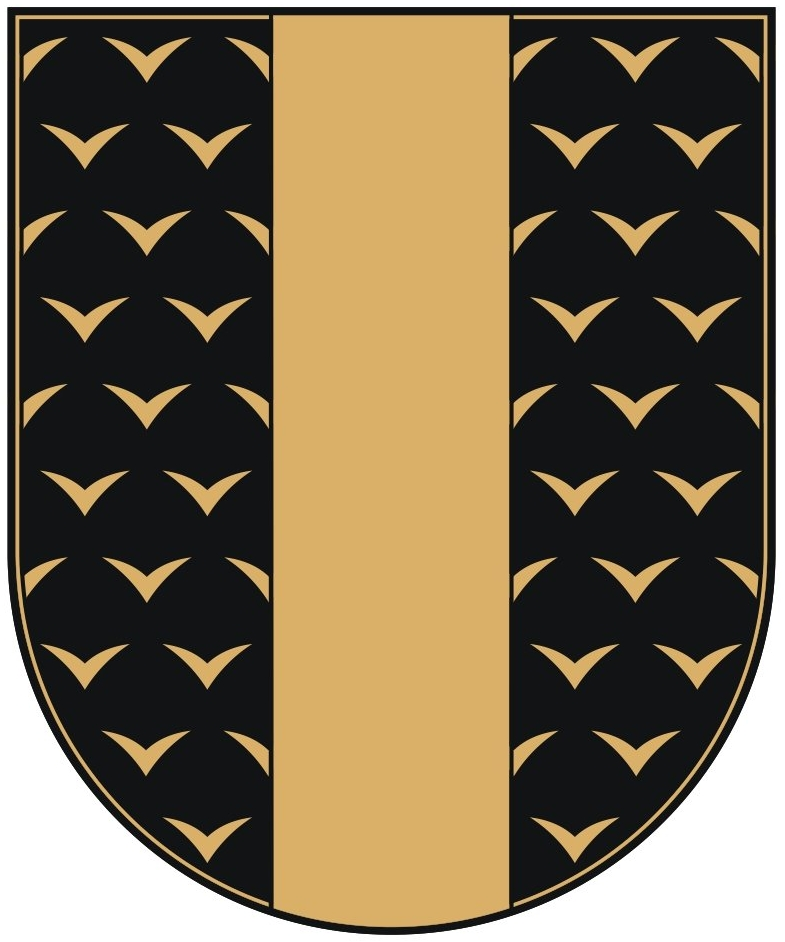
- Flag Coat of arms

- Location within Lithuania
- Coordinates: 54°47′40″N 23°02′00″E
- Country: Lithuania
- County: Marijampolė County

Population (2011)
  - Total: 242
- Time zone: UTC+2 (EET)
  - Summer (DST): UTC+3 (EEST)

Žvirgždaičiai is a small town in Marijampolė County, in southwestern Lithuania. According to the 2011 census, the town has a population of 242 people.
