= LVG D.IV =

WWI German fighter aircraft

General information
- Type: Fighter
- Manufacturer: LVG
- Number built: 2

The LVG D.IV was a German fighter plane built by LVG in World War I.

== Design ==
The D.IV was similar to the D.III in having a plywood covered semi-monocoque fuselage, but the 195hp Benz Bz IIIb V-8 direct drive engine allowed for a cleaner nose than the NAG C III engine of the D.III. It retained the single axle main undercarriage of the D.III and had a similar tail structure. The D.IV was a single bay biplane with V struts between the wings. It used landing and flying wires. Both wings were straight edged and equal chord. The upper wing had straight edges, a wider span and wider chord, the lower wing had curved tips. The pilot's cockpit was below the rear half of the upper wing, with a curved cut-out for the pilot.

== Development ==
The first prototype of the D.IV was destroyed in a flight on 5 January 1918, when the crankshaft broke in flight, creating a fire. The second prototype made it to the first of the D-type fighter competitions at Adlershof, but was lost on 29 January 1918 when the engine caught fire, destroying the aircraft. Because both prototypes were destroyed in crashes, the D.IV program was axed.

== Specifications ==
Data from German Aircraft of the First World War

General characteristics

- Crew: 1
- Length: 6.28 m (20 ft 7 in)
- Wingspan: 8.5 m (27 ft 11 in)
- Height: 2.7 m (8 ft 10 in)
- Wing area: 18.06 m^{2} (194.4 sq ft)
- Empty weight: 680 kg (1,499 lb)
- Gross weight: 935 kg (2,061 lb)
- Powerplant: 1 × Benz Bz.IIIb V-8 water-cooled piston engine, 145 kW (195 hp)

Performance

- Maximum speed: 180 km/h (110 mph, 97 kn)
- Cruise speed: 155 km/h (96 mph, 84 kn)
- Time to altitude: 5,000 m (16,000 ft) in 28 minutes at 911 kg (2,008 lb)

Armament

- Guns: 2 × 7.92 mm (0.312 in) machine guns

== Bibliography ==
- Herris, Jack (2019). LVG Aircraft of WWI: Volume 3: C.VI–C.XI & Fighters: A Centennial Perspective on Great War Airplanes. Great War Aviation Centennial Series. Vol. 36. Charleston, South Carolina: Aeronaut Books. ISBN 978-1-935881-74-2.
