= LVG B.I =

German reconnaissance biplane

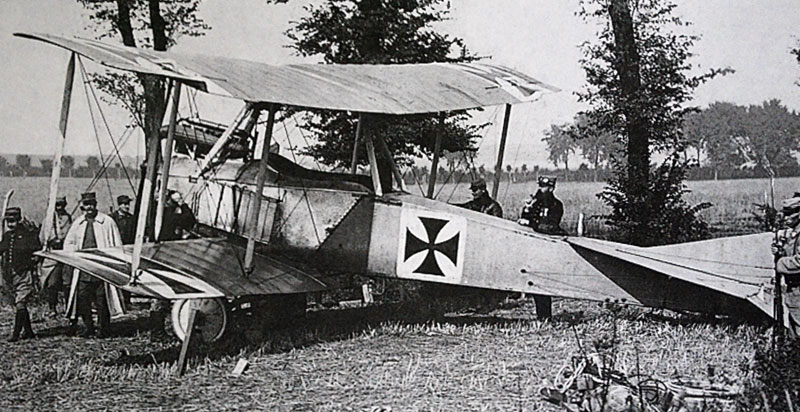

General information
- Type: Two-seat reconnaissance biplan
- National origin: Germany
- Manufacturer: Luft-Verkehrs-Gesellschaft
- Primary user: Luftstreitkräfte

The LVG B.I was a 1910s German two-seat reconnaissance biplane designed by Luft-Verkehrs-Gesellschaft for the Luftstreitkräfte.

== Development ==
LVG had been involved in the operation of dirigibles before it started design, in 1912, of the company's first original design, the B.I. The B.I was an unequal-span two-seat biplane with a fixed tailskid landing gear. It was powered by a nose-mounted 80 kW (100 hp) Mercedes D.I engine. After entering service an improved variant, the B.II was developed with a cut-out in the upper wing to improve visibility for the pilot in the rear cockpit to help spot ground infantry and fitted with a 90 kW (120 hp) Mercedes D.II engine. The B.II entered service in 1915 and although mainly used as a trainer it was also used for unarmed reconnaissance and scouting duties. A further variant was the B.III which had structural strengthening to allow it to be used as a trainer.

The Euler company built the B.I and B.II under license as the Euler B.I and Euler B.II respectively. The B.III was likewise built under license by Euler as the Euler B.III.

== Variants ==
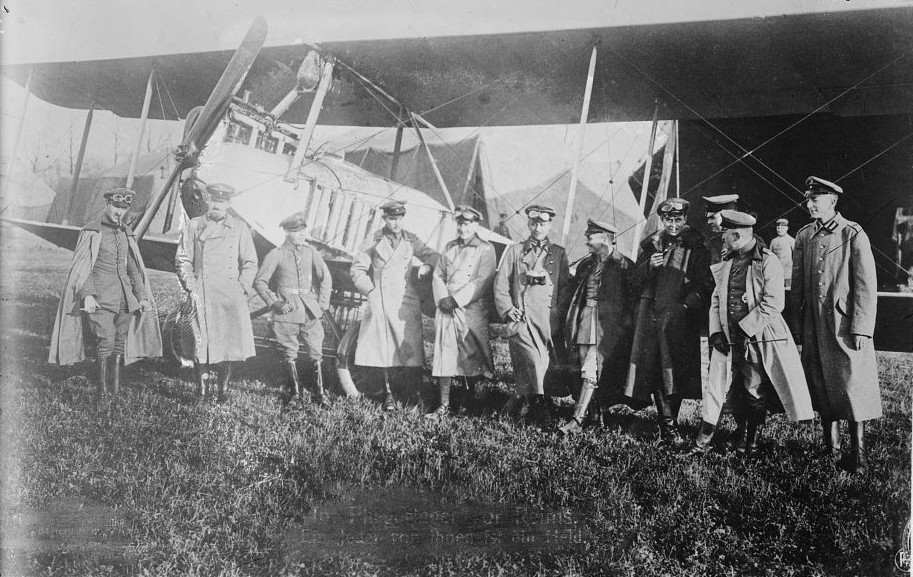
German pilots in front of an LVG B.I on the western front

- B.I - Production variant powered by an 80 kW (100 hp) Mercedes D.I engine.
  - Otto B.I/LVG B.I(Ot) - Otto-built B.I.
- B.II - Improved variant powered by a 90 kW (120 hp) Mercedes D.II engine.
  - Lebedev IX - Captured B.II rebuilt by Lebed and supplied to the Imperial Russian Air Force
- B.III - Training variant with strengthened structures.

== Operators ==
Bulgaria

- Bulgarian Air Force

Denmark

- Royal Danish Air Force

German Empire

- Luftstreitkrafte

Turkey

- Ottoman Air Force

== Specifications (B.I) ==
Data from

General characteristics

- Crew: 2 (pilot, observer)
- Length: 8.30 m (27 ft 2.75 in)
- Wingspan: 12.12 m (39 ft 9.25 in)
- Height: 2.95 m (9 ft 8.25 in)
- Wing area: 35.40 m^{2} (381.05 sq ft)
- Empty weight: 726 kg (1,600 lb)
- Gross weight: 1,075 kg (2,370 lb)
- Powerplant: 1 × Mercedes D.I inline piston engine , 75 kW (100 hp)

Performance

- Maximum speed: 105 km/h (65 mph, 56 kn)
- Endurance: 4 hours 0 minutes

== See also ==
Related lists

- List of military aircraft of Germany
