= LVG D.II =

WWI German fighter aircraft

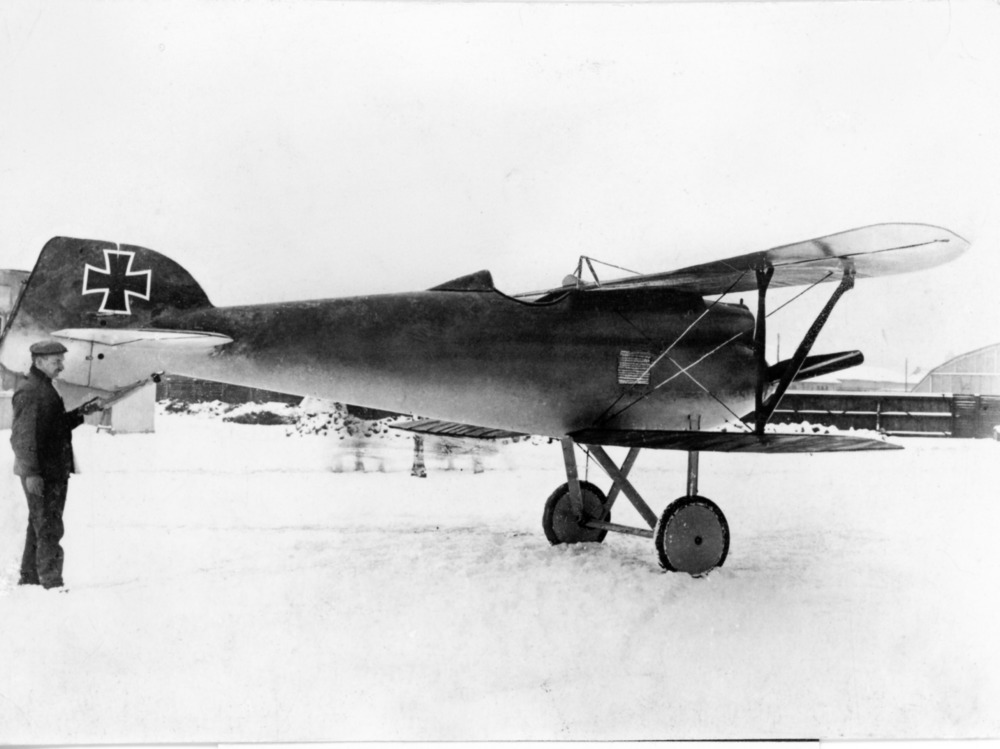

General information
- Type: Fighter
- Manufacturer: LVG
- Number built: 1

History
- First flight: 1916

The LVG D.II (company designation D 12) was a German fighter plane built by LVG in World War I. It originally flew in 1916, but was damaged during flight tests and never saw production.

== Design ==
The D.II was a single-seat biplane fighter with wings of unequal span and a plywood covered semi-monocoque fuselage as seen on the earlier D.10 prototype fighter. V struts connected the wings, and the fuselage occupied the gap between the wings. The pilot's cockpit was situated just behind the wing's trailing edge, with a small headrest behind it. The D.II also had a cross axle undercarriage.

== Specifications ==
Data from

General characteristics

- Powerplant: 1 × Mercedes D.III 6-cylinder water-cooled in-line piston engine, 120 kW (160 hp)
- Propellers: 2-bladed fixed pitch

Performance

- Maximum speed: 199 km/h (124 mph, 107 kn)

== Bibliography ==
- Herris, Jack (2019). LVG Aircraft of WWI: Volume 3: C.VI–C.XI & Fighters: A Centennial Perspective on Great War Airplanes. Great War Aviation Centennial Series. Vol. 36. Charleston, South Carolina: Aeronaut Books. ISBN 978-1-935881-74-2.
