= LVG D.V =

WWI German fighter aircraft

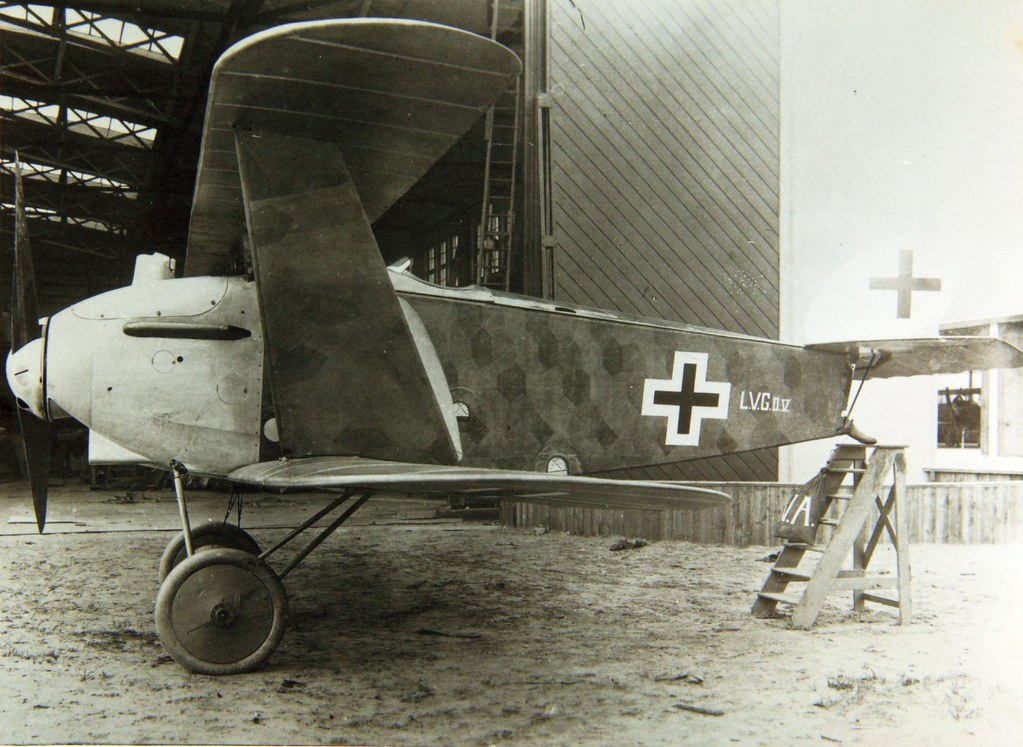

General information
- Type: Fighter
- Manufacturer: LVG
- Designer: Paul Ehrhardt
- Number built: 1

History
- First flight: summer 1918

The LVG D.V was a prototype German biplane fighter built by LVG in World War I.

== Design ==
The D.V was a single-seat biplane fighter which featured a slab-sided plywood-covered fuselage as well as equal span wings, both of which had straight leading edges and rounded tips, but the upper wing chord was shorter, opposite to normal contemporary practice. The rudder was almond-shaped and carried on a tubular spar, with the entire vertical tail moving.

== Development ==
The D.V made its first flight in the summer of 1918. Tests showed it be very fast yet hard to control; at the end of a test flight in July 1918, the D.V, piloted by its designer Paul Ehrhardt, crash-landed and was badly damaged.

== Specifications ==
General characteristics

- Crew: 1
- Length: 7.2 m (23 ft 7 in)
- Wingspan: 9 m (29 ft 6 in)
- Height: 2.9 m (9 ft 6 in)
- Wing area: 19.1 m^{2} (206 sq ft)
- Empty weight: 690 kg (1,521 lb)
- Powerplant: 1 × Benz Bz.IIIbm V-8 water-cooled piston engine, 138 kW (185 hp)

Performance

- Maximum speed: 195 km/h (121 mph, 105 kn)
- Cruise speed: 168 km/h (104 mph, 91 kn)

Armament

- Guns: 2 × 7.92 mm (0.312 in) LMG 08/15 machine guns

== Bibliography ==
- Herris, Jack (2019). LVG Aircraft of WWI: Volume 3: C.VI–C.XI & Fighters: A Centennial Perspective on Great War Airplanes. Great War Aviation Centennial Series. Vol. 36. Charleston, South Carolina: Aeronaut Books. ISBN 978-1-935881-74-2.
