= Ansaldo A.120 =

1925 Italian reconnaissance aircraft

A.120
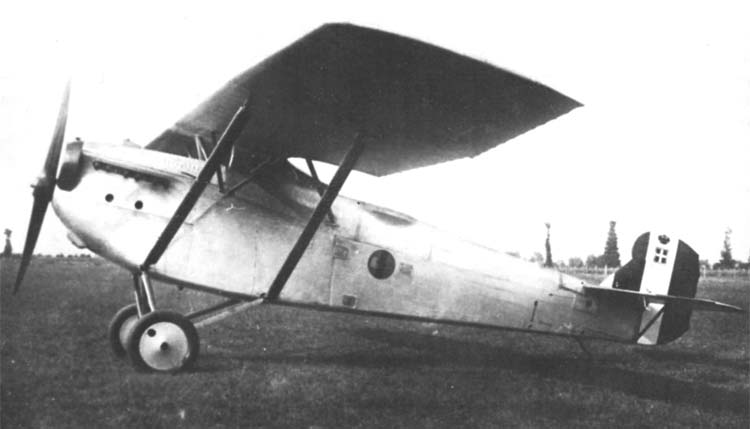

General information
- Type: Reconnaissance aircraft
- Manufacturer: Ansaldo
- Number built: 77

History
- First flight: 1925

The Ansaldo A.120, sometimes called the FIAT A.120 since FIAT (Fabbrica Italiana Automobili Torino - Italian Automobile Factory of Turin) bought Ansaldo, was a reconnaissance aircraft developed in Italy in the 1920s.

== Design and development ==
The A.120 was a conventional, parasol-wing monoplane with fixed tailskid undercarriage which accommodated the pilot and observer in tandem open cockpits. The design was based on a wing developed for the Ansaldo A.115 and the fuselage of the Dewoitine D.1 fighters that Ansaldo had built under licence. The type was operated in modest quantities by the Italian Air Force, and was exported to the air forces of Austria and Lithuania, the latter's machines remaining in service until the Soviet annexation of the country.

== Variants ==
- A.120 - prototype with Lorraine 12Db engine (two built)
- A.120bis - improved version with Fiat A.20 engine
- A.120Ady - definitive production version, most with Fiat A.22 engine (57 built)
- A.120R - revised version for Austrian service (six built)

== Operators ==
Austria

- Austrian Air Force (1927-1938)

Kingdom of Italy

- Regia Aeronautica

Lithuania

- Lithuanian Air Force, 20 aircraft, 1928-1940, 3rd sqn. (Kaunas) 4th sqn. (Kaunas)

== Specifications (A.120Ady) ==
General characteristics

- Crew: Two, pilot and observer
- Length: 8.60 m (28 ft 3 in)
- Wingspan: 12.80 m (42 ft 0 in)
- Height: 2.80 m (9 ft 2 in)
- Wing area: 27.4 m^{2} (295 sq ft)
- Powerplant: 1 × Fiat A.22 piston engine , 410 kW (550 hp)

Performance

- Maximum speed: 254 km/h (158 mph, 137 kn)
- Endurance: 7 hours
- Service ceiling: 7,000 m (23,000 ft)

Armament

- 1 × or 2 × fixed, forward-firing 7.7. mm machine guns
- 1 × trainable, rearward-firing 7.7 mm machine gun for observer.

Note: Lithuanian A.120's had two rear machine guns.

== See also ==
Related lists

- List of Interwar military aircraft

== Bibliography ==
- Taylor, Michael J. H. (1989). Jane's Encyclopedia of Aviation. London: Studio Editions. p. 383.
- Уголок неба
