= List of VTOL aircraft =

List of "VTOL" (Vertical Take-off and Landing) aircraft

This is a list of fixed-wing aircraft capable of vertical take-off and landing arranged under manufacturer. The list excludes helicopters, including compound helicopters and gyrocopters, because they are assumed to have this capability.

For more detail on subtypes of VTOL, see List of tiltrotor aircraft.

== A ==
- AeroVironment SkyTote (tailsitter)
- Armstrong Whitworth AW.171 (ducted fan)
- Avión Torpedo (rocket)
- Avro Canada TS-140 (ducted fan)
- Avro Canada VZ-9 Avrocar (ducted fan)

== B ==
- BAE Harrier II (vectored thrust)
- BAE Sea Harrier (vectored thrust)
- Bell 65 ATV (Tiltjet)
- Bell/Agusta BA609 (tiltrotor), presently known as AgustaWestland AW609
- Bell Boeing Quad TiltRotor (proposal)
- Bell Boeing V-22 Osprey (tiltrotor)
- Bell Eagle Eye (tiltrotor UAV)
- Bell V-280 Valor (tiltrotor)
- Bell X-14 (vectored thrust)
- Bell X-22 (ducted fan)
- Bell XV-3 (first tiltrotor)
- Bell XV-15 (tiltrotor)
- Bensen B-10 (ducted fan)
- Boeing/McDonnell Douglas AV-8 Harrier (vectored thrust)
- Boeing-Vertol VZ-2 (tiltwing)
- Boeing X-32B (vectored thrust)
- Boeing X-50 (stoppable-rotor gyrodyne UAV - failed to achieve forward flight)
- Boulton Paul P.137 VTOL research aircraft
- Boulton Paul P.142 VTOL research aircraft
- British Aerospace P.125

== C ==
- Canadair CL-84 Dynavert (tiltwing)
- Carlson-Lynch Vertipactor
- Chappedelaine LeGyraptere
- Chrysler VZ-6 (ducted fan)
- Colugo Systems-ARcopter (tilt-quadcopter)
- Convair XFY-1 Pogo (tailsitter)
- Curtiss-Wright VZ-7 (flying jeep)
- Curtiss-Wright X-19 (tiltrotor)

== D ==
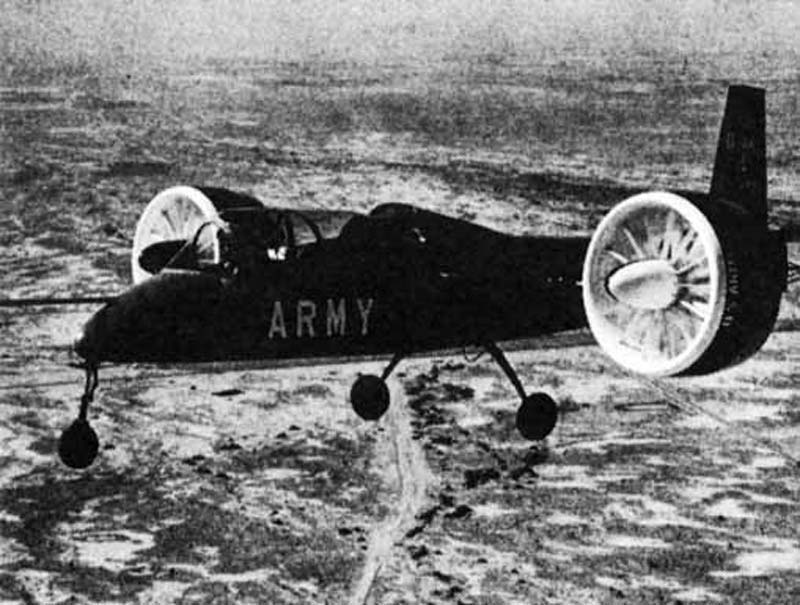
U.S. Army Doak 16/VZ-4DA

- Daimler-Benz VTOL (vectored thrust quadjets)
- Dassault Balzac V (separate lift and thrust engines)
- Dassault Mirage IIIV (separate lift and thrust engines)
- Doak 16/VZ-4DA (ducted fans)
- Dobson Convertiplane (tiltrotor)
- Dornier Do 31 (thrust vectoring and lift jets)
- DuPont Aerospace DP-1 (vectored thrust)

== E ==
- EWR VJ 101 (tiltjets and lift jets)

== F ==
- Fairey Gyrodyne (gyrodyne)
- Fairey Jet Gyrodyne (gyrodyne)
- Fairey Rotodyne (gyrodyne)
- FLUTR model 1 (quadcopter gimbal duct tilt rotor swing wing)
- Focke-Wulf Triebflügel (tailsitter, not built)
- Fokker/Republic D-24 Alliance (mockup only)

== G ==
- Garrett STAMP (vectored thrust)
- Grumman Future Attack Air Vehicle
- Grumman Model 623
- Grumman Nutcracker (tilt-fuselage)

== H ==
- Hawker P.1127 (vectored thrust)
- Hawker Siddeley Harrier (vectored thrust)
- Hawker Siddeley Kestrel (vectored thrust)
- Hawker-Siddeley HS.133
- Hawker-Siddeley HS.138 (ducted fans)
- Hawker-Siddeley HS.145
- Hawker Siddeley P.1017 (cancelled supersonic vectored thrust)
- Hawker Siddeley P.1154 (cancelled supersonic vectored thrust)
- Hawker Siddeley P.1184-16 Dash 18
- Hawker Siddeley P.1217
- Heinkel Lerche (coleopter; not built)
- Hiller VZ-1 Pawnee (ducted fan)
- Hiller X-18 (tiltwing)

== L ==
- Leonardo AW609 (tiltrotor)
- Lockheed Martin F-35B Lightning II (Thrust Vectoring)
- Lockheed XFV-1 "Salmon" (tailsitter)
- Lockheed XV-4 Hummingbird (vectored thrust with entrained air)
- LTV XC-142 (tiltwing)
- Lunar Landing Research Vehicle (gimbaled vertically mounted jet)

== M ==
- Martin Jetpack (portable ducted fans)
- Mayman RAZOR P100 ( turbine VTOL drone)
- McDonnell Douglas AV-8B Harrier II (Tilted output vector and RR vectors)
- McDonnell Douglas MiniCAS (V-tail / Canard proposal)
- Messerschmitt P 1227 (VJ 101B)
- Moller Skycar (vectoring ducted fans)

== N ==
- NASA Puffin (tailsitter proposal)
- Northrop Grumman Tern
- Northrop MRF-54E

== O ==
- Opener BlackFly

== P ==
- Piasecki VZ-8 Airgeep (ducted fans)
- Porter Gyropachute (ducted fan)

== R ==
- Republic AP-100 (ducted fans)
- Rockwell XFV-12 (wing lift augmentation, failed to fly)
- Rolls-Royce Griffith VTOL (separate lift and thrust engines)
- Rolls-Royce Thrust Measuring Rig (vertically mounted jet)
- Rotary Rocket Roton (rotating annular aerospike rotor)
- Ryan X-13 Vertijet (tailsitter)
- Ryan XV-5 Vertifan (liftfans)

== S ==
- Short SC.1 (liftjet and vectored thrust)
- Sikorsky Cypher (ducted fan)
- Sikorsky X-Wing (stoppable rotor; did not fly in this configuration)
- SNECMA Coléoptère (tailsitter)
- SoloTrek XFV (ducted fans)
- Springtail Exoskeleton Flying Vehicle (ducted fans)

== T ==
- Trek Aerospace Dragonfly (ducted fans)

== V ==
- VFW SG 1262 Schwebegestell
- VFW VAK 191B (vectored thrust plus vertical lift)
- Volocopter VoloConnect
- von Braun Interceptor

== W ==
- Williams WASP
- Williams X-Jet (flying platform)

== Y ==
- Yakovlev Yak-141 (liftjet and vectored thrust)
- Yakovlev Yak-36 (vectored thrust)
- Yakovlev Yak-38 (liftjet and vectored thrust)

== Z ==
- Zhuchenko Vertoplan (tiltwing)

== See also ==
- Coleopter
- Compound helicopter
- Gyroplane
- Tiltjet
- Tiltrotor
- Tail-sitter
- Tiltwing
