= Sukhoi Shkval =

Soviet interceptor project

Sukhoi Shkval / Shkval-1

General information
- Type: Interceptor
- National origin: Soviet Union
- Designer: JSC Sukhoi Company Rolan G. Martirosov (Designer)
- Status: Development ceased
- Number built: 0

The Sukhoi Shkval (Russian: Сухой Шквал, lit. 'Dry Squall') was a Soviet project for a tailsitter-type interceptor aircraft.

== History ==
In 1960, a young engineer named Rolan Martirossov began a project with a team of 10 people to create a new type of aircraft—a single-seater, highly capable tailsitter for interception purposes. Initially, the team got permission to work on the project in their spare time. The project was named Shkval-1, and Martirossov became its Chief Designer.

At the time, the Yakovlev Design Bureau was developing Yak-36, while in Britain, the Hawker Siddeley Group was working on the Hawker Siddeley Harrier model. Both designs were equipped with conventional landing gear. The Shkval, however, was designed to take off and land on its tail, similar to the American Lockheed XFV-1. As a result, it required significantly less space.

After drafting the concept and conducting wind tunnel tests at the Central Aerohydrodynamic Institute, Pavel Sukhoi's team received official approval for the project. This approval allowed state funding and access to various experimental facilities. A partial mockup of the aircraft was built.

In August 1963, a commission at the Ministry of Aviation Industry assessed the project. Heated discussions took place, and achievements of the design team were recognised. However, due to the team's failure to comprehensively answer all the commission's questions, funding for the construction of a prototype was denied. Another reason for the denial was the military doctrine advocated by Nikita Khrushchev, which increasingly relied on rockets for attack and defense, significantly reducing expenditures on military aircraft construction.

== Design ==
The Sukhoi Shkval was designed as a twin-engined interceptor equipped with radar, two built-in aircraft guns, and side-by-side afterburner engines.

Two designs were investigated in the wind tunnel, differing only in the shape of the air intakes and the position of the canards. The first concept featured D-shaped air intakes (comparable to those on the Su-15), with canards positioned in front of the cockpit extending to the radome. The second concept had rectangular ramp air inlets (comparable to those on the MiG-25), with canards positioned at the upper side edge of the air inlets. The second design was ultimately favored.

Shkval 's hull was similar to the fuselage of Su-15 but without landing gear, wings, fin, or brake flaps. Four wings were fixed at the corners of the fuselage in a reclining X configuration (comparable to the fictional X-wing fighter from Star Wars). At the ends of these wings were cylindrical containers. The lower parts of these containers contained shock absorbers for take-off and landing, while the remaining parts served as kerosene tanks, as did the wings and fuselage. The containers were externally equipped with guide plates to extend the wings. Each wing had a single flap that functioned as both an aileron and a rudder.

To facilitate vertical landing, the entire ejection seat, along with the thrust lever and the side-stick, were pivotally mounted in the cockpit. This design allowed the pilot's position relative to these controls to remain unchanged regardless of the cockpit's pivot position. The swivel mechanism provided the pilot with a better view of the ground/landing zone through a window in the cockpit floor. The cockpit section of Sukhoi Shkval was built, featuring the ground window and the swivel seat/instrument combination, and this functionality was tested and demonstrated multiple times. Additionally, a two-axle trailer was planned for transporting and erecting Sukhoi Shkval.

== See also ==
- Convair XFY Pogo
- Lockheed XFV
- Rockwell XFV-12
- Heinkel Lerche
- Ryan X-13 Vertijet
- Focke-Wulf Triebflügel
