= Powered lift =

VTOL capable fixed-wing aircraft

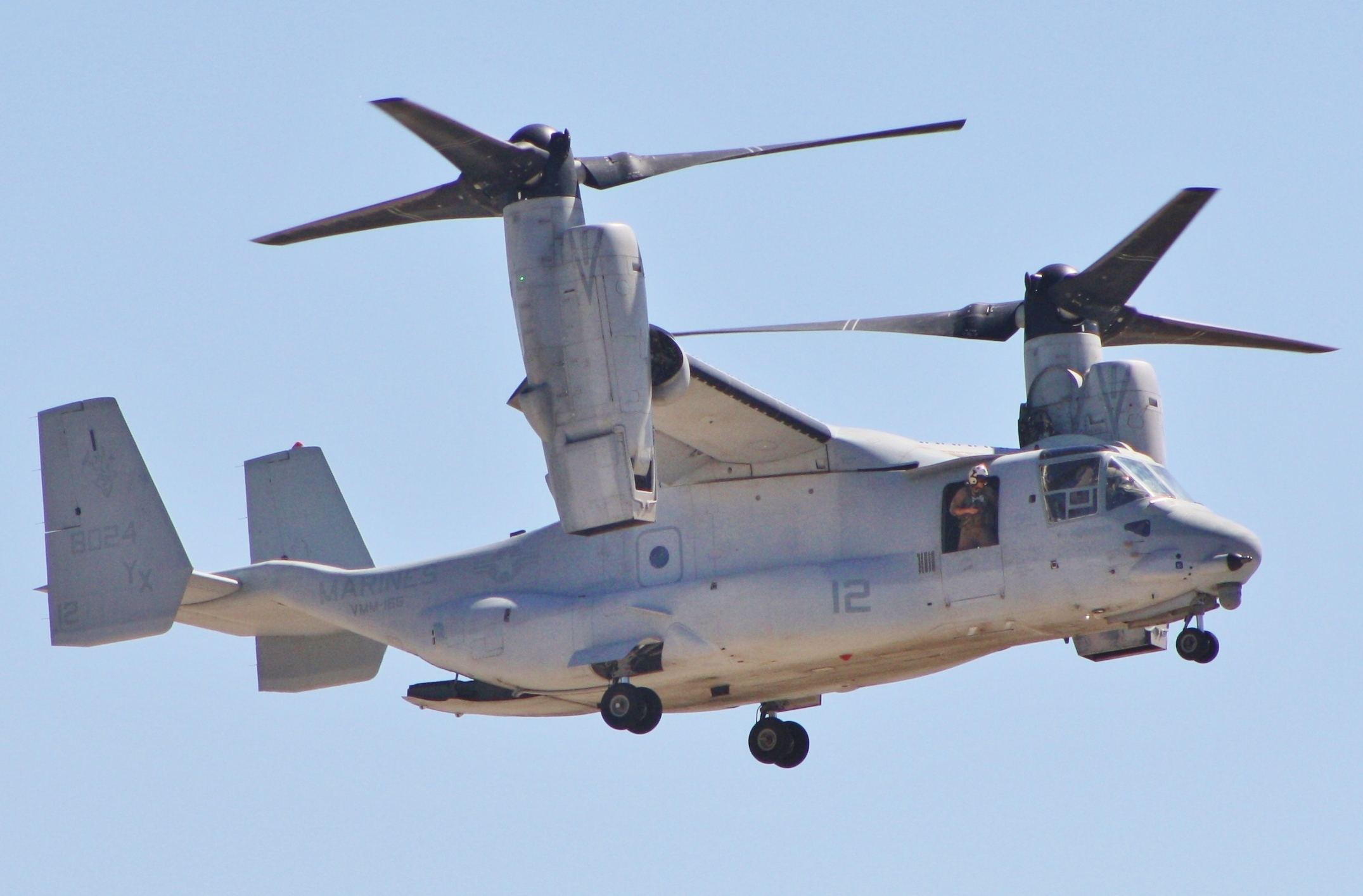
Bell Boeing V-22 Osprey flown by the U.S. Marines

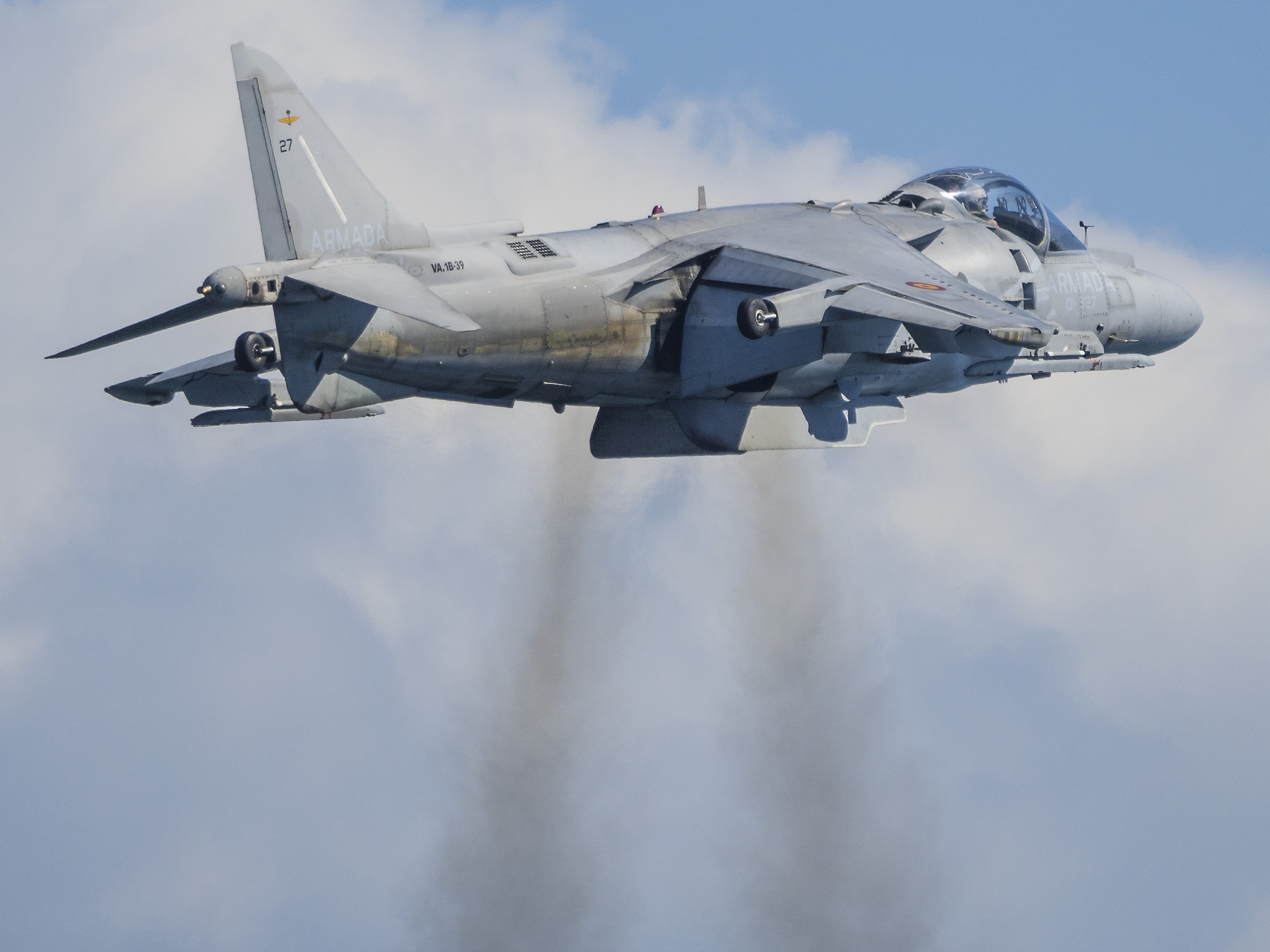
A Spanish Navy EAV-8B Harrier II+

A powered lift aircraft takes off and lands vertically under engine power but uses a fixed wing for horizontal flight. Like helicopters, these aircraft do not need a long runway to take off and land, but they have a speed and performance similar to standard fixed-wing aircraft in combat or other situations.

Some powered-lift aircraft, like the Bell Boeing V-22 Osprey used by the United States Marines, use a tiltrotor or tiltwing. These are called a convertiplane. Others like the British Harrier jump jet use thrust vectoring or other direct thrust techniques.

The first powered-lift ratings on a civilian pilot certificate were issued by the Federal Aviation Administration (FAA) on 21 August 1997 to pilots of Bell Helicopter, Boeing, and the United States Marine Corps. In 2024 FAA established a special class of powered-lift aircraft to certificate them under § 21.17(b) of FAR Part 21 to address certain unique features without applying special conditions or exemptions. The final rule allows for flight training in single control eVTOL aircraft and for issue by the FAA certain deviations in cases of future technological advancements.

== Definition ==
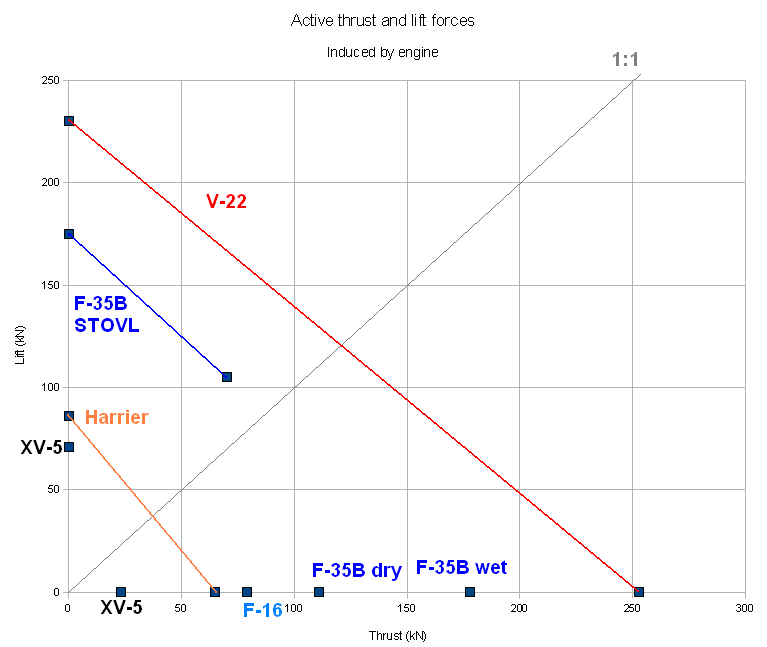
Powered lift and thrust forces of various aircraft

The term is an aircraft classification used by the International Civil Aviation Organization (ICAO) and the United States' FAA:

Powered-lift. A heavier-than-air aircraft capable of vertical take-off, vertical landing, and low-speed flight, which depends principally on engine-driven lift devices or engine thrust for the lift during these flight regimes and on non-rotating aerofoil(s) for lift during horizontal flight.

— ICAO Annex I, Chapter 1.1 Definitions

== Convertiplane ==
A convertiplane uses rotor power for vertical takeoff and landing (VTOL) and converts to fixed-wing lift for normal flight.

In tiltrotor and tiltwing designs such as the Bell Boeing V-22 Osprey, the rotor swings forward to act as a propeller in forward flight. Some designs have a ducted fan design, in which the propeller is surrounded by a large ring-shaped duct to reduce tip losses.

=== Tiltrotor ===
The powered rotors of a tiltrotor (sometimes called proprotor) are mounted on rotating shafts or nacelles at the end of a fixed wing, and used for both lift and propulsion. For vertical flight, the rotors are angled to provide thrust upwards, lifting the way a helicopter rotor does. As the aircraft gains speed, the rotors progressively rotate or tilt forward, with the rotors eventually becoming perpendicular to the fuselage of the aircraft, similar to a propeller. In this mode, the wing provides the lift and the rotor provides thrust. The wing's greater efficiency helps the tiltrotor achieve higher speeds than helicopters.

An important early tiltrotor in the 1950s, was the Bell XV-3, which was one of the first aircraft designs to go from vertical takeoff to horizontal successfully.

The Osprey by Bell Helicopter and Boeing is a twin-engine tiltrotor design that has two turbine engines each driving three-blade rotors. The rotors function similar to a helicopter in vertical flight, and similar to an airplane in forward flight. It first flew on 19 March 1989. The AgustaWestland AW609 (formerly Bell/Agusta BA609) tiltrotor is civilian aircraft based on the V-22 Osprey. The aircraft can take off and land vertically with 2 crew and 9 passengers. The aircraft is expected to be certified in the mid-2020s.

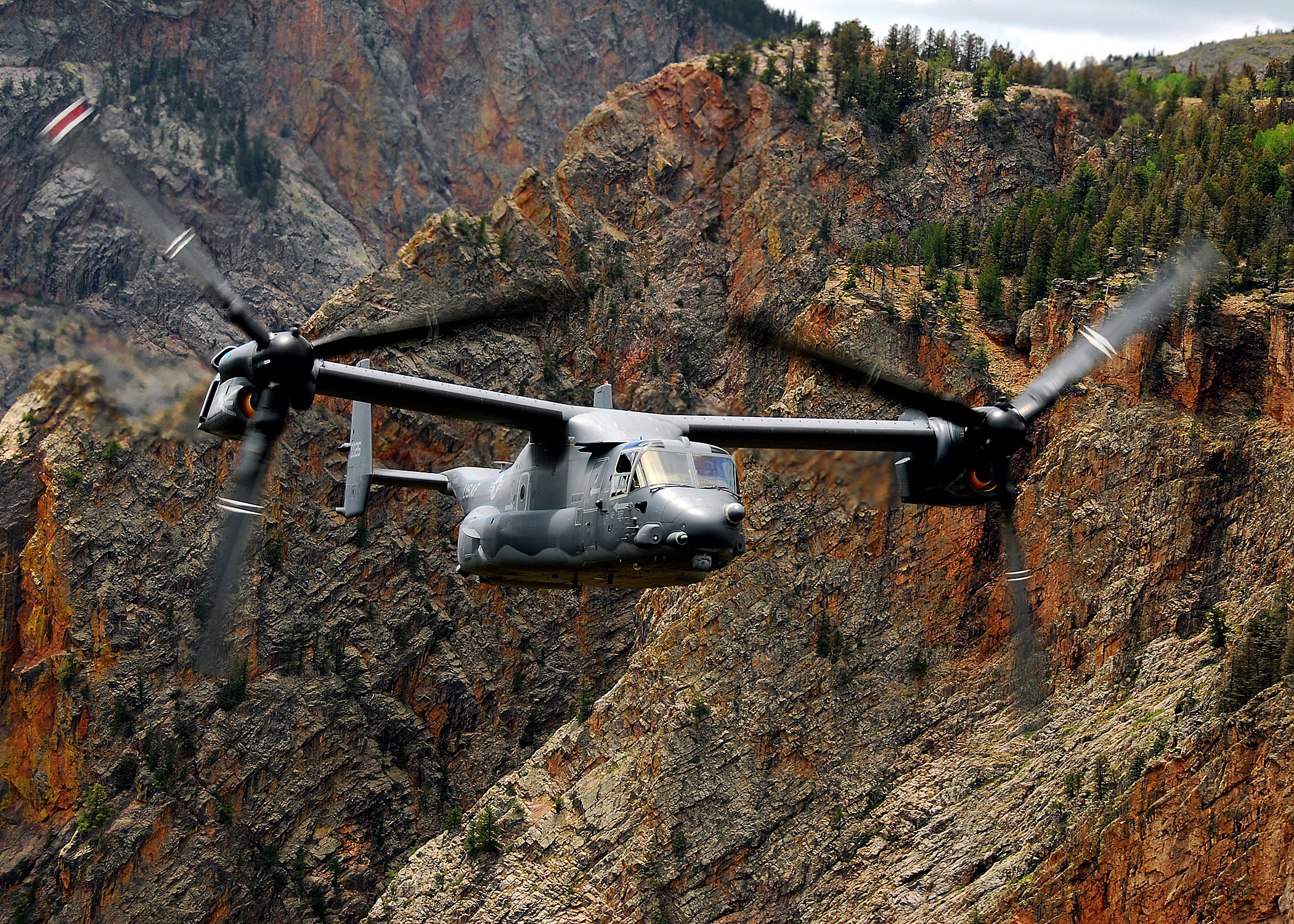
An USAF CV-22 in flight

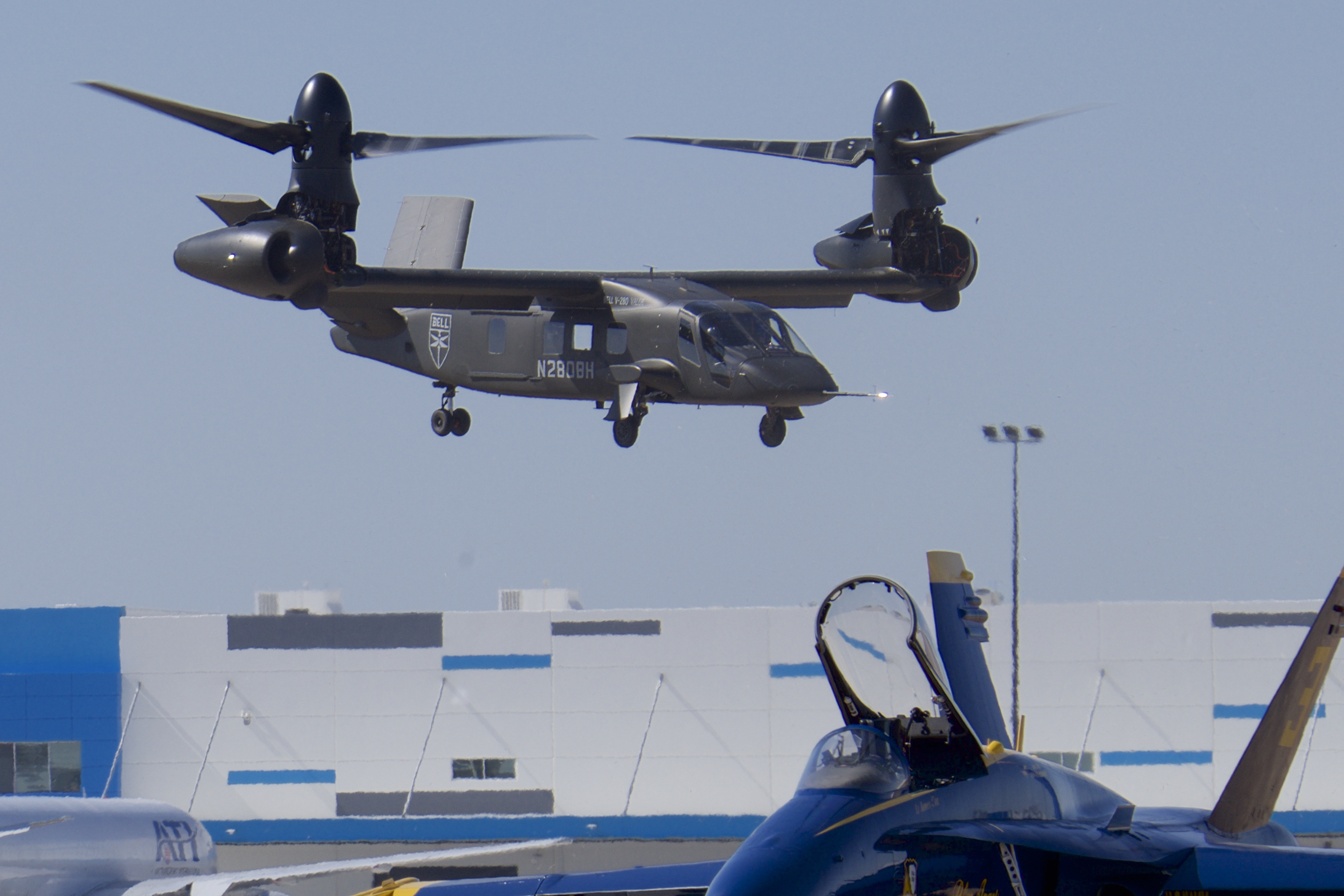
Bell MV-75

=== Tiltwing ===
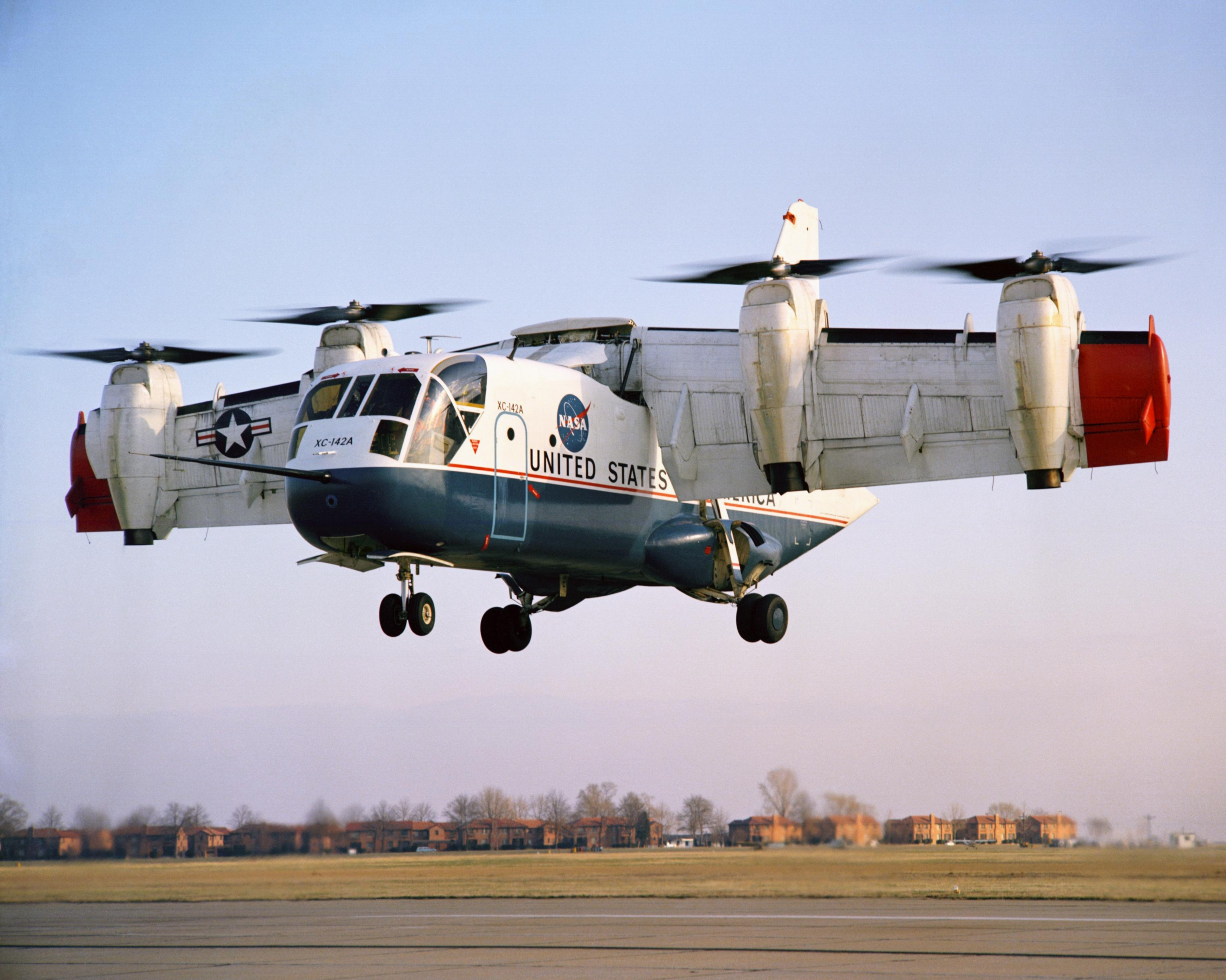
The LTV XC-142A had 4-engines articulated on a tiltwing

The tiltwing is similar to the tiltrotor, except that the rotor mountings are fixed to the wing and the whole assembly tilts between vertical and horizontal positions.

The Vertol VZ-2 was a research aircraft developed in the late 1950s. Unlike other tiltwing aircraft, Vertol designed the VZ-2 using rotors in place of propellers. On 23 July 1958, the aircraft made its first full transition from vertical flight to horizontal flight. By the time the aircraft was retired in 1965, the VZ-2 had accomplished 450 flights, including 34 full transitions.

The LTV XC-142A was another VTOL design that used the tiltwing concept. It was developed into a working prototype but did not enter mass production.

=== Rotor wing ===
A rotor wing aircraft has been attempted but is not in wide use. The Boeing X-50 Dragonfly had a two-bladed rotor driven by the engine for takeoff. In horizontal flight the rotor stopped to act like a wing. Fixed canard and tail surfaces provided lift during transition, and also stability and control in forward flight. Both examples of this aircraft were destroyed in crashes. The Sikorsky X-Wing had a four-bladed rotor utilizing compressed air to control lift over the surfaces while operating as a helicopter. At higher forward speeds, the rotor would be stopped to continue providing lift as tandem wings in an X configuration. The program was canceled before the aircraft had attempted any flights with the rotor system.

== Tail-sitter ==
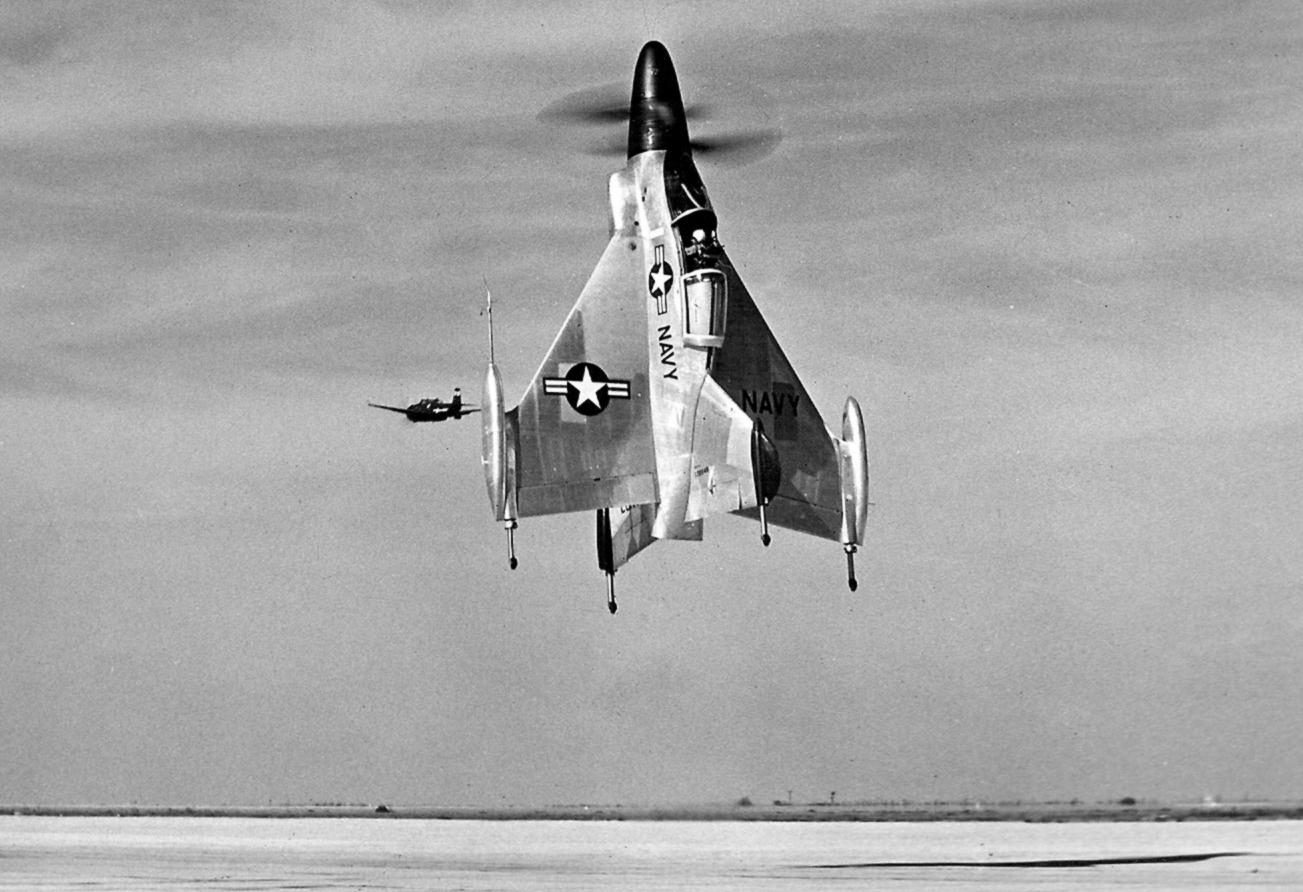
Convair XFY-1 takes off, 1954

A Tail-sitter is an aircraft that rests on the ground pointing vertically upwards, so that it rests on its tail. It takes off and lands vertically, tail down. The whole aircraft then tilts forward horizontally for normal flight. No type has ever gone into production, although a number of experimental variants have been flown, using both proprotor and jet thrust. Some have achieved successful transition between flight modes, as the turboprop-powered Convair XFY Pogo did in November 1954.

The coleopter type has an annular wing forming a duct around a lift rotor. The transition to forward flight has never been achieved, although the SNECMA Coléoptère took off, hovered and landed vertically, solely on pure jet thrust.

The German Focke-Wulf Fw Triebflügel was a design studied during the Second World War. It used pulse jets to power a rotor that rotated about the fuselage axis behind the cockpit. Similar to a coleopter fixed-wing aircraft, the Triebflügel was intended to take off and land on its tail, rotating on the pitch axis after takeoff and acceleration for forward flight. The design was never built beyond model wind tunnel testing.

== Direct thrust ==
=== Vectored thrust ===
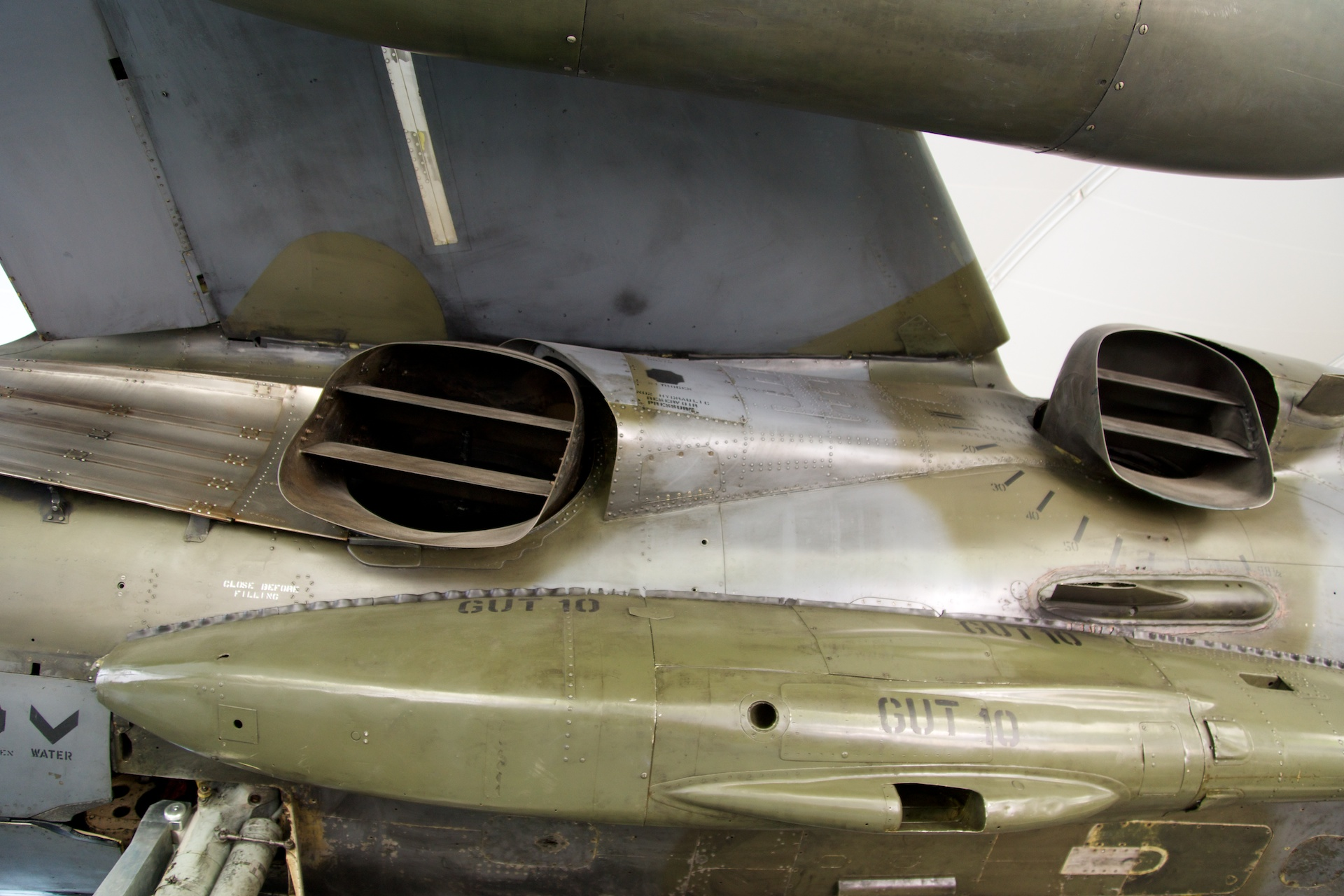
Harrier jet vents for vectoring thrust

The Harrier family of military VSTOL jet aircraft uses thrust vectoring. These aircraft are capable of vertical/short takeoff and landing (V/STOL). They are the only truly successful design of this type from the many that arose in the 1960s. These aircraft are capable of operating from small spaces, such as fields, roads, and aviation-capable ships. The Lockheed F-35B Lightning II is proposed as the next military VSTOL/STOVL design, to replace the Harrier.

==== Tiltjet ====
Similar to tiltrotor concept, but with turbojet or turbofan engines instead of ones with propellers.

=== Lift jets ===
A lift jet is a lightweight jet engine used to provide vertical thrust for VTOL operation, and is then shut down in forward flight. Some VTOL designs, including the Soviet Yakovlev Yak-38 and Yakovlev Yak-141, have used both vectored thrust from the main engine and additional thrust from auxiliary lift jets.

The Dassault Mirage IIIV was a VTOL fighter made for the NATO VTOL strike fighter requirement in the 1960s. Several other designs also resulted from this design specification.

=== Lift fans ===
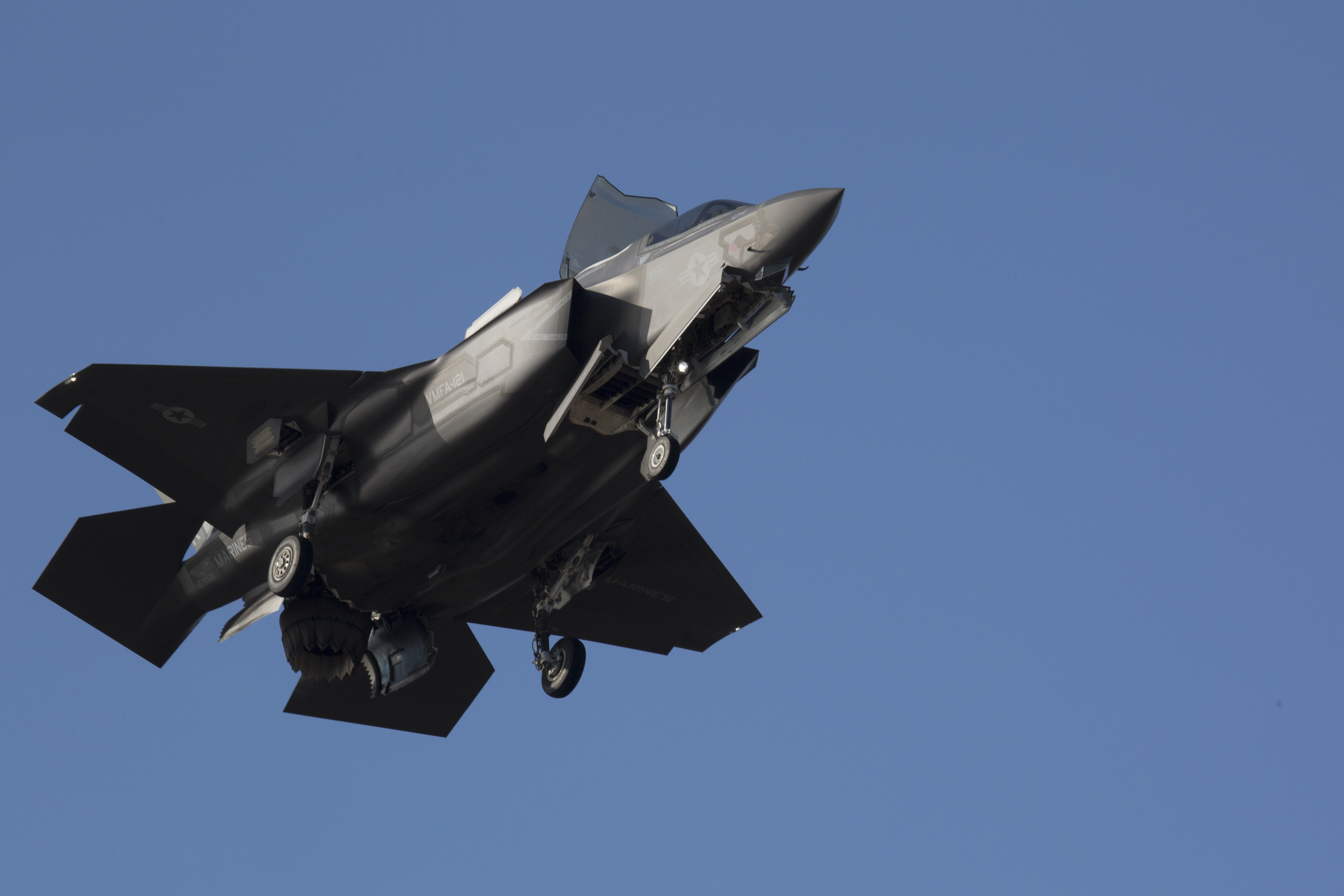
The F-35B uses both a lift-fan and vectors engine thrust down.

A lift fan configuration is where the lifting fans are located in large holes in an otherwise conventional fixed wing or fuselage. It is used for V/STOL operation. The aircraft takes off using the fans to provide lift, then transitions to more convention fixed-wing forward flight. Several experimental craft have been flown, but only the F-35 Lightning II entered into production.

== Additional examples ==
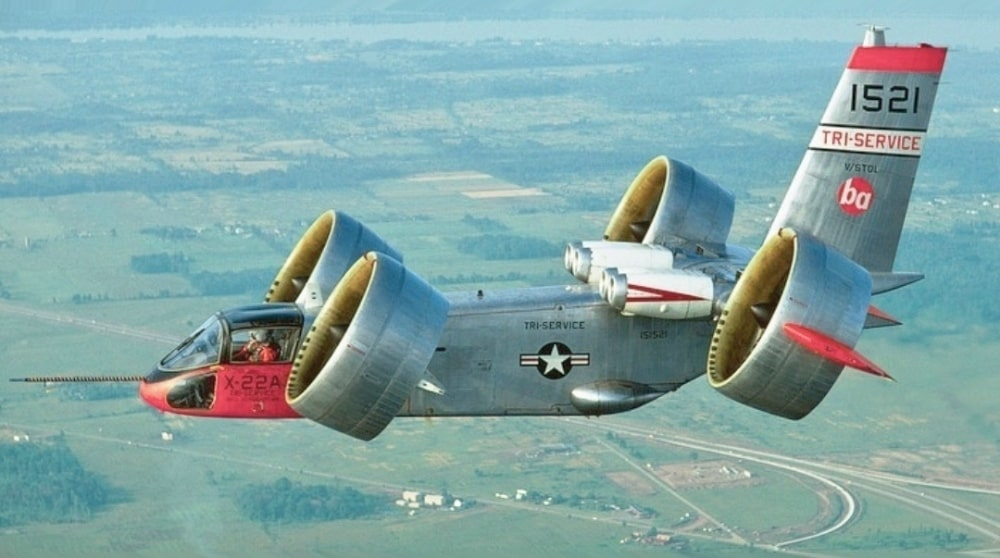
The Bell X-22 with four tilting ducted fans

- Tiltrotor
  - AgustaWestland AW609
  - Bell Eagle Eye
  - Bell MV-75
  - Bell XV-3
  - Bell XV-15
- Tiltwing
  - Canadair CL-84 Dynavert
  - LTV XC-142
- Lift jet
  - Dornier Do 31
  - Short SC.1

== See also ==
- Ducted fan
- FanWing
- Cyclogyro
- Gyrodyne
