= ST Aero FanTail =

VTOL UAV

General information
- Type: Vertical Take-off and Landing (VTOL) Unmanned Aerial Vehicle
- National origin: Singapore
- Manufacturer: ST Aerospace
- Status: Prototype / In development

History
- Introduction date: 21–25 February 2006 (Asian Aerospace)
- First flight: c. 2004 (FanTail 3000)
- Variants: FanTail 3000; FanTail 5000

The FanTail is a Vertical Take-off and Landing (VTOL) Unmanned Air Vehicle developed by ST Aerospace.

A mock-up of the UAV made its first show appearance at Asian Aerospace 2006 in Singapore (21–25 February), along with the smaller original FanTail 3000 VTOL UAV, which has already flown about 100 hours.

== Models ==
- FanTail 3000 (Prototype)
  - Overall weight: 3 kg
  - Payload weight: 0.9 kg
  - Overall length: 76 cm
  - Rotor diameter: 29 cm
  - Width (excluding landing gear):
  - Height (including landing gear):
  - Maximum level speed in horizontal position:
  - Endurance:
  - Operating distance:
  - Flight Control:
  - Airframe: modular carbon-fibre composite construction
  - Powerplant:
  - Ground Control: Window notebook-based compact ground control station with datalink terminal
- FanTail 5000
  - Overall weight: 5.5 kg
  - Payload weight: 0.4 kg
  - Overall length:
  - Rotor diameter: 46 cm
  - Width (excluding landing gear): 59 cm
  - Height (including landing gear): 115 cm
  - Maximum level speed in horizontal position: 60 Knot / 111 km/h
  - Endurance: 30 minutes in hover
  - Operating distance: 5 km
  - Flight Control: pre-programmed autonomous waypoint navigation using GPS
  - Airframe: modular carbon-fibre composite construction
  - Powerplant: 3.5 hp two-stroke gasoline engine
  - Ground Control: Window notebook-based compact ground control station with datalink terminal

== See also ==
- Heinkel Lerche
