= Lockheed Martin Cormorant =

Military aircraft prototype

Artist's depiction of the Cormorant

The Cormorant was a tailsitter project under development at Lockheed Martin's Skunk Works research facility until 2008 when its contract for development was cancelled. It is named after a species of diving bird in reference to its intended role as a submarine-launched UAV. It was hoped that it could provide all- weather ISR&T, bomb/battle damage assessment, armed reconnaissance, and special operation forces mission support.

== Development ==
The U.S. Navy's Ohio-class submarines, feature large, 44-foot-long (13 m), 7-foot-diameter (2.1 m), tubes to launch Trident missiles. Researchers at Skunk Works had the idea of creating a drone aircraft that can be stored in those missile tubes.

DARPA (Defense Advanced Research Projects Agency) provided funding for tests of models and some of the systems on board the Cormorant. The tests were completed by September 2006. After the tests were complete, DARPA was to determine whether it will fund a flying prototype. While achieving goals and capabilities during tests, DARPA cancelled the contract due to budget cuts in FY08.

== Design ==
While in the tube, the aircraft's wings are folded around itself. The Cormorant, while floating to the surface, unfolds its wings and prepares itself for launch. Rockets then assist the aircraft with lifting off from the water's surface.

A normal aircraft would never survive the pressures that are encountered at a launch depth of 150 ft (46 m). To prevent corrosion, the Cormorant was made from titanium, and to resist crushing, empty spaces were taken up with plastic foam. The interior of the craft was filled with a pressurized inert gas. To keep the Cormorant watertight, the doors, inlets, and any covers required inflatable seals.

One principal means of defense for a submarine is the ability to remain hidden underwater. Thus having an aircraft lift off near the submarine or come directly back to the submarine after its objective is complete would give away the submarine's position. To combat this, the submarine was to slip away while the Cormorant is floating to the surface. After its objective has been completed, the submarine was to transmit rendezvous coordinates to the Cormorant. A robotic retrieval vehicle was then to fetch the drone after it has landed on the surface of the water.

== Specifications ==
Data from Unmanned Aircraft Systems Roadmap 2005–2030, Office of the Secretary of Defense, p.17

General characteristics

- Crew: None
- Capacity: 1,000 pounds (450 kg)
- Length: 19 ft (5.8 m)
- Wingspan: 16 ft (4.9 m)
- Gross weight: 9,000 lb (4,082 kg)
- Fuel capacity: 2,500 pounds (1,100 kg)

Performance

- Maximum speed: Mach 0.8
- Range: 460–580 mi (740–930 km, 400–500 nmi)
- Endurance: 3 hours
- Service ceiling: 35,000 ft (11,000 m)
