= Focke Rochen =

German VTOL aircraft project

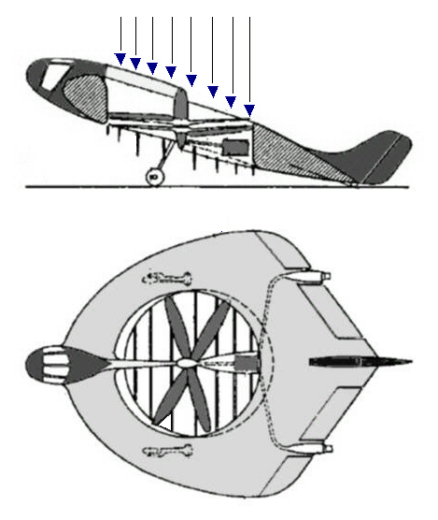
- Focke Rochen drawing

General information
- Type: Fighter
- Manufacturer: Focke-Wulf
- Status: Initially terminated by end of war but developed later
- Primary user: Luftwaffe
- Number built: None completed

The Focke Rochen (engl.: Focke Stingray), also known as Focke-Wulf Schnellflugzeug or Focke-Wulf VTOL, was a German VTOL aircraft project. Designed by Heinrich Focke of the Focke-Wulf company towards the end of World War II, the project remained unbuilt before the surrender of Nazi Germany, but saw some development in the postwar years. The information about this project is limited; it was named after the ray owing to its unusual shape. The aircraft had an airfoil section with two huge propellers in the center.

== Development ==
Towards the last years of the Third Reich, Heinrich Focke started design work on the Rochen, also known as Schnellflugzeug, as soon as he had the relevant data for the new German jet engines. In 1939, he patented the idea of a circular aircraft with a large airfoil section and an open center that acted as a huge propeller duct for twin contra-rotating propellers, driven by a projected Focke-Wulf designed turbojet engine via an axle and gearbox.

The Fw-Rochen would have achieved forward flight by vectoring the downwash from the propellers rearward through a series of louvers below them. The louvers themselves could also be completely closed for gliding flight in the event of engine failure. The exhaust nozzle forked in two at the end of the turbojet engine and ended in two auxiliary combustion chambers located on the trailing edges of the circular wing. When fuel was added, the auxiliary combustion chambers acted as primitive afterburners, providing horizontal flight. Control at low speed was achieved by varying the power to each auxiliary chamber through two small nozzles.

The landing gear was very simple, consisting of the two main gear legs on either side of the central propellers and a small tailwheel. A single fin and rudder would be provided to help with lateral stability at higher speeds. The pilot would sit in a cockpit nacelle that protruded from the front of the circular airfoil-section fuselage.

After the war, a wooden 1/10 scale model of the Rochen was built in Bremen and subjected to wind tunnel tests. Heinrich Focke filed for a patent of the aircraft in 1957, but it was never built.

== See also ==
Related lists

- List of German aircraft projects, 1939–45
- List of World War II Luftwaffe aircraft prototype projects
- Focke-Wulf Triebflugel
