= PTOL =

Point take off and landing (PTOL) is an evolving term describing special take-off and landing capabilities of unmanned aerial vehicles (UAVs), tail-sitter and other aircraft.

PTOL indicates that there is no requirement for a runway for operations (i.e., point-defence). Instead, 'point' suggests that the length of runway required is near zero, implying a minimal-sized location for touchdown and takeoff. Sometimes no prepared surface at all is needed.

PTOL is assisted in certain cases by means which are not needed by vertical take-off and landing (VTOL) or by short take-off and landing (STOL) vehicles. These may include a very long cable enforcing the convergence of the aircraft from afar onto the intended touchdown point. This may still be worthwhile due to maintaining the air-vehicle's advantages which are maximal simplicity leading to better cruise performance, as is the case using a fixed-wing UAV platform.

== Advantages ==
PTOL capability enables UAVs and aircraft to land and take off in very confined locations like rooftops, ship decks and forest clearings. This is comparable to VTOL, but it helps fixed-wing/simple UAVs achieve this, avoiding the complexity and cost of air-vehicle construction required for VTOL which include jet-thrust-rotation engines, engine pods or rotor tilting mechanisms.

This gives higher aerodynamic efficiency and allows smaller engines and lower cost, among other advantages. Also, a true PTOL solution means exact touchdowns even in adverse conditions such as the rolling and heaving deck of a ship, strong winds on land, or nearby obstacles such as trees or rocks. The ability to land a UAV direct onto a vehicle, with cushioning, adds safety to deployed UAVs, providing touchdown with no-runway or pre-prepared area and easing a quick change of the landing-site.

The fact that PTOL capable UAVs can land unassisted on rolling ships gives them an advantage over manned helicopters.

== Implementation ==
PTOL takeoffs are quite simple. Any rocket launched from a tube, or a UAV launched by a rail-launcher or similar means, is in effect making a point takeoff.

For the landings, several ideas have been proposed. An example for sea operations is catching a UAV in a parachute in the air behind a ship, then lowering the UAV to the deck by pulling the parachute in.

Another idea is 'cable-assisted PTOL' for fixed-wing UAVs. The UAV makes a cable connection to a surface winch (on a ship or on the ground) and the winch pulls the UAV down to the intended 'point'. This is potentially useful for land and naval usage of fixed-wing UAVs.

== Patents ==
Patent 4,790,497 "Point-landing method for non vertical take off and landing flying objects"

Patent 4,753,400 "Shipboard air vehicle retrieval apparatus"

Patent 4,311,290 "Arrestment system"

== See also ==
- List of aviation, avionics, aerospace and aeronautical abbreviations
- Index of aviation articles
