= Tail-sitter =

Type of VTOL aircraft

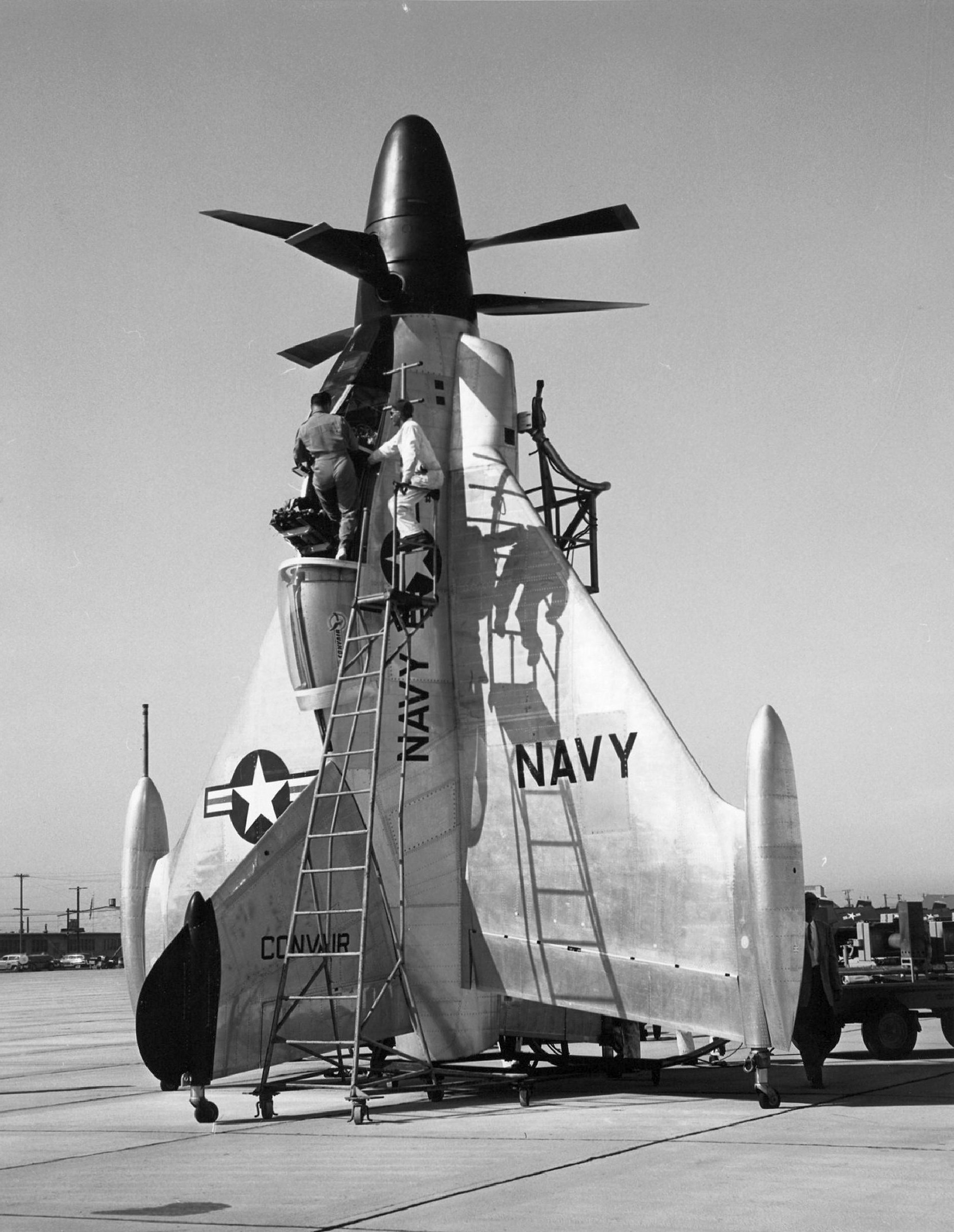
The Convair Pogo was one tailsitter design.

A tail-sitter, or tailsitter, is a type of VTOL aircraft that takes off and lands on its tail, then tilts horizontally for forward flight.

Originating in the 1920s with the inventor Nikola Tesla, the first aircraft to adopt a tail-sitter configuration were developed by Nazi Germany during the Second World War. Development of such aircraft spiked during the late 1940s and 1950s, as aircraft designers and defence planners alike recognised the potential value of fixed-wing aircraft that could perform both a vertical take-off and vertical landing while also transitioning into and out of conventional flight. Inherent problems with tail-sitter aircraft were poor pilot visibility and control difficulties, especially during vertical descent and landing. Programmes to develop manned tail-sitters were typically terminated in the form of the more practical thrust vectoring approach, as used by aircraft such as the Hawker Siddeley Harrier and Yakovlev Yak-38.

== Description ==
External videos
- Takeoff, horizontal flight and Landing on YouTube of Convair XFY Pogo

A tail-sitter sits vertically on its tail for takeoff and landing, then tilts the whole aircraft forward for horizontal flight. This is very different from the many other kinds of VTOL technologies, which have horizontally-oriented fuselages.

Tail-sitters change fuselage orientation after take-off. They start off with the back of the aircraft to the ground (a vertical orientation), and then reorient to a horizontal orientation in flight.

Some tail-sitters then landed conventionally in horizontally-oriented configuration, while others had a much more ambitious goal of landing vertically with the aircraft's back to the ground, a highly hazardous procedure for many reasons, prime of which was increased fuel consumption and limited pilot visibility.

== History ==
=== Early work ===
The concept of a tail-sitting aircraft can be attributed to originate with the inventor Nikola Tesla, who filed for an associated patent during 1928. However, no immediate attempt to implement this concept into a functional aircraft would emerge for almost two decades.

During the Second World War, Nazi Germany worked on the Focke-Wulf Triebflügel ("thrust-wing") fighter that incorporated the tail-sitter concept into its design. It featured three wings that were mounted radially as a rotor on a rotating section of the fuselage, these were driven by small jet engines positioned on the wingtips to propel the aircraft via this wing rotation. For takeoff and landing, it would fly vertically (akin to a helicopter) before tilting over horizontally to fly as a self-propelled wing generating both lift and thrust. The contemporary Heinkel Lerche project had an annular wing forming a duct around a conventional propeller, and in the transition from vertical to forward flight the lift would have transferred to the wing.

=== Cold War era ===
During the 1950s, aircraft designers around the world engaged in programmes to develop fixed-wing aircraft that could not only perform both a vertical take-off and vertical landing, but transition into and out of conventional flight as well. As observed by the aviation author Francis K. Mason, a combat aircraft that possessed such qualities would have effectively eliminate the traditional reliance on relatively vulnerable runways by taking off and landing vertically as opposed to the conventional horizontal approach. Accordingly, the development of viable vertical take-off and landing (VTOL) aircraft was particularly attractive to military planners of the early postwar era. As the thrust-to-weight ratio of turbojet engines increased sufficiently for a single engine be able to lift an aircraft, designers began to investigate ways of maintaining stability while an aircraft was flying in the VTOL stage of flight.

One company that opted to engage in VTOL research was the French engine manufacturer SNECMA who, beginning in 1956, built a series of wingless test rigs called the Atar Volant. Only the first of these was unpiloted and the second flew freely, both stabilized by gas jets on outrigger pipes The third had a tilting seat to allow the pilot to sit upright when the fuselage was level and had the lateral air intakes planned for the free flying aircraft, though it always operated attached to a movable cradle. The pilot for these experiments was Auguste Morel. However, the Atar Volant was not an end onto itself; its long term purpose was to serve as precursors to a larger fixed-wing aircraft. Independently of this work, substantial influence on the direction of development came from the Austrian design engineer Helmut von Zborowski, who had designed an innovative doughnut-shaped annular wing that could function "as power plant, airframe of a flying wing aircraft and drag-reducing housing". It was theorised that such a wing could function as a ramjet engine and propel an aircraft at supersonic speeds, suitable for an interceptor aircraft.

SNECMA's design team decided to integrate this radical annual wing design into their VTOL efforts. Accordingly, from this decision emerged the basic configuration of the C.450 Coléoptère. In December 1958, the Coléoptère first left the ground under its own power, albeit while attached to a gantry. Several challenging flight characteristics were observed, such as the tendency for the aircraft to slowly spin on its axis while in a vertical hover; its pilot also noted that the vertical speed indicator was unrealistic and that the controls were incapable of steering the aircraft with precision while performing the critical landing phase. Dead-stick landings were deemed to be an impossibility. One of aircraft's flights involved a public display of its hover performance before an assembled audience. The eye-catching design of the Coléoptère rapidly made waves in the public conscious, even internationally; author Jeremy Davis observed that the aircraft had even influenced international efforts, having allegedly motivated the United States Navy to contract American helicopter manufacturer Kaman Aircraft to design its own annular-wing vehicle, nicknamed the Flying Barrel.

Accordingly, the United States experimented with its own tail-sitters, typically involving propeller-driven design configurations with relatively conventional fixed wings. The Convair XFY Pogo was one such aircraft, featuring a delta wing with cruciform tail configuration; initial test flights were conducted inside of a naval airship hangar at Moffett Field in Mountain View, California. The XFY successfully demonstrated the full transition between flight modes on 5 November 1954. A somewhat similar aircraft was the Lockheed XFV Salmon, which paired a straight wing with an X tail; however, the XFV never achieved the crucial flight transition. However, it became evident during flight testing that such VTOL aircraft would be flown only by the most experienced pilots, even if all technical problems were disregarded; thus, it was not feasible to place VTOL fighters—as previously hoped for—on every ship. Also, whereas jet-engined fighters had top speeds that approached Mach 2, the turboprop VTOL fighter was at a disadvantage due to its maximum speed being below Mach 1. As a result of these circumstances, work on the XFY was halted. During 1955, the United States commenced flight testing of a jet-powered design, the Ryan X-13 Vertijet. Two prototypes were constructed, both of which flew, made successful transitions to and from horizontal flight, and landed. The X-13's final test flight was conducted near Washington, D.C. during 1957.

An inherent problem with all these tail-sitter designs was poor pilot visibility, especially of the ground, during vertical descent and landing. Ultimately, most work on applying the concept towards manned aircraft were abandoned upon the arrival of more practical form of VTOL appeared, in the form of thrust vectoring, as used by production aircraft such as the Hawker Siddeley Harrier and Yakovlev Yak-38. An unmanned aerial vehicle (UAV) does not suffer the problem of pilot attitude. The Dornier Aerodyne is of ducted-fan configuration similar to a coleopter, and a test UAV flew successfully in hover mode in 1972, before development was discontinued. Another contemporary UAV project was the NSRDC BQM-108 that was developed by the United States Navy; although work was discontinued almost immediately after its single successful test flight.

During the 1970s, several studies and wind tunnel models were made of a tail-sitting version of the General Dynamics F-16 Fighting Falcon that was intended for use on board ships; however, it was decided not to pursue further development of the concept due to the large thrust requirement involved, as well as the need for extensive apparatus to handle take-off and landing.

=== In the present ===
At present, most of the tail sitter projects or proposals fall under the category of unmanned aircraft such as Bell Apt or Northrop Grumman Tern. Pivotal BlackFly eVTOL with its "tilt-aircraft architecture" can also be considered a type of tail sitter.

Interceptor drones are often of tail-sitter design

== List of tail-sitters ==
Note: italicized name indicates project has not been flight tested

Type	Country	Year	Role	Description
AeroVironment SkyTote	USA	2010	UAV	Experimental
Anduril Roadrunner	USA	2023	Missile	Prototype reusable missile
Bachem Ba 349	Germany	1944	Interceptor	Prototype point-defence interceptor, similar concept to surface-to-air missiles; launched up a vertical tower, landed using parachutes.
Bell Apt	USA	2019	UAV	Planned for delivery
Bölkow P 110.1	West Germany	1950s	VTOL Fighter	Project
CDADI VD200	China	2014	UAV	Project
Convair XFY-1 Pogo	USA	1954	Fighter	Prototype trialed by the US Navy
Dornier Aerodyne	Germany	1972	UAV	Prototype
Focke-Wulf Triebflügel	Germany	1940s	Interceptor	Rotating wing around middle of fuselage driven by wingtip jets. Only reached wind tunnel-testing by project interruption
Focke Wulf Fw 860	West Germany	1950s	VTOL Fighter	Project
Heinkel Lerche	Germany	1940s	Fighter	Project
Heinkel He 231	West Germany	1950s	VTOL Fighter	Project
Junkers Ju EF 009 Hubjäger	Germany	1930s	Interceptor	Point defense interceptor with 10 radially placed turbojet engines and prone cockpit.
Lockheed Martin Cormorant	USA	2008	UAV	Prototype
Lockheed XFV-1	USA	1954	Fighter	Prototype trialed by the US Navy
Messerschmitt Me X1-21	West Germany	1950s	VTOL Fighter	Project
NASA Puffin	USA	2010	eVTOL	Project
Northrop Grumman Tern	USA	2018	UAV	Prototype
NSRDC BQM-108	USA	1976	UAV	None
Pivotal BlackFly	USA	2018	eVTOL	"Tilt-aircraft architecture". Takes off as a tail-sitter, then transitions to horizontal flight using fixed wings. Commercially available as "Pivotal Helix" as of 2025.
Rotary Rocket Roton ATV	USA	1999	Experimental	Rotorcraft test vehicle for proposed SSO space launcher.
Ryan X-13 Vertijet	USA	1955	Experimental	Prototype jet-powered fighter aircraft tried by the US Navy
Shield AI V-BAT	USA	2022	UAV	In service; designated MQ-35 by the US
Shield AI X-BAT	USA	2020s	UCAV	Systems testing
Sikorsky Rotor Blown Wing	USA	2025	UAS	DARPA AdvaNced airCraft Infrastructure-Less Launch And RecoverY (ANCILLARY)
SNECMA Coléoptère	France	1959	Experimental	Had one cylindrical wing. Never achieved transition to level flight.
Sukhoi Shkval	USSR	1960s	Interceptor	Partial Mockup; side-by-side afterburning engines, conventional landing gear.

== See also ==
- Thrust vectoring
- Tiltrotor
- Tiltjet
- Tiltwing
- Coleopter
- PTOL
- VTOL

	Aerostat	Aerodyne		
	Lift: Lighter than air gas	Lift: Fixed wing	Lift: Unpowered rotor	Lift: Powered rotor
Unpowered free flight	(Free) balloon	Glider	Helicopter, etc. in autorotation	(None – see note 2)
Tethered (static or towed)	Tethered balloon	Kite	Rotor kite	(None – see note 2)
Powered	Airship	Airplane, ornithopter, etc.	Autogyro	Gyrodyne, helicopter
