= Northrop Grumman Tern =

Experimental aircraft

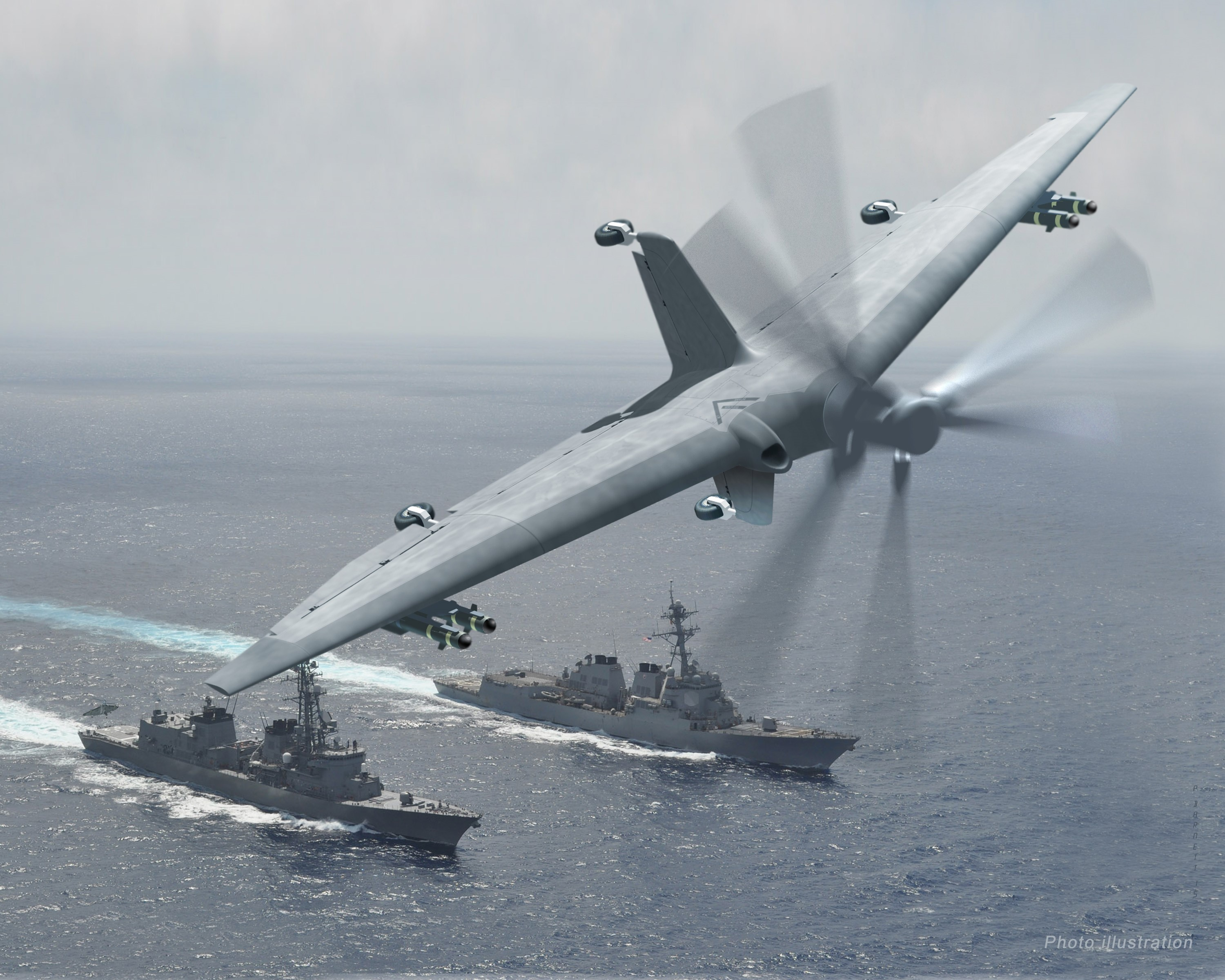
Artist conception

Tactically Exploited Reconnaissance Node (TERN), a joint program between DARPA and the U.S. Navy's Office of Naval Research (ONR), seeks to greatly increase the effectiveness of forward-deployed small-deck ships such as destroyers and frigates by enabling them to serve as mobile launch and recovery sites for specially designed unmanned aerial systems (UAS). These vehicles are to carry 600 pounds (270 kg) of ordnance in order to conduct combat strikes.

== History ==
The program culminated in successful Conceptual Design Reviews in summer 2014. In May 2014, DARPA and the ONR signed a Memorandum of Agreement, officially naming the project Tern. In October 2015, the Tern program passed a significant milestone with the successful completion Phase II preliminary design, culminating in a successful Preliminary Design Review.

Northrop Grumman won the contract to develop the project in December 2015 with tail-sitter, flying wing aircraft with a twin nose-mounted contra-rotating propeller propulsion system.
