= Lockheed XFV =

Experimental aircraft in the US

XFV "Salmon"
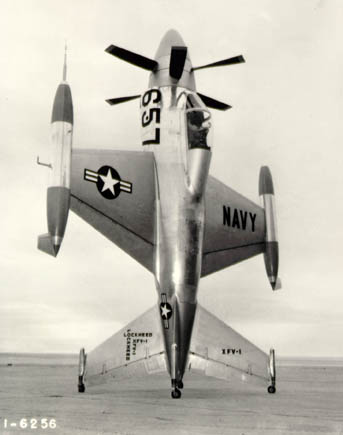

General information
- Type: Experimental VTOL fighter aircraft
- National origin: United States
- Manufacturer: Lockheed Corporation
- Primary user: United States Navy (intended)
- Number built: 1 flying prototype plus 1 incomplete airframe

History
- Manufactured: 1954
- First flight: 16 June 1954

The Lockheed XFV (sometimes referred to as the "Salmon") (Note: The name was very obviously derived from the Lockheed Chief Test Pilot Herman "Fish" Salmon's name. Lockheed proposed naming the aircraft "Rising Star", but this was rejected by the Navy.) is an American experimental tailsitter prototype aircraft built by Lockheed in the early 1950s to demonstrate the operation of a vertical takeoff and landing (VTOL) fighter for protecting convoys.

== Design and development ==
The Lockheed XFV originated as a result of a proposal issued by the U.S. Navy in 1948 for an aircraft capable of vertical takeoff and landing (VTOL) aboard platforms mounted on the afterdecks of conventional ships. Both Convair and Lockheed competed for the contract but in 1950, the requirement was revised, with a call for a research aircraft capable of eventually evolving into a VTOL ship-based convoy escort fighter. On 19 April 1951, two prototypes were ordered from Lockheed under the designation XFO-1 (company designation was Model 081–40–01). Soon after the contract was awarded, the project designation changed to XFV-1 when the Navy's code for Lockheed was changed from O to V.

The XFV was powered by a 5,332 hp (3,976 kW) Allison YT40-A-6 turboprop engine driving three-bladed contra-rotating propellers. The tail surfaces were a reflected cruciform v-tail (forming an x) that extended above and below the fuselage. The aircraft had an ungainly appearance on the ground with a makeshift, fixed landing gear attached. Lockheed employees derisively nicknamed the aircraft the "pogo stick" (a direct reference to the rival Convair XFY's name).

== Testing and evaluation ==
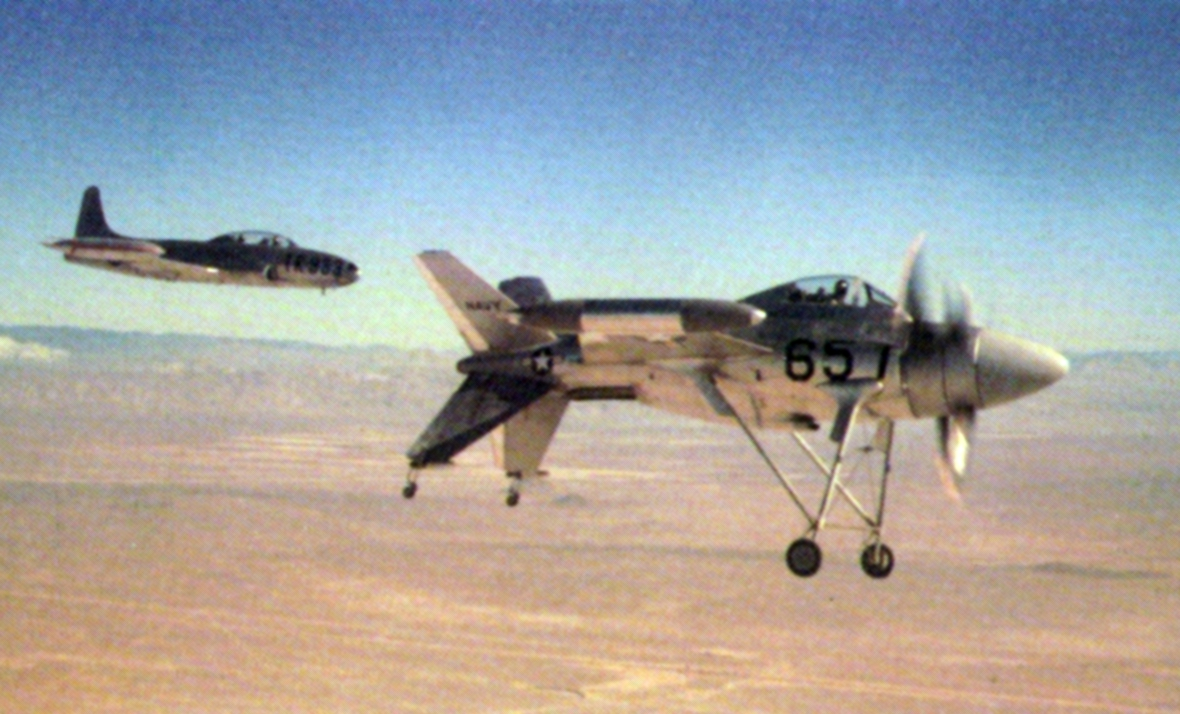
The first XFV-1 during a test flight at Edwards AFB

To begin flight testing, a temporary non-retractable undercarriage with long braced V-legs was attached to the fuselage, and fixed tail wheels attached to the lower pair of fins. In this form, the aircraft was trucked to Edwards AFB in November 1953 for ground testing and taxiing trials. During one of these tests, at a time when the aft section of the large spinner had not yet been fitted, Lockheed chief test pilot Herman "Fish" Salmon managed to taxi the aircraft past the liftoff speed, and the aircraft made a brief hop on 22 December 1953. The official first flight took place on 16 June 1954.

Full VTOL testing at Edwards AFB was delayed pending the availability of the 7,100 shp Allison T54, which never materialized. After the brief unintentional hop, the aircraft made a total of 32 flights. All further XFV-1 flights did not involve any vertical takeoffs or landings. The XFV-1 was able to make a few transitions in flight from the conventional to the vertical flight mode and back, and had briefly held in hover at altitude. Performance remained limited by the confines of the flight test regime. With the realization that the XFV's top speeds would be eclipsed by contemporary fighters and that only highly experienced pilots could fly the aircraft, the project was cancelled in June 1955.

Salmon taxied the XFV-1 on its temporary gear "from a standing start to 175 mph, and then brought it back down to a dead stop without any use of the brakes, all within a distance of one mile."

== Variants ==
- XFO-1/XFV-1: (Model 081–40–01) Two prototypes built, one flown.
- FV-2: Proposed production version (Model 181–43–02) was to have been powered by the T54-A-16 turboprop, incorporating a bullet-proof windshield, armor and radar in the fixed forward part of the nose spinner. The proposed armament was four 20 mm cannon fitted in the two wingtip pods. Alternatively, 48 2 3/4-inch folding-fin rockets could be fitted.

== Aircraft on display ==
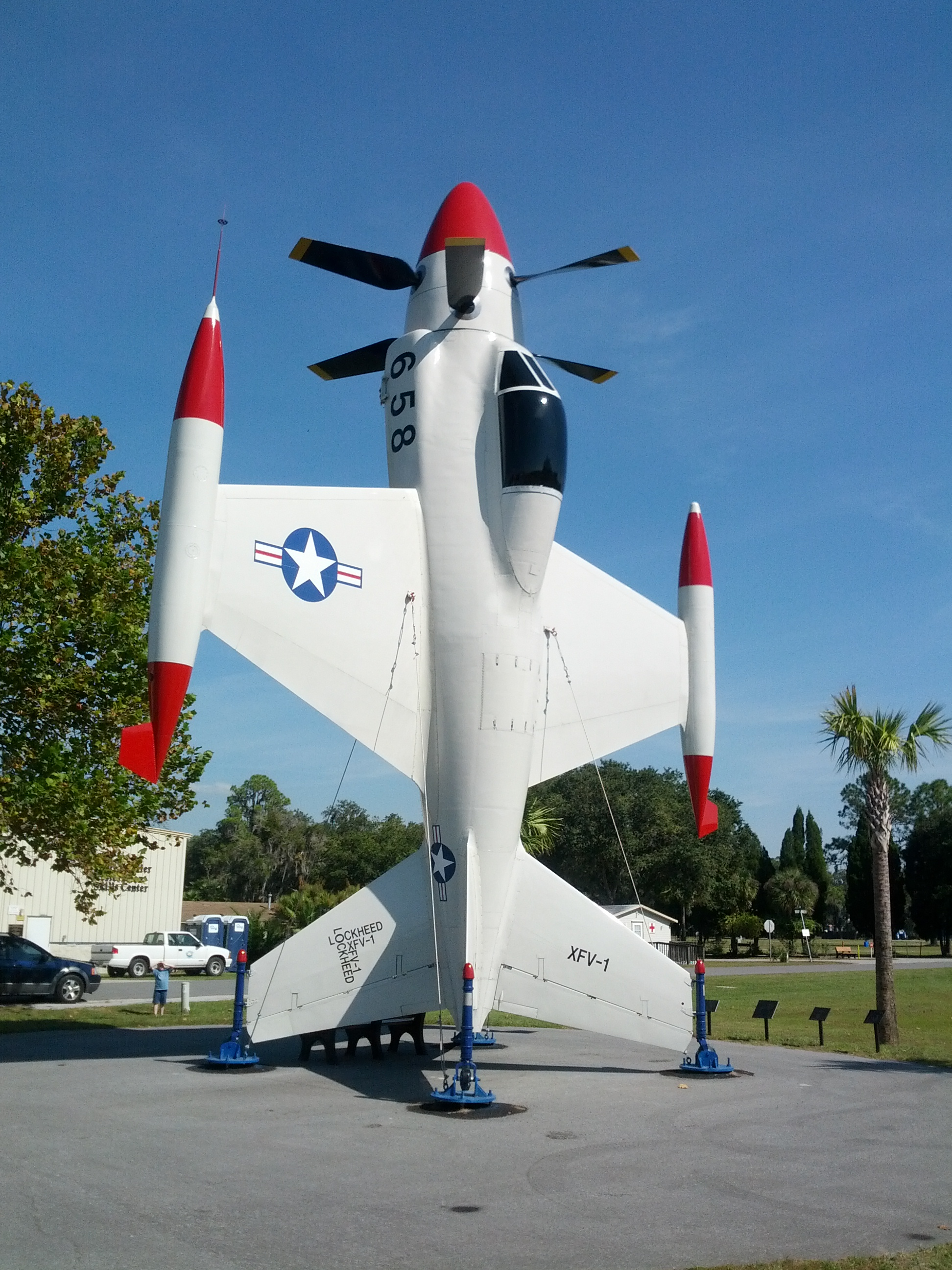
Vertical display of the XFV-1 Prototype at Florida Air Museum at Sun-n-Fun

The single flying prototype ended up as an exhibit at the Sun 'n Fun Campus Museum at Lakeland Linder International Airport in Lakeland, Florida. This example was refurbished at the museum's Buehler Restoration Center and is currently on outdoor display. The aircraft was assigned USN/USMC Bureau Number 138657, but was marked as 658 following restoration. The second prototype, which was never completed, is on display at Los Alamitos Army Airfield in California.

== Specifications (XFV-1) ==
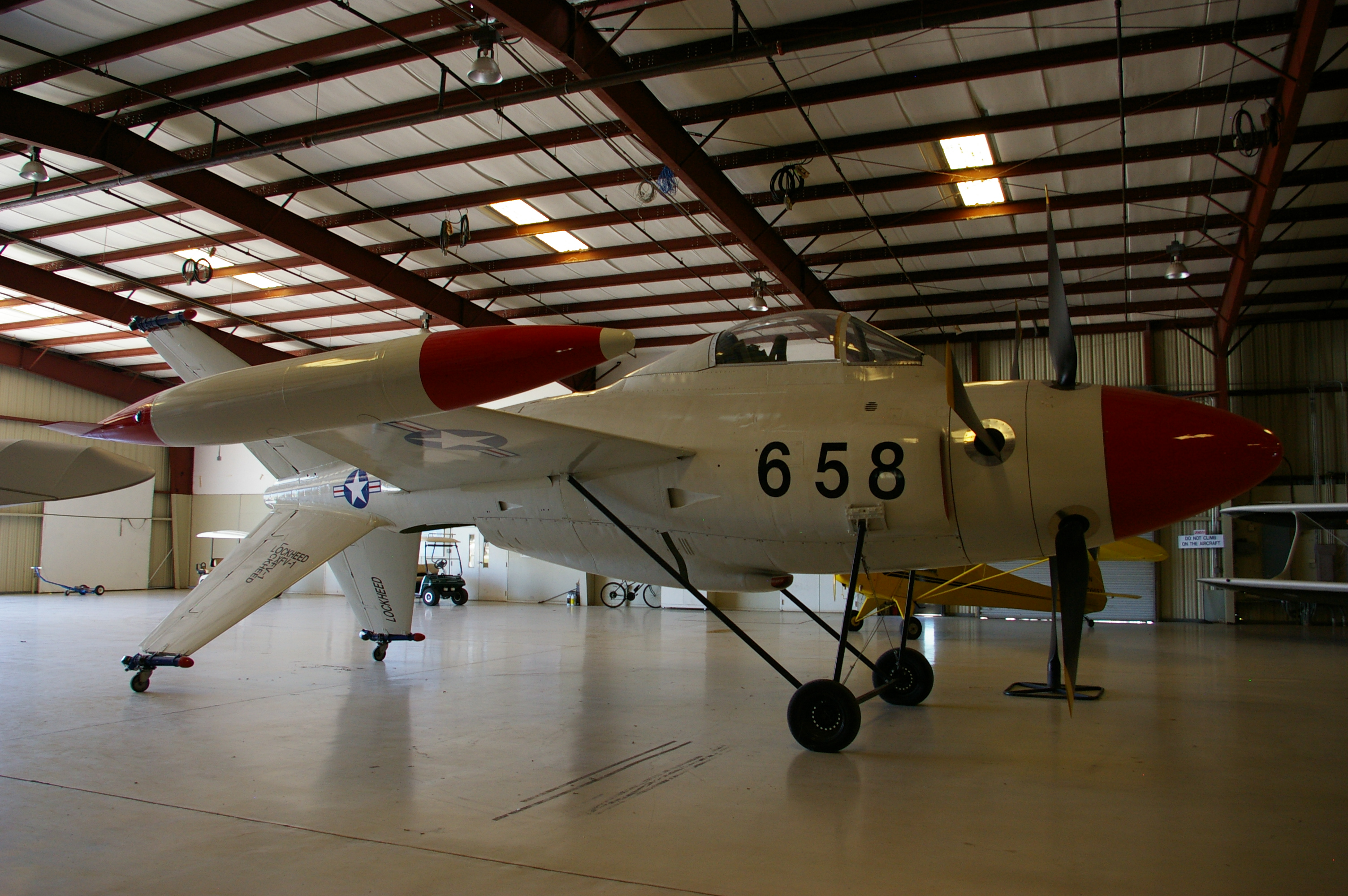
The XFV-1 prototype located at Sun 'n Fun Museum, Lakeland, Florida

General characteristics

- Crew: 1
- Length: 36 ft 10.25 in (11.23 m)
- Wingspan: 30 ft 10.1 in (9.4 m)
- Height: 15 ft 6.65 in (4.5 m)
- Wing area: 246 sq ft (22.85 m^{2})
- Empty weight: 11,599 lb (5,261 kg)
- Gross weight: 16,221 lb (7,358 kg)
- Max takeoff weight: 16,221 lb (7,358 kg)
- Powerplant: 1 × Allison XT40-A-14 turboprop, 6 blade contra-rotating, 5,100 shp (3,800 kW)

Performance

- Maximum speed: 580 mph (930 km/h, 500 kn)
- Cruise speed: 410 mph (660 km/h, 360 kn)
- Service ceiling: 43,300 ft (13,100 m)
- Rate of climb: 10,820 ft/min (55.0 m/s)
- Wing loading: 65.9 lb/sq ft (322 kg/m^{2})

Armament
4 × 20 mm (.79 in) cannons or 48 × 2.75 in (70 mm) rockets

Note: Performance estimates are based on XFV with YT40-A-14 engine.

== See also ==
Aircraft of comparable role, configuration, and era

- Convair XFY
- Focke-Wulf Triebflügel
- Heinkel Lerche
- Ryan X-13 Vertijet

Related lists

- List of Lockheed aircraft
- List of fighter aircraft
- List of United States Navy aircraft designations (pre-1962)
- List of military aircraft of the United States
