= Ducted fan =

Air moving arrangement

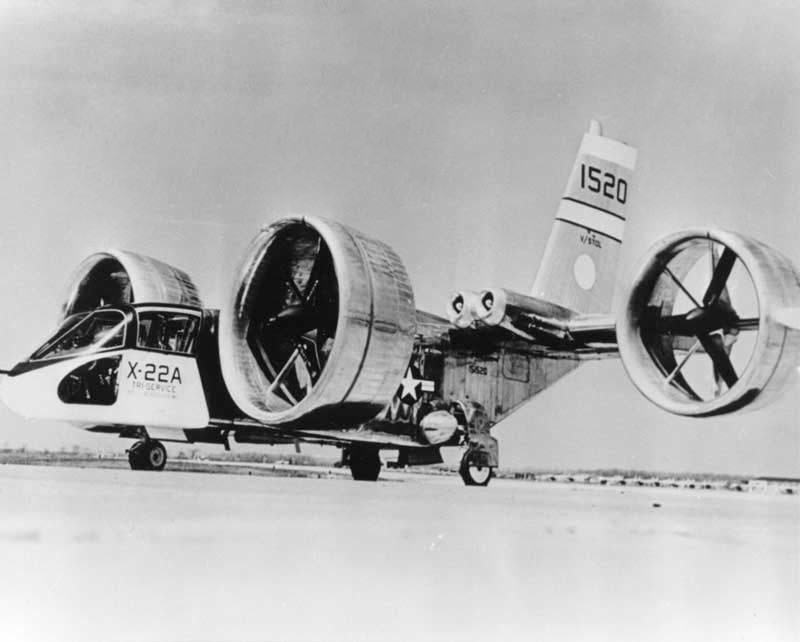
Bell X-22

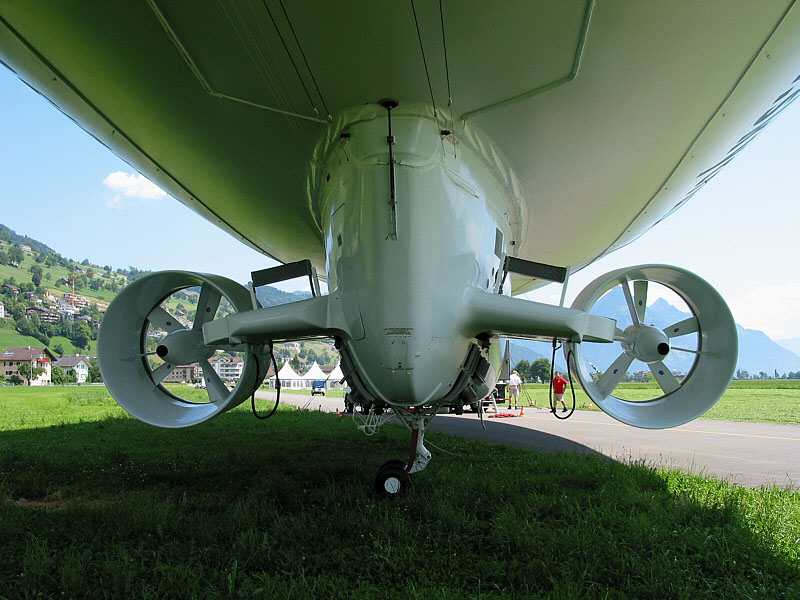
Dirigible airship with ducted fans

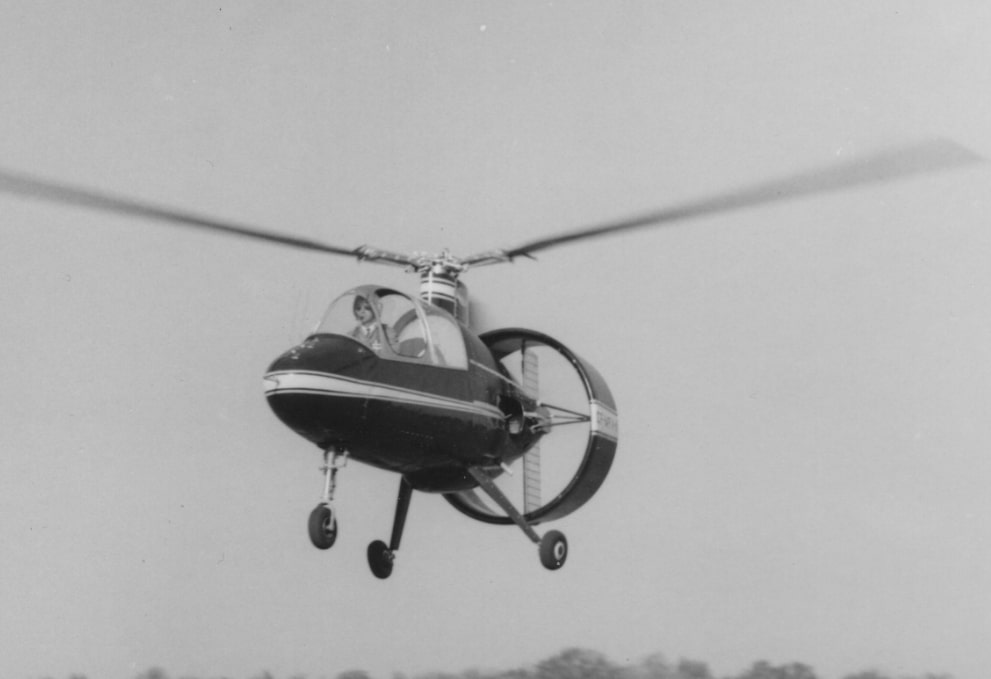
Avian Gyroplane with ducted pusher prop (but no tail-boom)

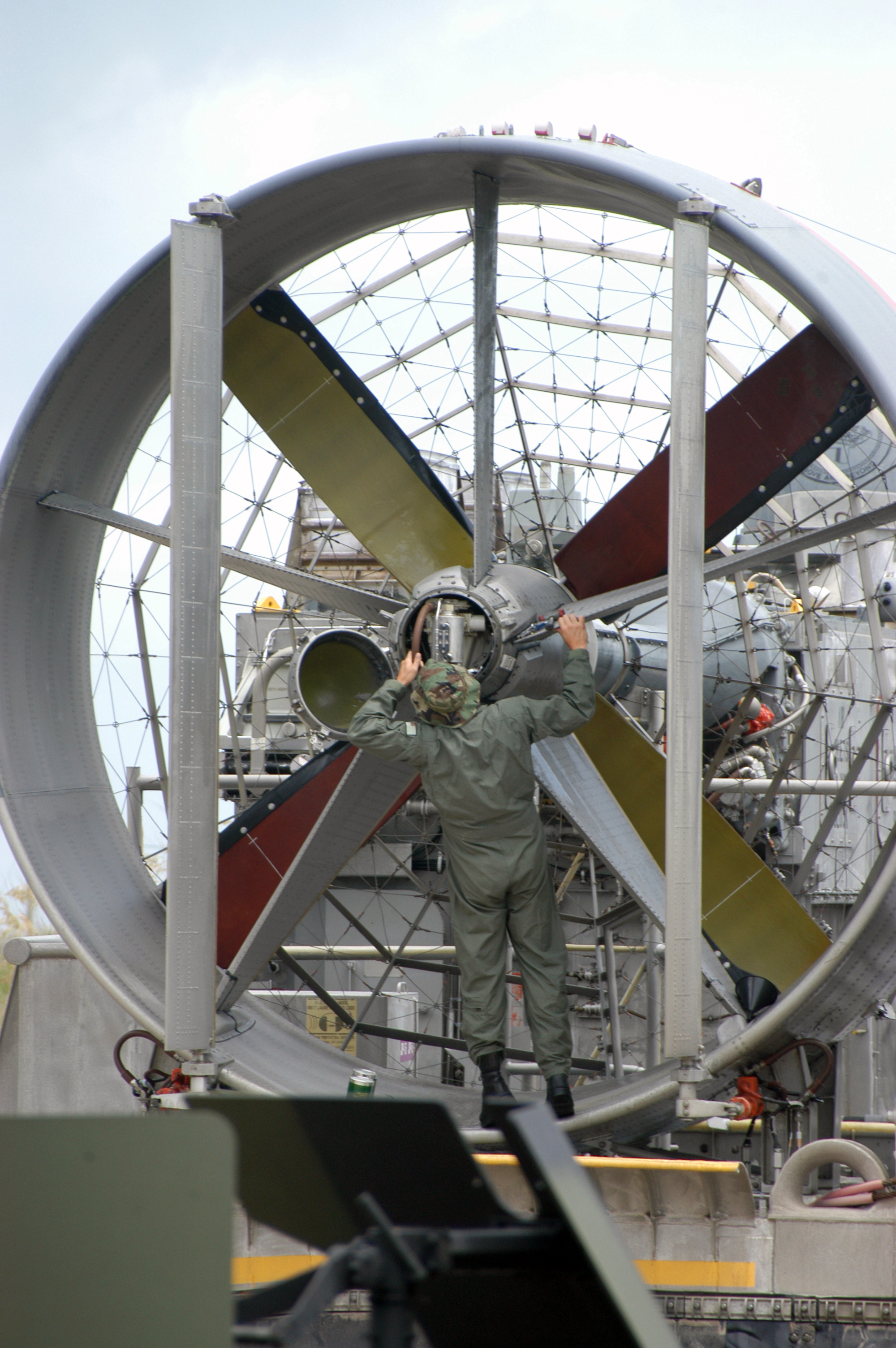
Ducted fan on an Air Cushion Landing Craft

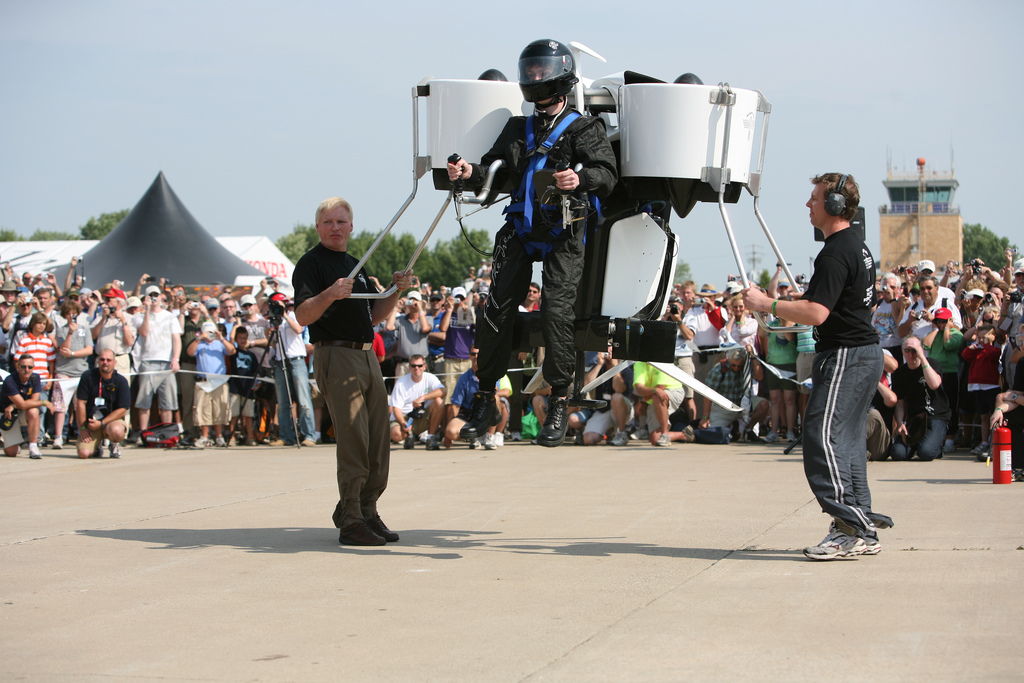
The Martin Jetpack personal aircraft with ducted fans

In aeronautics, a ducted fan is a thrust-generating mechanical fan or propeller mounted within a cylindrical duct or shroud. Other terms include ducted propeller or shrouded propeller. When used in vertical takeoff and landing (VTOL) applications it is also known as a shrouded rotor.

Ducted fans are used for propulsion or direct lift in many types of vehicle including airplanes, airships, hovercraft, and powered lift VTOL aircraft. The high-bypass turbofan engines used on many modern airliners is an example of a very successful and popular use of ducted fan design.

The duct increases thrust, in comparison to a similar-sized propeller in free air. Ducted fans are quieter, and offer good opportunities for thrust vectoring. The shroud offers good protection to ground personnel from accidentally contacting the spinning blades, as well as protecting the blades themselves from external debris or objects. By varying the cross-section of the duct the designer can adjust the velocity and pressure of the airflow according to Bernoulli's principle.

Drawbacks include increased weight due to the added structure of the shroud, a need for precision in tolerances of blade-tip to shroud clearance, a need for better vibration control compared to free-air propellers, and complex duct design requirements. Lastly, when at high angles of attack, the shroud can stall and produce high drag.

== Design ==
A ducted fan has three main components; the fan or propeller which provides thrust or lift, the duct or shroud which surrounds the fan, and the engine or motor which powers the fan.

=== Fan ===
Like any other fan, propeller or rotor, a ducted fan is characterised by the number of blades. The Rhein Flugzeugbau (RFB) SG 85 had three blades, while the Dowty Rotol Ducted Propulsor had seven. The blades may be of fixed or variable pitch. See: Fan (machine)

=== Duct ===
The duct or shroud is an aerodynamic ring which surrounds the fan and closely fits the blade tips. It must be made rigid enough not to distort under flight loads nor touch the blades as they turn. The duct performs several functions:

Principally, it reduces the vortices created by air flowing around the ends of the blades. This reduces the aerodynamic losses or drag, thus increasing the overall efficiency of the fan. Because of this, the fan can either be used to provide increased thrust and aircraft performance, or be made smaller than the equivalent free propeller.

It provides acoustic shielding which, together with the reduced energy waste, significantly cuts noise emissions from the propeller.

It acts as a protective device, to protect objects such as ground staff from being hit by the whirling blades, to protect the blades from damage during such an impact, and to protect the aircraft fuselage and contents (including crew, passengers, fuel tanks, hydraulic systems, etc.) from impact damage in the event of propeller failure.

The reduced tip vortices also mean that the fan wake is less turbulent. With careful design, the heated discharge from the engine cooling system can be injected into the low-turbulence fan wake to increase thrust.

=== Engine ===
A ducted fan may be powered by any kind of engine or motor capable of turning the fan. Examples include piston, rotary (Wankel), and turboshaft combustion engines, and electric motors.

The fan may be mounted directly on the engine output shaft, or driven remotely via an extended drive shaft and gearing. In the remote arrangement, several fans may be driven by a single engine.

=== Ducted propulsion ===
An assembly designed throughout as a single integrated unit is referred to as a fan pod or ducted propulsor.

An advantage of the pod approach is that the design of each component can be matched to the others, helping to maximise performance and minimise weight. It also eases the vehicle designer's task of integration with the vehicle and its systems.

=== Limitations ===
- Good efficiency requires very small clearances between the blade tips and the duct.
- Efficiency advantages are reduced, and may even be reversed, at lower rotation speeds, thrust levels, and airspeeds.
- Requires reduced vibration levels compared to a free propeller or rotor.
- Complex duct design, and weight increase even if constructed from advanced composites.
- At high angle of attack, parts of the duct will stall and produce aerodynamic drag.

== Applications ==
The most common ducted fan arrangement used in aircraft is a turbofan engine, where the power to turn the fan is provided by a gas turbine. High-bypass ratio turbofans are used on civilian airliners, while military fighters need the better high-speed performance of a low bypass ratio turbofan with a smaller fan diameter. However, a ducted fan may be powered by any source of shaft power such as a reciprocating engine, Wankel engine, or electric motor. A kind of ducted fan, known as a fantail or by the trademark name Fenestron, is also used to replace tail rotors on helicopters.

Ducted fans are favored in VTOL aircraft such as the Lockheed Martin F-35 Lightning II, and other low-speed designs such as hovercraft for their higher thrust-to-weight ratio.

In some cases, a shrouded rotor can be 94% more efficient than an open rotor. The improved performance is mainly because the outward flow is less contracted and thus carries more kinetic energy.

Among model aircraft hobbyists, the ducted fan is popular with builders of high-performance radio controlled model aircraft. Glow-plug engines combined with ducted-fan units were the first achievable means of modeling a scaled-size jet aircraft. Despite the introduction of model-scale turbojet engines, electric-powered ducted fans remain popular on smaller, lower-cost model aircraft. Some electric-powered ducted fan airplanes can reach speeds of more than 200 mph (320 km/h).

Most cooling fans used in computers contain a duct integrated into the fan assembly; the duct is also used for mechanically mounting the fan to other components.

== See also ==
- Avian Gyroplane
- Ducted propeller – Marine propeller with a non-rotating nozzle
- Geared turbofan – Turbofan engine with a gearbox used to drive its fan
- RFB Fantrainer – Training aircraft in Germany
