= Focke-Wulf Triebflügel =

1944 German concept for a VTOL aircraft

FW Triebflügel
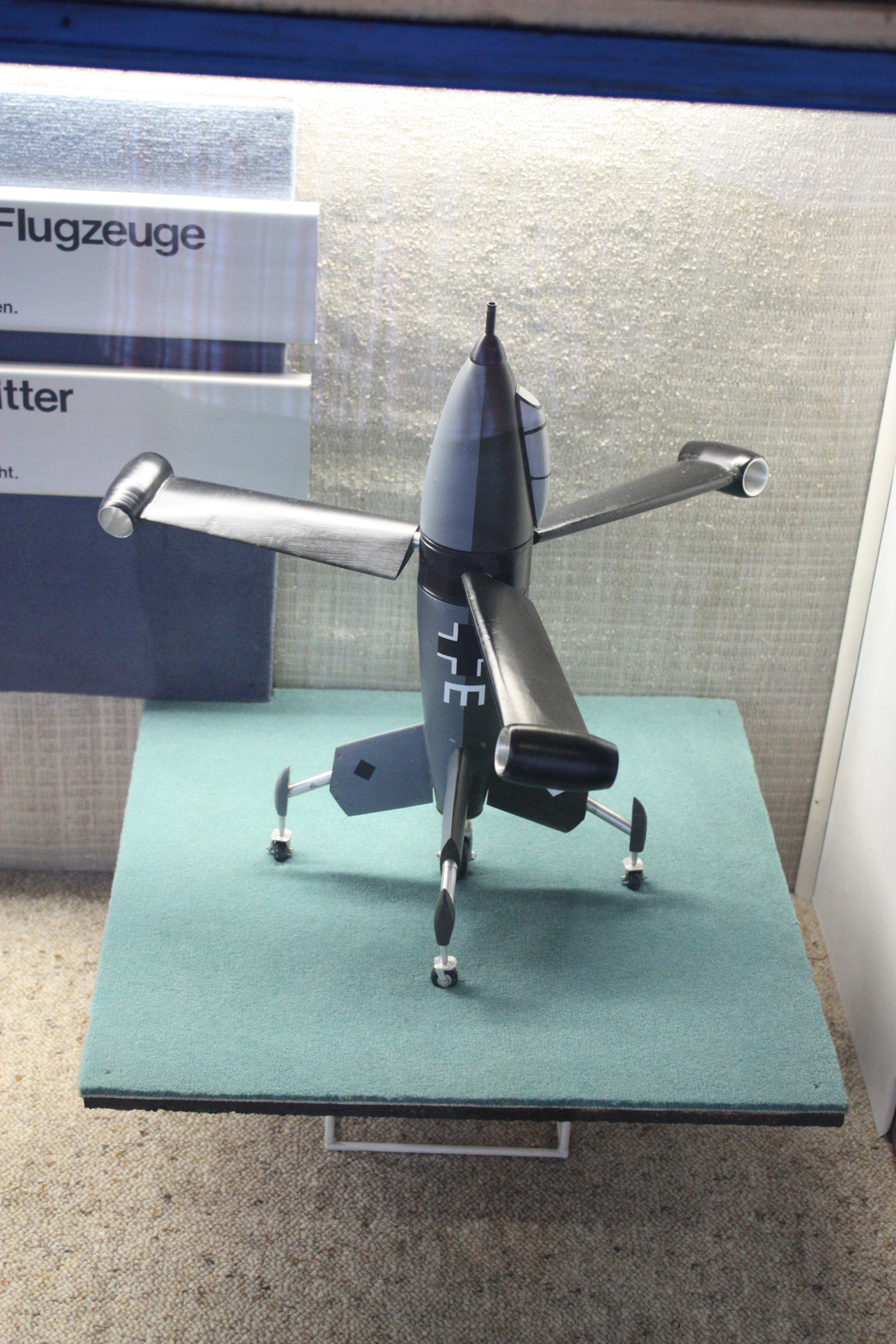

General information
- Type: VTOL interceptor aircraft
- National origin: Nazi Germany
- Manufacturer: Focke-Wulf
- Status: Concept only

The Focke-Wulf Triebflügel, or Triebflügeljäger, literally meaning "thrust-wing fighter", was a German concept for an aircraft designed in 1944, during the final phase of World War II, as a defence against the ever-increasing Allied bombing raids on central Germany. It was a vertical take-off and landing tailsitter interceptor design for local defense of important factories or areas which had small or no airfields.

The Triebflügel had only reached wind-tunnel testing when the Allied forces reached the production facilities. No complete prototype was ever built.

== Design ==
The design was particularly unusual. It had no wings, and all lift and thrust were provided by a rotor/propeller assembly 1/3 of the way down the side of the craft (roughly halfway between the cockpit and tailplane). When the plane was sitting on its tail in the vertical position, the rotors would have functioned similarly to a helicopter. When flying horizontally, they would function more like a giant propeller.

The three rotor blades were mounted on a ring assembly supported by bearings, allowing free rotation around the fuselage. At the end of each was a ramjet. To start the rotors spinning, simple rockets would have been used. As the speed increased, the flow of air would have been sufficient for the ramjets to work and the rockets would expire. The pitch of the blades could be varied with the effect of changing the speed and the lift produced. There was no reaction torque to cause a counter rotation of the fuselage, since the rotor blades were driven at their tips by the ramjets. Fuel was carried in the fuselage tanks, and was piped through the centre support ring and along the rotors to the jets.

A cruciform empennage at the rear of the fuselage comprised four tailplanes, fitted with moving ailerons that would also have functioned as combined rudders and elevators. The tailplane would have provided a means for the pilot to control a tendency of the fuselage to rotate in the same direction as the rotor, caused by the friction of the rotor ring, as well as controlling flight in pitch, roll and yaw.

A single large and sprung wheel in the extreme end of the fuselage provided the main undercarriage. Four small castoring wheels on extensible struts were placed at the end of each tailplane to steady the aircraft on the ground and allow it to be moved. The main and outrigger wheels were covered by streamlined clamshell doors when in flight.

When taking off, the rotors would be angled to give lift in a similar manner to a helicopter. Once the aircraft had attained sufficient altitude the pilot would tilt it over into level flight. The rotors continued spinning in level flight, maintaining 220 rpm at the aircraft's maximum forward speed.

Forward flight required a slight nose-up pitch to provide some upward lift as well as primarily forward thrust. Consequently, the four cannon in the forward fuselage would have been angled slightly downward in relation to the centreline of the fuselage.

To land, the craft had to slow its speed and pitch the fuselage until the craft was vertical. Power could then be reduced and it would descend until the landing gear rested on the ground. This would have been a tricky and probably dangerous maneuver, given that the pilot would be seated facing upward and the ground would be behind their head at this stage. Unlike some other tailsitter aircraft, the pilot's seat was fixed in the direction for forward flight. The spinning rotor would also obscure rear vision.

=== Comparable aircraft designs ===
This design was unique among 20th-century VTOL craft, and other German concept craft. However, some early design studies for the Rotary Rocket Roton spacecraft in the 1990s showed a free-spinning rotor with tip-driven rotors providing lift.

In the 1950s, the US built prototype tailsitter aircraft (the Lockheed XFV, and Convair XFY Pogo), but these were powered by conventional turboprops, with nose-mounted contra-rotating propellers to counter torque. They also used conventional wings for lift, though their cruciform tails with integral landing gear were broadly comparable to the Triebflügel.

== Specifications ==
General characteristics

- Crew: one
- Length: 9.15 m (30 ft 0 in)
- Wingspan: 11.5 m (38 ft 0 in)
- Gross weight: 2,500 kg (5,200 lb)
- Powerplant: 3 × Pabst ramjets, 8.9 kN (2,000 lbf) thrust each
- Powerplant: 3 × Walter liquid fuel rockets
- Powerplant: 2 × standard German Walter 109-501 RATO units , 14.71 kN (3,306 lbf) thrust each

Performance

- Maximum speed: 1,000 km/h (621 mph, 540 kn)
- Never exceed speed: 2,700 km/h (1,730 mph, 1,500 kn)
- Minimum control speed: 230 km/h (150 mph, 130 kn)
- Service ceiling: 15,300 m (50,000 ft)
- Rate of climb: 50 m/s (9,800 ft/min)

Armament

- Guns: 2 × 30 mm MK-103 each with 100 rounds + 2 × 20 mm MG-151 each with 250 rounds

== See also ==
- Coleopter
- Focke Rochen
- Heinkel Lerche
- List of German aircraft projects, 1939–45
