= Heinkel Lerche =

1944 German VTOL coleopter design

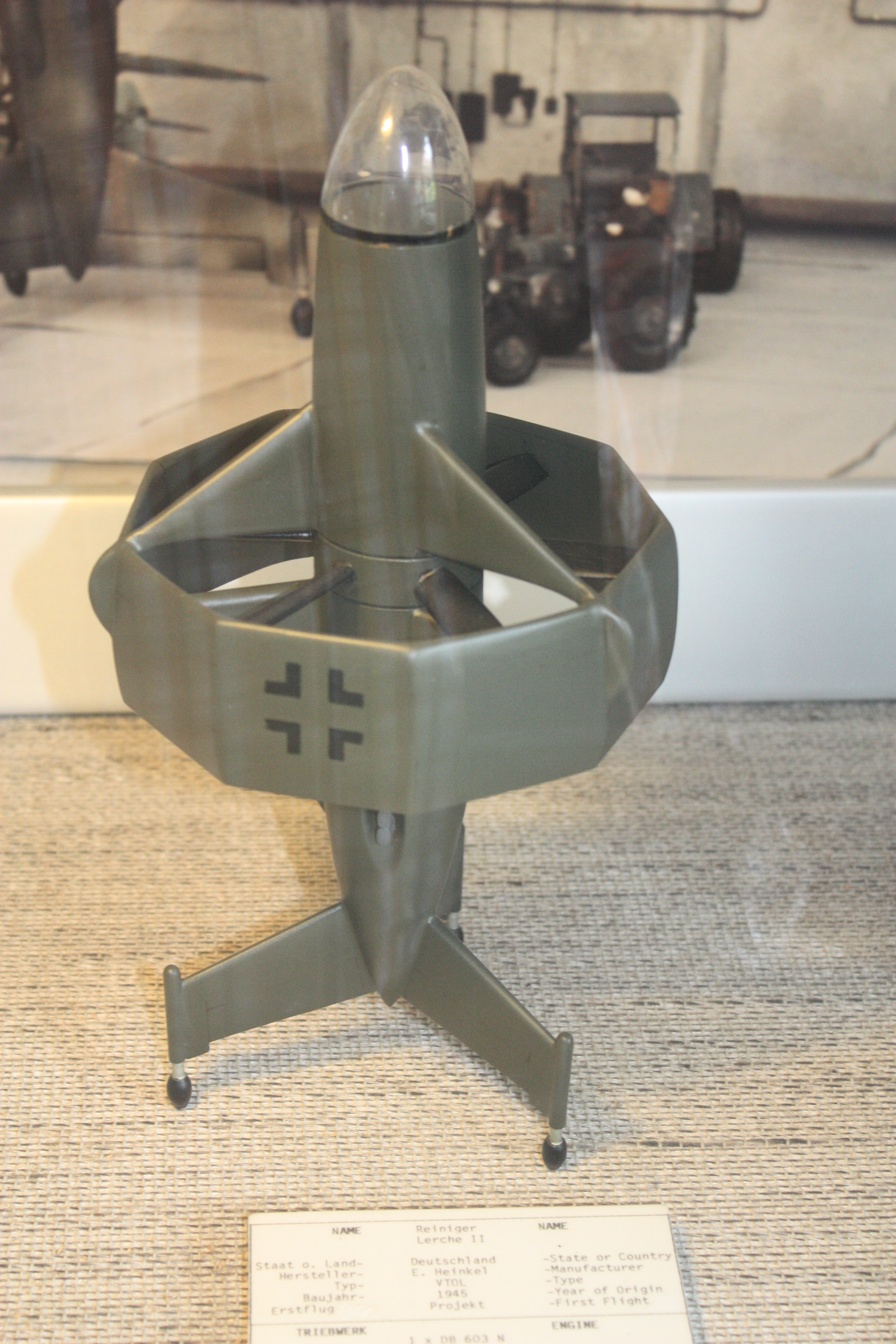

General information
- Type: Tail-sitter Fighter
- National origin: Germany
- Manufacturer: Heinkel
- Designer: Heinkel
- Status: Paper project only, never built

The Heinkel Lerche (English: Lark) was the name of a set of project studies made by German aircraft designer Heinkel in 1944 and 1945 for a VTOL fighter and ground-attack aircraft.

The Lerche was an early coleopter design. It would take off and land sitting on its tail, flying horizontally like a conventional aircraft. The pilot would lie prone in the nose. It would be powered by two contra-rotating propellers which were contained in a doughnut-shaped, nine-sided annular wing.

The design was developed starting 1944 and concluding in March 1945. The aerodynamic principles of an annular wing were basically sound, but the proposal was faced with a host of unsolved manufacture and control problems which would have made the project highly impractical, even without the material shortages of late-war Nazi Germany.

== Specifications (Lerche II) ==
Figures below are given for the 'Lerche II' plan dated 25 Feb 1945.

Data from

General characteristics

- Crew: 1
- Length: 9.4 m (30 ft 10 in)
- Wingspan: 4 m (13 ft 1 in)
- Wing area: 12 m^{2} (130 sq ft)
- Empty weight: 4,500 kg (9,921 lb)
- Gross weight: 5,600 kg (12,346 lb)
- Powerplant: 2 × Daimler-Benz DB 605D V-12 liquid-cooled direct fuel-injected piston engines 2,000 PS (1,500 kW; 2,000 hp)
  or 2 × Daimler-Benz DB 603E V-12 liquid-cooled direct fuel-injected piston engines 2,400 PS (1,800 kW; 2,400 hp)

Performance

- Maximum speed: 800 km/h (500 mph, 430 kn)
- Cruise speed: 553 km/h (344 mph, 299 kn)
- Never exceed speed: 1,282 km/h (797 mph, 692 kn)
- Service ceiling: 14,300 m (46,900 ft)
- Rate of climb: 50 m/s (9,800 ft/min)

Armament

- Guns: 2 × 30 mm (1.18 in) MK 108 cannon
- Missiles: 3 × Ruhrstahl X-4 Air to Air Missile (Optional)

== See also ==
Aircraft of comparable role, configuration, and era

- Convair XFY Pogo
- Focke-Wulf Triebflügel
- Lockheed XFV
- SNECMA Coléoptère

Related lists

- List of military aircraft of Germany
- List of World War II military aircraft of Germany
