= Convair XFY Pogo =

American experimental VTOL aircraft

XFY Pogo
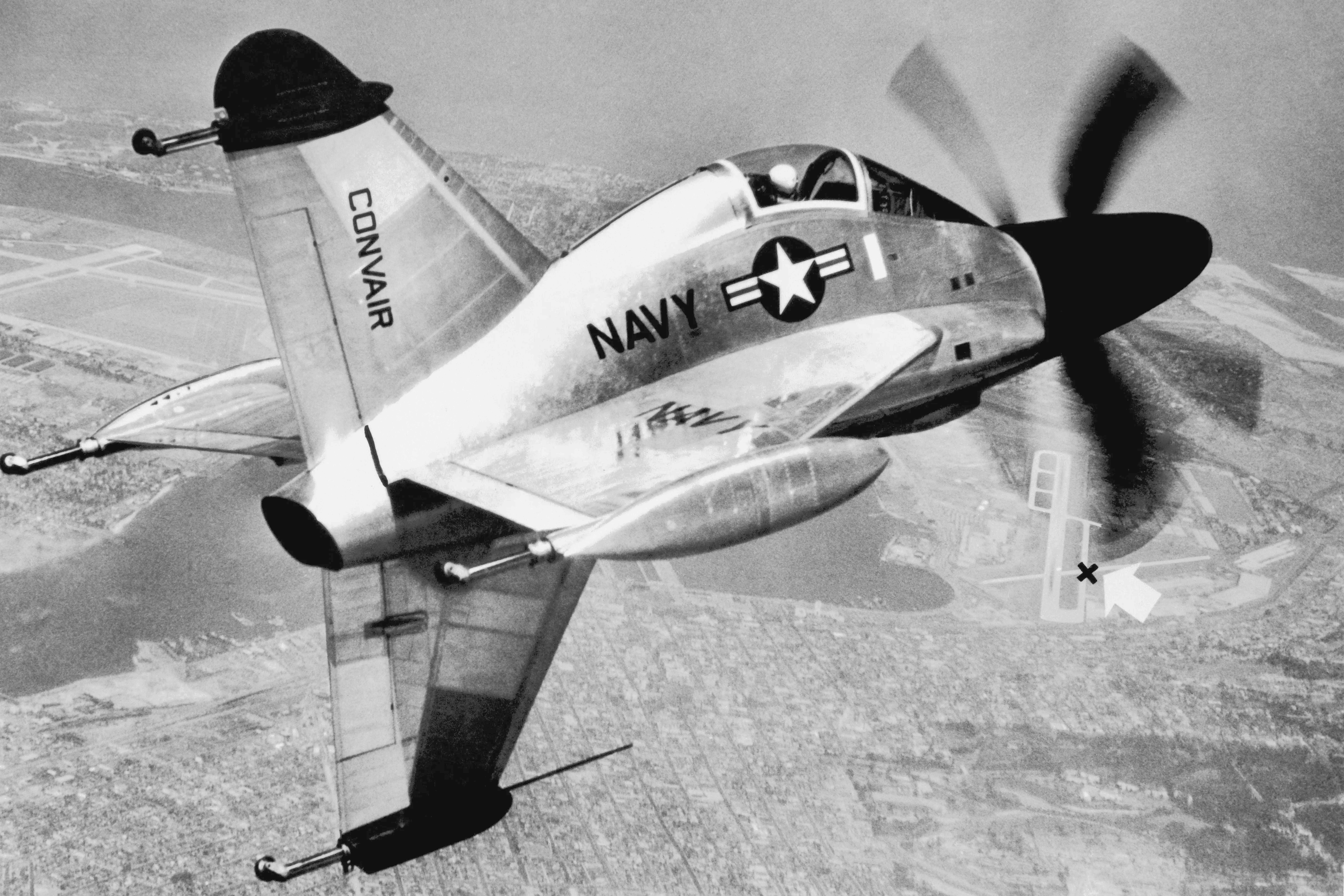

General information
- Type: Experimental VTOL fighter aircraft
- Manufacturer: Convair
- Primary user: United States Navy
- Number built: 1

History
- Manufactured: 1954
- First flight: 19 April 1954 (tethered); 1 August 1954 (free flight)

The Convair XFY-1 Pogo is an experimental V/STOL (vertical/short takeoff and landing) aircraft developed during the early years of the Cold War. It was intended to be a high-performance fighter aircraft capable of operating from small warships. Lockheed and Convair were awarded contracts to build experimental VTOL fighters, with Convair producing the XFY-1, also known as the "Pogo." It was developed as an attempt to create a practical V/STOL aircraft.

The XFY-1 featured a unique design with delta wings and three-bladed contra-rotating propellers powered by a turboprop engine. Test flights began in 1954, and the aircraft's capabilities were pushed to their limits. Challenges included difficulties in slowing down and landing at high speeds, as well as the need for highly skilled pilots due to its complex handling characteristics. Landing the XFY-1 was difficult, as the pilot had to look over his shoulder while carefully working the throttle to land.

Ultimately, technical and operational challenges, along with the superiority of jet-engined fighters, led to the project's suspension in 1955. The XFY-1 Pogo is now preserved in the National Air and Space Museum.

== Design and development ==
After World War II, the Cold War prompted the United States Army and Navy to study VTOL operations. It was envisaged to protect task forces, convoys or any fleet, even without aircraft carriers, by placing VTOL aircraft on any ship. These fighters would be housed within a conical protective housing, saving limited deck space available aboard ships. They would provide first line of airborne defense and reconnaissance capability, before more aircraft could be scrambled to help, with flight performance that helicopters could not provide.

In May 1951, Lockheed and Convair were awarded contracts in the attempt to design, construct, and test two experimental VTOL fighters that would be suitable for use by the armed forces. Although contract stipulations stated that each manufacturer have two fighters, each was only able to construct one, with Lockheed producing the XFV, and Convair producing the XFY, nicknamed the "Pogo", after the pogo stick. The first XFY-1 prototype was used for engine testing and the third for static testing, and only the second prototype serial number 138649 was flown.

The XFY-1 was designed for the Allison XT40-A-14 turboprop, which was expected to deliver 7,100 shp (5,295 kW). The production aircraft were intended to use the even more powerful Allison T54 which was never built. It was one of the few propeller-driven aircraft with delta wings, swept at 52 degrees, and a fin with a span of 21 ft 8 in (6.5 m). The pilot's seat was mounted on gimbals allowing for movement from 45 degrees in vertical flight to 90 degrees in horizontal flight. The Curtiss-Wright turbo-electric three-bladed contra-rotating propellers were 16 feet (4.88 m) in diameter.

== Operational history ==
=== Testing and evaluation ===
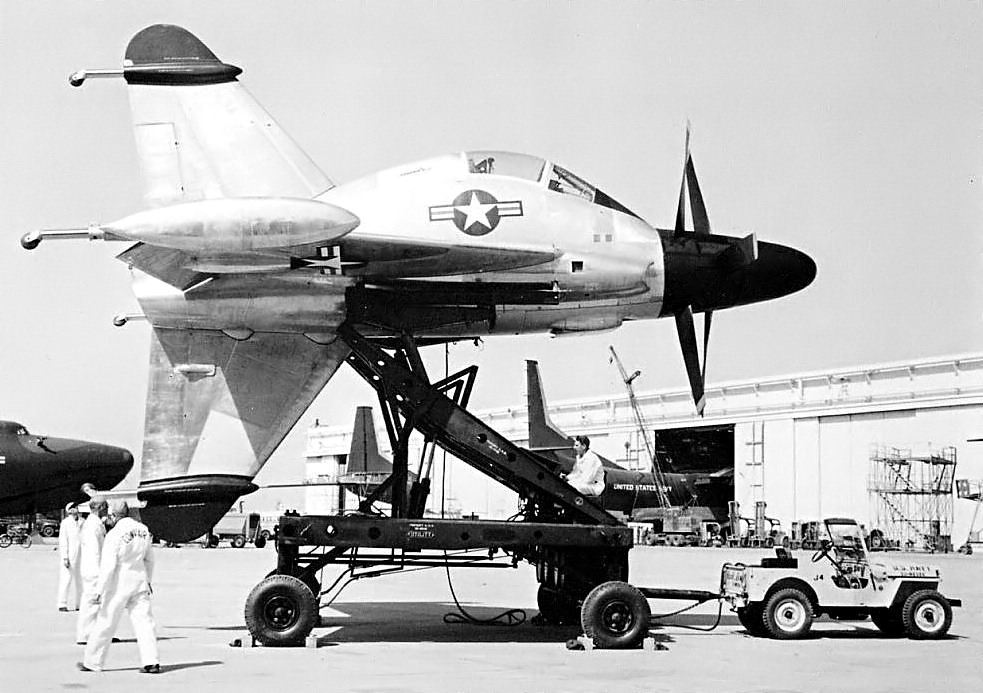
XFY on a launching cart

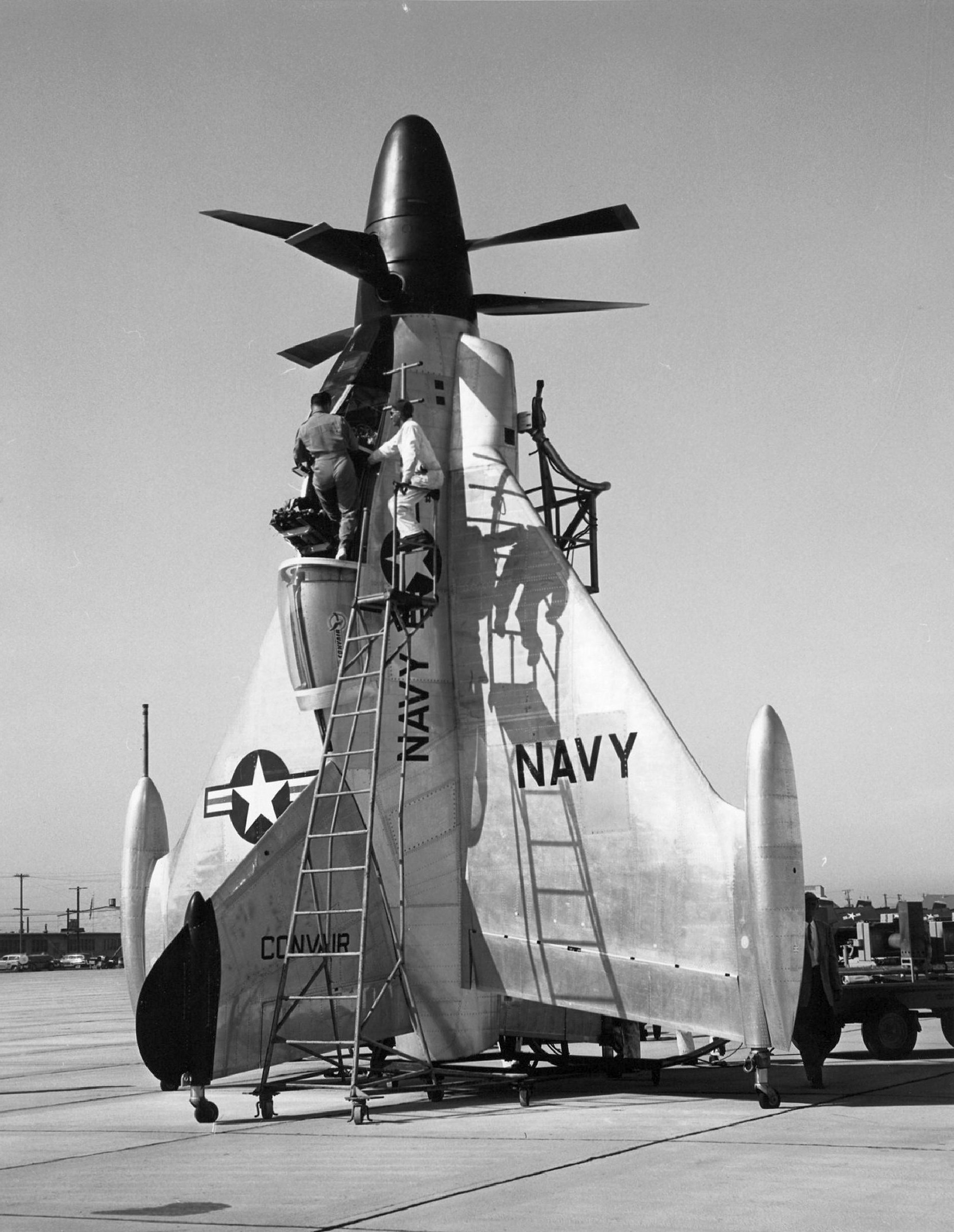
The XFY-1's pilot entering the aircraft via a ladder

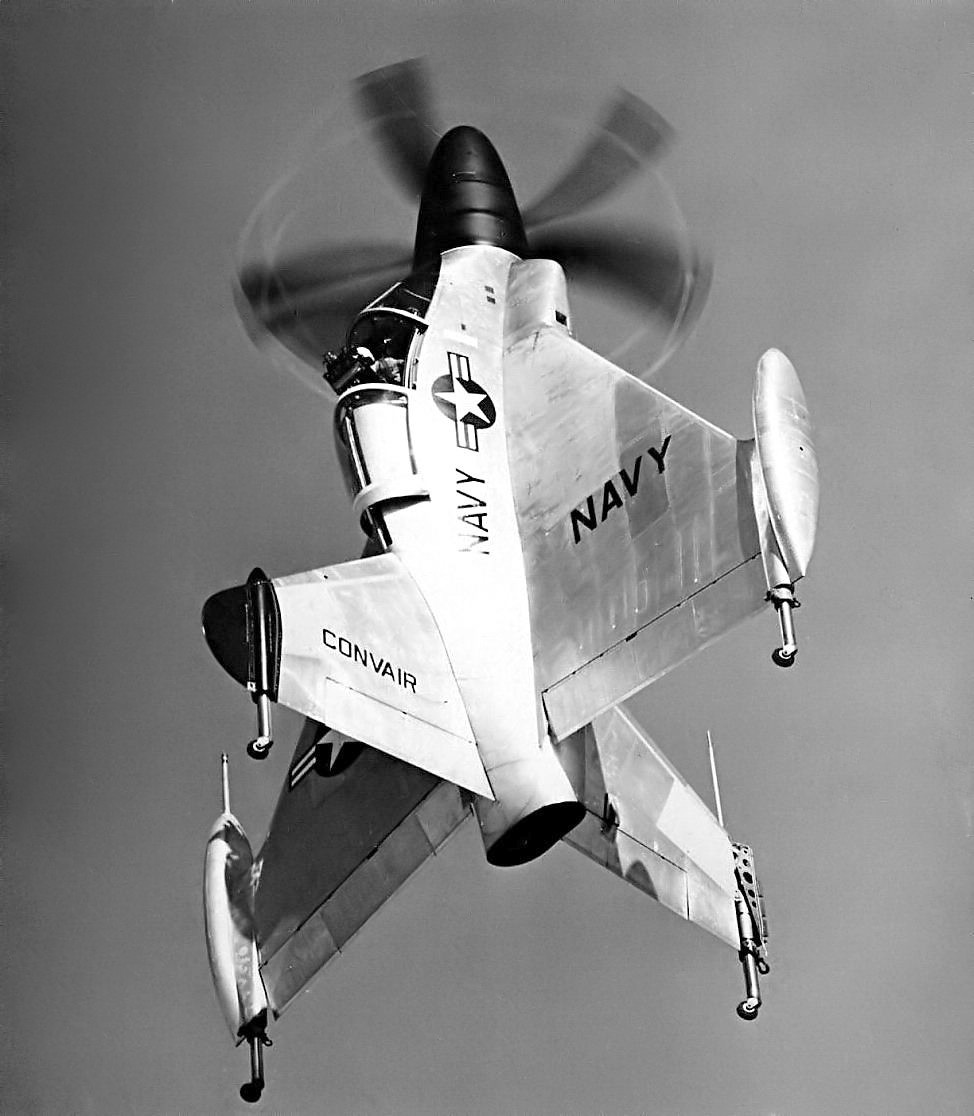
In vertical flight

External videos
- Takeoff, horizontal flight and Landing on YouTube of Convair XFY Pogo
- Shorter video on YouTube

On 19 April 1954, a Convair engineering test pilot and Marine reservist, Lieutenant Colonel James F. "Skeets" Coleman, made the first tethered flight in the Pogo. The XFY-1 was like no other propeller driven aircraft before it. No previous aircraft with a similar weight, engine power, or size had ever attempted to take off and land vertically. For the safety of both the craft and its pilot, the propeller hub cover was removed and replaced by safety tether lines for the first flight, in case Coleman lost control of the craft and would need to be tethered to prevent the craft falling to the ground. On the other end of the tether was another engineer, Bob McGreary. If Coleman ever lost control, McGreary controlled the winch which could be turned to raise the tethers to prevent the craft from plummeting to the ground. For further safety precautions, four security cables were fastened to each wing in case control was lost in any axis. The tests were conducted inside of a naval airship hangar at Moffett Field in Mountain View, California.

Throughout the next few weeks, Coleman logged almost 60 hours in test flights in the Pogo, and by August, the test was moved to outdoor conditions. On 1 August 1954, Coleman logged two outdoor test flights, the second flying 150 ft (50 m) into the air, and shortly after he flew 70 takeoff–landing drills at the Naval Auxiliary Air Station in Brown Field, California. The first conversion to horizontal flight took place on 5 November 1954. (Note: Note: This date is in dispute as various reliable sources give different dates of 2, 4 and 5 November 1954. One source indicates it was prior to "a widely publicized flight over downtown San Diego" on 2 November 1954.)

Upon later flights with longer durations, flaws in the design were found. Due to the Pogo's lightweight design, and the lack of spoilers and air brakes, the aircraft lacked the ability to slow down and stop efficiently after moving at high speeds. Landing was also a problem, as the pilot had to look back behind himself during a landing to properly stabilize the craft.

It became evident that even if technical problems could be overcome, such VTOL aircraft would be flown only by the most experienced pilots. Thus, it was not feasible to place VTOL fighters—as previously hoped for—on every ship. Also, whereas jet-engined fighters had top speeds that approached Mach 2, the turboprop VTOL fighter was at a disadvantage with a top speed below Mach 1. Due to these problems, the XFY Project was put on hiatus.

=== Later testing ===
Although a test flight was made on 19 May 1955, it again ended with failure, and on 1 August 1955 the project was formally concluded. The last flight of the XFY-1 Pogo took place in November 1956.

== Aircraft on display ==
After several years on static display at Naval Air Station Norfolk, Virginia, the Pogo was moved to the National Air and Space Museum in Suitland, Maryland, where it currently resides.

== Specifications (XFY-1) ==
General characteristics

- Crew: 1
- Airfoil: NACA 63-009 mod
- Propellers: 6-bladed Curtiss Electric constant-speed contra-rotating propeller

Performance

- Power/mass: 0.34 hp/lb (0.56 kW/kg)

Armament

- Guns: 4 × 20mm (0.79 in) cannon
- Rockets: 48 × 2.75 in (70 mm) Mk 4 Folding-Fin Aerial Rockets

== See also ==
- VTOL

Aircraft of comparable role, configuration, and era

- Focke-Wulf Triebflügel
- Heinkel Lerche
- Lockheed XFV
- Coleopter § Convair Model 49

Related lists

- List of experimental aircraft
- List of fighter aircraft
- List of United States Navy aircraft designations (pre-1962)
- List of military aircraft of the United States
