= Westland WG.22 =

Proposed tiltwing transport

WG.22

General information
- Type: Tiltwing Aircraft
- National origin: United Kingdom
- Status: Abandoned
- Number built: 0

The WG.22 was a proposed tiltwing convertiplane transport aircraft concept designed by Westland Aircraft in 1968, which was to be powered by four turboshaft engines.

== See also ==
- Canadair CL-84 Dynavert
- Hiller X-18
- LTV XC-142
