= NASA GL-10 Greased Lightning =

American unmanned aircraft

GL-10 Greased Lightning
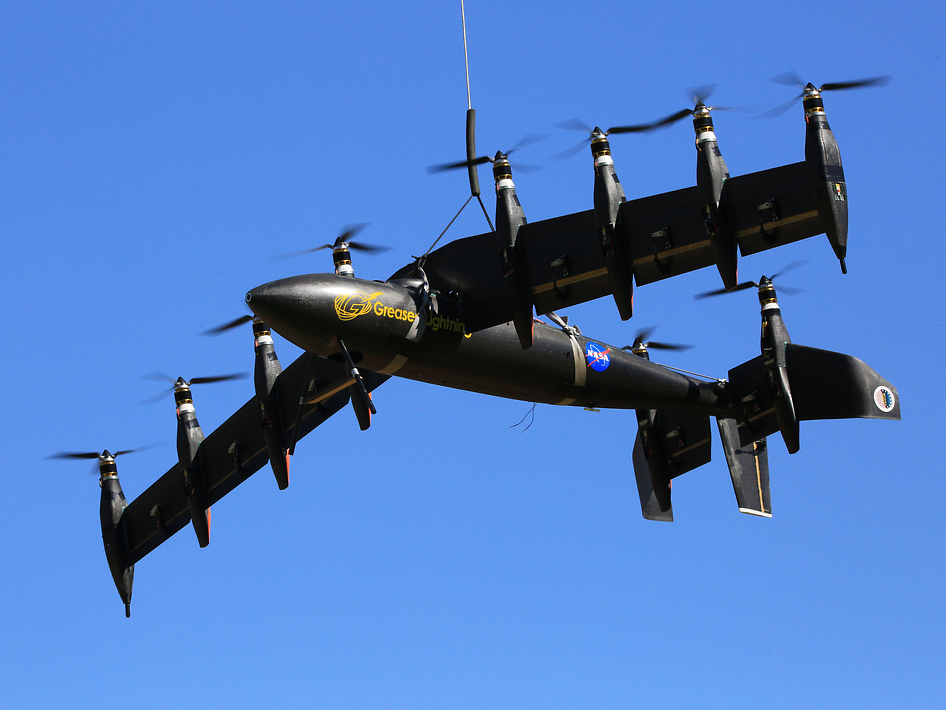
- GL-10 Greased Lightning 50% scale prototype

General information
- Type: Hybrid UAV
- National origin: United States
- Status: In development
- Number built: 1

History
- Introduction date: 2014
- First flight: 19 August 2014 (tethered)

The GL-10 Greased Lightning is a hybrid diesel-electric tiltwing unmanned aircraft.

== Development ==
The wing has eight electric motor-driven propellers, while the horizontal stabilizer has two. In the future full-scale version, power will be generated by two 6 kW (8 hp) diesel engines which will charge lithium-ion batteries. The propellers on the leading edge of the wing provide high speed flow, and thus lift, on the wing even in low forward velocity flight allowing pitch, roll, and yaw control authority during the critical transition phase from hover to forward flight.

The VTOL capability of this new class of UAV eliminates the requirement for additional ground support equipment like launch catapults and landing catch mechanisms. In addition, the propellers are designed for a relatively low tip speed resulting in a marked reduction in noise. The aircraft is designed to complete several vertical take-off and landings during its mission with a loiter endurance of 24 hours in the forward flight mode. The GL-10 performed transitions between vertical and horizontal flight in 2015.

The Greased Lightning was followed by the Langley Aerodrome No. 8 (LA-8), a tandem-wing, deflected-slipstream (demonstrated in the late 1950s by the Ryan VZ-3 Vertiplane) design with four propellers on each wing for urban air mobility, tested in a Low-Speed Wind Tunnel before flight tests in late August 2019.

== Full scale specifications (GL-10) ==
Data from NASA

General characteristics

- Crew: 0
- Wingspan: 10 ft (3.0 m)
- Powerplant: 10 × electric-powered propellers
- Powerplant: 2 × diesel prime movers driving generators , 8 hp (6.0 kW) each

Performance

== See also ==
- List of electric aircraft
- Canadair CL-84 Dynavert
- Hiller X-18
- LTV XC-142
