= GL-10 =

GL-10 may refer to:

- NASA GL-10 Greased Lightning, a hybrid diesel-electric tiltwing aircraft
- Subaru Leone, a Japanese-made compact car also called the Subaru GL-10
