= Grumman G-21 Goose =

Amphibious flying boat

G-21/JRF Goose
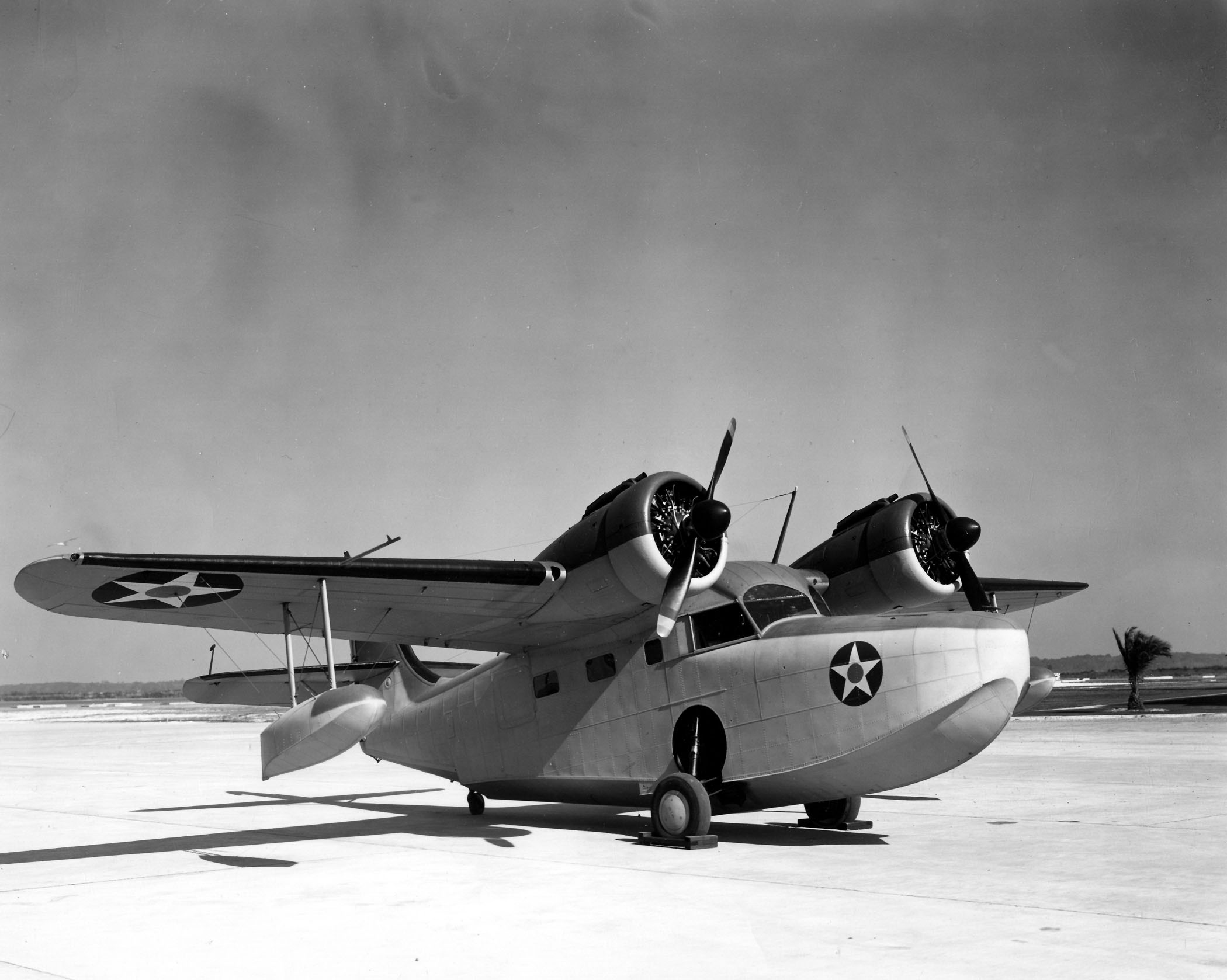

General information
- Type: Transport amphibious aircraft
- Manufacturer: Grumman
- Primary users: United States Navy United States Army Air Forces; Royal Air Force; Royal Canadian Air Force
- Number built: 345

History
- First flight: 29 May 1937
- Variant: Kaman K-16B

The Grumman G-21 Goose is an amphibious flying boat designed by Grumman as an eight-seat commuter aircraft for businessmen in the Long Island area. The Goose was Grumman's first monoplane to fly, its first twin-engined aircraft, and its first aircraft to enter commercial airline service. During World War II, the Goose became an effective transport for the US military (including the United States Coast Guard), as well as serving with many other air forces. During hostilities, the Goose took on an increasing number of combat and training roles.

== Design and development ==
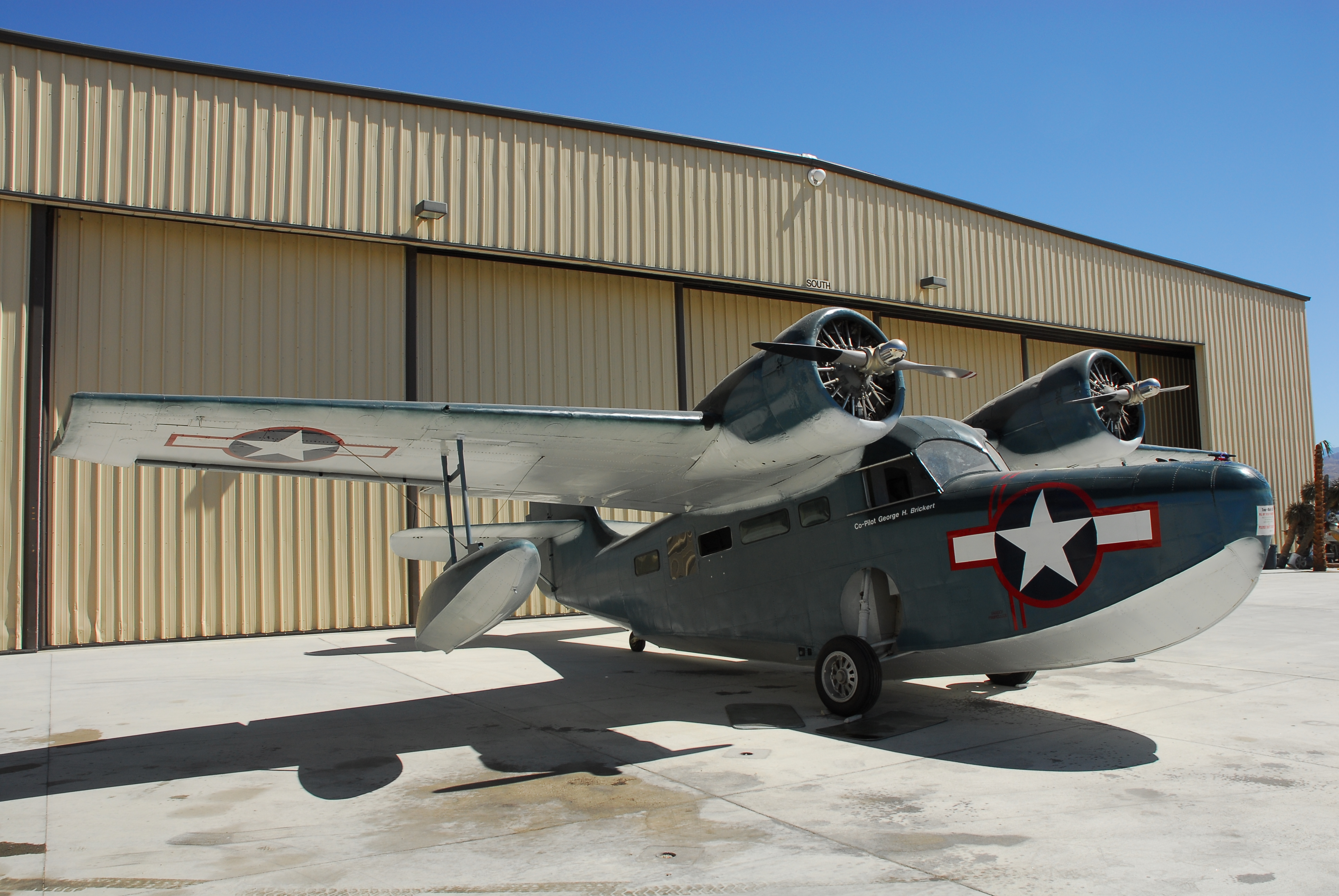
Preserved ex-British JRF-6B Goose in U.S. Navy JRF-1 markings

In 1936, a group of wealthy residents of Long Island, including E. Roland Harriman, approached Grumman and commissioned an aircraft that they could use to fly to New York City. In response, the Grumman Model G-21 was designed as a light amphibious transport. Grumman produced a high-wing monoplane of almost all-metal construction—the trailing half of the main wing and all of the flight control surfaces except for the flaps were fabric-covered. It was powered by two 450 horsepower (340 kW) Pratt & Whitney R-985 Wasp Junior nine-cylinder, air-cooled, radial engines mounted on the leading edges of the wings. The deep fuselage served also as a hull and was equipped with hand-cranked retractable landing gear. First flight of the prototype took place on May 29, 1937.

The fuselage also proved versatile, as it provided generous interior space that allowed fitting for either a transport or luxury airliner role. Having an amphibious configuration also allowed the G-21 to go just about anywhere, and plans were made to market it as an amphibian airliner.

=== Modifications ===
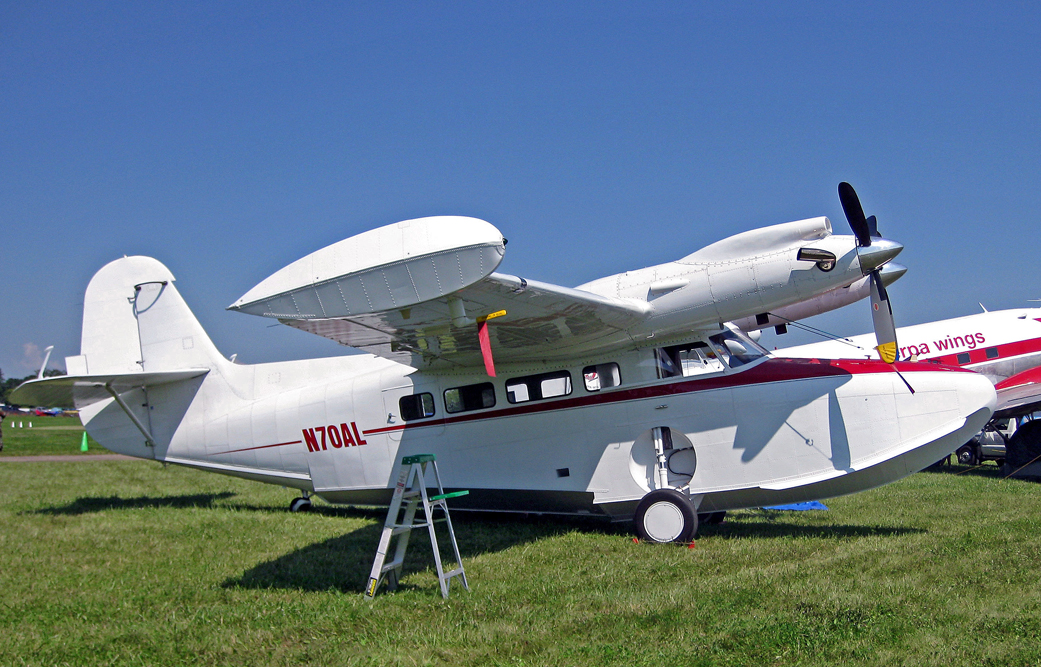
McKinnon G-21G Turbo Goose conversion with 680 shp (510 kW) Pratt & Whitney Canada PT6A-27 turboprops

A number of modifications were made for the Goose, but the most numerous are those by McKinnon Enterprises of Sandy, Oregon, which holds 21 supplemental type certificates (STCs) for modifying G-21-series aircraft and which also manufactured four different conversions that were recertified under a separate FAA type certificate as brand-new "McKinnon" airplanes. The first was the McKinnon model G-21C which involved replacing the original R-985 radial engines with four Lycoming GSO-480-B2D6 piston engines. It was approved under TC 4A24 on November 7, 1958, and two examples were converted in 1958–1959.

=== New production ===
In November 2007, Antilles Seaplanes of Gibsonville, North Carolina, announced it was restarting production of the turbine-powered McKinnon G-21G Turbo Goose variant, now identified as the Antilles G-21G Super Goose. Pratt & Whitney Canada PT6A-34 turboprops flat-rated to 680 shp (510 kW) would have replaced the original PT6A-27 engines, and the airframe systems and especially the avionics (aviation electronics – i.e. radios and navigation systems) would have been updated with state-of-the-art "glass panel" instrumentation and cockpit displays. However, as of 2009, Antilles Seaplanes' manufacturing center has been foreclosed and sold at auction. The fate of new Goose production is currently unknown.

== Operational history ==
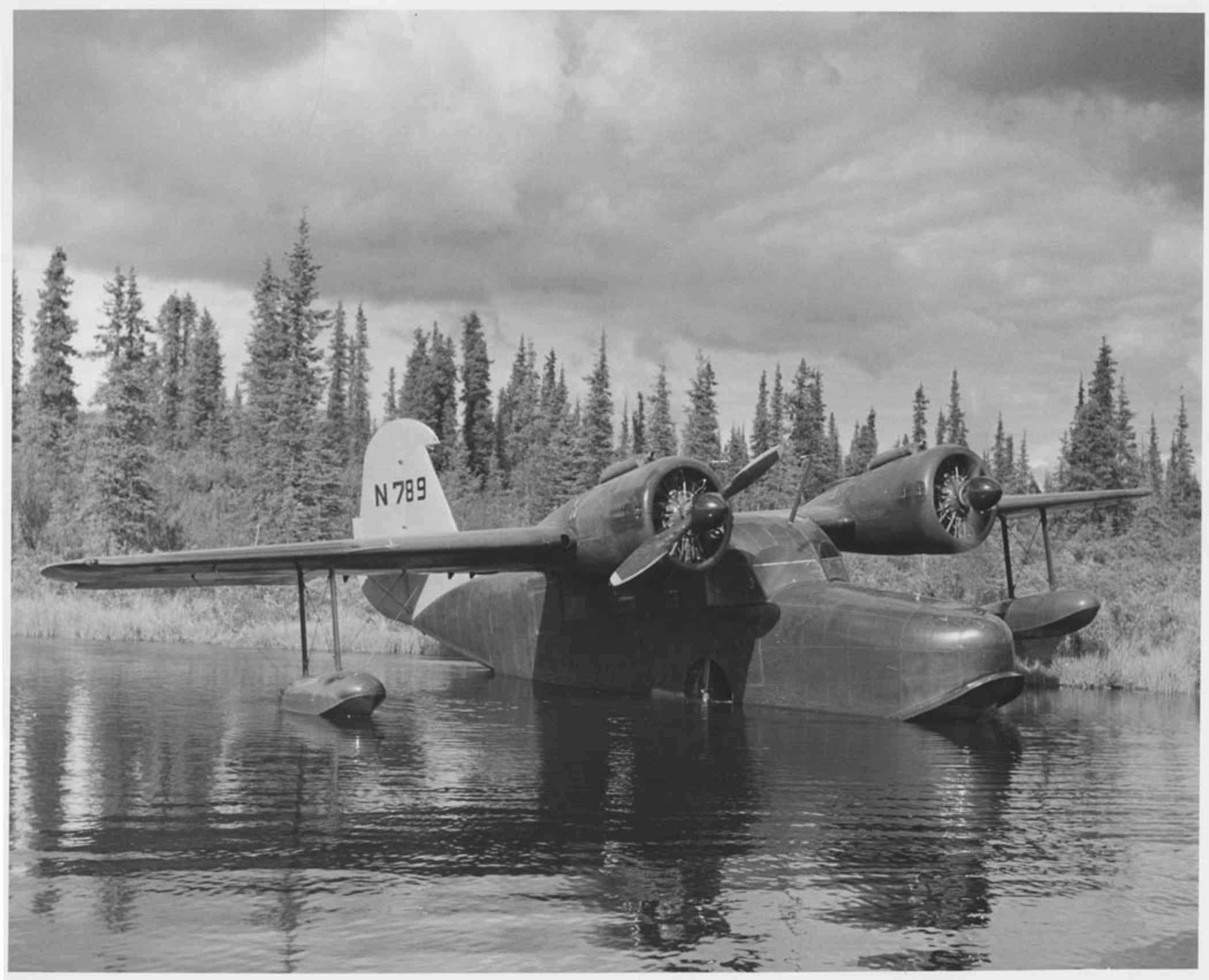
A Grumman Goose on the water

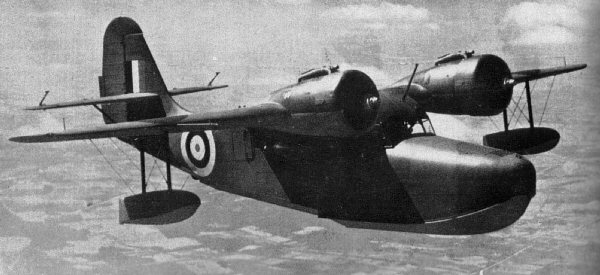
Royal Canadian Air Force Goose

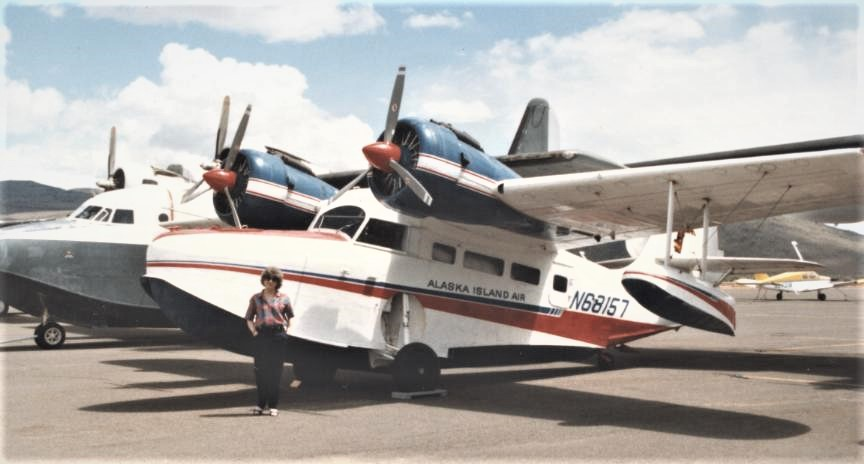
Alaska Island Air G-21A in 1989

Envisioned as corporate or private flying yachts for Manhattan millionaires, initial production models normally carried two to three passengers and had a bar and small toilet installed. In addition to being marketed to small air carriers, the G-21 was also promoted as a military transport. In 1938, the U.S. Army Air Corps purchased the type as the OA-9 (later, in the war years, examples impressed from civilian ownership were designated the OA-13A). The most numerous of the military versions were the United States Navy variants, designated the JRF.

The amphibious aircraft was also adopted by the Coast Guard and, during World War II, served with the Royal Canadian Air Force in the transport, reconnaissance, rescue, and training roles. The G-21 was used for air-sea rescue duties by the Fleet Air Arm, who assigned the name Goose. A single aircraft was used briefly by No. 1 Air Ambulance Unit, Royal Australian Air Force in the Mediterranean.[21]

After the war, the Goose found continued commercial use in locations from Alaska to Catalina and the Caribbean.

A total of 345 were built, with about 30 known to still be airworthy today (although around 60 are still on various civil registries, many of them are known to have crashed or been otherwise destroyed), most being in private ownership, some of them operating in modified forms.

== Variants ==
G-21
The original production version, these were powered by two 450 hp (340 kW) Pratt & Whitney Wasp Junior SB engines, at 7,500 lb (3,400 kg) gross weight, with six passengers, and 12 were built, all converted to G-21A standards.
G-21A
Increased gross weight (8,000 lb (3,600 kg)), 30 built. 2-bladed Hartzell constant speed propellers.
G-21B
Export coastal patrol flying boat armed with .30 in (7.62 mm) machine gun in bow and dorsal hatches and two 100 lb (45 kg) bombs underwing, 12 built for Portuguese Naval Aviation.
G-21C
Conversion by McKinnon Enterprises, these were re-engined with four 340 hp (250 kW) Lycoming GSO-480-B2D6 air-cooled, geared, and supercharged flat-six engines and fitted with retractable wingtip floats, a fiberglass radar nose, a one-piece wraparound windshield, and enlarged cabin windows; gross weight increased to 12,499 lb (5,669 kg) as result of internal structural reinforcements. Two were converted as piston-powered models G-21C in 1958–1959, and two other airframes subsequently were converted in 1968, but with two 550 shp (410 kW) Pratt & Whitney Canada PT6A-20 turboprops per STC SA1320WE as G-21C Hybrids. Two G-21C Hybrids were identical to the later 10,500 lb (4,800 kg) model G-21E, but they were never certified as such.
G-21D
One G-21C was further converted by McKinnon with an extended nose marked by two extra windows on each side and accommodating another four passengers. Recertified as G-21D in 1960. In 1966, it was re-engined with two 550 shp (410 kW) PT6A-20 turboprops and fitted with revised Alvarez-Calderon electric flaps in accordance with STC SA1320WE, retaining the G-21D designation, but subsequently identified as the McKinnon "Turboprop Goose".
G-21E
A fully certified new model, it was based on a simplified turbine conversion of the McKinnon G-21C, with 550 shp (410 kW) PT6A-20 engines (680 shp (510 kW) Pratt & Whitney Canada PT6A-27 engines optional) and more fuel, but without all of the structural reinforcements of the G-21C. 10,500 lb (4,800 kg) gross weight. One converted.
G-21G
The final McKinnon conversion also was fully certified as a new model with 680 shp (510 kW) PT6A-27 engines, 586 US gal (2,220 L; 488 imp gal) of fuel, and 12,500 lb (5,700 kg) gross weight. Two converted.

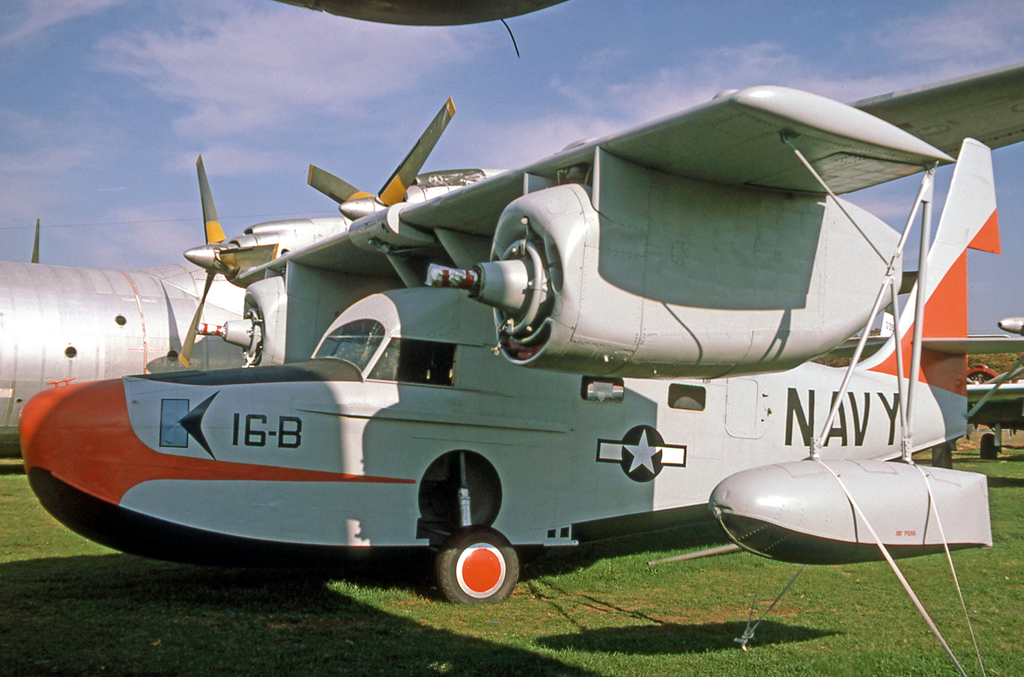
The sole Kaman K-16B tilt-wing STOL research aircraft

Kaman K-16B
Experimental tilt wing aircraft, with JRF-5 fuselage powered by two General Electric YT58-GE-2A engines; one built but not flown.
XJ3F-1
Prototype eight-seat utility amphibian, built for the US Navy; one built in 1938.
JRF-1
Production XJ3F-1, five built for US Navy.
JRF-1A
Similar to JRF-1, but with target towing gear and camera hatch added, five built for US Navy.
JRF-2
U.S. Coast Guard version with provisions for carrying stretchers; seven built.
JRF-3
Similar to the JRF-2, fitted with autopilot and deicing boots on the wing leading edges for Arctic operations. Three built for US Coast Guard.
JRF-4
Similar to JRF-1A, these could carry two underwing depth bombs. Ten built for US Navy.

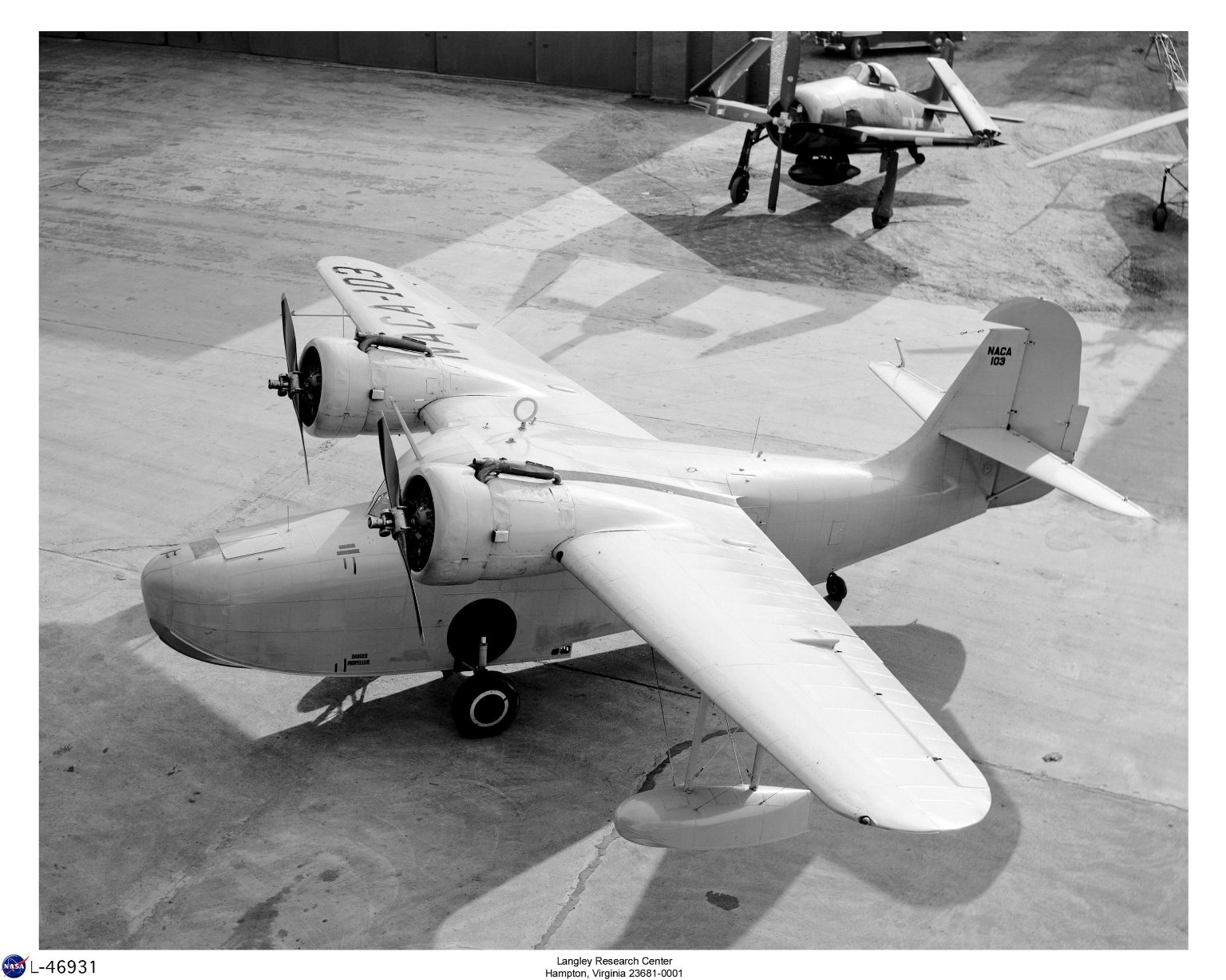
Grumman JRF-5

JRF-5
Major production version with bomb racks, target towing and camera gear, and deicing gear; 184 built. In 1953, a modified JRF-5 tested hydroskis for the US Navy.
JRF-5G
24 JRF-5s transferred to the US Coast Guard.
JRF-6B
Navigation trainer purchased for supply under Lend-Lease; 50 built.
OA-9
Transport and air-sea rescue for United States Army Air Forces, 26 ordered in 1938, supplemented by five JRF-6Bs under the same designation.
OA-13A
Three G-21As impressed by the USAAF.
OA-13B
Two JRF-5s transferred to the USAAF.
Goose Mk.I
British designation for three JRF-5s supplied to the Fleet Air Arm.
Goose Mk.IA
British designation for 44 JRF-6Bs, supplied under Lend Lease for observer training by the 749 Naval Air Squadron in Trinidad.
Goose Mk.II
British designation for two JRF-5s staff transports for British Air Commission in the United States and Canada.

== Operators ==
=== Military operators ===
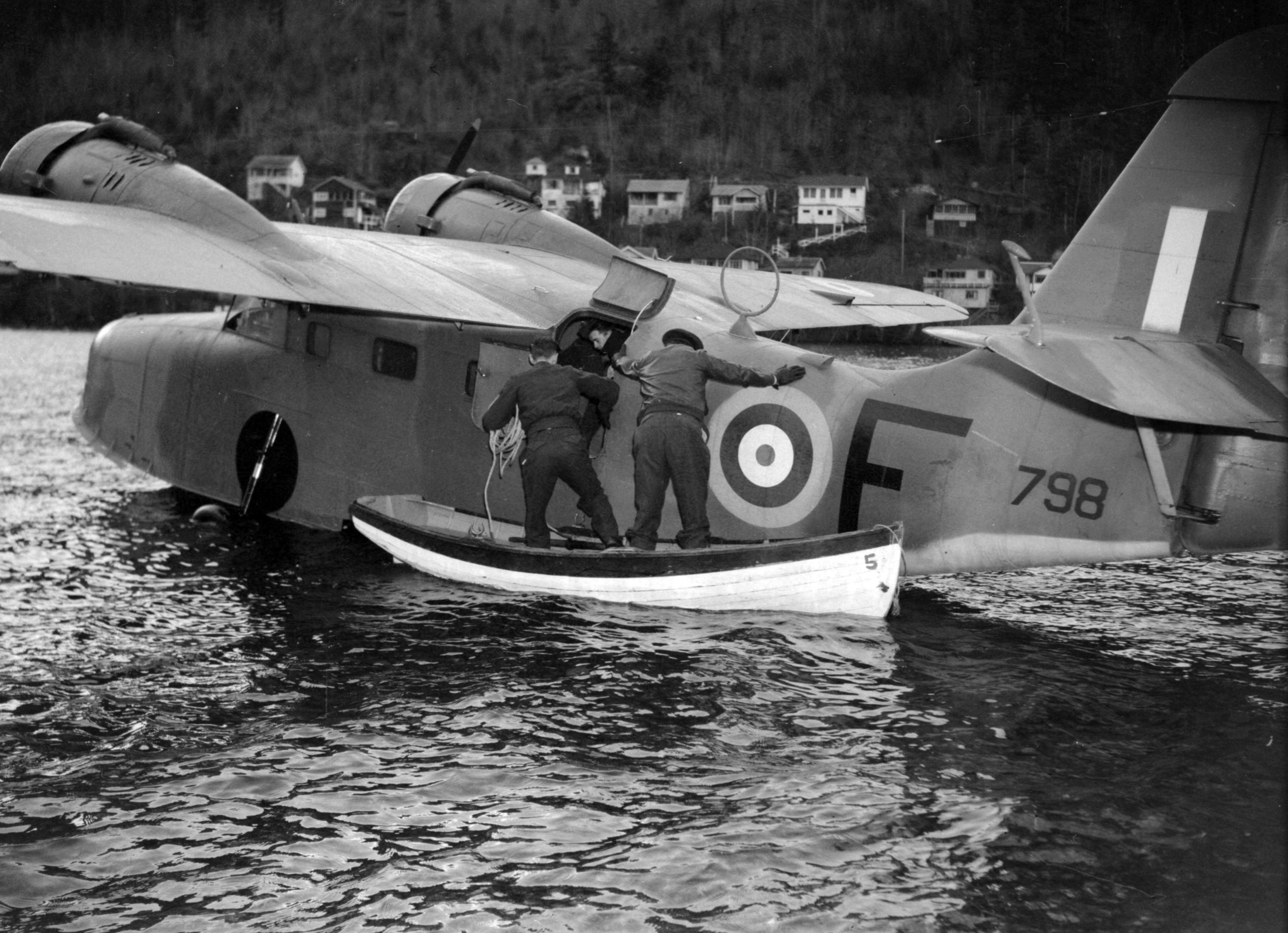
Royal Canadian Air Force Goose

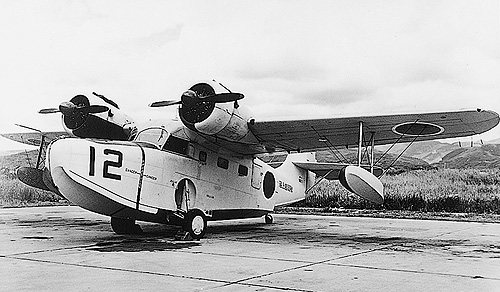
Japan Maritime Self-Defense Force JRF-5

Argentina

- Argentine Naval Aviation
  - Six aircraft were used 1947–1966.

Australia

- Royal Australian Air Force
  - A single aircraft was used briefly by No. 1 Air Ambulance Unit RAAF in the Mediterranean.

Bolivia

- Bolivian Air Force
  - At least two aircraft (one JRF-2 and one JRF-6B) received in 1942.

Brazil

  - 10 used for anti-submarine patrols during Second World War.

Canada

- Royal Canadian Air Force
  - 36 received.

Cuba
France
Honduras

- Honduran Air Force

Indonesia

- Indonesian Air Force

Japan

- Japan Maritime Self-Defense Force

Paraguay

- Paraguayan Naval Aviation

Peru

- Peruvian Air Force

Portugal

- Portuguese Naval Aviation
- Portuguese Air Force

Sweden

- Swedish Air Force

United Kingdom

- Royal Air Force (several impressed examples by 24 Squadron and ATA)
- Royal Navy (44 Lend Lease examples)

United States

- United States Army Air Corps
- United States Army Air Forces
- United States Navy
- United States Coast Guard

=== Civil Government operators ===
United States

- The United States Fish and Wildlife Service and the Bureau of Land Management each operated several G-21 aircraft.

Canada

- Royal Canadian Mounted Police

=== Civil operators ===
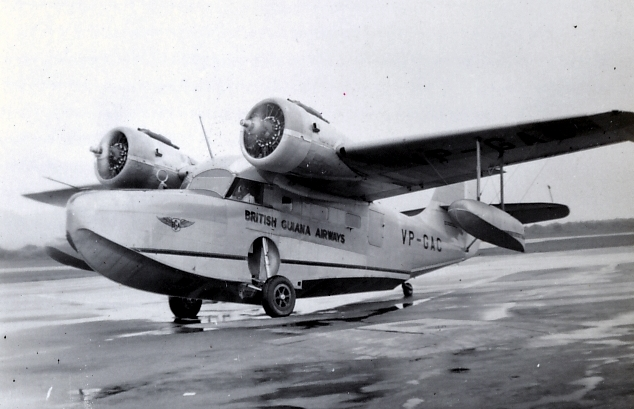
British Guiana Airways Grumman Goose circa 1955. Piarco Airport, Trinidad.

Australia

- Asiatic Petroleum

British Guiana

- British Guiana Airways

Canada

- Pacific Coastal Airlines
- Wilderness Seaplanes

Croatia

- European Coastal Airlines

Dutch East Indies

- Koninklijke Nederlandsch-Indische Luchtvaart Maatschappij

Fiji

- Yaukuve Resort

Iceland

- Loftleiðir

Indonesia

- Airfast Indonesia
- Merpati Nusantara Airlines – Leased a Goose from Indonesian Air Force.
- SAATAS-East Indonesia

New Zealand

- Mount Cook Airline
- Sea Bee Air

Norway

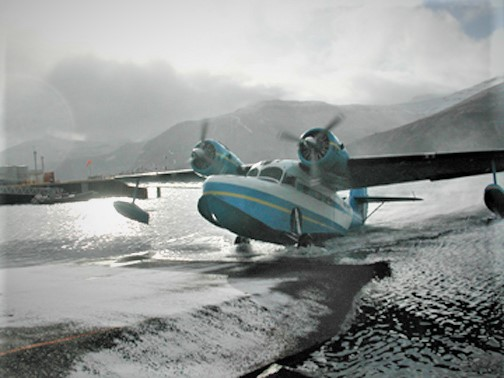
PenAir Goose at Akutan, Alaska, 2006

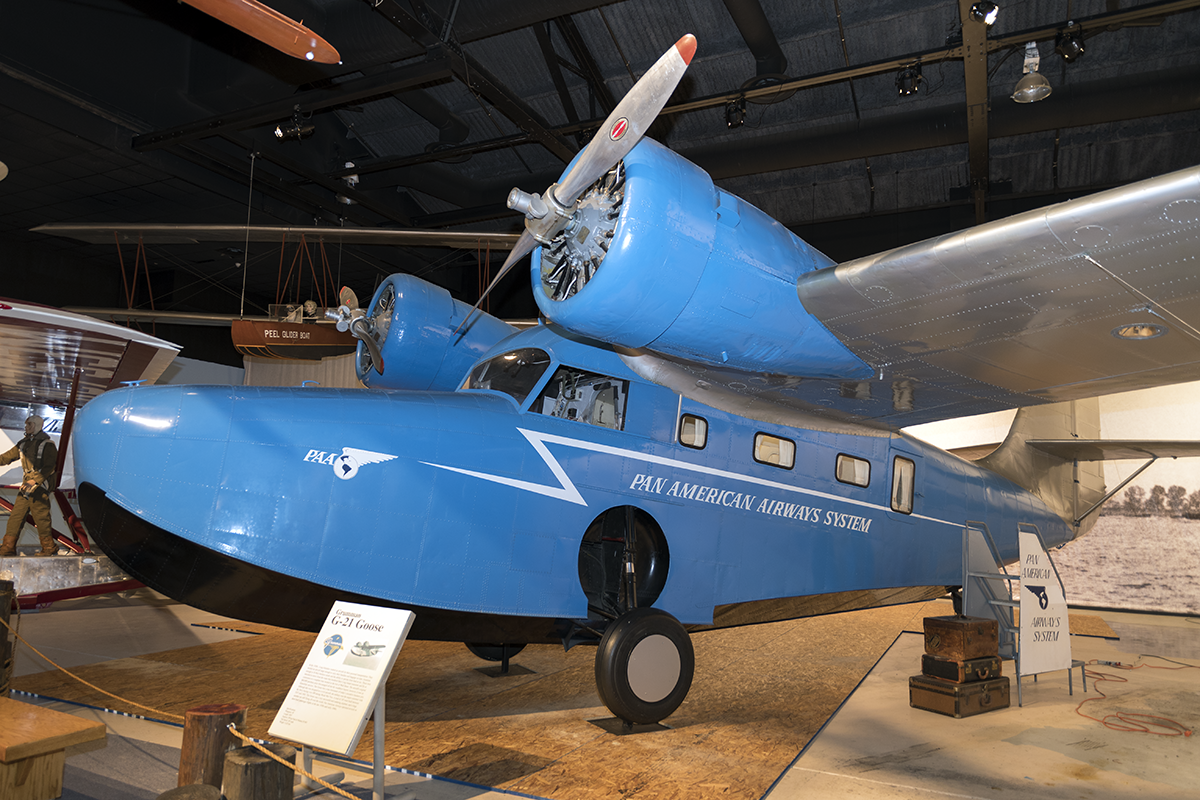
Goose in Pan Am colors at the Cradle of Aviation Museum, Long Island.

United States

- Alaska Airlines – Alaska Airlines called their turboprop-powered aircraft the "Turbo Goose" propjet. They also operated piston-powered versions.
- Alaska Coastal Airlines
- Alaska Coastal-Ellis Airlines
- Alaska Island Air
- Alaska Fish and Game
- Amphib. Inc.
- Antilles Air Boats
- Avalon Air Transport
- Catalina Air
- Catalina Channel Airlines
- Chevron of California
- Devcon Construction
- Flight Data Inc.
- Ford Motor Co.
- Gulf Oil
- Kodiak Airways
- Kodiak Western
- North Coast Aero
- Ozark Management
- Pan Air
- PenAir
- Reeve Aleutian Airways
- SouthEast Skyways
- Superior Oil
- Sun Oil Co. (Sunoco)
- Teufel Nurseries
- The Texas Company (Texaco)
- Tuthill Corporation
- Virgin Islands Seaplane Shuttle
- Webber Airlines

== Accidents and incidents ==
19 November 1943
Grumman JRF-2 of Port Heiden, Alaska (USCG), crashed with three crewmen and one passenger missing. It was found in 1987.
13 March 1947
A Grumman JRF-6B of Loftleiðir with a pilot and seven passengers crashed immediately after takeoff on Hvammsfjörður by the town of Búðardalur in Iceland. The pilot and four passengers evacuated the plane and were rescued by a boat, but one of those passengers later died. Three of the original seven passengers died in the crash.
21 August 1958
N720 crashed in the Brooks Range, near the upper Ivishak River, in Alaska, killing U.S. Fish and Wildlife Agents Clarence J. Rhode and Stanley Fredericksen, and Clarence's son Jack. The crash site was not found until August 23, 1979.
27 January 1961
A JRF-5 of the French Navy crashed, killing Admiral Pierre Ponchardier and five others. This accident led the French Navy to retire all of their Grumman JRF-5 Gooses in the spring of 1961.
30 July 1971
One person was killed and one was injured when a Grumman G-21A taking off from the airport in Greenville, Maine experienced engine malfunction during takeoff. The NTSB determined the probable cause to be the pilot's lack of familiarity with the plane and fuel mismanagement.
22 June 1972
N1513V of Reeve Aleutian Airways was written off at False Pass, Alaska.
25 August 1978
All 11 people aboard a Webber Airlines seaplane were killed when the Grumman Goose crashed on as it was preparing to land at Labouchere Bay on Prince of Wales Island after a 75 miles (121 km) flight from Ketchikan, Alaska.
2 September 1978
Charles F. Blair Jr., former Naval Air Transport Service and Pan American Airways pilot and husband to actress Maureen O'Hara, was flying a Grumman Goose that belonged to his company, Antilles Air Boats, from St. Croix to St. Thomas in the U.S. Virgin Islands when it crashed into the ocean due to failure of the left engine. He and three passengers were killed; seven passengers were severely injured.
24 July 1984
Grumman Goose G-21A, Serial # B-114, Registration: N 2021 A, Hal’s Air Service, Piloted by Hal Dierich, Four Fatalities including pilot. Collision with water in the narrow strait NW of Monashka Bay near Ouzinkie, Kodiak Island, AK.
15 February 2005
A 1939 Grumman Goose G-21A, registered N-327, crashed around 9:30 am in a field on Route 14A near Penn Yan, New York after an engine failure simulation went wrong. The plane fell rapidly, with the left wing hitting the ground first, before the badly damaged plane burst into flames on impact. Pilots Paul and Daryl Middlebrook, both of Penn Yan, escaped serious injury. The plane, originally owned by the Peruvian Air Force, had starred in the 1980s ABC television series Tales of the Gold Monkey as Cutter's Goose.
3 August 2008
A Grumman Goose of Pacific Coastal Airlines with seven passengers and crew crashed during a flight from Port Hardy to Chamiss Bay. The aircraft was completely destroyed by fire. There were only two survivors.
16 November 2008
A Grumman Goose of Pacific Coastal Airlines with eight passengers and crew crashed on South Thormanby Island near Sechelt off British Columbia's Sunshine Coast in bad weather during a flight from Vancouver International Airport to Toba Inlet, BC. Only one passenger survived. The company resumed floatplane operations on November 19, 2008.
27 February 2011
A turbine Goose, N221AG, crashed in the United Arab Emirates when it veered immediately after takeoff.
17 June 2014
A Grumman G-21A Goose lost control in a snowstorm over the Montana/Idaho border and crashed into the parking lot of the Lost Trail Ski Area near the summit of Lost Trail Pass, subsequently catching fire. The plane was completely destroyed, and the pilot, who was the only occupant of the plane, was killed.
18 December 2023
A Grumman Goose operated by Wilderness Seaplanes crashed shortly after takeoff from Bella Bella, British Columbia on its way to Port Hardy, British Columbia. The plane was transporting the pilot and four fish farm workers. All survived with minor injuries.

== Aircraft on display ==
Canada

- B-77 – G-21A in storage at the Canada Aviation and Space Museum in Ottawa, Ontario.

Indonesia

- PB-521 – G-21A on static display at Suryadarma Air Force Base in Subang Regency, West Java.

Sweden

- 37810 – JRF-5 under restoration for static display at the Swedish Air Force Museum in Linköping, Östergötland.

United States

- 1048 – G-21A on static display at the Steven F. Udvar-Hazy Center of the National Air and Space Museum in Chantilly, Virginia.
- 1086 – G-21A on static display at the National Naval Aviation Museum in Pensacola, Florida.
- 1157 – G-21A under restoration for static display at the Tongass Historical Society in Ketchikan, Alaska.
- B-102 – G-21A on display at the Alaska Aviation Museum in Anchorage, Alaska.
- B-122 – G-21A on static display at the Evergreen Aviation & Space Museum in McMinnville, Oregon.
- B-130 – G-21A on static display at the Historic Aircraft Restoration Project in Brooklyn, New York.
- Reproduction – G-21A on static display at the Cradle of Aviation Museum in Garden City, New York.

== Specifications (JRF-5 Goose) ==
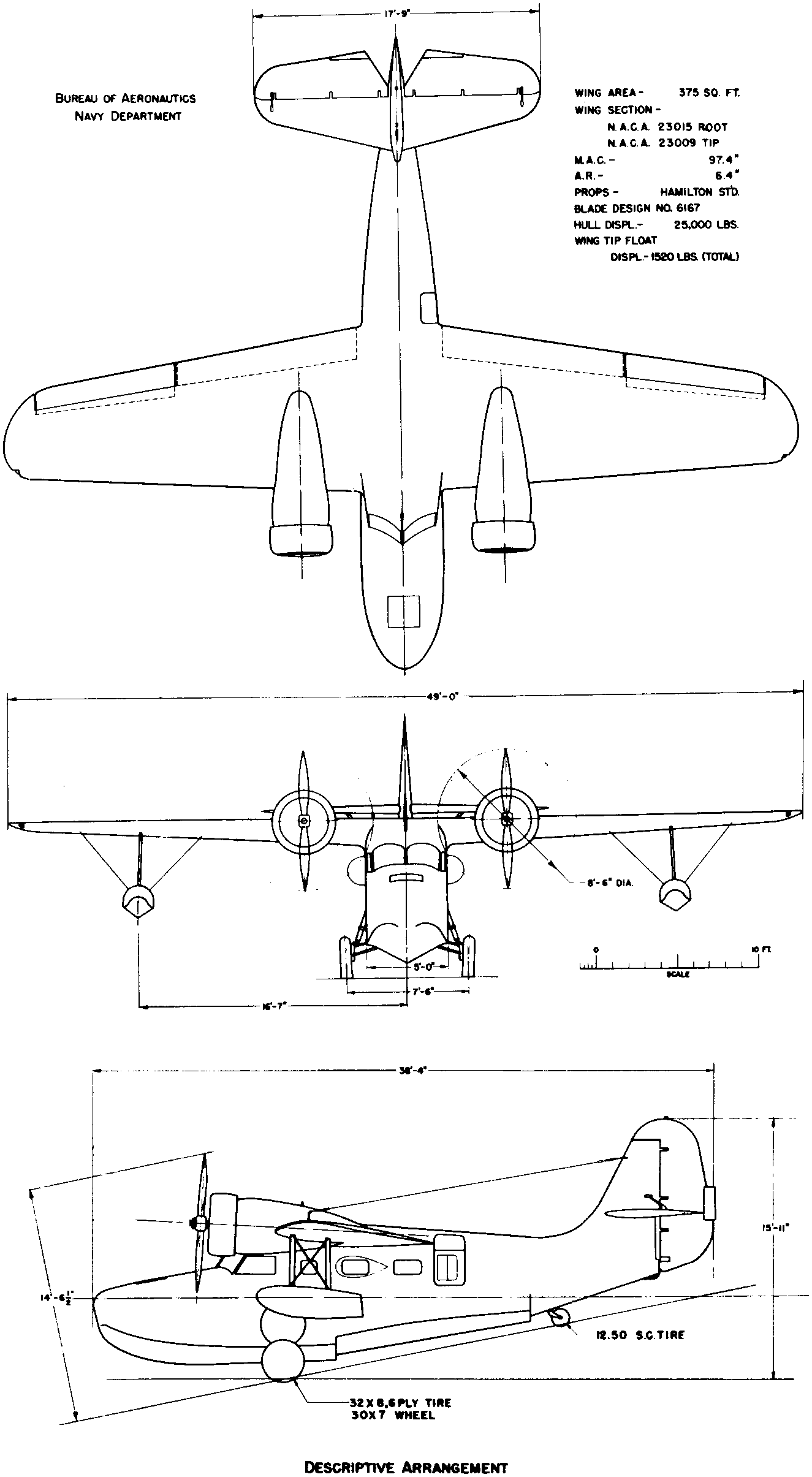
3-view line drawing of the Grumman JRF-5 Goose

Data from United States Navy Aircraft since 1911

General characteristics

- Crew: 1-3
- Capacity: 5-7
- Length: 38 ft 6 in (11.73 m)
- Wingspan: 49 ft 0 in (14.94 m)
- Height: 16 ft 2 in (4.93 m)
- Wing area: 375 sq ft (34.8 m^{2})
- Airfoil: root: NACA 23015; tip: NACA 23009
- Empty weight: 5,425 lb (2,461 kg)
- Gross weight: 8,000 lb (3,629 kg)
- Powerplant: 2 × Pratt & Whitney R-985-AN-6 Wasp Junior 9-cylinder air-cooled radial piston engines, 450 hp (340 kW) each

Performance

- Maximum speed: 201 mph (323 km/h, 175 kn) at 5,000 ft (1,500 m)
- Cruise speed: 191 mph (307 km/h, 166 kn) at 5,000 ft (1,500 m)
- Range: 640 mi (1,030 km, 560 nmi)
- Service ceiling: 21,300 ft (6,500 m)
- Rate of climb: 1,100 ft/min (5.6 m/s)
- Wing loading: 21.3 lb/sq ft (104 kg/m^{2})
- Power/mass: 0.11 hp/lb (0.18 kW/kg)

Armament

- Bombs: 2 × 325 lb (147 kg) depth charges or 2 × 250 lb (110 kg) GP bombs

== See also ==
Related development

- Grumman G-73 Mallard
- Grumman G-44 Widgeon
- Kaman K-16B

Related lists

- List of aircraft of World War II
- List of flying boats and floatplanes

== Bibliography ==
- Ablitzer, Fabrice. "Round-Out". Air Enthusiast, No. 79, January/February 1999. p. 79. ISSN 0143-5450.
- Donald, David, ed. American Warplanes of World War II. London: Aerospace Publishing, 1995. ISBN 1874023727.
- Francillon, René J. and Gary L. Killion. "Sauce for the Goose – turbine style". Air International, July 1993, Vol. 45, No 1, pp. 53–57. Stamford, UK:Key Publishing. ISSN 0306-5634.
- Francillon, René J (March 2008). "Grumman G-21 "Goose": L'oie qui ne se pose jamais". Le Fana de l'Aviation (in French). No. 460. pp. 32–40.
- Green, William. War Planes of the Second World War: Volume Five Flying Boats. London:Macdonald, 1968. ISBN 0-356-01449-5.
- Hagedorn, Daniel P. (1993). Central American and Caribbean Air Forces. Tonbridge, Kent, UK: Air-Britain (Historians) Ltd. ISBN 0851302106.
- Ledet, Michel (April 2002). "Des avions alliés aux couleurs japonais" [Allied Aircraft in Japanese Colors]. Avions: Toute l'Aéronautique et son histoire (in French) (109): 17–21. ISSN 1243-8650.
- March, Daniel J., ed. British Warplanes of World War II. London: Aerospace Publishing, 1998. ISBN 1874023921.
- Niccoli, Riccardo. "Pottuguese Numerology: Serial systems used by the Aeronautica Militar and the Força Aerea Portuguesa". Air Enthusiast, May–June 1998, No. 75. pp. 33–40. ISSN 0143-5450.
- Núñez Padin, Jorge Felix (2009). Núñez Padin, Jorge Felix (ed.). JRF Goose, PBY Catalina, PBM Mariner & HU-16 Albatros. Serie Aeronaval (in Spanish). Vol. 25. Bahía Blanca, Argentina: Fuerzas Aeronavales. ISBN 978-9872055745.
- Swanborough, Gordon and Peter M. Bowers. United States Navy Aircraft since 1911. London: Putnam, Second edition, 1976. ISBN 0370100549.
- Thruelsen, Richard. The Grumman Story. New York: Praeger Publishers, Inc., 1976. ISBN 0-275-54260-2.
- Winchester, Jim, ed. "Grumman Goose/Mallard." Biplanes, Triplanes and Seaplanes (The Aviation Factfile). Rochester, Kent, UK: Grange Books plc, 2004. ISBN 1840136413.
