= Kaman K-16B =

Type of aircraft

K-16B
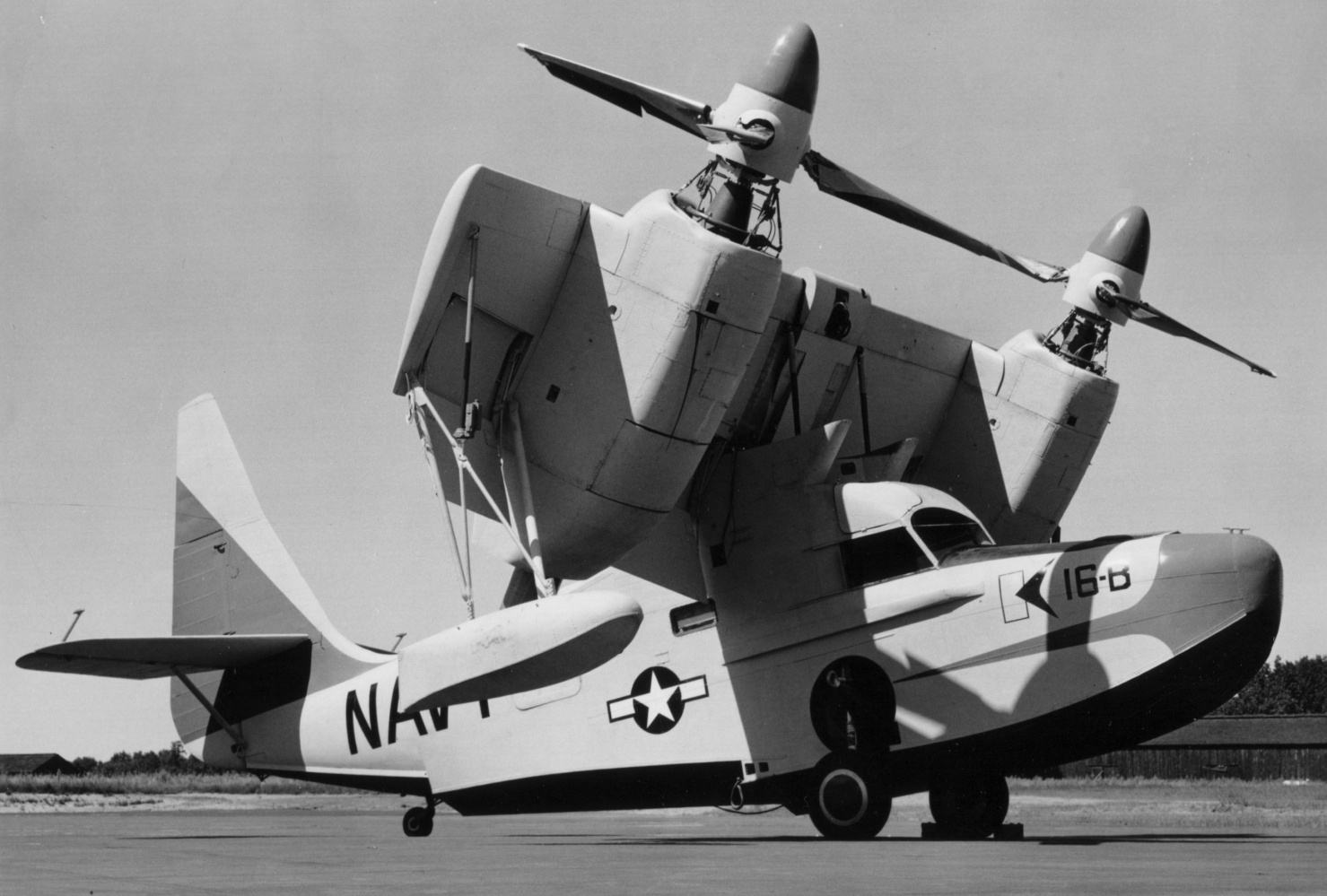
- The K-16B with wing at full tilt

General information
- Type: Experimental tiltwing
- National origin: United States
- Manufacturer: Kaman Aircraft
- Primary user: United States Navy
- Number built: 1

History
- Developed from: Grumman G-21 Goose

The Kaman K-16B is an experimental vertical-takeoff-and-landing aircraft that was constructed by Kaman Aircraft for the United States Navy in 1959 to evaluate the tiltwing concept. Converted from a Grumman Goose amphibian, the K-16B underwent extensive wind tunnel and tethered testing, but was not flown before the project was terminated in 1962.

== Design and development ==
During the late 1950s, there was extensive interest in the vertical takeoff and landing concept for aircraft, with multiple experimental types ordered to develop the technology for potential service. The United States Navy contracted with Kaman Aircraft of Bloomfield, Connecticut, to build a testbed based on the company's 'rotorprop' concept for tiltwing aircraft, using a Grumman JRF-5 Goose amphibian and other existing parts to reduce the cost and time necessary. The fuselage and tail of the Goose were mated to a new tilting wing and engine configuration; the maximum angle of incidence allowed was only 50 degrees; the rotorprop was expected to provide sufficient thrust to allow VTOL operations despite the low angle.

== Operational history ==
Delivered in late 1959, the K-16B underwent extensive wind tunnel testing, along with some tethered hops, to evaluate the tiltwing configuration's aerodynamic characteristics. Flight testing was originally anticipated to begin in the fall of 1960, however these preliminary tests continued into 1962. That year the project was cancelled with the aircraft having not conducted its first free flight.

== Surviving aircraft ==
The prototype K-16B is on display at the New England Air Museum in Windsor Locks, Connecticut.

== Specifications ==
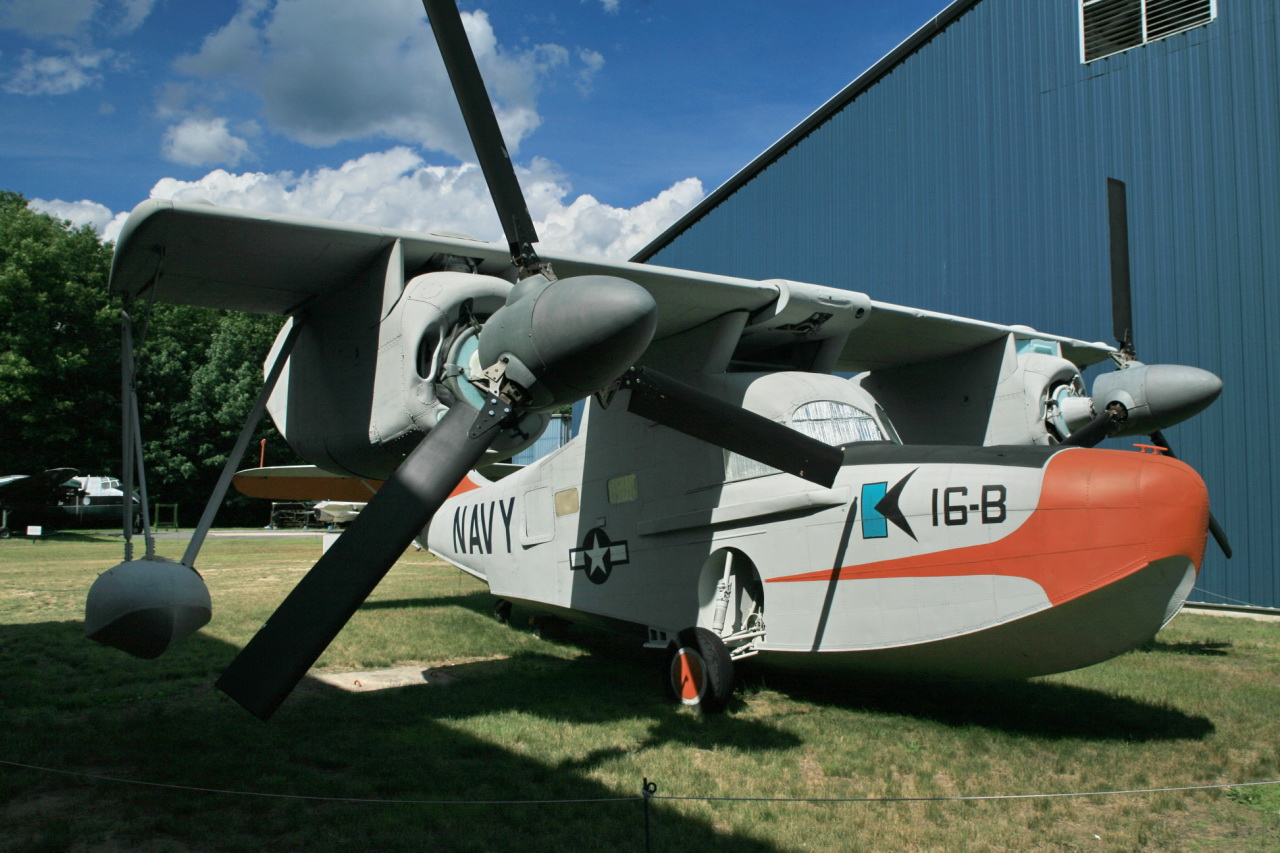
The K-16B at the New England Air Museum

Data from Jane's 1959–1960 and the New England Air Museum. All performance data estimated.

General characteristics

- Crew: 2
- Length: 38 ft 4 in (11.68 m)
- Wingspan: 34 ft 0 in (10.36 m)
- Height: 19 ft 2 in (5.84 m)
- Empty weight: 6,500 lb (2,948 kg)
- Gross weight: 8,000 lb (3,629 kg)
- Powerplant: 2 × General Electric YT58-GE-2A turboshafts, 1,325 hp (988 kW) each
- Propellers: 3-bladed Kaman, 14 ft 10 in (4.5 m) diameter

Performance

- Maximum speed: 200 mph (320 km/h, 170 kn)
- Range: 250 mi (400 km, 220 nmi)
- Service ceiling: 16,000 ft (4,900 m)

== See also ==
Related development

- Grumman G-21 Goose

Aircraft of comparable role, configuration, and era

- Canadair CL-84 Dynavert
- Hiller X-18
- LTV XC-142
- Vertol VZ-2

Related lists

- List of military aircraft of the United States
- List of VTOL aircraft
