= Vertol VZ-2 =

Experimental helicopter by Vertol, later Boeing

VZ-2
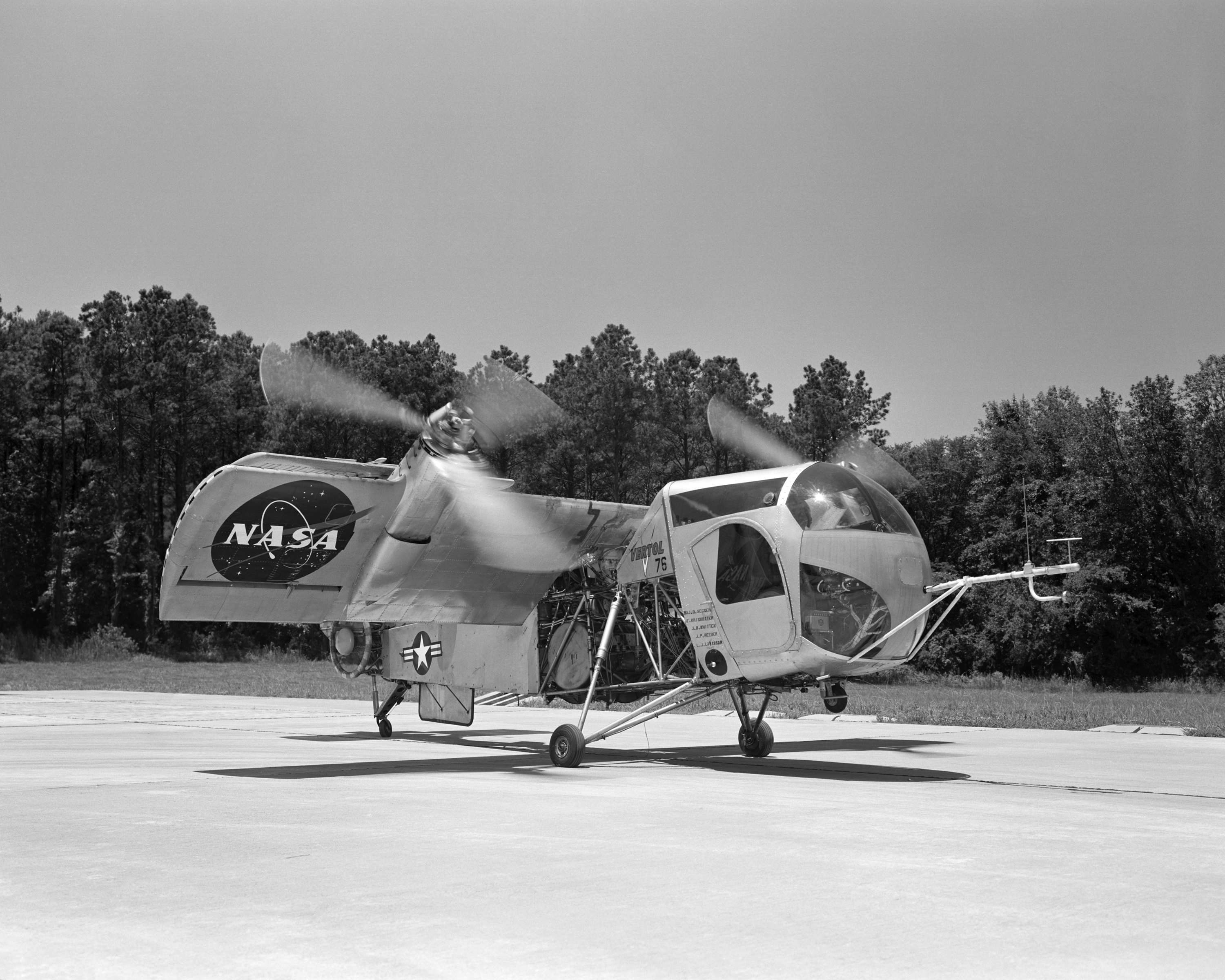

General information
- Type: Tiltwing research aircraft
- Manufacturer: Vertol (later Boeing Vertol)
- Status: Preserved
- Primary user: NASA
- Number built: 1

History
- First flight: 13 August 1957
- Retired: 1965

The Vertol VZ-2 (or Model 76) is a research aircraft built in the United States in 1957 to investigate the tiltwing approach to vertical take-off and landing.

== Design and development ==
The aircraft had a fuselage of tubular framework (originally uncovered) and accommodation for its pilot in a helicopter-like bubble canopy. The T-tail incorporated small ducted fans to act as thrusters for greater control at low speeds.

Ground tests began in April 1957 and on 13 August, the VZ-2 took off for the first time in hover mode only. On 23 July 1958, the aircraft made its first full transition from vertical flight to horizontal flight. By the time the test program ended in 1965, the VZ-2 had made some 450 flights, including 34 full transitions. The aircraft has been preserved by the National Air and Space Museum in storage at the Paul E. Garber Preservation, Restoration, and Storage Facility.

== Specifications ==
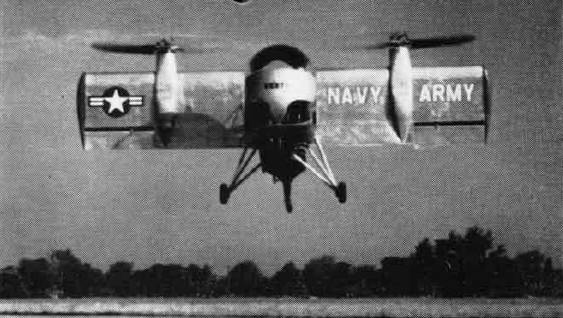
The VZ-2 in flight in 1958.

General characteristics

- Crew: one pilot
- Capacity: 1 passenger/observer
- Length: 26 ft 5 in (8.05 m)
- Wingspan: 24 ft 11 in (7.59 m)
- Diameter: 9 ft 6 in (2.90 m)
- Height: 15 ft 0 in (4.57 m)
- Empty weight: 3,700 lb (1,678 kg)
- Powerplant: 1 × Avco Lycoming YT53-L-1 turboshaft , 700 hp (522 kW)

Performance

- Maximum speed: 210 mph (340 km/h, 180 kn)
- Range: 130 mi (210 km, 110 nmi)
- Service ceiling: 13,800 ft (4,200 m)

== See also ==
Aircraft of comparable role, configuration, and era

- Canadair CL-84 Dynavert
- Dornier Do 29
- Hiller X-18
- Kaman K-16B
- LTV XC-142
