= Lycoming T53 =

Turboshaft helicopter engine

T53
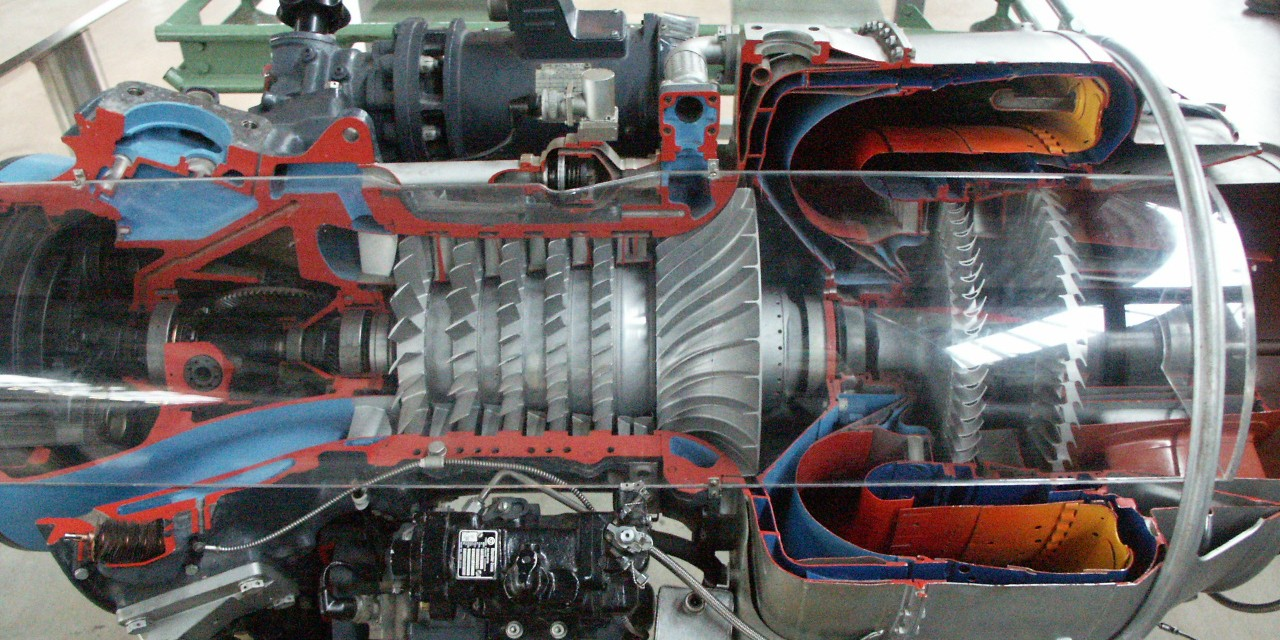
- Cutaway view of an early T53 turboprop, with single stage HP and power turbines
- Type: Turboshaft
- National origin: United States
- Manufacturer: Lycoming Engines; Honeywell Aerospace; Ozark Aeroworks LLC
- First run: ~1955
- Major applications: AH-1 Cobra; Kaman K-MAX; OV-1 Mohawk; UH-1 Iroquois
- Developed into: Lycoming T55

The Lycoming T53, (company designation LTC-1) is a turboshaft engine used on helicopters and (as a turboprop) fixed-wing aircraft since the 1950s. It was designed at the Lycoming Turbine Engine Division in Stratford, Connecticut, by a team headed by Anselm Franz, who was the chief designer of the Junkers Jumo 004 during World War II.

A much larger engine, similar in overall design, became the Lycoming T55 produced by Honeywell Aerospace. The T53 model is produced by Ozark Aeroworks LLC.

== Variants ==
=== Military designations ===
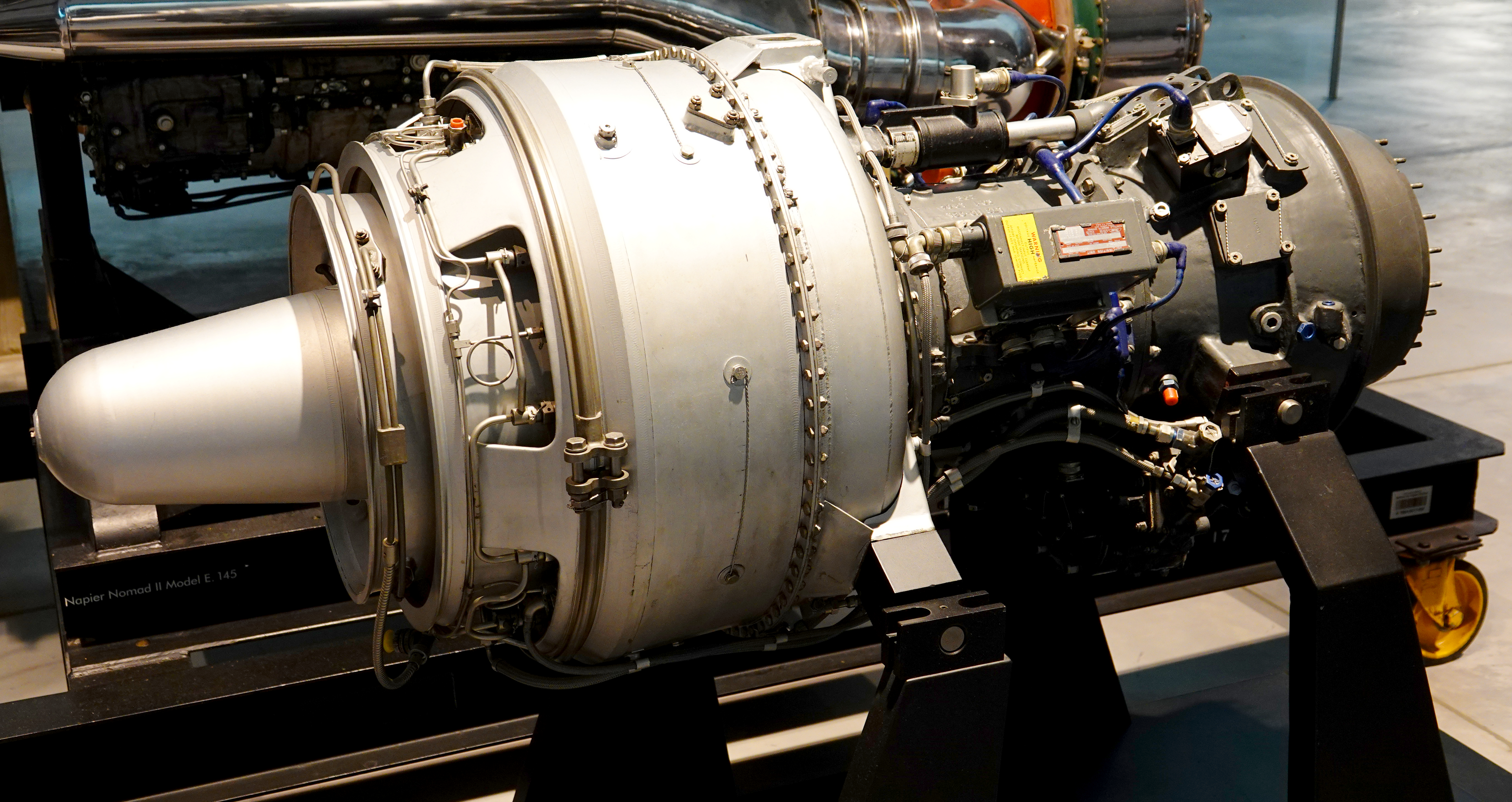
Lycoming T53-L-1 turboshaft engine at Steven F. Udvar-Hazy Center in Virginia, USA

T53-L-1
T53-L-1A
770 hp (570 kW)
T53-L-1B
860 hp (640 kW)
T53-L-3
T53-L-5
960 hp (720 kW)
T53-L-7
T53-L-11
1,100 hp (820 kW)
T53-L-13
T53-L-13B
1,400 hp (1,000 kW) improved L-11
T53-L-701
1,400 hp (1,000 kW) turboprop variant used on Mohawk and AIDC T-CH-1
T53-L-703
1,800 hp (1,300 kW) improved durability variant of the L-13B
TF12
1,150 hp (860 kW) marine gas turbine fitted to prototype hydrofoil Halobates.

=== Civil designations ===
T5307A
commercial L-7
T5309A
commercial L-9A
T5309B
commercial L-9B
T5309C
similar to T5309A but with L-11 combustion chamber
T5311A
1100 shp (820 kW)
T5313A
1400 shp (1044 kW) commercial variant of the L-13
T5313B
1400 shp (1044 kW) commercial variant of the L-13
T5317A
1500 shp (1119 kW) improved variant of the L-13
T5317A-1
T5317B
T5317BCV
LTC1B-1
LTC1B-2
company designation for L-1A
LTC1F-1
company designation for L-3
LTC1F-2
company designation for L-7
LTC1K-1
company designation for L-5
LTC1K-2
company designation for L-9
LTC1K-2A
company designation for L-9A
LTC1K-2B
company designation for L-9B
LTC1K-4
company designation for L-13
LTC1K-4A
for tilt-wing / tilt-rotor aircraft (Canadair CL-84 Dynavert)
LTC1K-4K
1550 shp (1156 kW) direct drive variant of the L-13B
LTC1K-5
company designation for L-11
Kawasaki KT5311A
Kawasaki production for Fuji-Bell 204B helicopters

== Applications ==
=== Aircraft ===
- AIDC T-CH-1 (T53-L-701)
- AIDC XC-2
- Bell 204B (T5311A)
- Bell 205A (T5313B)
- Bell 205A-1 (T5313B and T5317A)
- Bell AH-1 Cobra (T53-L-703)
- Bell UH-1H Iroquois (T53-L-703)
- Bell XV-15 (LTC1K-4K)
- Canadair CL-84 Dynavert
- Doak VZ-4
- Eagle Single (T5317A, T5317B, or T5317BCV)
- F+W C-3605
- Grumman OV-1D Mohawk (T53-L-701)
- Kaman HH-43 Huskie
- Kaman K-MAX (T5317A-1)
- Ryan VZ-3 Vertiplane
- Vertol VZ-2 (YT53)

=== Railway ===
- DB Class 210, diesel railway locomotive

== Specifications (T53-L-701) ==
Data from Flight International

==== General characteristics ====
- Type: Turboshaft
- Length: 58.4 in (1,483 mm)
- Diameter: 23 in (584 mm)
- Dry weight: 688 lb (312 kg)

==== Components ====
- Compressor: 5-stage axial and 1-stage centrifugal
- Combustors: reverse flow
- Turbine: 2-stage high pressure turbine; 2-stage power turbine

==== Performance ====
- Maximum power output: 1,451 shp (1,082 kW)
- Overall pressure ratio: 7.4
- Air mass flow: 10.7 lb/s (4.853 kg/s)
- Power-to-weight ratio: 2.109 hp/lb

== See also ==
Related development

- Lycoming T55

Related lists

- List of aircraft engines
