= Tiltwing =

Aircraft with a rotating wing for takeoff and landing

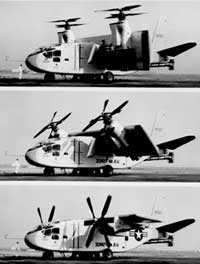
Hiller X-18 tilting its wing

A tiltwing aircraft features a wing that is horizontal for conventional forward flight and rotates up for vertical takeoff and landing. It is similar to the tiltrotor design where only the propeller and engine rotate. Tiltwing aircraft are typically fully capable of VTOL operations.

VTOL disc loading lift efficiency

The tiltwing design offers certain advantages in vertical flight relative to a tiltrotor. Because the slipstream from the rotor strikes the wing on its smallest dimension, the tiltwing is able to apply more of its engine power to lifting the aircraft. For comparison, the V-22 Osprey tiltrotor loses about 10% of its thrust to interference from the wings.

Another advantage of tiltwing aircraft is the ease of transition between VTOL and horizontal flight modes. A tiltrotor must first fly forwards like a helicopter, building airspeed until wing lift is sufficient to allow the nacelles to begin tilting down. As a note, the MV-22 Osprey's stall speed in airplane mode is 110 knots (204 km/h; 127 mph). Conversely, a tiltwing aircraft can begin the transition from helicopter to airplane at zero forward airspeed. Because of this, the Canadair CL-84 Dynavert was able to take off vertically, then accelerate from zero airspeed to 100 knots (185 km/h; 115 mph) in 8 seconds.

However, the fixed wing of a tiltrotor aircraft offers a superior angle of attack—thus more lift and a shorter takeoff roll—when performing STOL/STOVL operations.

The main drawbacks of tiltwing aircraft are susceptibility to wind gusts in VTOL mode and lower hover efficiency. The wing tilted vertically represents a large surface area for crosswinds to push against. Tiltrotors generally have better hover efficiency than tiltwings, but less than helicopters. This is due to the difference in rotor disk loading.

As of 2014, NASA is testing a diesel-electric hybrid 10-foot 10-rotor tiltwing called the GL-10 Greased Lightning, with most propellers folding during horizontal flight.

== List of tiltwing aircraft ==
Tiltwing designs with rocket, jet, or propeller propulsion

- Avión Torpedo (1902)
- Weserflug P.1003 (1938)
- Vertol VZ-2 (1957)
- Hiller X-18 (1959)
- Kaman K-16B (1959)
- LTV XC-142 (1964)
- Canadair CL-84 Dynavert (1965)
- NASA GL-10 Greased Lightning (2014)
- Airbus A³ Vahana (2018)
- Pterodynamics Transwing

== See also ==
- Thrust vectoring
- Tailsitter
- Tiltrotor
- Tiltjet
- Coleopter
- PTOL
- VTOL
- Variable-incidence wing

	Aerostat	Aerodyne		
	Lift: Lighter than air gas	Lift: Fixed wing	Lift: Unpowered rotor	Lift: Powered rotor
Unpowered free flight	(Free) balloon	Glider	Helicopter, etc. in autorotation	(None – see note 2)
Tethered (static or towed)	Tethered balloon	Kite	Rotor kite	(None – see note 2)
Powered	Airship	Airplane, ornithopter, etc.	Autogyro	Gyrodyne, helicopter
