= Alaska Island Air =

Alaska Island Air was an airline based out of Kotzebue. The airline would operate regional services in Alaska for 20 years.

AIA was headquartered in Petersburg, Alaska initially under the name Lon’s Flying Service. The airline was founded by Lon Marifer.
