= LTV XC-142 =

Experimental military tilt-wing aircraft

XC-142
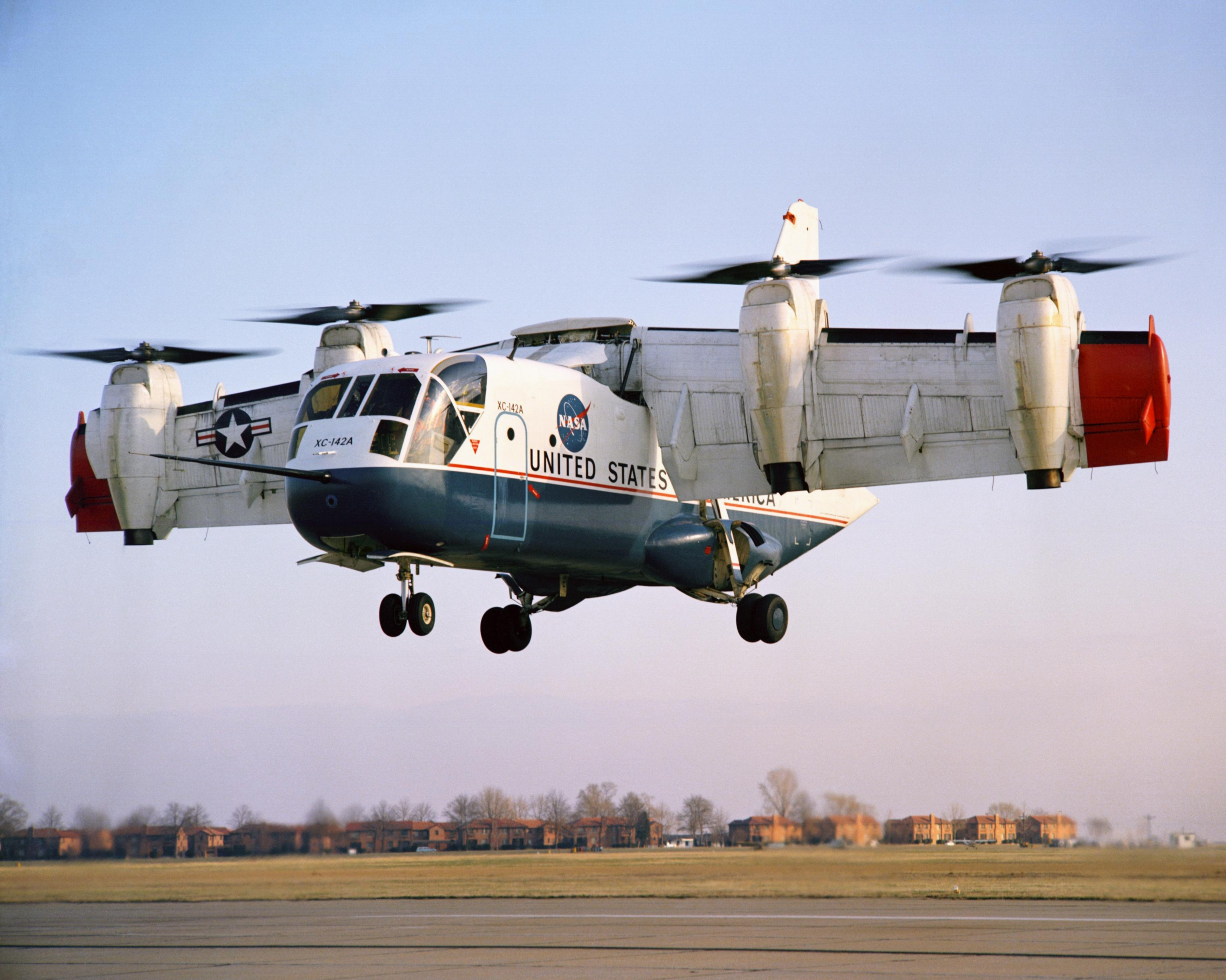

General information
- Type: Experimental V/STOL transport
- National origin: United States
- Manufacturer: Ling-Temco-Vought (LTV)
- Primary user: NASA
- Number built: 5

History
- First flight: 29 September 1964

The Ling-Temco-Vought (LTV) XC-142 is a tiltwing experimental aircraft designed to investigate the operational suitability of vertical/short takeoff and landing (V/STOL) transports. An XC-142A first flew conventionally on 29 September 1964, and completed its first transitional flight on 11 January 1965 by taking off vertically, changing to forward flight, and finally landing vertically. Its service sponsors pulled out of the program one by one, and it eventually ended due to a lack of interest after demonstrating its capabilities successfully.

== Development ==
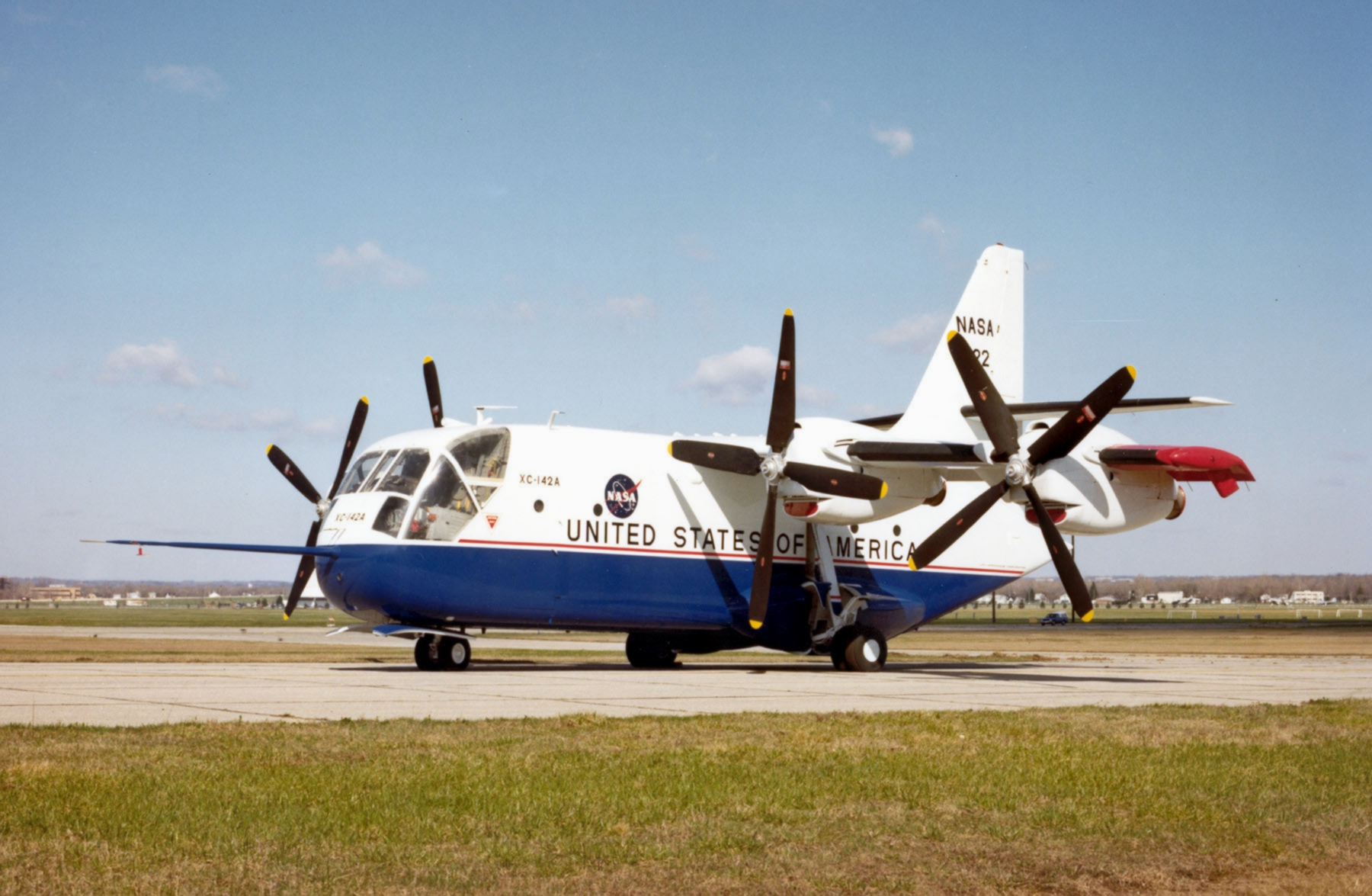
XC-142A at the National Museum of the U.S. Air Force

In 1959 the United States Army, Navy and Air Force began work on the development of a prototype V/STOL aircraft that could augment helicopters in transport-type missions. Specifically they were interested in designs with longer range and higher speeds than existing helicopters, in order to support operations over longer distances, or in the case of the United States Marine Corps, from further offshore. On 27 January 1961, a series of DOD actions resulted in an agreement where all of the military services would work on the Tri-Service Assault Transport Program under the Navy's Bureau of Naval Weapons (BuWeps) leadership.

The original outline had been drawn up as a replacement for the Sikorsky HR2S, with a payload on the order of 10,000 lb (4,500 kg). BuWeps released a revised specification that specified the same payload, but extended the operational radius to 250 miles (400 km) and increased the cruising airspeed to 250–300 knots (460–560 km/h) and the maximum airspeed to 300–400 knots (560–740 km/h). However, for the Marine Corps mission, the requirement stated that the fuel load could be reduced so that the maximum gross weight would not exceed 35,000 pounds (16,000 kg), as long as a 100-nautical-mile (190 km) radius was maintained.

Vought responded with a proposal combining engineering from their own design arm, as well as Ryan and Hiller, who had more extensive helicopter experience. Their proposal won the design contest, and a contract for five prototypes was signed in early 1962 with first flight specified for July 1964. The design was initially known as the Vought-Ryan-Hiller XC-142, but when Vought became part of the Ling-Temco-Vought (LTV) conglomerate this naming was dropped.

During the prototype development the Navy decided to exit the program. They were concerned that the strong propeller downwash would make it difficult to operate. Their existing HR2S fleet had a ground pressure of about 7.5 psi (500 hPa), and proved to blow people about on the ground and stir up considerable amounts of debris. The C-142 was predicted to have an even higher loading of 10 psi (700 hPa), which they believed would limit it to operations to and from prepared landing pads and was therefore unsuitable for assault operations.

The first prototype made its first conventional flight on 29 September 1964, first hover on 29 December 1964, and first transition on 11 January 1965. The first XC-142A was delivered to the Air Force test team in July 1965. During the XC-142A program, a total of 420 hours were flown in 488 flights. The five XC-142As were flown by 39 different military and civilian pilots. Tests included carrier operations, simulated rescues, paratroop drops, and low-level cargo extraction.

During testing the aircraft's cross-linked driveshaft proved problematic. The shaft resulted in excessive vibration and noise, resulting in a high pilot workload. Additionally, it proved susceptible to problems due to wing flexing. Shaft problems, along with operator errors, resulted in a number of hard landings causing damage. One crash occurred as a result of a failure of the driveshaft to the tail rotor, causing three fatalities. One of the limitations found in the aircraft was an instability between wing angles of 35 and 80 degrees, encountered at extremely low altitudes. There were also high side forces which resulted from yaw and weak propeller blade pitch angle controls. The new "2FF" propellers also proved to generate less thrust than predicted.

== Design ==
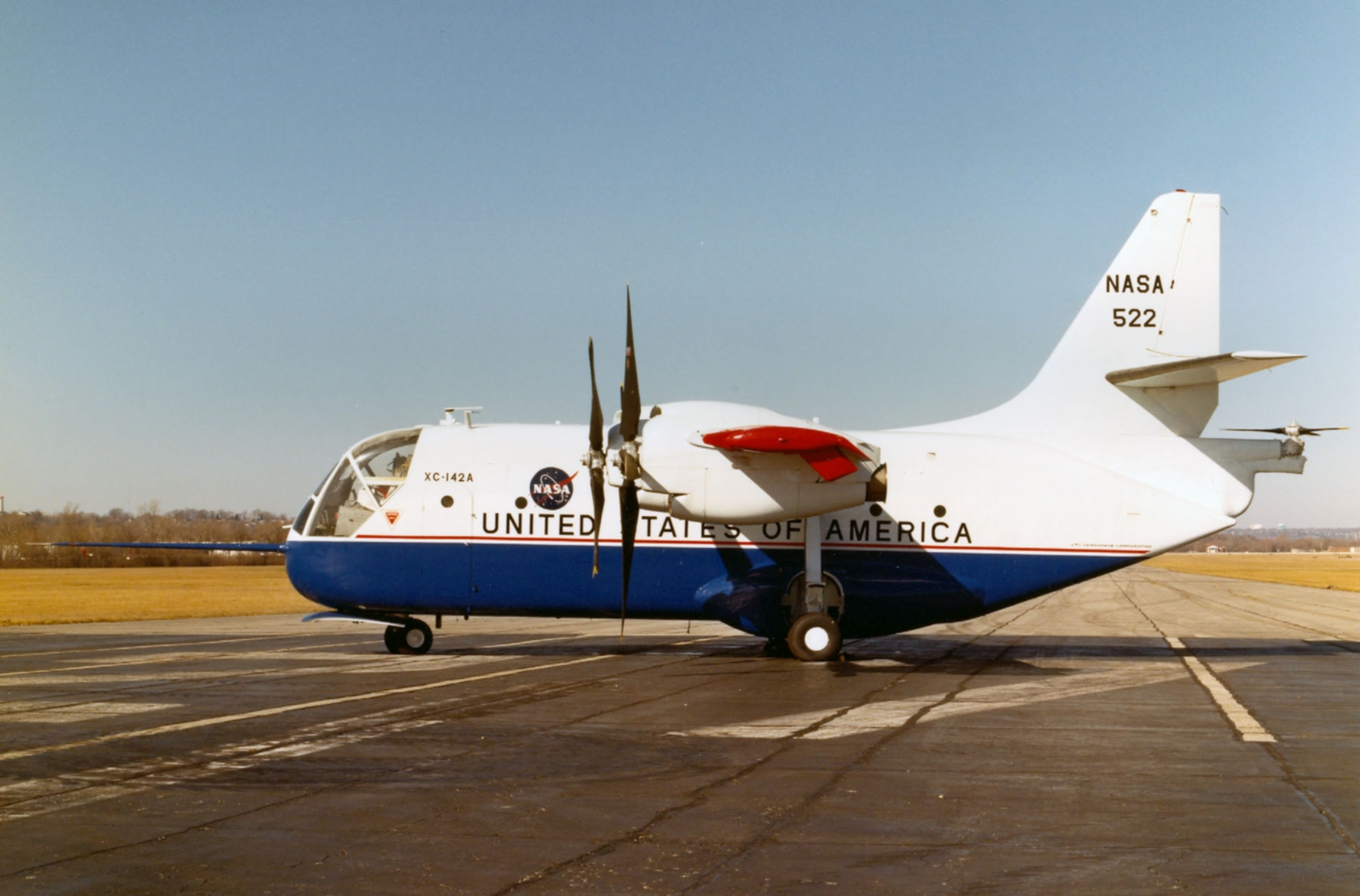
XC-142A at the National Museum of the U.S. Air Force, with the pitch rotor visible at the end of the tail

The basic design was fairly typical for a cargo aircraft, consisting of a large boxy fuselage with a tilted rear area featuring a loading ramp. It had a wingspan of 67 ft (20 m) and was 58 ft (18 m) long overall. The fuselage housed a 30 ft (9.1 m) long, 7.5 ft (2.3 m) wide 7 ft (2.1 m) high cargo area with a somewhat boxy cockpit on the front for the crew of two pilots and a loadmaster. The wing was high-mounted and the tail surfaces were cruciform to keep the rear area clear during loading. Tricycle landing gear were used, with the main legs retracting into blisters on the fuselage sides. In normal parked configuration it would appear to be a conventional cargo plane.

For V/STOL operations, the aircraft "converted" by tilting its wing to the vertical. Roll control during hover was provided by differential clutching of the propellers, while yaw used the ailerons, which were in the airflow. For pitch control the aircraft featured a separate tail rotor, oriented horizontally to lift the tail, as opposed to the more conventional anti-torque rotors on helicopters that are mounted vertically. When on the ground, the tail rotor folded against the tail to avoid being damaged during loading. The wing could be rotated to 100 degrees, past vertical, in order to hover in a tailwind.

The XC-142 was powered by four General Electric T64 turboshaft engines cross-linked on a common driveshaft, which eliminated engine-out asymmetric thrust problems during V/STOL operations, to drive four 15.5-foot (4.7 m) Hamilton Standard fiberglass propellers. Compared to conventional designs it was overpowered: it had 0.27 hp/lb, compared to 0.12 hp/lb for the contemporary Lockheed C-130D Hercules. This extra power was required for safe VTOL operations, and gave the aircraft excellent all-around performance which included a maximum speed of over 400 mph (640 km/h), making it one of the fastest VTOL transport aircraft of the era.

== Operational history ==
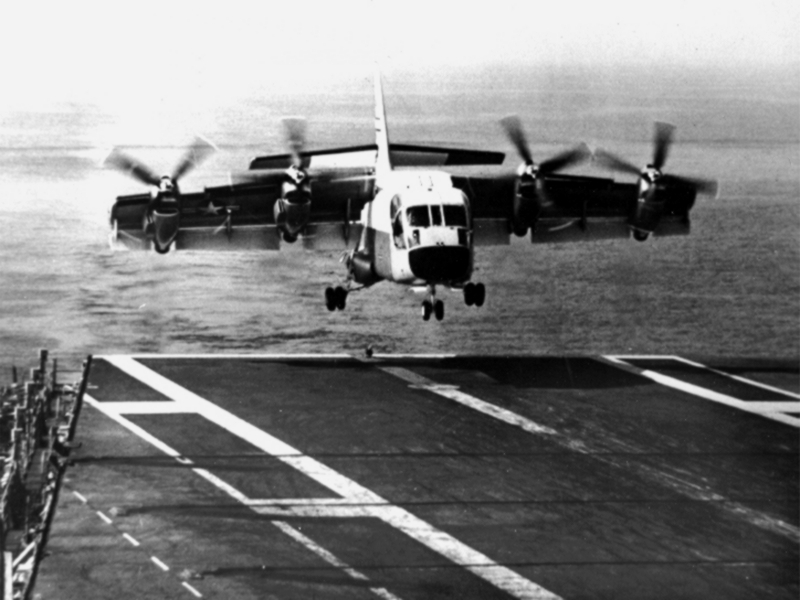
The XC-142 during trials aboard USS Bennington (CVS-20), in 1966

The aircraft never proceeded beyond the prototype stage. Five XC-142As were built during the 1960s.

The flight, made on the #2 aircraft, was 38 minutes in length, during which the aircraft's general handling characteristics were checked at an altitude of 10,000 feet at a speed of approximately 150 knots. The landing gear was left down throughout the entire flight; takeoff and landing were made with wing and flaps at 10 degrees. Throughout the flight, the aircraft demonstrated smooth response and stable aerodynamic characteristics. At the end of September 1964, the overall program was analyzed and considered to be "6 to 7 weeks behind schedule".

In 1966, while tests were still underway, the Air Force requested a proposal for a production version, the C-142B. Since the Navy had backed out by this time, the Navy carrier compatibility requirement could be eliminated. This dramatically reduced the empty weight. Other changes proposed for this version included a streamlined cockpit, larger fuselage, upgraded engines and simplified engine maintenance.

After reviewing the C-142B proposal, the tri-services management team could not develop a requirement for a V/STOL transport. XC-142A testing ended, and the remaining flying copy was turned over to NASA for research testing from May 1966 to May 1970.

In service it would carry 32 equipped troops or 8,000 pounds (4,000 kg) of cargo. It had maximum gross weight of 41,000 pounds (19,000 kg) for a vertical take-off and 45,000 pounds (20,000 kg) for a short takeoff. A civilian version, the Downtowner, was also proposed. This was designed to carry 40–50 passengers at a cruise speed of 290 mph (470 km/h) using only two of its engines.

== Surviving aircraft ==
Of the five aircraft built, only one still survives.

- XC-142A (AF Ser. No. 62-5924) is on display in the fourth building of the National Museum of the United States Air Force at Wright-Patterson Air Force Base near Dayton, Ohio. It was flown to the museum in 1970 and moved from the experimental aircraft hangar to the fourth building of the museum's main complex in November 2015.

== Specifications (XC-142A) ==
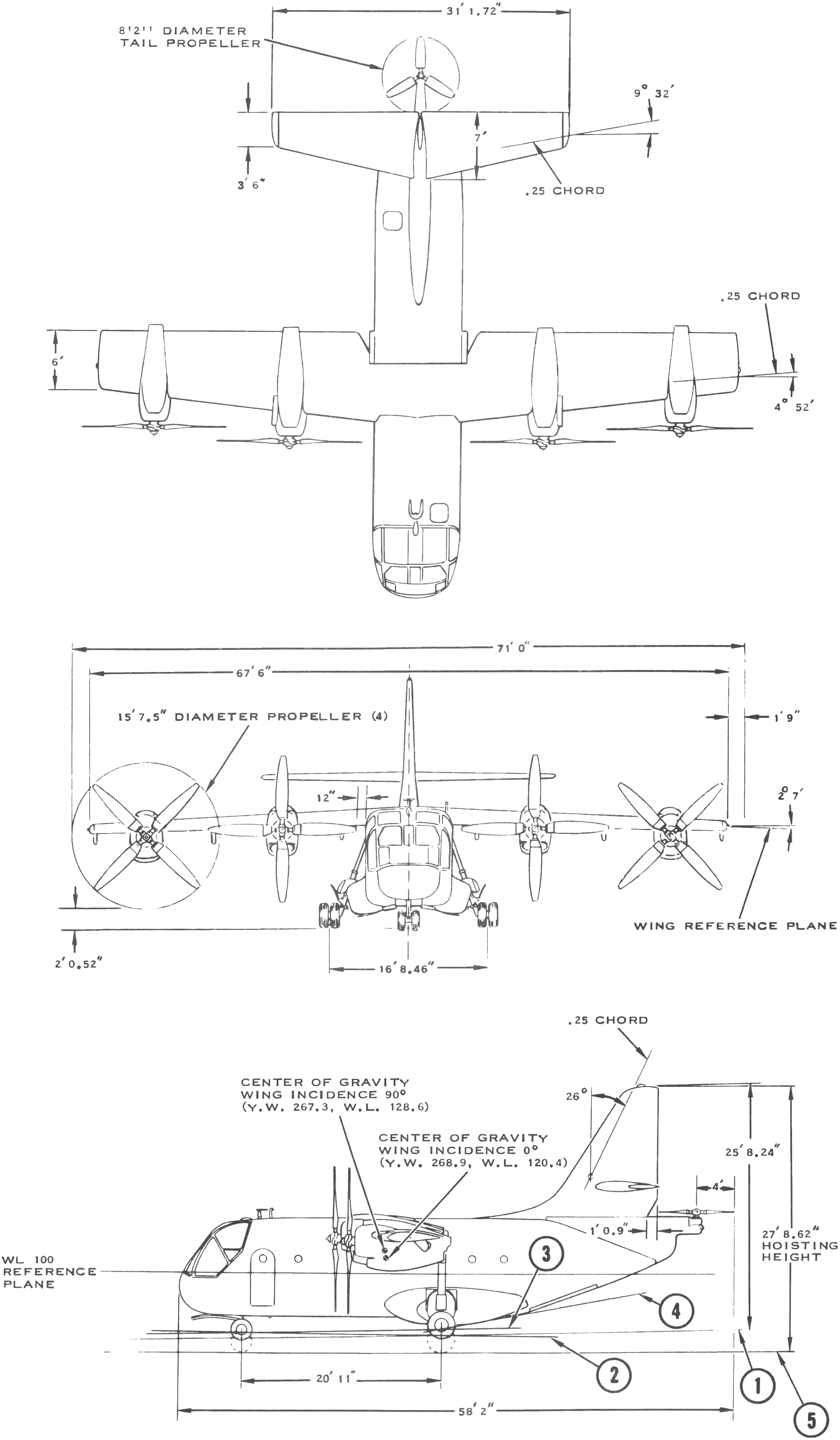
3-view line drawing of the LTV XC-142

Data from Jane's All The World's Aircraft 1965–66 and

General characteristics

- Crew: 2
- Capacity:
  - 32 fully-equipped troops or
  - 24 stretcher patients and 4 attendants or
  - 8,000 lb (3,600 kg) cargo
- Length: 58 ft 1 in (17.70 m)
- Wingspan: 67 ft 6 in (20.57 m)
- Height: 26 ft 1 in (7.95 m)
- Wing area: 534.5 sq ft (49.66 m^{2})
- Aspect ratio: 8.6:1
- Empty weight: 22,595 lb (10,249 kg)
- Gross weight: 34,474 lb (15,637 kg) (VTOL weight)
- Max takeoff weight: 44,500 lb (20,185 kg) (STOL)
- Fuel capacity: 1,400 US gal (1,200 imp gal; 5,300 L)
- Powerplant: 4 × General Electric T64-GE-1 turboprops, 3,080 hp (2,300 kW) each
- Propellers: 4-bladed Hamilton Standard variable-pitch propellers, 15.5 ft 0 in (4.72 m) diameter

Performance

- Maximum speed: 431 mph (694 km/h, 375 kn) at 20,000 ft (6,100 m)
- Cruise speed: 288 mph (463 km/h, 250 kn) at sea level
- Combat range: 230–470 mi (370–760 km, 200–410 nmi)
- Ferry range: 3,800 mi (6,100 km, 3,300 nmi)
- Service ceiling: 25,000 ft (7,600 m)
- Rate of climb: 6,800 ft/min (35 m/s)

== See also ==
- Bell Boeing V-22 Osprey
- Tiltrotor

Aircraft of comparable role, configuration, and era

- Canadair CL-84 Dynavert
- Hiller X-18
- Kaman K-16B
- Vertol VZ-2

Related lists

- List of military aircraft of the United States
- List of VTOL aircraft
