= Hiller X-18 =

Experimental cargo transport aircraft

X-18
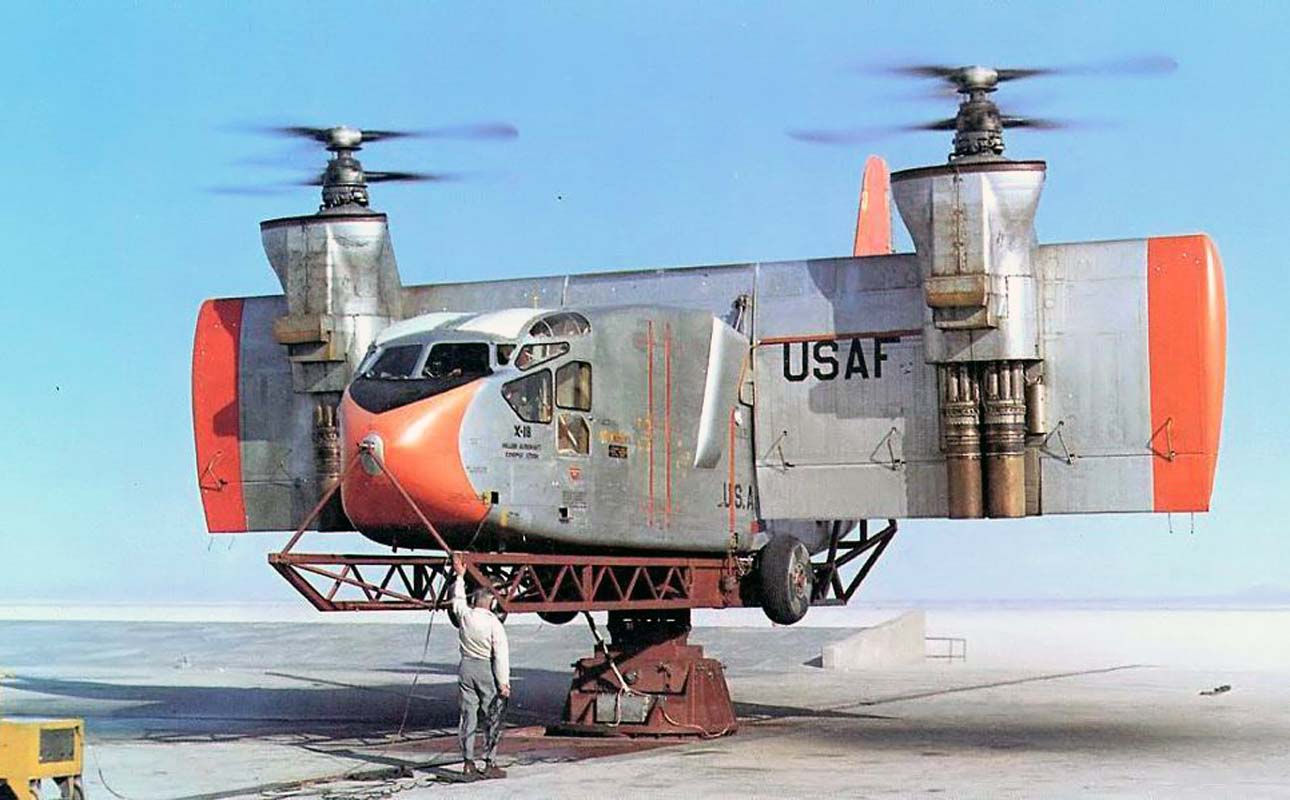
- Ground testing the X-18 tiltwing

General information
- Type: Experimental prototype
- Manufacturer: Hiller Aircraft
- Designer: Stanley Hiller Jr
- Number built: 1

History
- First flight: 24 November 1959
- Developed from: Chase YC-122 Avitruc

The Hiller X-18 was an experimental cargo transport aircraft designed to be the first testbed for tiltwing and V/STOL (vertical/short takeoff and landing) technology.

== Development ==
The X-18 showing its elaborate engine configuration

Design work started in 1955 by Stanley Hiller Jr and Hiller Aircraft Corporation received a manufacturing contract and funding from the United States Air Force to build the only X-18 built, serialized 57-3078.

To speed up construction and conserve money, the plane was constructed from scavenged parts including a Chase YC-122C Avitruc fuselage, 49-2883, and turboprops from the Lockheed XFV-1 and Convair XFY-1 Pogo experimental fighter programs. The tri-bladed contra-rotating propellers were a giant 16 ft (4.8 m) across. The Westinghouse turbojet engine had its exhaust diverted upwards and downwards at the tail to give the plane pitch control at low speeds. Hiller nicknamed their X-18 the Propelloplane for public relations purposes.

== Service history ==
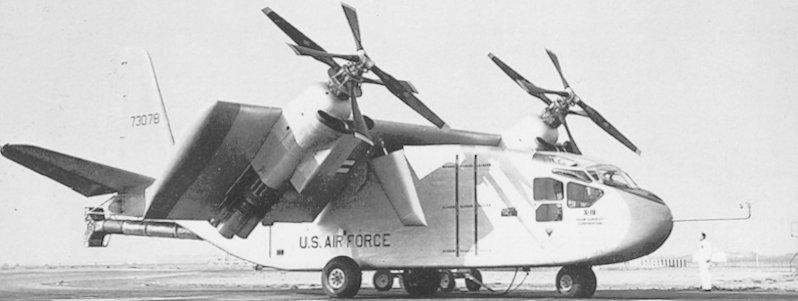
The X-18 with partially rotated tiltwings

Preliminary testing occurred at Moffett Field Naval Air Station, CA. The first flight (hop) was on 11/20/1959 followed by the first real flight on 11/24/1959 with Hiller test pilots George Bright and Bruce Jones. Further test flights were held at Edwards AFB, ultimately recording 20 flights. A number of problems plagued the X-18 including being susceptible to wind gusts when the wing rotated, acting like a sail. In addition the turboprop engines were not cross-linked, so the failure of one engine meant the airplane would crash. Thrust control was through throttle changes, which were too slow for acceptable height and roll control.

On the 20th and final flight in July 1961, the X-18 had a propeller pitch control problem when attempting to convert to a hover at 10,000 ft (3,000 m) and went into a spin. The crew regained control and landed, but the X-18 never flew again. However ground testing of the tiltwing concepts continued. Eventually a VTOL Test Stand was built on which the X-18's vertical takeoff and landing and hover control was to be tested. One engine run was successfully conducted to the full 15-foot (4.6 m) wheel height on the VTOL Test Stand. The program was canceled on January 18, 1964, before further VTOL Test Stand testing could be conducted, and the X-18 was cut up for scrap.

The program proved several things that contributed to further tilt-wing VSTOL technology programs:

1. cross-shafting between the engines was necessary in order to avoid loss of control in the event of an engine failure.
2. direct propeller pitch control was necessary for precise height and lateral control during VTOL and hover.

This knowledge was employed in the successful development and flight tests of the Tri-Service XC-142A tilt-wing VSTOL transport.

== Specifications (X-18) ==
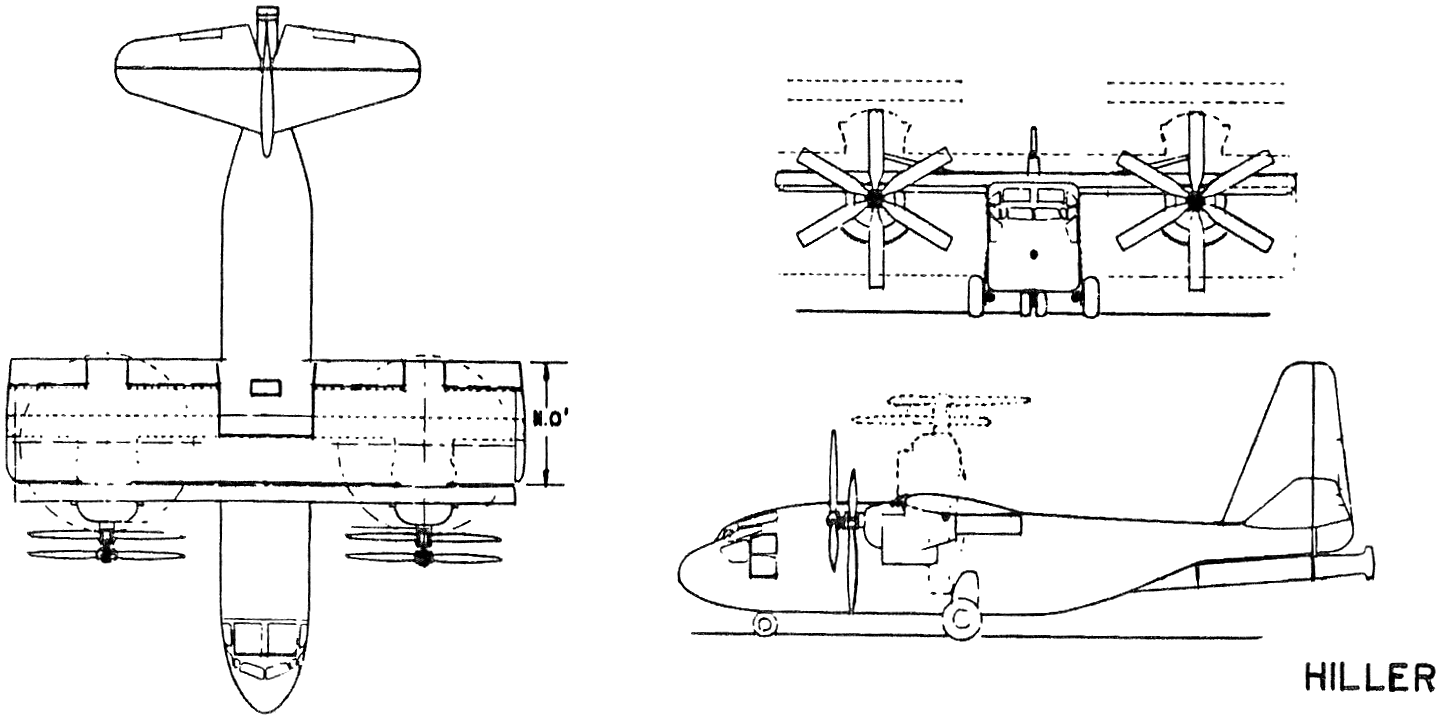
3-view line drawing of the Hiller X-18

Data from Jane's All the World's Aircraft 1961-62, The X-planes : X-1 to X-29

General characteristics

- Crew: 2-3
- Length: 63 ft (19 m)
- Wingspan: 48 ft (15 m)
- Height: 24 ft (7.3 m)
- Wing area: 528 sq ft (49.1 m^{2})
- Aspect ratio: 4.36
- Airfoil: NACA 23015
- Empty weight: 27,052 lb (12,271 kg)
- Max takeoff weight: 33,000 lb (14,969 kg)
- Fuel capacity: 1,000 US gal (833 imp gal; 3,785 L)
- Powerplant: 2 × Allison T40-A-14 coupled turboprop engines, 5,850 hp (4,360 kW) each equivalent
- Powerplant: 1 × Westinghouse J34 turbojet, 3,400 lbf (15 kN) thrust for jet reaction pitch control
- Propellers: 6-bladed Curtiss-Wright, 16 ft 1 in (4.90 m) diameter contra-rotating propellers

Performance

- Maximum speed: 253 mph (407 km/h, 220 kn)
- Maximum wing-tilt speed: 178 mph (155 kn; 286 km/h)
- Range: 224 mi (360 km, 195 nmi)
- Service ceiling: 35,300 ft (10,800 m)

== See also ==
- Tiltrotor – Aircraft type

Related development

- Chase YC-122 Avitruc – 1940s military transport aircraft

Aircraft of comparable role, configuration, and era

- Canadair CL-84 Dynavert – Canadian experimental tiltwing VSTOL aircraft
- Kaman K-16B – Type of aircraft
- LTV XC-142 – Experimental military tilt-wing aircraft
- Vertol VZ-2 – Experimental helicopter by Vertol, later Boeing

Related lists

- List of military aircraft of the United States
- List of VTOL aircraft – List of "VTOL" (Vertical Take-off and Landing) aircraft
