= Canadair CL-84 Dynavert =

Canadian experimental tiltwing VSTOL aircraft

CL-84 "Dynavert"
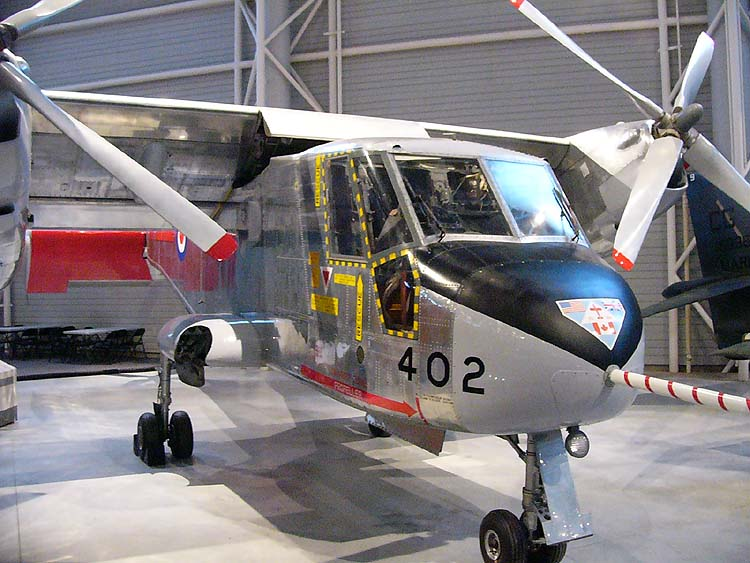
- CL-84-1 (CX8402) on display at the Canada Aviation Museum in Ottawa, Ontario

General information
- Type: Experimental VSTOL
- National origin: Canada
- Manufacturer: Canadair
- Status: Cancelled
- Number built: 4

History
- Manufactured: 1964–1972
- Introduction date: Test evaluation only
- First flight: 7 May 1965
- Retired: 1974

The Canadair CL-84 "Dynavert", designated by the Canadian Forces as the CX-131, is a V/STOL turbine tiltwing monoplane designed and manufactured by Canadair between 1964 and 1972. Only four of these experimental aircraft were built, with three entering flight testing. Two of the CL-84s crashed due to mechanical failures, with no fatalities in either accident. Despite the CL-84 being successful in the experimental and operational trials carried out between 1972 and 1974, none of the prospective customers placed any orders for the type.

== Development ==
Between 1957 and 1963, Canadair carried out research in VTOL (vertical takeoff and landing) technology with the assistance of the National Research Board (NRB) and the Defence Research Board (DRB) of Canada. The studies pointed the way to a unique tilt-wing design. The wing and the powerplants of the aircraft could be tilted hydro-mechanically (recirculating ball actuator) so that the wing incidence changed through 100 degrees from a normal flight angle to those for STOL and VTOL. The incidence of the tailplane (or stabilizer) was automatically altered to deal with trim changes as the wing-incidence varied. The two sets of tail rotor blades were locked in a fore and aft position in conventional flight.

The design team included Canadair's chief designer, Frederick Phillips, and Latvian aircraft designer Karlis Irbitis, among several others.

At the time of the CL-84 project, Canadair was a subsidiary of General Dynamics and the parent company christened the new aircraft, the "Dynavert". Canadair project personnel typically referred to it simply as the "84".

== Design ==
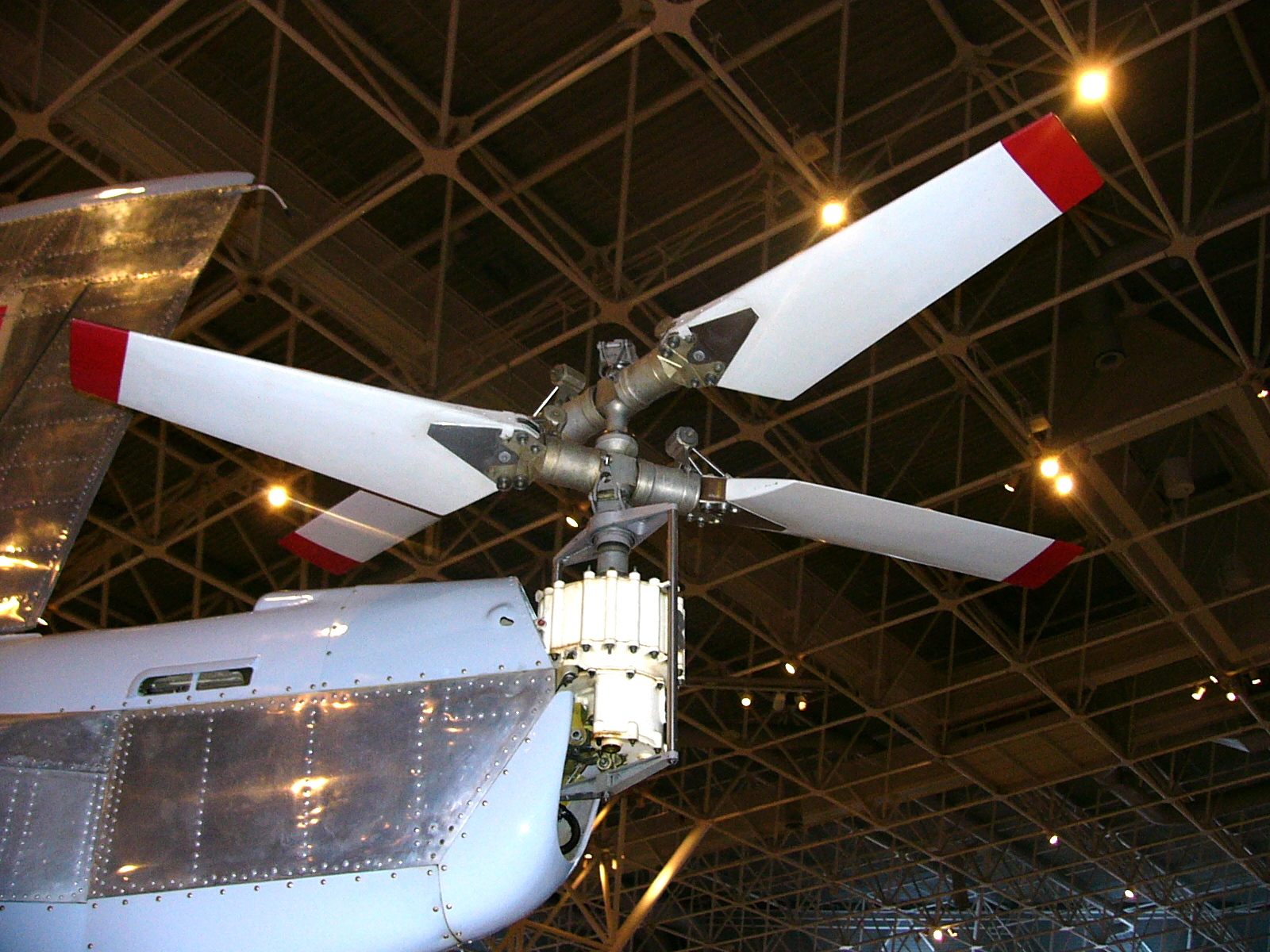
The CL-84 tail rotor on serial number CX8402 on display at the Canada Aviation and Space Museum

Contra-rotating rotors on a vertical axis in the tail provided fore-and-aft (pitch) control during hovering and transitional flight. The propulsion and lifting propellers were handed (i.e. revolved in opposite directions) and were interconnected by shafts through a central gearbox from which the tail rotors and accessories were also driven. The thrust from the propellers was matched automatically except when over-ridden by the pilot for lateral (roll) control in slow or hovering flight. A mechanical "mixing" unit was used to adjust the functions of the various controls in the different modes of flight. The flap/ailerons gave yaw control when hovering. In the cockpit fore and aft stick was always pitch, side to side was always roll and the rudder pedals were always yaw, irrespective of the wing position through its full range.

Two 1,500 shp (1,100 kW) Lycoming T53 shaft-turbines were used to drive the two 14 ft (4.3 m) four-bladed propellers. The engines were interconnected by cross shafts, so that in the event of the failure of one engine, it would automatically disconnect through torque spring clutches and both propellers would be driven by the remaining engine.

There were two main reasons for the technical success of the CL-84 design. Aerodynamic considerations were given a very high priority, and the controlling of power was kept as simple and direct as possible.

The propeller disks extended slightly beyond the wingtips, so the whole of the wing (except for the portion above the fuselage) was immersed in the propeller slipstream. This, together with full-span leading edge and trailing edge flaps which were programmed with wing tilt angle, ensured that the wing was never stalled. Trim changes were minimized by programmed tilting of the tailplane. All programming was based on extensive testing in the wind tunnel and on an outdoor mobile test rig.

The power of both engines was controlled by a single "power lever" in all flight regimes. To provide crisp thrust control during hover, movement of the power lever caused a direct adjustment of blade angle, analogous to the collective pitch control of a helicopter, with the propeller CPU governor making a follow-up adjustment of blade angle to maintain the selected rpm. The direct adjustment of blade angle was faded out automatically as the blade angle increased with increasing forward speed.

The only unfamiliar control function the pilot had to deal with was the wing-tilt control, which was a switch on the power lever (and took the place of controlling the flaps). The combination of smooth aerodynamics and simple power control made it easy for fixed-wing pilots to perform transitions between hover and wing-down modes on their first flight in the CL-84.

== Operational history ==
=== Testing ===
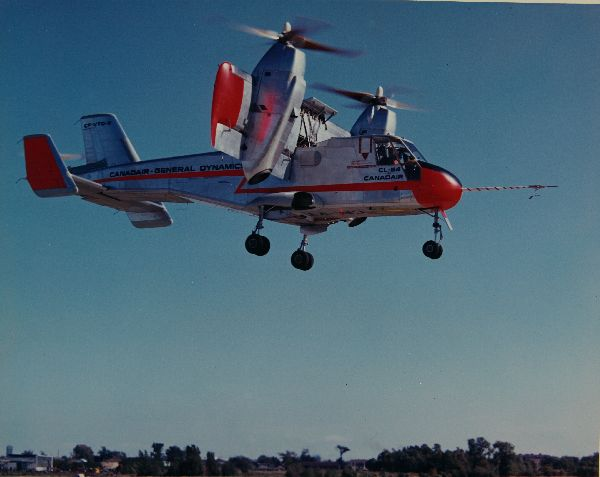
CL-84 CF-VTO-X during testing

CF-VTO-X, the CL-84 prototype first flew in hover on 7 May 1965, flown by Canadair Chief Pilot Bill Longhurst. On 12 September 1967, after 305 relatively uneventful flights, CF-VTO-X was at 3,000 ft (910 m) when a bearing in the propeller control system failed. Both pilot and observer successfully ejected but the prototype was lost. Canadair redesigned its replacement, the CL-84-1 incorporating over 150 engineering changes including the addition of dual controls, upgraded avionics, an airframe stretch (5 ft 3 in (1.60 m) longer) and more powerful engines (boosted by 100 hp (75 kW)).

The first newly designed CL-84-1 (CX8401) flew on 19 February 1970 with Bill Longhurst at the controls. He continued with the CL-84 program until his retirement from active flying in January 1971. Doug Atkins then assumed the role of chief test pilot. At about the same time, at the height of the Vietnam War, the US Navy expressed interest in the concept. Atkins was dispatched on a cross-country tour that took a CL-84-1 to Washington DC where he landed on the White House lawn, Norfolk, Virginia, Edwards Air Force Base and eventually full trials on USS Guam. The CL-84-1 performed flawlessly, demonstrating versatility in a wide range of onboard roles, including troop deployment, radar surveillance and anti-submarine warfare. It could perform wing transition from zero airspeed and accelerate to 100 knots (190 km/h) in 8 seconds.

The potency of the CL-84-1 as a gun platform was dramatically illustrated in a Canadair promotional film. Fitted with a General Electric SUU 11A/A pod with a 7.62 mm minigun, Adkins maintained a rock-steady position as he sprayed a ground target. The rotating six-barrel Gatling gun delivered 3,000 rounds per minute.

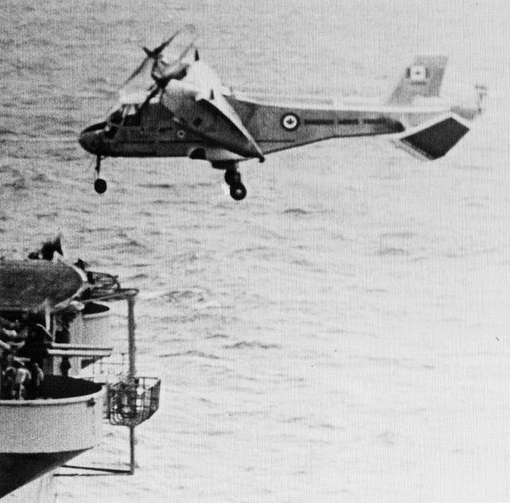
CL-84-1 landing on USS Guam in 1973.

Continuing Tripartite trials by Canadian, US (Navy/Marine) and RAF evaluation pilots at the US Navy's Patuxent River Experimental Test Center showed that the CL-84-1 was a suitable multi-mission aircraft. RAF Flight Lieutenant Ron Ledwidge became the first to make a descending transition from hovering to conventional flight and back to hovering while on instruments.

On 8 August 1973, the first CL-84-1 was lost when a catastrophic failure occurred in the left propeller gearbox in a maximum power climb. The US Navy and US Marine pilots aboard ejected safely. Canadair representatives investigated and recorded that the entire propeller and supporting structure of the gearbox had broken away during the climb. The second CL-84-1 (CX8402) was rushed stateside to complete the Phase 2 trials on board USS Guadalcanal. In the face of gale storm conditions, the "84" performed tasks such as ferrying troops and "blind-flight". Phase 3 and 4 trials proceeded immediately after, but, despite positive reviews from over 40 pilots, the CL-84-1 did not win any production contracts.

=== Cancellation ===
The end of the Vietnam War meant a scaling back on military requirements, but Canadair designer Fred Phillips had been cognizant of other factors gravitating against the "84". The first and most crucial was the "NBH" (not built here) factor; Canada had overcome it with other sales to the US military but the de Havilland Canada Beaver, Otter and Caribou loomed as exceptions to the rule.

Canadair had tried unsuccessfully to sell the aircraft to other countries including Germany, Holland, Italy, Scandinavia and the United Kingdom with no orders being placed.

A prototype and three evaluation aircraft had been built. The three CL-84s that flew made a total of over 700 flights and were flown (besides Canadair test pilots) by 36 pilots from Canadian, UK and US civil and military agencies.

== Aircraft on display ==
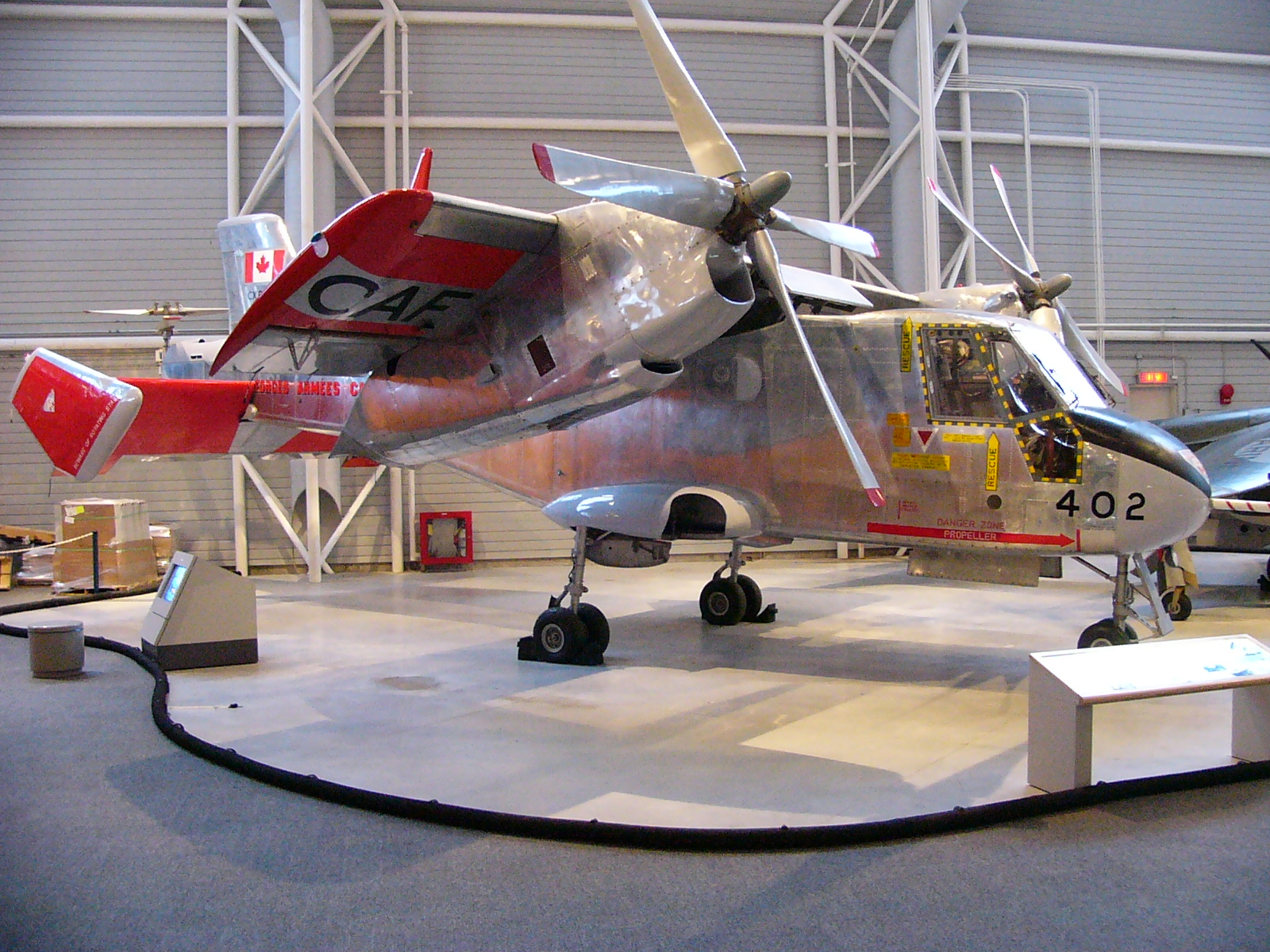
Canadair CL-84 Dynavert serial number CX8402 on display at the Canada Aviation Museum in Ottawa, Ontario

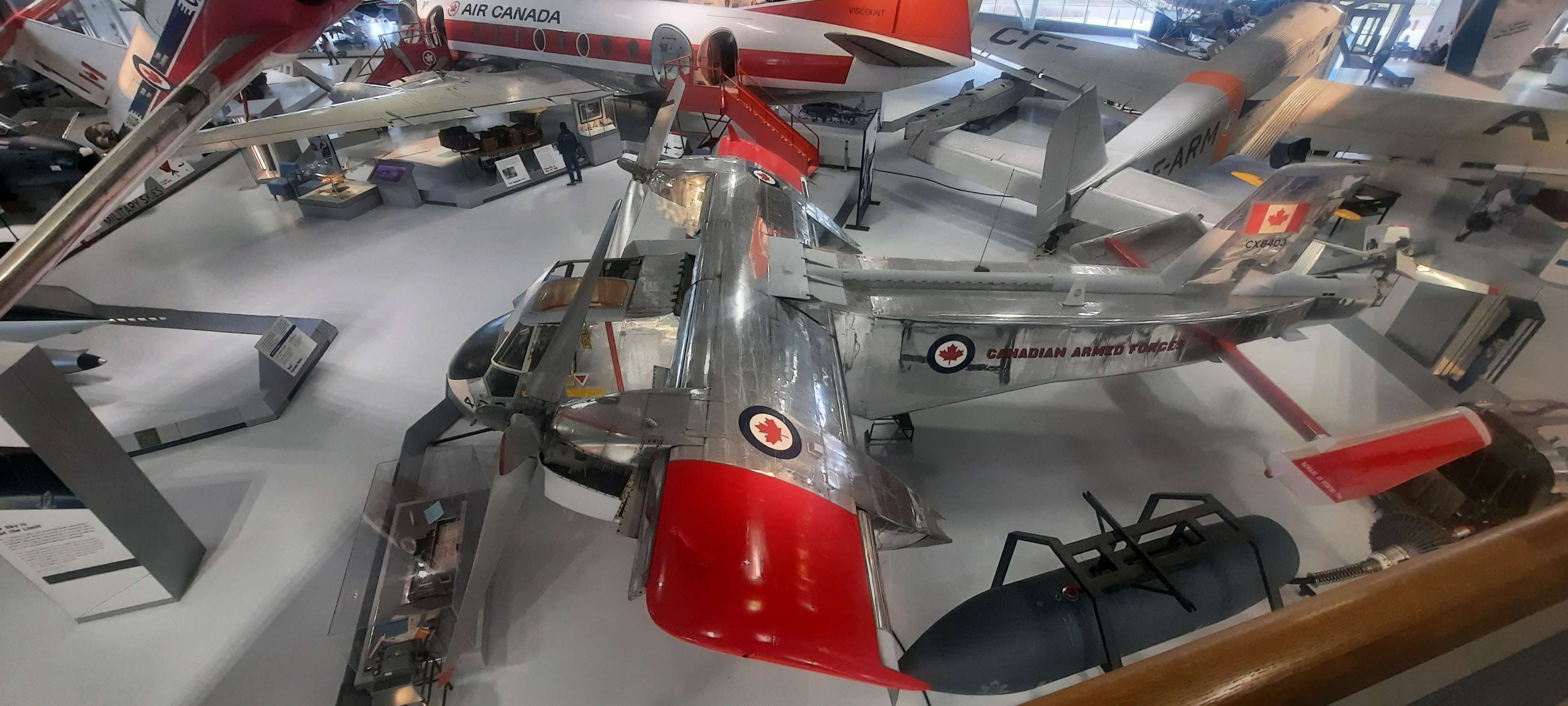
Canadair CL-84 Dynavert serial number CX8403 on display at the Royal Aviation Museum of Western Canada, in Winnipeg, Manitoba

The two remaining CL-84s ended up in museums. CX8402 resides in the Canada Aviation Museum in Ottawa alongside the Avro Arrow.

CX8403 was never flown and was donated to the Royal Aviation Museum of Western Canada, where it was restored and is now on display as part of the permanent collection.

== Specifications (CL-84-1) ==
Data from Jane's All The World's Aircraft 1971–72

General characteristics

- Crew: 2
- Capacity: 12 passengers
- Length: 47 ft 3.5 in (14.415 m)
- Wingspan: 34 ft 4 in (10.46 m)
- Height: 14 ft 3 in (4.34 m)
- Wing area: 233.3 sq ft (21.67 m^{2})
- Airfoil: NACA 63_{3}-418
- Empty weight: 8,417 lb (3,818 kg)
- Max takeoff weight: 14,500 lb (6,577 kg) (STOL), 12,600 lb (5,710 kg) (VTOL)
- Maximum width over propeller tips:34 ft 8 in (10.56 m)
- Maximum height over propellers during wing tilt: 17 ft 1½ in (5.22 m)
- Powerplant: 2 × Lycoming T53 shaft-turbines, 1,500 shp (1,100 kW) each
- Main rotor diameter: 14 ft 0 in (4.27 m)
- Propellers: 4-bladed, 14 ft 0 in (4.27 m) diameter

Performance

- Maximum speed: 321 mph (517 km/h, 279 kn)
- Cruise speed: 301 mph (484 km/h, 262 kn)
- Never exceed speed: 415 mph (668 km/h, 361 kn)
- Range: 421 mi (678 km, 366 nmi) with max wing fuel, VTOL, & 10% reserves
- Rate of climb: 4,200 ft/min (21 m/s)
- Disk loading: 195 kg/m^{2}
- Power loading: 1.35 kg/kW

== See also ==
Aircraft of comparable role, configuration, and era

- Bell XV-3 – Experimental tiltrotor aircraft to explore convertiplane technologies
- Bell XV-15 – American experimental tiltrotor aircraft
- Curtiss-Wright X-19 – Experimental VTOL tiltrotor quadcopter airplane
- Hiller X-18 – Experimental cargo transport aircraft
- Kaman K-16B – Type of aircraft
- LTV XC-142 – Experimental military tilt-wing aircraft
- Vertol VZ-2 – Experimental helicopter by Vertol, later Boeing

Related lists

- List of experimental aircraft – List of aircraft produced by a number of countries to test new concepts and technology
- List of VTOL aircraft – List of "VTOL" (Vertical Take-off and Landing) aircraft

== Bibliography ==
- Boniface, Patrick. "Tilt-wing Testing". Aeroplane, Vol. 28, no. 3, March 2000, pp. 72–78.
- "Canada Aviation Museum CL-84 page." Canada Aviation Museum CL-84 page. Retrieved: 9 October 2006.
- "CL-84 Aircraft Operating Instructions". available on CD from http://www.flight-manuals-on-cd.com
- Phillips, F.C. "The Canadair CL-84 Experimental Aircraft - Lessons Learned". AIAA-1990-3205, AHS, and ASEE, Aircraft Design, Systems and Operations Conference, Dayton, OH, 17–19 September 1990.
- Phillips, F.C. "The Canadair CL-84 Tilt-Wing V/STOL Programme". The Aeronautical Journal of the Royal Aeronautical Society, Vol. 73, No. 704, August 1969.
- Phillips, Frederick C. "Lessons Learned: The Development of the Canadair CL-84 Dynavert, Experimental V/STOL Research Aircraft". CAHS Journal, Volume 30, No. 3, Fall 1992.
- Pickler, Ron and Larry Milberry. Canadair: The First 50 Years. Toronto: CANAV Books, 1995. ISBN 0-921022-07-7.
- Taylor, John W.R. (editor). Jane's All The World's Aircraft 1971–72. London: Sampson Low, 1971. ISBN 0-354-00094-2.
- Zuk, Bill. "Dynamic Dynavert". Canadian Aviator, Vol. 14, no. 6, November/December 2004. Vancouver: OP Publishing Ltd. pp. 33–38.
- Kārlis Irbītis "Of Struggle and Flight". — Canada's Wings Inc., Stittsville, Ontario 1986. ISBN 0-920002-36-6.
