= Heinkel HD 30 =

1920s German-Swedish aircraft

HD 30

General information
- Type: Reconnaissance seaplane
- National origin: Germany
- Manufacturer: Heinkel
- Designer: Ernst Heinkel
- Number built: 2

History
- First flight: 1928

The Heinkel HD 30 was a biplane reconnaissance seaplane developed by Ernst Heinkel Flugzeugwerke.

== Development ==
The Heinkel HD 30 was similar in layout to the Heinkel HD 19, but differed from the latter in being larger and having a Gnome-Rhône 9Ak Jupiter VI engine. It was intended to be launched from a steam-powered catapult mounted on small- and medium-sized ships.

== Specifications ==
Data from

General characteristics

- Crew: Two
- Length: 10.25 m (33 ft 8 in)
- Wingspan: 12.40 m (40 ft 8 in)
- Height: 4.32 m (14 ft 2 in)
- Wing area: 46.89 m^{2} (504.7 sq ft)
- Empty weight: 1,947 kg (4,292 lb)
- Gross weight: 2,529 kg (5,575 lb)
- Powerplant: 1 × Gnome-Rhône 9Ak Jupiter VI 9-cylinder air-cooled radial piston engine, 390 kW (520 hp)
- Propellers: 2-bladed

Performance

- Maximum speed: 211 km/h (131 mph, 114 kn)
- Cruise speed: 185 km/h (115 mph, 100 kn)
- Range: 700 km (430 mi, 380 nmi)
- Service ceiling: 4,650 m (15,260 ft)
- Wing loading: 47 kg/m^{2} (9.6 lb/sq ft)
