= Västmanland Wing =

- Västmanlands flygflottilj
- Active: 1929–1983
- Country: Sweden
- Allegiance: Swedish Armed Forces
- Branch: Swedish Air Force
- Type: Wing
- Part of: 1st Air Command (1938–40, 1942–48); 3rd Air Command (1948–1966); Eastern Military District (1966–1974)
- Garrison/HQ: Västerås
- Motto(s): Per aspera ad astra ("Through hardships to the stars")
- March: "Prinz Friedrich Carl-Marsch" (Bilse) (Note: The march was adopted and established in 1943. It was used by the Västmanland Regiment from 1993 to 1997 and the Västmanland Group (Västmanlandsgruppen) from 1998 to 2004.)

Insignia
- Roundel

Aircraft flown
- Bomber: B 3, B 4, B 5, B 17, B 18
- Fighter: J 1, J 4, J 5, J 6, J 7, J 8, J 30, J 33, J 32B, J 35F
- Multirole helicopter: Hkp 3B
- Reconnaissance: S 5, S 6
- Trainer: Sk 6, Sk 9, Sk 10, Sk 11, Sk 12, Sk 15, Sk 16, Sk 50
- Transport: Tp 5, Tp 7, Tp 9, Tp 83
- G 101, Se 102, Se 103, Se 104, A 1, P 1, P 5, Ö 6, Ö 9

Västmanland Wing (Swedish: Västmanlands flygflottilj), also F 1 Hässlö, or simply F 1, is a former Swedish Air Force wing with the main base located at Hässlö Airport in Västerås in central Sweden.

== History ==
The 1st Flying Corps was set up near Västerås City on 1 July 1929 on the grounds of the recently disbanded Västmanland Regiment (I 18). The airfield at Hässlö was brought in use in 1931.

In 1936, the 1st Flying Corps was redesignated F 1 as the 1st Air Wing and received B 3 bombers. These were later supplemented with B 4 dive bombers.

In 1949, F 1 was reorganized as a night fighter wing with 60 surplus J 30 De Havilland Mosquitos from England. They were in turn replaced by 60 J 33 Venoms in 1952. All of the J 30 and J 33 in Sweden were based at F 1.

In 1959, the night fighter squadrons were converted to regular fighter squadrons of J 32B. These were in service until 1968 when they were in turn replaced with J 35F until the decommissioning of the wing in 1983.

The airfield is known today as Stockholm-Västerås Airport (IATA: VST, ICAO: ESOW) with daily flights to England and charter to Mediterranean destinations.

== Barracks and training areas ==
=== Barracks ===
The unit was from 1927 to 1944 located in the former Västmanland Regiment's (I 18) barracks in Viksäng outside Västerås. Its staff moved on 1 August 1943 to the Hässlö Airfield where new barracks were also ready the following year. The old barracks area was then taken over by the Swedish Air Force Central Ground Training Schools (Flygvapnets centrala skolor, FCS) until their final relocation in 1961 to Halmstad. The wing had one runway in the north-south direction.

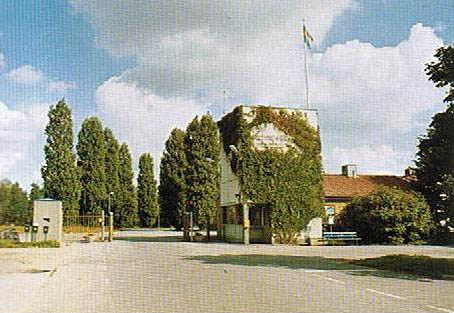
Guardhouse (1979)

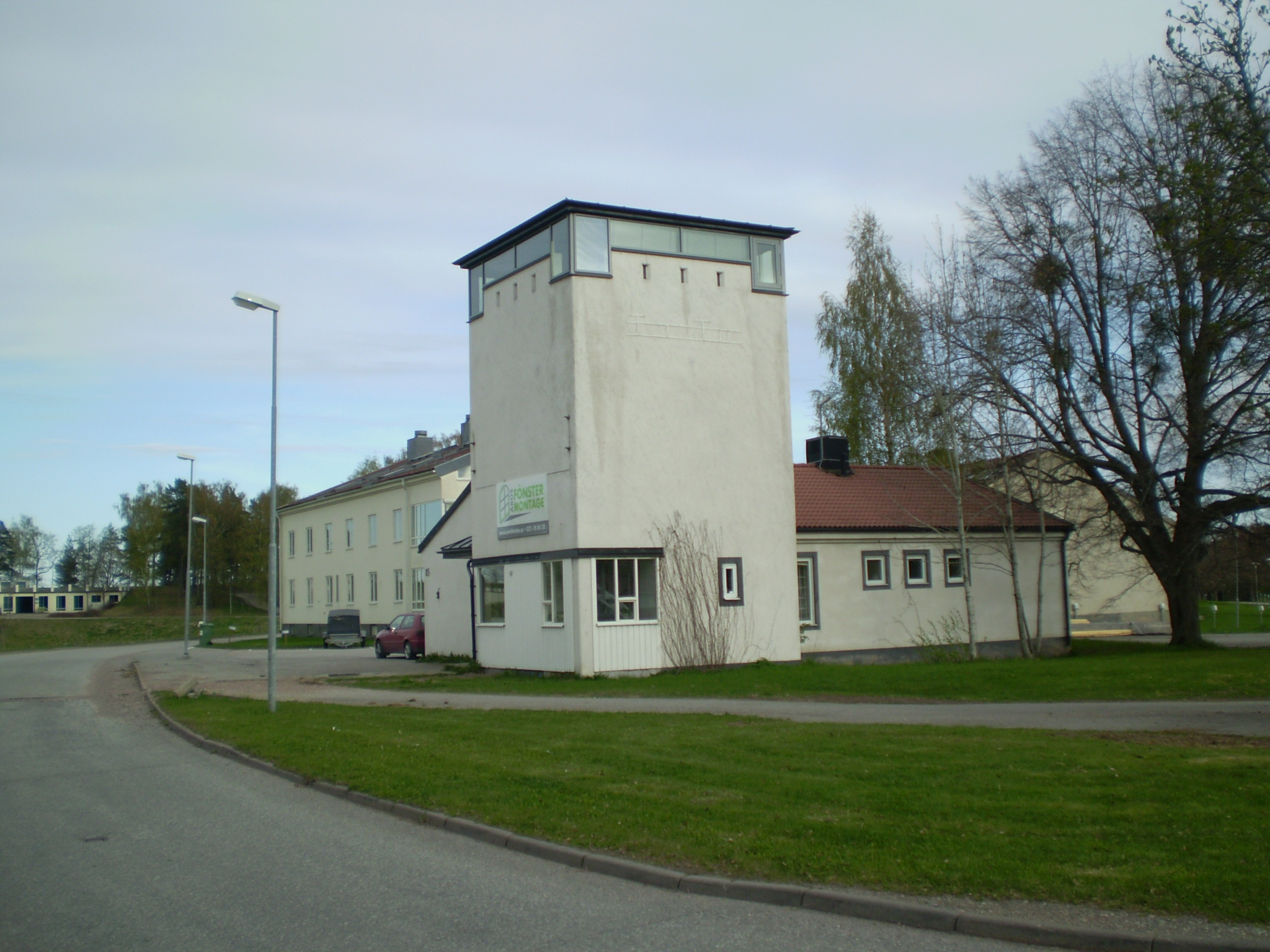
Guardhouse (2010)

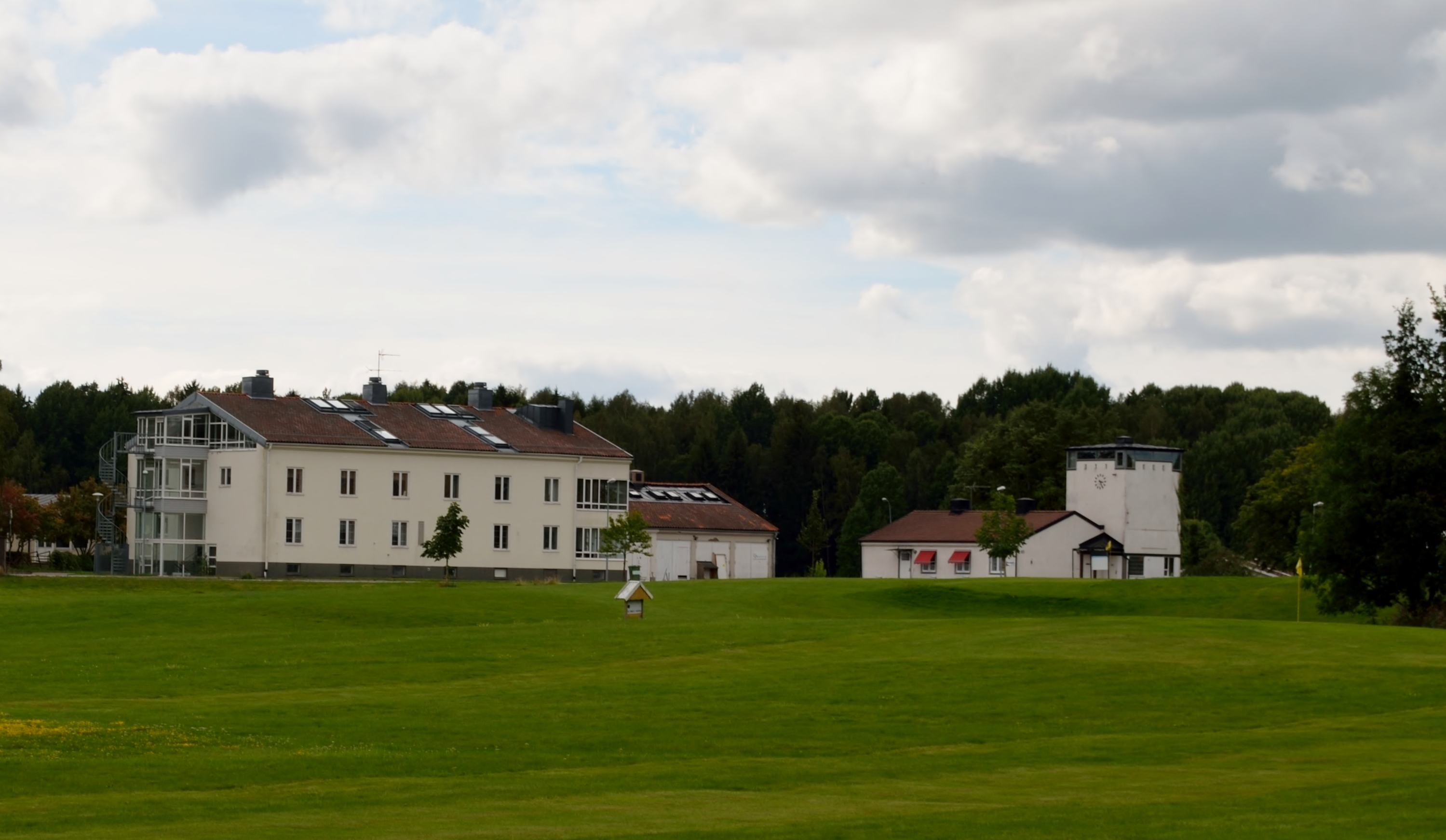
View of the guardhouse, barracks and rescue station

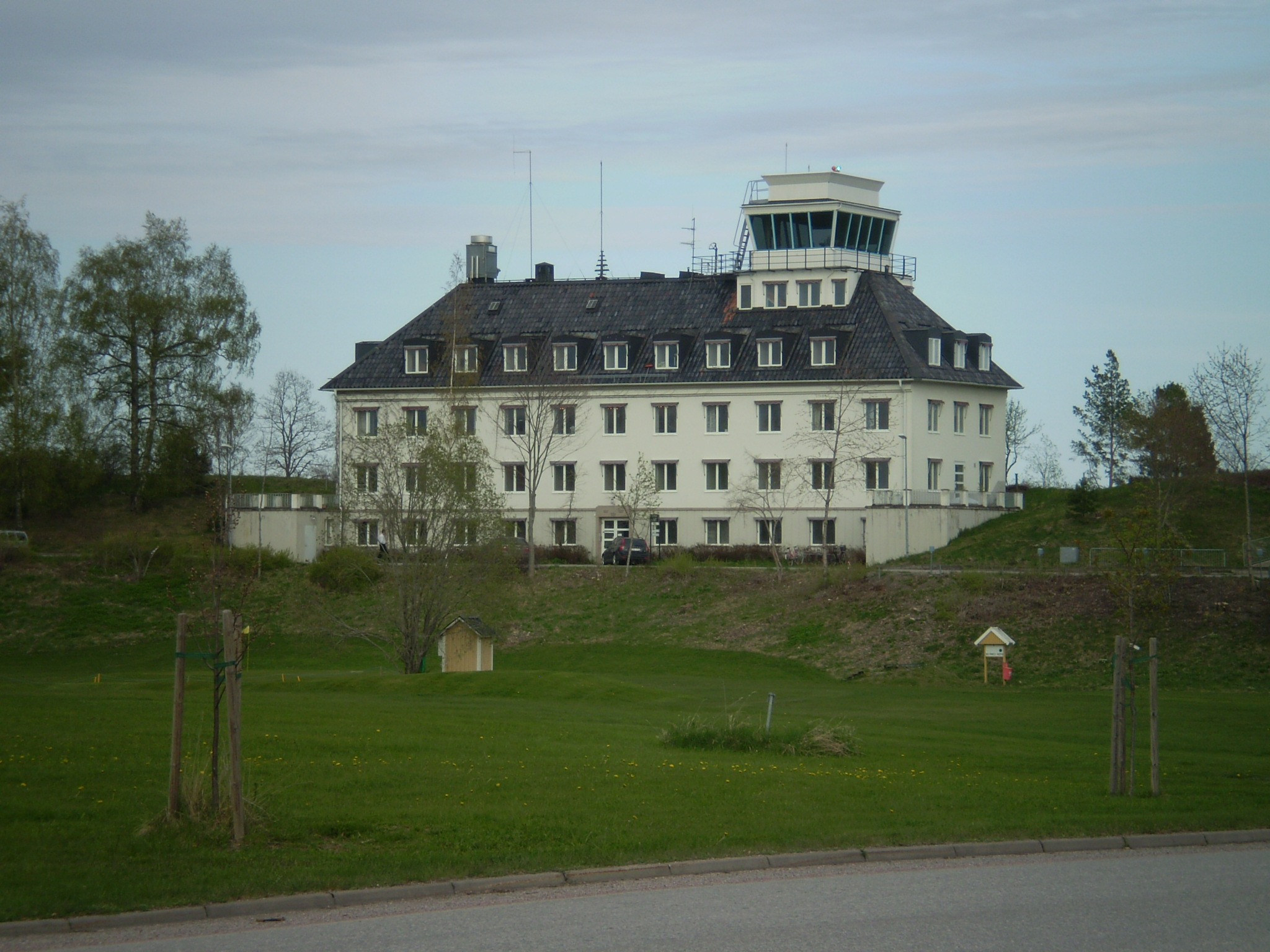
Chancellery and traffic control tower (2010)

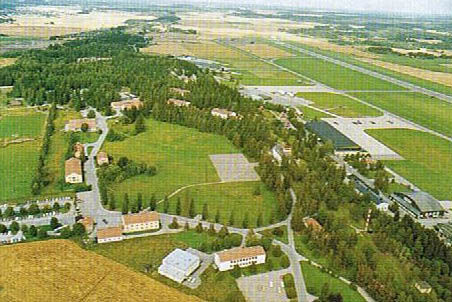
The wing and runway (1979) to the north

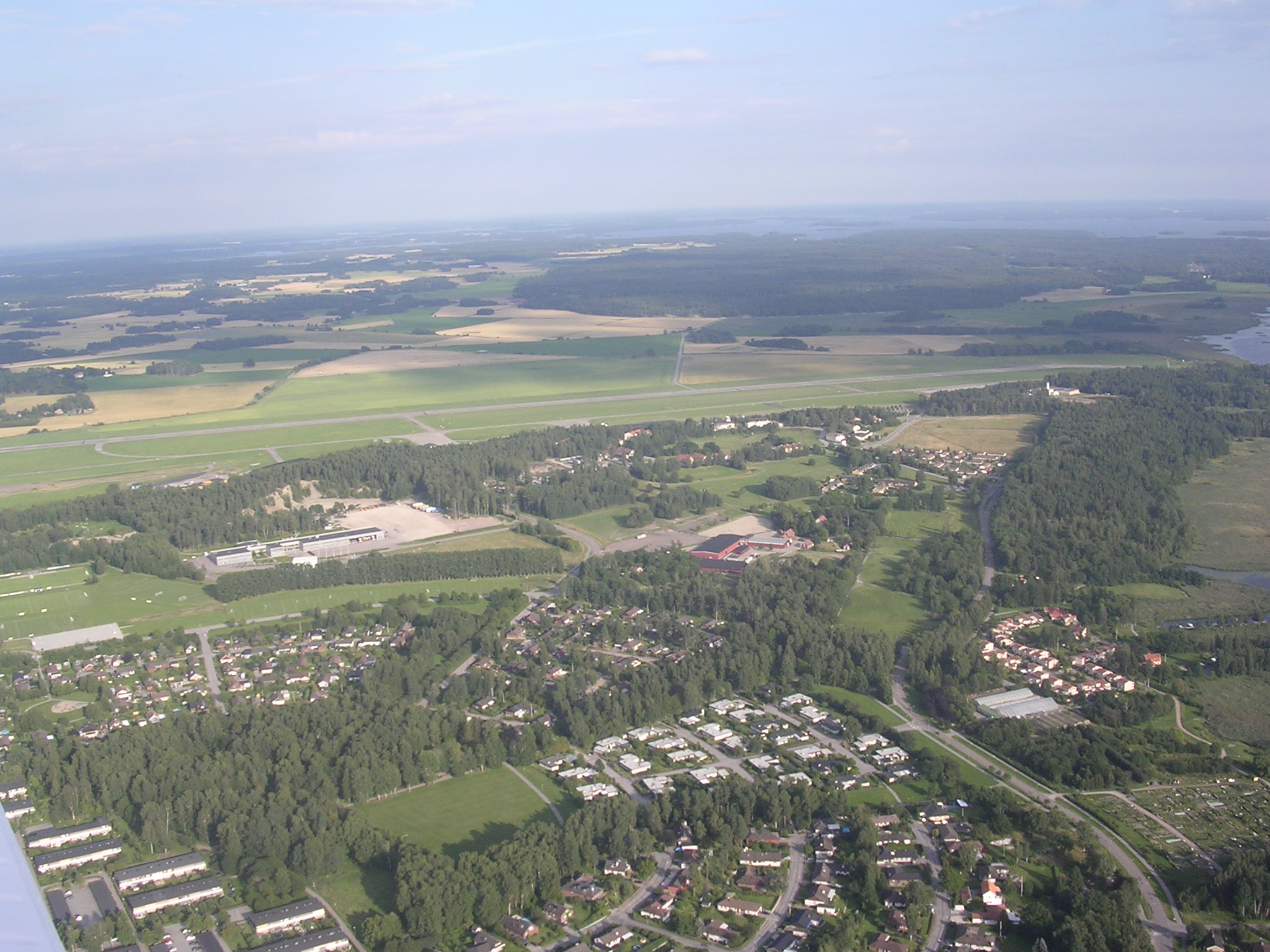
The wing and runway seen (2009) to the east

=== Training areas ===
The wing's training areas included Hässlö Airfield from 1931 and Gimpelstenarna in Granfjärden and the southern tip of Kärrbolandet during the 1930s.

== Heraldry and traditions ==
=== Coat of arms ===
Blazon: "The provincial badge of Västmanland, a three-pointed mountain argent, flammant proper".

=== Colours, standards and guidons ===
A colour was presented to the wing on 16 June 1938 at Gärdet in Stockholm by His Majesty the King Gustaf V on his 80th birthday. At the disbandment of F 1 closure in 1983, it was handed over to the wing's traditional carrier F 16, but is now preserved at the Swedish Army Museum. Blazon: "On blue cloth in the centre the badge of the Air Force; a winged two-bladed propeller under a royal crown proper. In the first corner the provincial badge of Västmanland, a three-pointed mountain, flammant proper".

The colour of Västmanland Regiment (I 18) was used until the regiment was disbanded in 1927. According to government decision on 11 December 1942, the wing would also carry this colour as a traditional colour from 26 September 1943. The colour was presented to the wing on this date by Lieutenant General Richard Åkerman. This colour also included the regimental battle honours, and the wing then became Sweden's only wing with battle honours on its colour. The colour was used until Västmanland Wing was disbanded in 1983.

Svea Air Corps' (F 8) colour was deposited in 1974 at the Västmanland Wing.

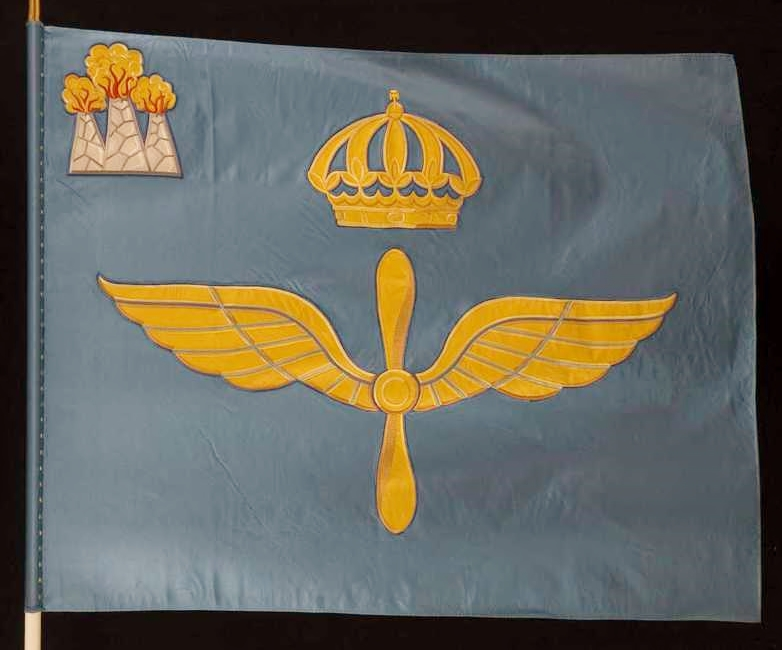
1938 colour.

=== March ===
”Kungl Västmanlands regementes och flygflottiljs marsch” was composed during the 1880s by Benjamin Bilse under the name "Prinz Friedrich Carl-(Sieges-) Marsch". The march was used by Västmanland Regiment (I 18) from the 1880s, then transferred to the wing and by decision of the Chief of the Army, Lieutenant General Åke Sagrén in 1991, to Västmanland Defence District (Västmanlands försvarsområde, Fo 48) prior to the inauguration of Fo 48's new staff building at Viksäng in Västerås. This unit was from 1 July 1994 again referred to as Västmanland Regiment (Fo 48).

== Commanding officers ==
From 1929 to 1936, the commanding officers was referred to as kårchef ("corps commander") and had the rank of major. When the wing organization was introduced in 1936, the commanding officer was referred to as flottiljchef ("wing commander"), and had the rank of lieutenant colonel. At the end of the 1940s, the wing commander got the rank of colonel. From 1975 to 1981, the wing commander was referred to as sektorflottiljchef ("sector wing commander") and had the rank of senior colonel. From 1981 to 1983, the commanding officer was again referred to as flottiljchef ("wing commander"), and had the rank of colonel.

=== Corps, wing and sector wing commanders ===
Commanders:

- 1929–1934: Harald Enell
- 1934–1937: Egmont Tornberg
- 1937–1938: Gustav Ström
- 1938–1942: Axel Ljungdahl
- 1942–1945: Gustaf Adolf Westring
- 1945–1950: Arthur Falk
- 1950–1954: Ingvar Berg
- 1954–1959: Gösta Odqvist
- 1959–1964: Henrik Nordström
- 1964–1966: Rolf Svartengren
- 1966–1968: Nils Palmgren
- 1968–1975: Tore Persson
- 1975–1976: Börje Björkholm (acting)
- 1976–1980: Stig Bruse
- 1980–1983: Börje Björkholm

=== Deputy sector wing commanders ===
In order to relieve the sector wing commander, a deputy sector wing commander position was added in 1975. Its task was to lead the unit procurement, a task largely similar to the old wing commander position. Hence he was also referred to as flottiljchef ("wing commander"). The deputy sector wing commander had the rank of colonel. On 30 June 1981, the deputy sector wing commander position was terminated.

- 1975–1979: Börje Björkholm
- 1980–1981: Knut Osmund

== Names, designations and locations ==
Name	Translation	From		To
Första flygkåren	1st Air Corps	1929-07-01	–	1936-06-30
Kungl. Västmanlands flygflottilj	Royal Västmanland Wing	1936-07-01	–	1974-12-31
Västmanlands flygflottilj	Västmanland Wing	1975-01-01	–	1976-12-31
Västmanlands flygflottilj och luftförsvarssektor O5	Västmanland Wing and Air Defense Sector O5	1977-01-01	–	1981-06-30
Västmanlands flygflottilj	Västmanland Wing; Västmanland Air Group	1981-07-01	–	1983-06-30
Designation		From		To
F 1		1929-07-01	–	1976-12-31
F 1/Se O5		1977-01-01	–	1981-06-30
F 1		1981-07-01	–	1983-06-30
Location		From		To
Viksäng		1929-07-01	–	1944-07-31
Västerås (Hässlö) Airport		1944-08-01	–	1983-06-30

== See also ==
- List of military aircraft of Sweden
