= Heinkel HE 6 =

1920s German floatplane

HE 6
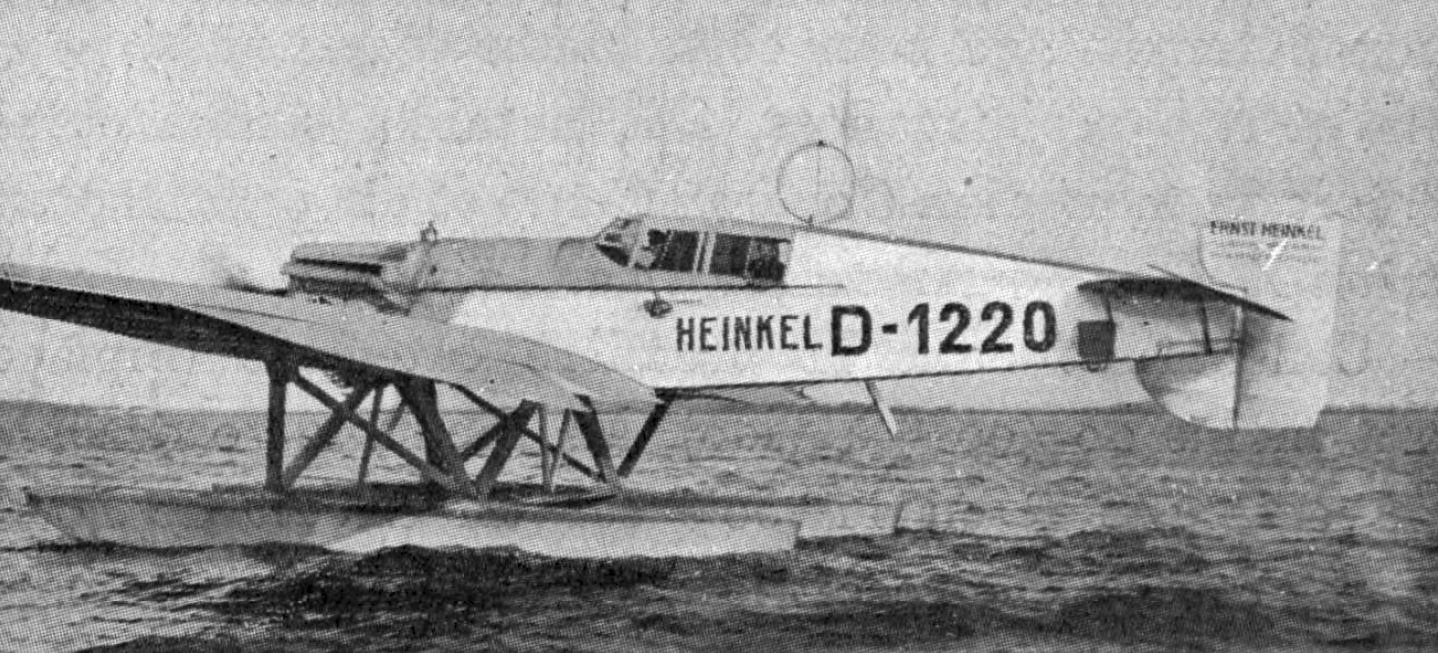

General information
- Type: Mail plane
- National origin: Germany
- Designer: Ernst Heinkel
- Number built: 1

History
- First flight: 2 August 1927
- Variant: Heinkel HE 10

The Heinkel HE 6 was a single-seat floatplane developed by the German aeronautical company Heinkel Flugzeugwerke in the late 1920s.

== Development ==
In the 1920s many aviators attempted the venture to cross the Atlantic even if they lost their lives when on 21 May 1927, after a flight of 33 hours and 30 minutes, Charles Lindbergh made the venture from New York to Paris. The most difficult task on the contrary still remained to be done, since the winds on the Atlantic were mainly blowing from east to west. 11 months later Koehl von Hünefeld und Fitzmaurice performed the business on a Junkers W 33.

In 1927 the construction of this aircraft was presented as a private initiative by Ernst Heinkel but in reality behind it were the Reichsmarine and the Hamburg-America Line. The naval command had requested the Lorenz and Telefunken companies to develop radios for aircraft destined for the enterprise but the involvement of the military, as the development and construction of military aircraft was forbidden to the Germans according to the terms of the Treaty of Versailles.

The Hamburg-America Line ( HAPAG ) was one of the largest shipping companies in the world based in Hamburg. It had developed in the second half of the 1920s and was rather interested in aviation to the point of having established a special section "Luftfahrt" (aviation). HAPAG financed two projects:

- an all-metal trimotor seaplane, Junkers G 24h1e (serial number 923), of the Swedish subsidiary "AB Flygindustri" of Junkers based in Linhamn taken Malmö. The plane was nicknamed "Taube" (pigeon).
- the HE 6 (c/n 286, regn. D-1220) of a more traditional setting as it was constructed of wood and canvas steel tubes. The plane was a further development of the Hansa-Brandenburg W.29 designed by Ernst Heinkel himself in 1918. The plane was nicknamed "Schwalbe" (swallow).

While the G 24 remained the property of Junkers Flugzeug- und Motorenwerke AG, the HE 6 passed to HAPAG for around 120,000 marks (engine excluded). HAPAG also assumed other costs such as insurance, fuel, personnel, organization with 245,000 and 180,000 marks respectively for the G 24 and the HE 6.

== Variants ==
HE 6a
The HE 6 as originally built, powered by a BMW VIa V-12 engine.
HE 6b
The HE 6a re-engined with a Packard 3A-2500, on loan from Severa GmbH.

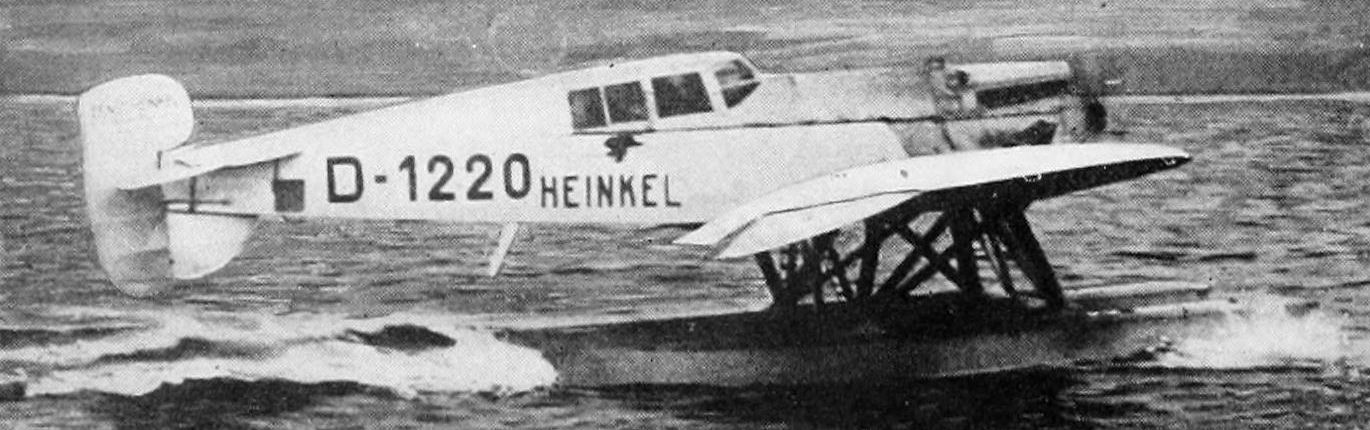
D-1220 from the right hand side

== Specifications (HE6b) ==
Data from

General characteristics

- Crew: 2
- Length: 13.18 m (43 ft 3 in)
- Wingspan: 18.20 m (59 ft 9 in)
- Height: 4.65 m (15 ft 3 in)
- Wing area: 60.93 m^{2} (655.8 sq ft)
- Empty weight: 2,800 kg (6,173 lb)
- Gross weight: 6,000 kg (13,228 lb)
- Powerplant: 1 × Packard 3A-2500 V-12 water-cooled piston engine, 600 kW (800 hp)
- Propellers: 2-bladed

Performance

- Maximum speed: 205 km/h (127 mph, 111 kn)
- Cruise speed: 180 km/h (110 mph, 97 kn)
- Range: 1,680 km (1,040 mi, 910 nmi)
- Service ceiling: 2,350 m (7,710 ft)
