= Heinkel =

German aircraft manufacturing company (1922–1965)

Heinkel Flugzeugwerke
- Industry: Aerospace
- Founded: 1922
- Founder: Ernst Heinkel
- Defunct: 1965
- Fate: Acquired
- Successor: Vereinigte Flugtechnische Werke (VFW)
- Headquarters: Warnemünde, Mecklenburg-Vorpommern, Germany
- Key people: Robert Lusser
- Services: Aircraft engines

Heinkel Flugzeugwerke (German pronunciation: [ˈhaɪŋkəl ˈfluːktsɔʏkˌvɛʁkə]) was a German aircraft manufacturing company founded by and named after Ernst Heinkel. It is noted for producing bomber aircraft for the Luftwaffe in World War II and for important contributions to high-speed flight, with the pioneering examples of a successful liquid-fueled rocket and a turbojet-powered aircraft in aviation history, with both Heinkel designs' first flights occurring shortly before the outbreak of World War II in Europe.

== History ==
Following the successful career of Ernst Heinkel as the chief designer for the Hansa-Brandenburg aviation firm in World War I, Heinkel's own firm was established at Warnemünde in 1922, after the restrictions on German aviation imposed by the Treaty of Versailles were relaxed. By 1929, the firm's compressed air-powered catapults were in use on the German Norddeutscher Lloyd ocean-liners SS Bremen and Europa to launch short-range mail planes from the liners' decks.

The company's first post-World War I aircraft design success was the design of the all-metal, single-engined Heinkel He 70 Blitz high-speed mail plane and airliner for Deutsche Luft Hansa in 1932, which broke a number of air speed records for its class. It was followed by the two-engine Heinkel He 111 Doppel-Blitz, which became a mainstay of the Luftwaffe during World War II as a bomber. Heinkel's most important designers at this point were the twin Günter brothers, Siegfried and Walter, and Heinrich Hertel.

The firm's headquarters was in Rostock later known as Heinkel-Nord (Heinkel-North), located in what used to be named the Rostock-Marienehe neighborhood (today's Rostock-Schmarl community, along the west bank of the Unterwarnow estuary), where the firm additionally possessed a factory airfield along the coastline in the Rostock/Schmarl neighborhood roughly three kilometers (1.9 miles) north-northwest of the main offices, with a second Heinkel-Süd engineering and manufacturing facility in Schwechat, Austria, after the Anschluss in 1938.

=== World War II ===
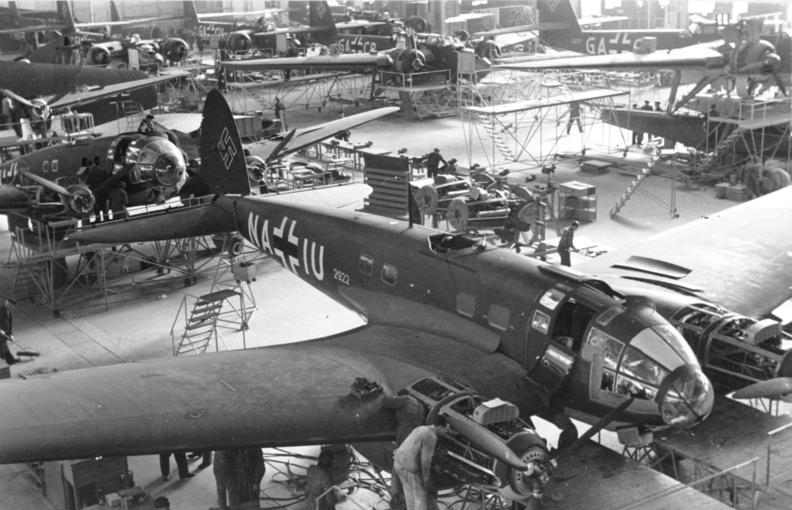
Production of the Heinkel He 111 in 1939

The Heinkel company is most closely associated with aircraft used by the Luftwaffe during World War II. This began with the adaptation of the He 70 and, in particular, the He 111, to be used as bombers. Heinkel also provided the Luftwaffe's only operational heavy bomber, the Heinkel He 177, although this was never deployed in significant numbers. The German Luftwaffe equipped both of these bombers with the Z-Gerät, Y-Gerät, and Knickebein, developed by Johannes Plendl, and thus they were among the first aircraft to feature advanced night navigation devices, common in all commercial airplanes today.

Heinkel was less successful in selling fighter designs. Before the war, the Heinkel He 112 had been rejected in favour of the Messerschmitt Bf 109, and Heinkel's attempt to top Messerschmitt's design with the Heinkel He 100 failed due to political interference within the Reichsluftfahrtministerium (RLM — Reich Aviation Ministry). The company also provided the Luftwaffe with an outstanding night fighter, the Heinkel He 219, which also suffered from politics and was produced only in limited numbers, but was the first Luftwaffe front-line aircraft to use retractable tricycle gear for its undercarriage design, and the world's first front-line military aircraft to use ejection seats. By contrast, the only heavy bomber to enter service with the Luftwaffe during the war years – the Heinkel He 177 Greif – turned out to be one of the most troublesome German wartime aircraft designs, plagued with numerous engine fires from both its inadequate engine nacelle design and its general airframe design being mis-tasked. The 30-meter (100 ft) class wingspan design was to be built to be able to perform moderate-angle dive bombing attacks from the moment of its approval by the RLM in early November 1937, until this was rescinded in September 1942.

From 1941 until the end of the war, the company was merged with engine manufacturer Hirth to form Heinkel-Hirth, giving the company the capability of manufacturing its own powerplants, including its Heinkel Strahltriebwerke turbojet engine manufacturing firm.

The Heinkel name was also behind pioneering work in jet engine and rocket development, and also the German aviation firm that attempted to popularize the use of retractable tricycle landing gear, a relative rarity in early WW II German airframe design. In 1939, flown by Erich Warsitz, the Heinkel He 176 and Heinkel He 178 became the first aircraft designs to fly under liquid-fuel rocket and turbojet power respectively.

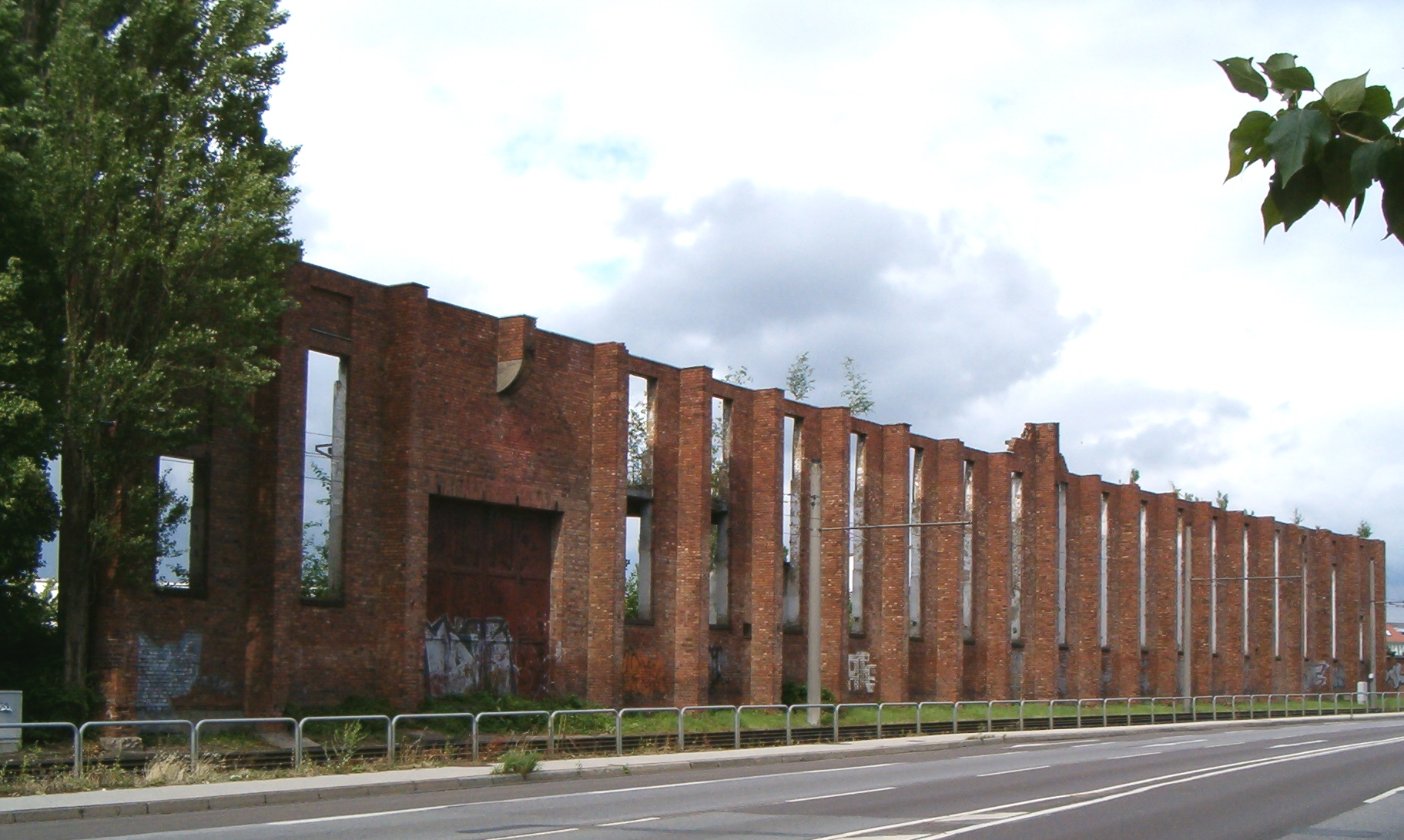
Ruins of the Heinkel headquarters offices in Rostock

Heinkel was the first to develop a jet fighter to prototype stage, the Heinkel He 280, the first Heinkel design to use and fly with retractable tricycle gear. In early 1942, the photographic interpretation unit at RAF Medmenham first saw evidence of the existence of the 280 in aerial reconnaissance photographs taken after a bombing raid on the Rostock factory. Thereafter, the Allies began intensive aerial reconnaissance intended to learn more about the German jet aircraft programme.

The He 219 night fighter design was the first German frontline combat aircraft to have retracting tricycle gear, and the first operational military aircraft anywhere to use ejection seats. Heinkel's He 280, the firm's only twin-jet aircraft design to fly never reached production, however, since the RLM wanted Heinkel to concentrate on bomber production and instead promoted the development of the rival Messerschmitt Me 262. Very late in the war, a Heinkel single-jet powered fighter finally took to the air as the Heinkel He 162A Spatz (sparrow) as the first military jet to use retractable tricycle landing gear, use a turbojet engine from its maiden flight forward, and use an ejection seat from the start, but it had barely entered service at the time of Germany's surrender.

=== Slave labour during World War II ===
Heinkel was a major user of Sachsenhausen concentration camp labour, using between 6,000 and 8,000 prisoners on the He 177 bomber.

=== Post-war ===
Entwicklungsring Süd EWR VJ 101A/He 231 Concept second iteration

Following the war, Heinkel was prohibited from manufacturing aircraft and instead built bicycles, motor scooters (see below), and the Heinkel microcar. The company eventually returned to aircraft in the mid-1950s, licence building Lockheed Martin F-104 Starfighters for the West German Luftwaffe. In 1965, the company was absorbed by Vereinigte Flugtechnische Werke (VFW), which was in turn absorbed by Messerschmitt-Bölkow-Blohm in 1980 and later became part of Airbus.

Entwicklungsring Süd, a research and development conglomeration in a joint venture with Bölkow and Messerschmitt, designed the EWR VJ 101A/He 231, a VSTOL prototype, intended to protect West Germany's airfields against Soviet attack.

== Products ==
=== Aircraft ===
HD - Heinkel Doppeldecker

- Heinkel HD 14
- Heinkel HD 15
- Heinkel HD 16
- Heinkel HD 17
- Heinkel HD 19
- Heinkel HD 20
- Heinkel HD 21
- Heinkel HD 22
- Heinkel HD 23
- Heinkel HD 24 seaplane trainer (1926)
- Heinkel HD 25
- Heinkel HD 26
- Heinkel HD 27
- Heinkel HD 28
- Heinkel HD 29
- Heinkel HD 30
- Heinkel HD 32
- Heinkel HD 33
- Heinkel HD 34
- Heinkel HD 35
- Heinkel HD 36
- Heinkel HD 37 fighter (biplane)
- Heinkel HD 38 fighter (biplane)
- Heinkel HD 39
- Heinkel HD 40
- Heinkel HD 41
- Heinkel HD 43 fighter (biplane)
- Heinkel HD 44
- Heinkel HD 55 reconnaissance flying boat
- Heinkel HD 56 reconnaissance seaplane; built in Japan as the Aichi E3A

HE - Heinkel Eindecker

- Heinkel HE 1 low-wing floatplane (monoplane)
- Heinkel HE 2 improvement on the HE 1
- Heinkel HE 3
- Heinkel HE 4 reconnaissance (monoplane)
- Heinkel HE 5 reconnaissance (monoplane)
- Heinkel HE 6
- Heinkel HE 7
- Heinkel HE 8 reconnaissance (monoplane)
- Heinkel HE 9
- Heinkel HE 10
- Heinkel HE 12
- Heinkel HE 18
- Heinkel HE 31 HE 8 with a Packard 3A-2500 engine
- Heinkel HE 57 Heron, passenger flying boat (prototype); Heinkel's last flying boat and first all-metal aircraft
- Heinkel HE 58 enlarged HE 12

He - Heinkel (RLM designator)

- Heinkel He 42 seaplane trainer; originally HD 42
- Heinkel He 45 biplane light bomber; originally HD 45
- Heinkel He 46 reconnaissance/army co-operation monoplane; originally HD 46
- Heinkel He 47 trainer (project); existed as a mockup, but was lost in a factory fire in 1934
- Heinkel He 48 short-range reconnaissance (project); mockup inspected in 1935, but cancelled in 1936
- Heinkel He 49 biplane fighter; originally HD 49
- Heinkel He 50 reconnaissance + dive bomber (biplane); originally HD 50
- Heinkel He 51 biplane fighter developed from the He 49
- Heinkel He 52 high-altitude version of He 51 (prototype)
- Heinkel He 59 multirole biplane; originally HD 59
- Heinkel He 60 ship-borne reconnaissance (biplane seaplane); originally HD 60
- Heinkel He 61 export version of He 45 for China; originally HD 61
- Heinkel He 62 reconnaissance seaplane; originally HD 62
- Heinkel He 63 prototype trainer biplane; originally HD 63
- Heinkel He 64 sports plane; originally HE 64
- Heinkel He 65 single-engine, high-speed mail plane (project)
- Heinkel He 66 export version of He 50 for Japan; originally HD 66
- Heinkel He 70 Blitz (Lightning), high-speed single-engine mail plane, 1932
- Heinkel He 71 single-seat monoplane; shrunken He 64
- Heinkel He 72 Kadett (Cadet), trainer
- Heinkel He 74 biplane light fighter/advanced trainer (prototype); lost to the Fw 56 and Ar 76
- Heinkel He 100 fighter
- Heinkel He 111 medium bomber/airliner
- Heinkel He 112 fighter
- Heinkel He 113 (fictitious alternative designation for He 100D-1)
- Heinkel He 114 reconnaissance seaplane
- Heinkel He 115 military seaplane
- Heinkel He 116 long-range reconnaissance/mail plane
- Heinkel He 118 prototype dive bomber; lost to the Ju 87
- Heinkel He 119 experimental single-engine high-speed reconnaissance/bomber, 1937
- Heinkel He 120 four-engine long-range passenger flying boat (project), 1938; cancelled in favor of the BV 222
- Heinkel He 162 Spatz (sparrow), Volksjäger (People's Fighter) design competition choice, fighter (jet-engined)
- Heinkel He 170 export version of He 70 for Hungary
- Heinkel He 172 He 72B with NACA cowling (prototype)
- Heinkel He 176 pioneering liquid-fueled rocket-powered experimental aircraft (prototype)
- Heinkel He 177 Greif (Griffon), the Third Reich's only long-range heavy bomber
- Heinkel He 178 world's first jet-engined aircraft
- Heinkel He 179 variant of He 177 with four separate engines, not built
- Heinkel He 219 Uhu (Eagle-Owl), night fighter
- Heinkel He 220 four-engine long-range passenger flying boat (project), 1939; cancelled in favor of the BV 222
- Heinkel He 270 He 70 with DB 601 engine
- Heinkel He 274 high-altitude heavy bomber, He 177 development, two prototypes completed post-war in France
- Heinkel He 275 four-engine heavy bomber; project only
- Heinkel He 277 heavy bomber, paper-only Amerika Bomber He 177 development (by February 1943) with four BMW 801E radial engines, never built
- Heinkel He 278 four-engine turboprop bomber; project only
- Heinkel He 280 jet fighter; first jet fighter to fly
- Heinkel He 319 multirole aircraft (project); unrelated to the He 219
- Heinkel He 343 four-engine jet bomber (project), 1944
- Heinkel He 419 He 219 with longer wingspan and He 319 tail (project)
- Heinkel He 519, high-speed bomber (He 119 derivative; project only), 1944
- Heinkel Type 98 Medium Bomber - Planned He 111 variant for service with the IJNAS, never built
- Heinkel A7He He 112 development for the IJAAS
- Heinkel Navy Type He Interceptor Fighter He 100 development for the IJNAS

P - Projekt

- Heinkel P.1041 - He 177
- Heinkel P.1054
- Heinkel P.1060 - He 219
- Heinkel P.1062 - fighter (project), 1942
- Heinkel P.1063 - mid-wing fast attack aircraft (project), 1942
- Heinkel P.1064 - long-range mid-wing bomber with BMW 801Ea engine (project), 1943
- Heinkel P.1065 - fighter-bomber designs
- Heinkel P.1066 - ground attack aircraft with two BMW 801E or BMW Jumo 222C engines (project), 1942
- Heinkel P.1068 - He 343
- Heinkel P.1069 - mid-wing fighter with Junkers Jumo 004B engine (project), 1943
- Heinkel P.1070 - fighter-reconnaissance with two Junkers Jumo 004B engines (project), 1943
- Heinkel P.1071 - asymmetrical fuselage fighter with two Junkers Jumo 004B engines (project), 1943
- Heinkel P.1072 - Mid-wing bomber with four BMW 003A-0 engines (project) 1943
- Heinkel P.1073 - twin jet engine fighter (project); design evolved into the He 162
- Heinkel P.1074 - four engine fighter with BMW 801E engines (project), 1944
- Heinkel P.1075 - mid-wing long-range fighter with twin DB 603E engines (project), 1944
- Heinkel P.1076, a nearly conventional 1944 design, with slightly forward swept wings and contra-rotating propellers at the front.
- Heinkel P.1077 Julia/Romeo rocket-propulsion point-defense interceptor
- Heinkel P.1078 jet-powered interceptor designs; Emergency Fighter Program candidate
  - Heinkel He P.1078A, fighter (jet-engined) (project)
  - Heinkel He P.1078B, tailless fighter (jet-engined) (project)
  - Heinkel He P.1078C, tailless fighter (jet-engined) (project), 1944
- Heinkel P.1079 all-weather jet fighter designs
  - Heinkel He P.1079A, two-engine night-fighter (jet-engined) (project)
  - Heinkel He P.1079B/I, all-weather heavy fighter (flying wing design) (jet-engined)
  - Heinkel He P.1079B/II, all-weather heavy fighter (flying wing design) (jet-engined), 1945
- Heinkel P.1080 ramjet fighter (project); Emergency Fighter Program candidate
- Heinkel P.1084 - transport aircraft (project), 1942
- Heinkel Lerche (Lark) VTOL ground attack/fighter
- Heinkel Wespe (Wasp) VTOL tail sitter interceptor

=== Microcar ===
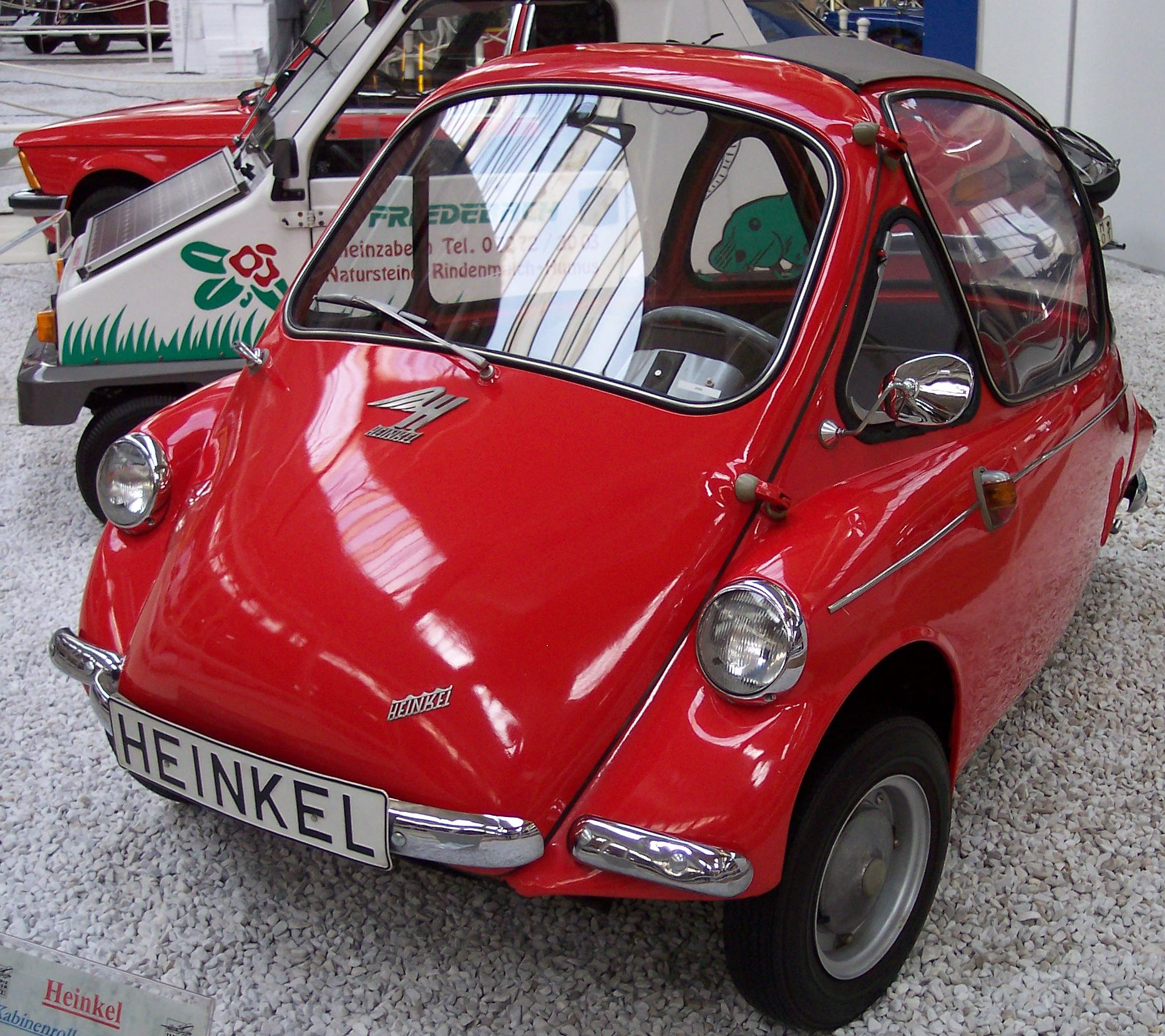
Heinkel Kabine

Heinkel introduced the "Kabine" bubble car in 1956. It competed with the BMW Isetta and the Messerschmitt KR200. It had a unit body and a four-stroke single-cylinder engine.

Heinkel stopped manufacturing the Kabine in 1958 but production continued under licence, first by Dundalk Engineering Company in Ireland and then by Trojan Cars Ltd., which ceased production in 1966.

=== Scooters ===
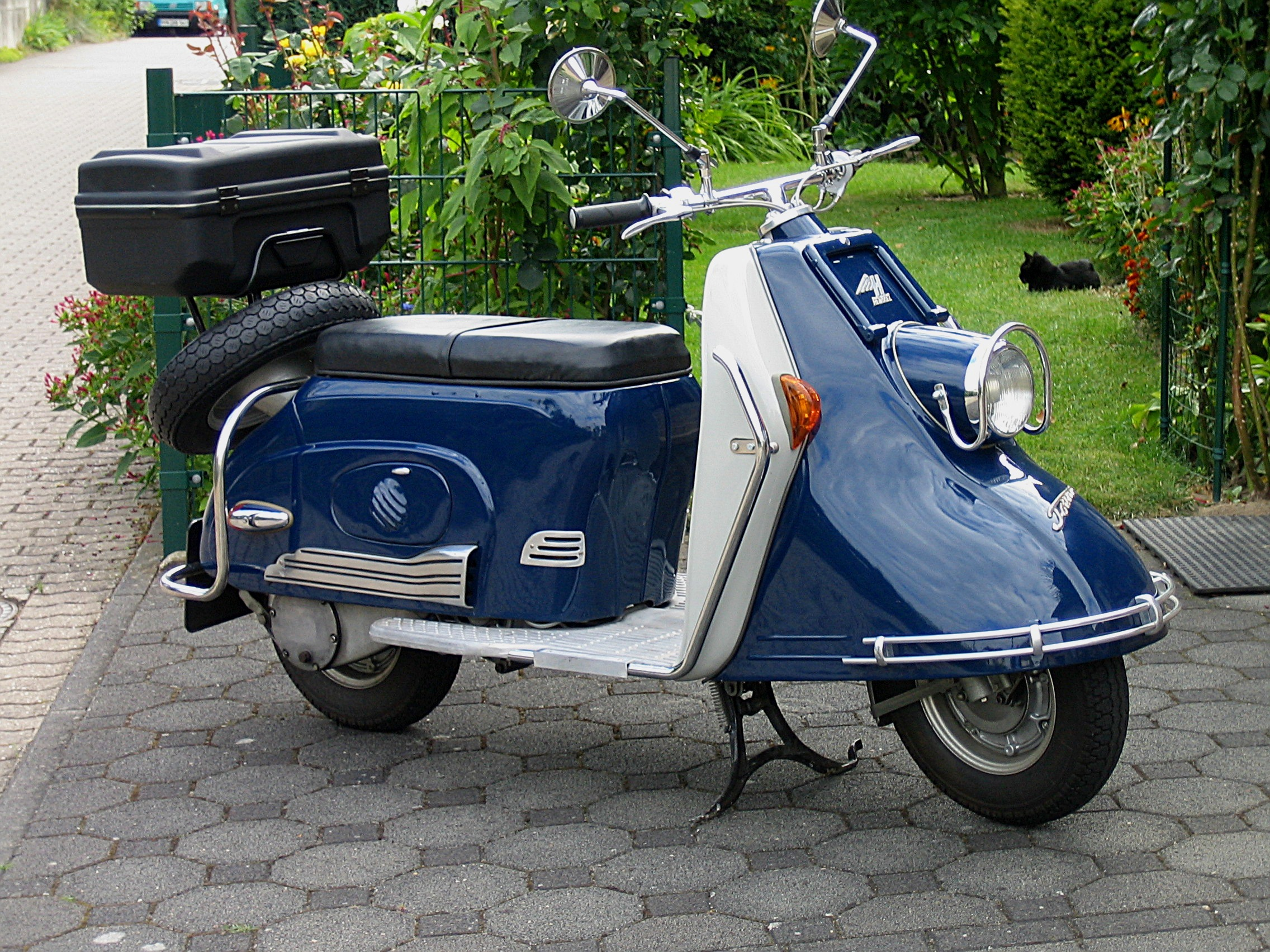
Heinkel Tourist 175 (1956)

Heinkel introduced the "Tourist" motor scooter in the 1950s which was known for its reliability. A large and relatively heavy touring machine, it provided good weather protection with a full fairing and the front wheel turning under a fixed nose extension. The "Tourist" had effective streamlining, perhaps unsurprising in view of its aircraft ancestry, and although it had only a 174 cc (10.6 cu in), 9.5 bhp 4-stroke engine, it was capable of sustaining speeds of up to 70 miles per hour (110 km/h) (official figures 58 miles per hour (93 km/h)), given time to get there.

Heinkel also made a lighter 150 cc (9.2 cu in) scooter called the Heinkel 150.

=== Mopeds ===
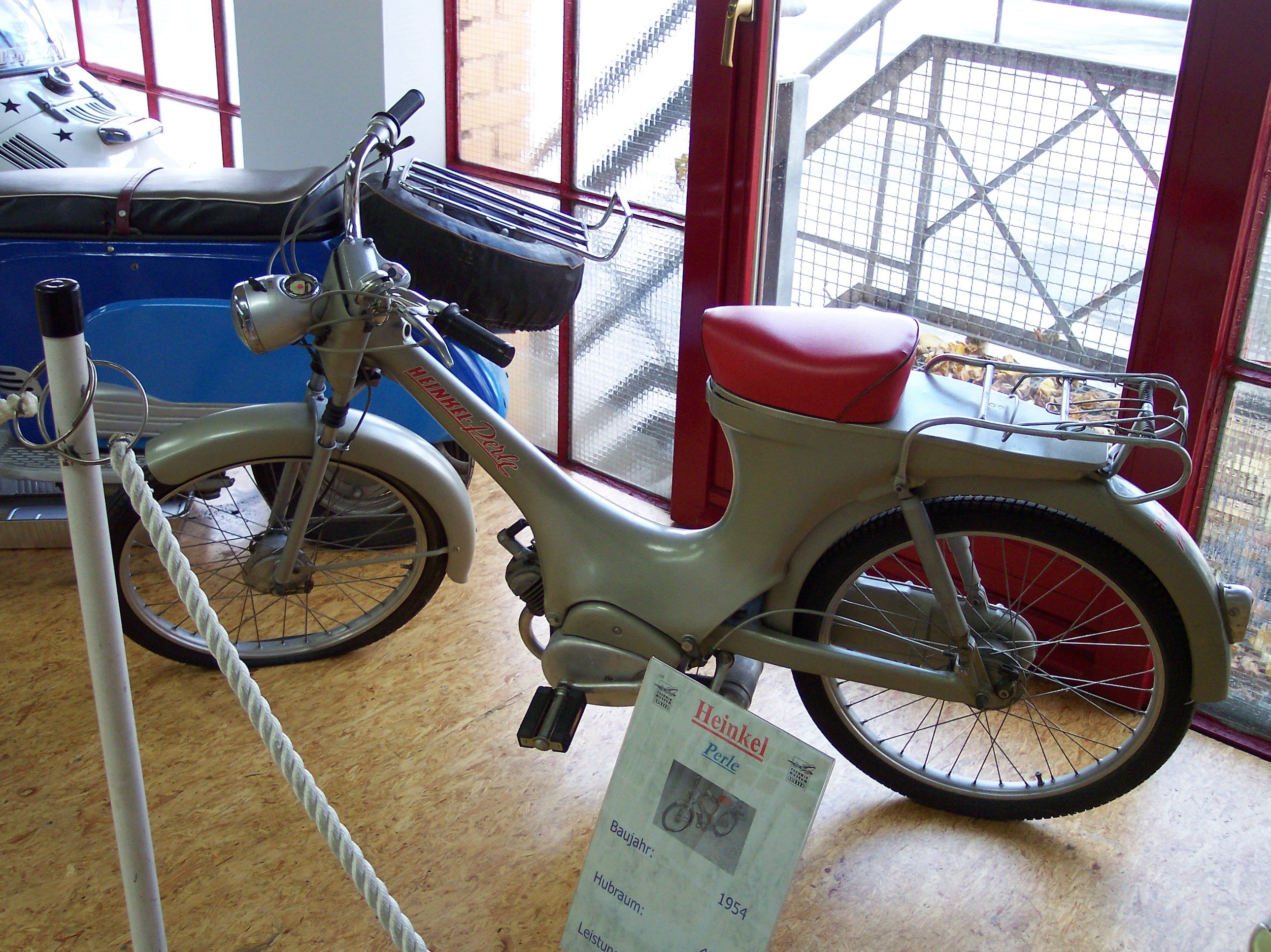
Heinkel Perle

Heinkel built the Perle moped from 1954 to 1957. The Perle was a sophisticated cycle with a cast alloy unit frame, rear suspension, a fully enclosed chain with part of the chain enclosure integral with the swingarm, and interchangeable wheels. This high level of sophistication came at a high cost. As with most mopeds, it had a two-stroke engine with a displacement of 50cc that operated on a mixture of gasoline and lubrication oil. Approximately twenty-seven thousand Perles were sold.

== See also ==
- List of RLM aircraft designations
- Maicoletta
- Zündapp Bella
- Jägerstab (Fighter Staff)
- Rüstungsstab (Armament Staff)
