= Heinkel HD 39 =

HD 39
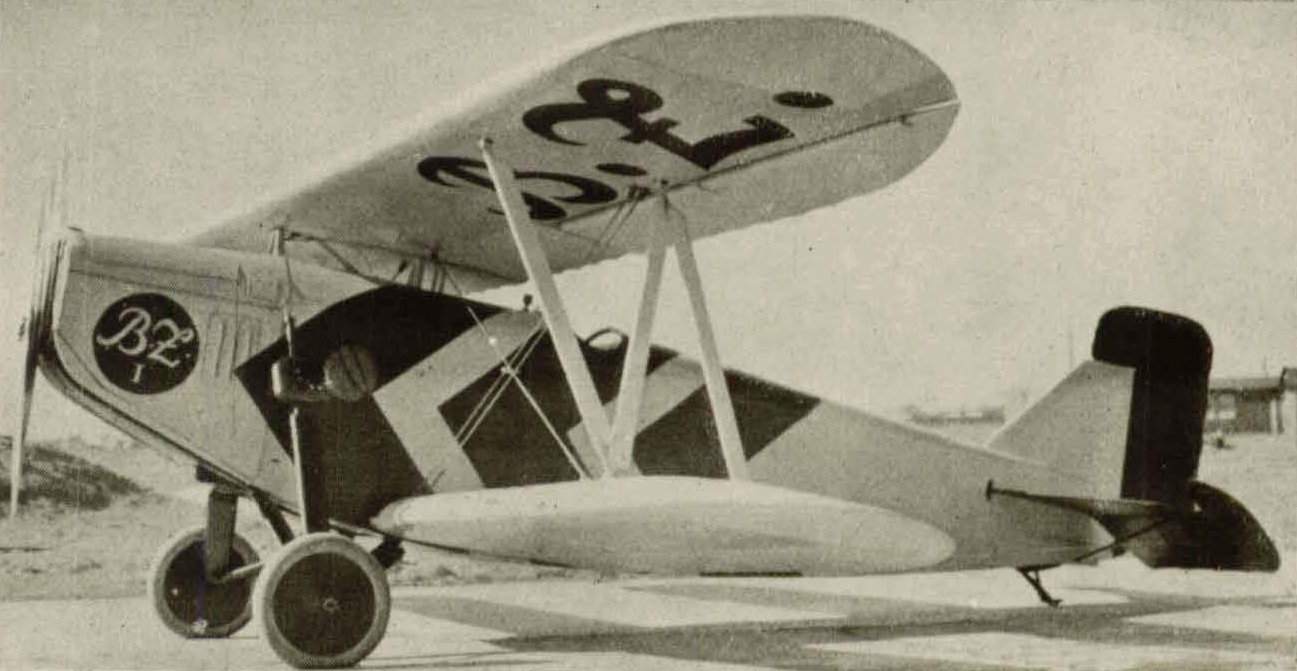

General information
- Type: Newspaper delivery aircraft
- National origin: Germany
- Manufacturer: Heinkel
- Primary user: Ullstein-Verlag
- Number built: 1

History
- First flight: 1926

The Heinkel HD 39 was a special-purpose cargo aircraft developed in Germany in the 1920s to distribute the Berlin newspaper B.Z.. It was a conventional single-bay biplane with staggered wings of equal span, and a fuselage that nearly filled the interplane gap. The pilot sat in an open cockpit, and the undercarriage was of fixed, tailskid type with divided main units. The sole example of the type was built after Ernst Heinkel found out, by chance, that B.Z. required such an aircraft and had ordered two machines from Albatros. Heinkel convinced publisher Ullstein-Verlag to purchase a third aircraft from his firm.

The design was based on the HD 27 mail plane, and had a specially designed payload bay to carry newspapers in 50 kg (110 lb) bundles. 10 separate compartments in the bay could be individually opened in flight in order to air-drop newspapers in places where the HD 39 could not land.

The HD 39 entered service alongside two Albatros L 72s in April 1926 and remained in Service until 1931, when distribution of B.Z. by air was taken over by Deutsche Luft Hansa.

== Specifications ==
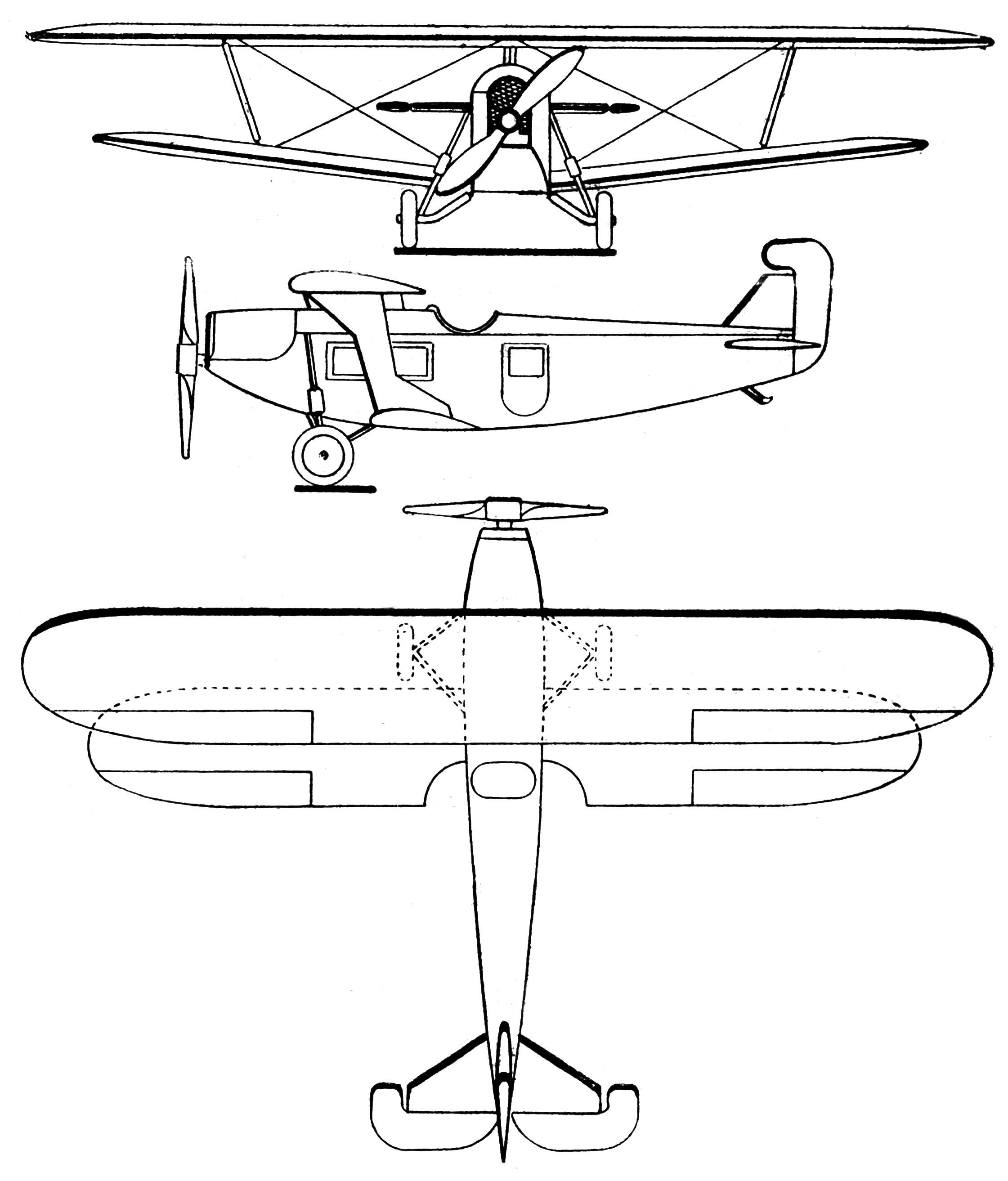
Heinkel HD-39 3-view drawing from Les Ailes July 1, 1926

Data from Jane's all the World's Aircraft 1928

General characteristics

- Crew: 2
- Capacity: 820 kg (1,810 lb) in a 2 m^{3} (71 cu ft) capacity cargo / mail / newspaper compartment with air-drop capability
- Length: 10 m (32 ft 10 in)
- Upper wingspan: 14.8 m (48 ft 7 in)
- Lower wingspan: 12.7 m (41 ft 8 in)
- Height: 3.7 m (12 ft 2 in)
- Wing area: 52.3 m^{2} (563 sq ft)
- Empty weight: 1,340 kg (2,954 lb)
- Gross weight: 2,160 kg (4,762 lb)
- Powerplant: 1 × BMW IV 6-cylinder water-cooled in-line piston engine, 170 kW (230 hp)
- Propellers: 2-bladed fixed pitch propeller

Performance

- Maximum speed: 166 km/h (103 mph, 90 kn)
- Landing speed: 68.5 km/h (42.6 mph; 37.0 kn)
- Time to altitude: 1,000 m (3,300 ft) in 6.6 minutes
- Wing loading: 41.1 kg/m^{2} (8.4 lb/sq ft)
- Power/mass: 0.0792 kW/kg (0.0482 hp/lb)
