= Heinkel HD 40 =

HD 40
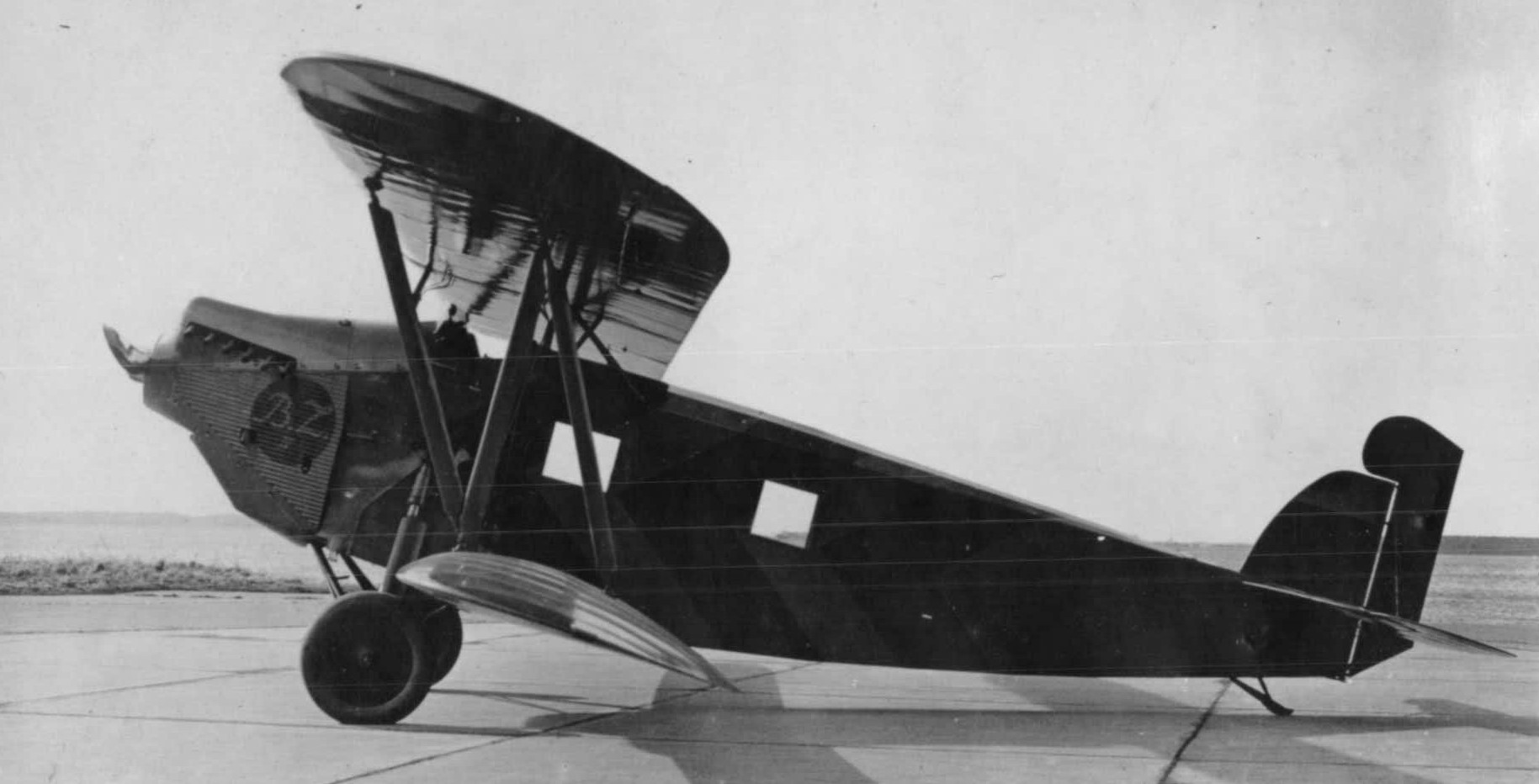

General information
- Type: Newspaper delivery aircraft
- National origin: Germany
- Manufacturer: Heinkel
- Primary user: Ullstein-Verlag
- Number built: 1

History
- First flight: 1927

The Heinkel HD 40 was a special-purpose cargo aircraft developed in Germany in the 1920s to distribute the Berlin newspaper B.Z.. The success of Heinkel's previous design for the publisher, the HD 39, led to the order of a similar aircraft with greater capacity, and Heinkel responded with a machine of similar layout, but considerably enlarged. Like the HD 39, it was a conventional single-bay biplane with staggered wings of unequal span, and a fuselage that nearly filled the interplane gap. The pilot sat in an open cockpit, and the undercarriage was of fixed, tailskid type with divided main units. The wings were of wooden construction, while the fuselage was built from welded steel tube skinned in plywood.

In addition to its newspaper-carrying cargo bay, the HD 40 was fitted with another compartment that could be quickly transformed between carrying extra cargo and carrying up to eight reporters or passengers. After only six months' service, the aircraft was destroyed in a crash following the failure of its engine.

== Specifications ==
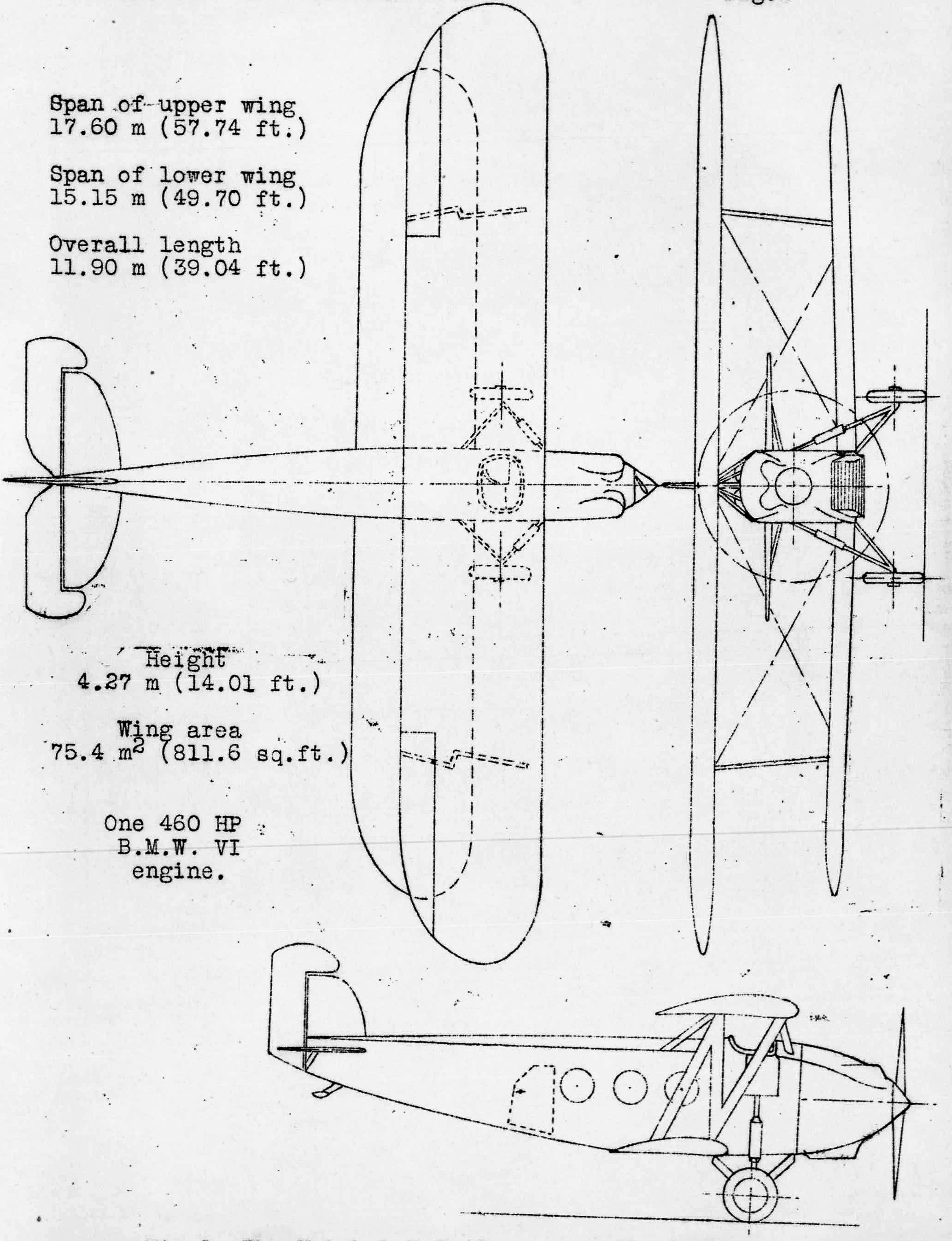
Heinkel HD-40 3-view drawing from NACA Aircraft Circular No.64

General characteristics

- Crew: Two
- Length: 11.90 m (39 ft 1 in)
- Wingspan: 17.60 m (57 ft 9 in)
- Wing area: 75.4 m^{2} (812 sq ft)
- Empty weight: 2,107 kg (4,635 lb)
- Gross weight: 3,707 kg (8,157 lb)
- Powerplant: 1 × BMW VI , 447 kW (600 hp)

Performance

- Maximum speed: 180 km/h (112 mph, 97 kn)
- Rate of climb: 2.1 m/s (410 ft/min)
