= Heinkel HD 36 =

1927 German trainer aircraft

HD 36

General information
- Type: Trainer
- National origin: Germany
- Manufacturer: Heinkel, CFM
- Primary user: Swedish Air Force

History
- First flight: 1927

The Heinkel HD 36 was a trainer developed in Germany in the 1920s at the request of the Swedish Air Force, which was in search of a new trainer aircraft. The newly formed air force had previously evaluated the HD 35, found it to be underpowered, and asked Heinkel to address this problem. Heinkel's response was a development of the HD 35 modified to use the Mercedes D.III engine instead. The HD 36 also dispensed with the third cockpit that had been a feature of the HD 35 and HD 21 before it, but otherwise the design was largely the same. The single example built by Heinkel was tested by the Air Force, and found still not quite satisfactory, was modified by CFM (the Air Force workshops) until the problems had been largely eliminated. Once this had happened, CFM built two batches of 10 aircraft, delivering them in 1928 and 1930 as the Sk 6.

Constant trouble with the engines led to restrictions on longer flights being imposed, and the solution eventually adopted was to replace the engines on all Sk 6s with Armstrong Siddeley Pumas. Aircraft thus modified were redesignated S 6A. Regardless, the type did not remain in service for very long, and all were dismantled after only a few years.

== Operators ==
Sweden

- Swedish Air Force

== Specifications ==
General characteristics

- Crew: Two, pilot and instructor
- Length: 7.50 m (24 ft 7 in)
- Wingspan: 11.00 m (36 ft 1 in)
- Wing area: 30.8 m^{2} (332 sq ft)
- Empty weight: 940 kg (2,070 lb)
- Gross weight: 1,250 kg (2,760 lb)
- Powerplant: 1 × Mercedes D.III , 120 kW (160 hp)

Performance

- Maximum speed: 130 km/h (80 mph, 70 kn)
- Range: 250 km (160 mi, 140 nmi)
- Service ceiling: 5,000 m (16,400 ft)
- Rate of climb: 4.5 m/s (890 ft/min)
