= HD.32 =

HD.32 can mean

- Hanriot HD.32 - French military trainer aircraft of the 1920s
- Hurel-Dubois HD.32 - a variant of the Hurel-Dubois HD.31
- Heinkel HD 32 - German trainer aircraft of the 1920s
