= Heinkel HD 33 =

1920s German aircraft

HD 33
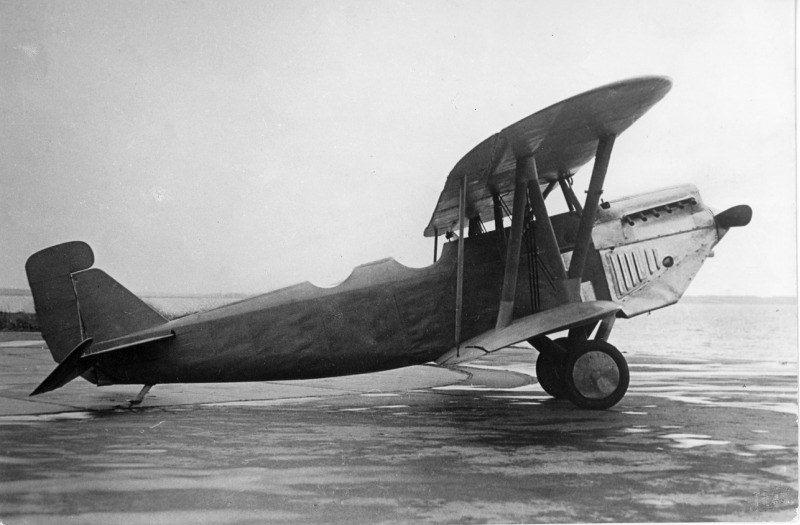

General information
- Type: Scout bomber
- National origin: Germany
- Manufacturer: Heinkel
- Designer: Ernst Heinkel
- Number built: 1

History
- First flight: 1925

The Heinkel HD 33 was a scout bomber developed by Ernst Heinkel Flugzeugwerke.

== Development ==
The HD 33 was a two-seat biplane powered by an Armstrong Siddeley Puma inline engine. It first flew in 1928 but initial flight tests showed disappointing aircraft, so the plane was returned to its manufacturer and fitted with a BMW VI engine as well as a new radiator, thus being redesignated HD 33a. After flight tests in this new configuration, the aircraft was to be transferred to the flight test center in Lipitsk, but the German military abandoned the idea and the HD.33 remained a prototype only. Plans for a civilian version never materialized.

== Specifications (HD 33a) ==
Data from

General characteristics

- Crew: Two
- Length: 11.20 m (36 ft 9 in)
- Wingspan: 15.00 m (49 ft 3 in)
- Height: 4.00 m (13 ft 1 in)
- Empty weight: 2,100 kg (4,630 lb)
- Powerplant: 1 × BMW VI 6-cylinder inline engine, 450 kW (600 hp)
- Propellers: 2-bladed

Performance

- Maximum speed: 230 km/h (140 mph, 120 kn)
- Cruise speed: 195 km/h (121 mph, 105 kn)
