= Heinkel HE 12 =

Floatplane

HE 12 and He 58
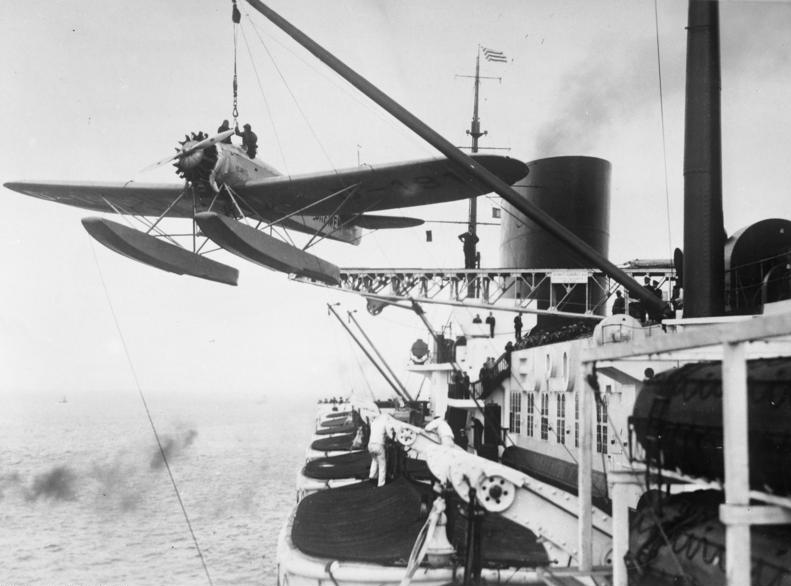
- He 58 D-1919 Bremen Atlantic being loaded onto the catapult on SS Europa

General information
- Type: Mail plane
- National origin: Germany
- Manufacturer: Heinkel
- Primary user: Deutsche Luft Hansa
- Number built: 1x HE 12, 1x He 58

History
- First flight: 1929

The Heinkel HE 12 was a pontoon-equipped mail plane built in Germany in 1929, designed to be launched by catapult from a liner at sea.

== Development ==
The concept was hit upon after Norddeutscher Lloyd (NDL) had carried a Junkers F.13 seaplane aboard the Lutzow during 1927 to provide joyrides for passengers when the liner was in port. NDL officials realised that a seaplane based on a liner could have a more practical commercial application, taking off with the liner's airmail while still a long distance from port, therefore drastically cutting down time taken for the mail to arrive. Heinkel designed a catapult, which NDL planned to install on its new liners, the Bremen and Europa, and an aircraft to carry the mail. Since the crew of Lutzow had trouble providing the necessary maintenance for the F 13, Deutsche Luft Hansa agreed to provide the operational support for the venture, and when Bremen departed on her maiden voyage in 1929, a single HE 12 (D-1717) was carried aboard.

The HE 12 was a derivative of the military HE 9 design; a conventional, low-wing, strut-braced monoplane. The pilot and radio operator sat in tandem, open cockpits with the mail carried in a compartment behind them.

=== He 58 ===
A second aircraft, (D-1919, Atlantik), was built for flying from Europa, sister-ship of the Bremen. Designated He 58, the second aircraft was slightly larger overall, with increased payload and accommodation for the crew in a side-by-side open cockpit. Power was supplied by a 370 kW (500 hp) BMW Hornet A, initially un-cowled, but later fitted with a full long-chord cowling with cooling slits in the forward face.

== Operational history ==
On 22 July, while still 400 km (250 mi) out of New York City, Bremen successfully launched the HE 12. When the seaplane was unloaded 2 1/2 hours later, mail from Berlin had taken just 6 1/2 days to reach New York. The next day, in front of a crowd of 3,500 people, mayor Jimmy Walker christened the HE 12 with the name of the city. On the return journey, the newly christened New York launched from Bremen near Cherbourg on 1 August, landing in Bremerhaven four hours later, in time for the mail to be transferred to another aircraft and arrive in Berlin the same afternoon, 5 1/2 days after leaving New York. Use of the seaplane saved around 20 hours on the westward trip, and 1–2 days on the eastward journey.

HE 12 (D-1717, New York) flew regularly from Bremen until severely damaged in an accident at Cobequid Bay on 5 October 1931.

The He 58, (D-1919, Atlantik), continued in service on Europa until replaced by Junkers Ju 46 floatplanes.

== Variants ==
HE 12
The initial floatplane catapult-launched mailplane, with tandem open cockpits, flown from Bremen.
He 58
A second slightly larger aircraft with side-by-side seats and bigger payload, flown from Europa.

== Specifications (HE 12) ==
Data from Heinkel:An aircraft album

General characteristics

- Crew: Two, pilot and radio operator
- Capacity: 200 kg (440 lb) of mail
- Length: 11.56 m (37 ft 11 in)
- Wingspan: 16.7958 m (55 ft 1.25 in)
- Height: 4.60 m (15 ft 1 in)
- Wing area: 48.5 m^{2} (522 sq ft)
- Empty weight: 1,580 kg (3,483 lb)
- Gross weight: 2,600 kg (5,732 lb)
- Powerplant: 1 × Pratt & Whitney Hornet 9-cyl. air-cooled radial piston engine, 370 kW (500 hp)

Performance

- Maximum speed: 216 km/h (134 mph, 116 kn)
- Cruise speed: 192 km/h (119 mph, 103 kn)
- Service ceiling: 3,800 m (12,500 ft)

== See also ==
Aircraft of comparable role, configuration, and era

- Junkers Ju 46

== Bibliography ==
- Turner, P.St. John (1970). Heinkel:An aircraft album. Shepperton: Ian Allan. pp. 27–30. ISBN 07110-01731.
- Taylor, Michael J. H. (1989). Jane's Encyclopedia of Aviation. London: Studio Editions. p. 498.
- Cook, John C. (March 2002). "Shot from Ships: Part One". Air Classics.
