= Heinkel HD 44 =

1920s German aircraft

HD 44

General information
- Type: Newspaper delivery aircraft
- National origin: Germany
- Manufacturer: Heinkel
- Primary user: Deutsche Versuchsanstalt für Luftfahrt
- Number built: 1

History
- First flight: 1929

The Heinkel HD 44 was a special-purpose light transport aircraft developed in Germany in the 1920s.

== Design and development ==
The Heinkel HD 44 was similar in layout to the Heinkel HD 40, but differed in the design of the tail assembly. The crew were situated in an open cabin with twin controls, while the passengers were in a closed cabin.

The HD 44 first flew in 1929, but the idea of a transport plane was abandoned by the DVL and the aircraft relegated to being an engine-testbed.

== Specifications (HD 44) ==
Data from

General characteristics

- Crew: 2
- Capacity: 6 pax
- Length: 12.2 m (40 ft 0 in)
- Wingspan: 17.6 m (57 ft 9 in)
- Height: 4.6 m (15 ft 1 in)
- Wing area: 75.5 m^{2} (813 sq ft)
- Empty weight: 2,050 kg (4,519 lb)
- Gross weight: 3,620 kg (7,981 lb)
- Powerplant: 1 × BMW VI 5.5 V-12 water-cooled piston engine, 480 kW (650 hp)

Performance

- Maximum speed: 206 km/h (128 mph, 111 kn)
- Cruise speed: 180 km/h (110 mph, 97 kn)
- Range: 1,040 km (650 mi, 560 nmi)
- Service ceiling: 5,000 m (16,000 ft)
