= Heinkel He 57 =

Heinkel HE 57 Heron
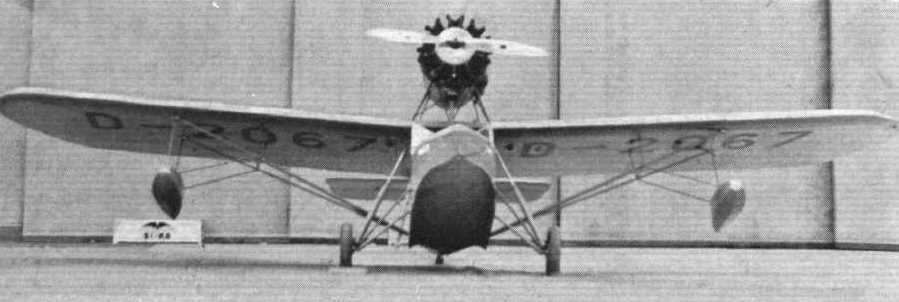
- Front view of Heinkel HE 57 at Stockholm International Aero Show 1931

General information
- Type: Amphibious flying boat
- National origin: Germany
- Manufacturer: Heinkel
- Designer: Dr Ernst Heinkel
- Number built: 1

History
- Introduction date: 1930 Paris Aero Show
- First flight: 1929-30

The Heinkel HE 57 was a single engine amphibious flying boat built in 1929.

== Development ==
The sole HE 57 was built by the Ernst-Heinkel-Flugzeugwerken at Warnemunde in 1929. It was displayed at the Paris Aero Show in December 1930 and at the Stockholm International Aero Show in May 1931. It was purchased by the flying school at List auf Sylt who used it as a trainer.

== Design ==
The double stepped hull was made of aluminum. The wings used wood spars and aluminum ribs with fabric covering. The landing gear was hydraulically raised with a manual pump.

== Specifications Heinkel HE 57 ==
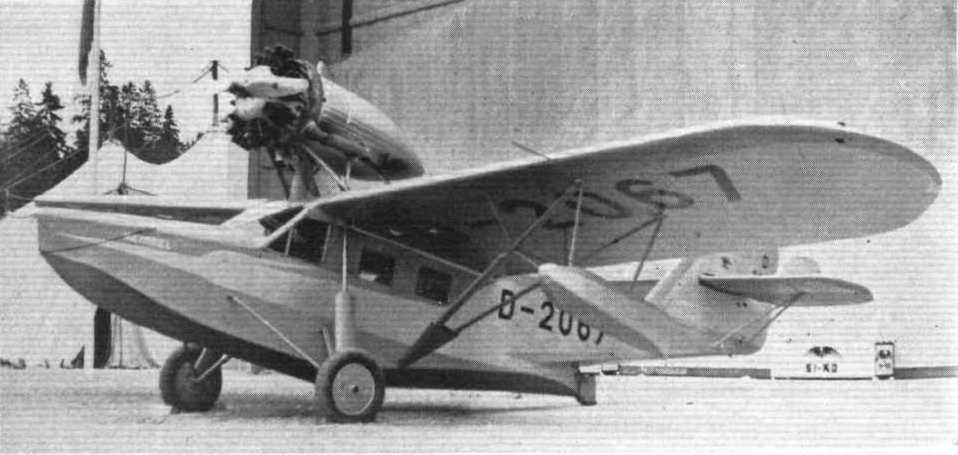
HE 57

Data from Flight unless noted

General characteristics

- Capacity: 6
- Length: 11.8 m (38 ft 9 in)
- Wingspan: 16.00 m (52 ft 6 in)
- Wing area: 39.2 m^{2} (422 sq ft)
- Gross weight: 2,440 kg (5,380 lb)
- Powerplant: 1 × Pratt and Whitney Wasp Radial, 340 kW (450 hp)
- Propellers: 2-bladed

Performance

- Maximum speed: 195 km/h (121 mph, 105 kn)
- Service ceiling: 3,800 m (12,500 ft)
- Time to altitude: 5 min to 1,000 m (3,300 ft)
- Wing loading: 62.3 kg/m^{2} (12.75 lb/sq ft)
- Landing speed: 93 km/h (58 mph; 50 kn)
