= Heinkel Wespe =

- The Heinkel Wespe

General information
- Type: VTOL interceptor aircraft
- National origin: Germany
- Manufacturer: Heinkel Flugzeugwerke

The Heinkel Wespe (English: Wasp) was a project study by the German company Heinkel for a tail-sitting, vertical take off and landing-interceptor aircraft. The aircraft did not have conventional wings, but instead featured a large rotor. Completed in 1945, it remained untested due to a lack of material at the end of the Second World War. A related project was the Heinkel Lerche.

== Design ==
The aircraft was to be powered by a turboprop in the center of the airframe which was unusual for having a circular wing and would have had a small frontal area, making it a good platform for attacking bombers. It may have been designed for point defense, but due to the situation in Germany at the time, the engine was not completed and none were ever built.

== Specifications ==
Data from

General characteristics

- Crew: 1
- Length: 6.2 m (20 ft 4 in)
- Wingspan: 6.3 m (20 ft 8 in)
- Height: 2.03 m (6 ft 8 in)
- Max takeoff weight: 2,200 kg (4,850 lb)
- Powerplant: 1 × He S 021 turboprop, 1,500 kW (2,000 hp)

Performance

- Maximum speed: 800 km/h (500 mph, 430 kn)
- Range: 650 km (400 mi, 350 nmi)

Armament

- Guns: 2×30mm (1.18 in) MK 108 cannons

== See also ==
- Heinkel Lerche
- Focke-Wulf Triebflugel
- Lockheed XFV
- Convair XFY Pogo
