= Heinkel HD 28 =

Reconnaissance seaplane

HD 28
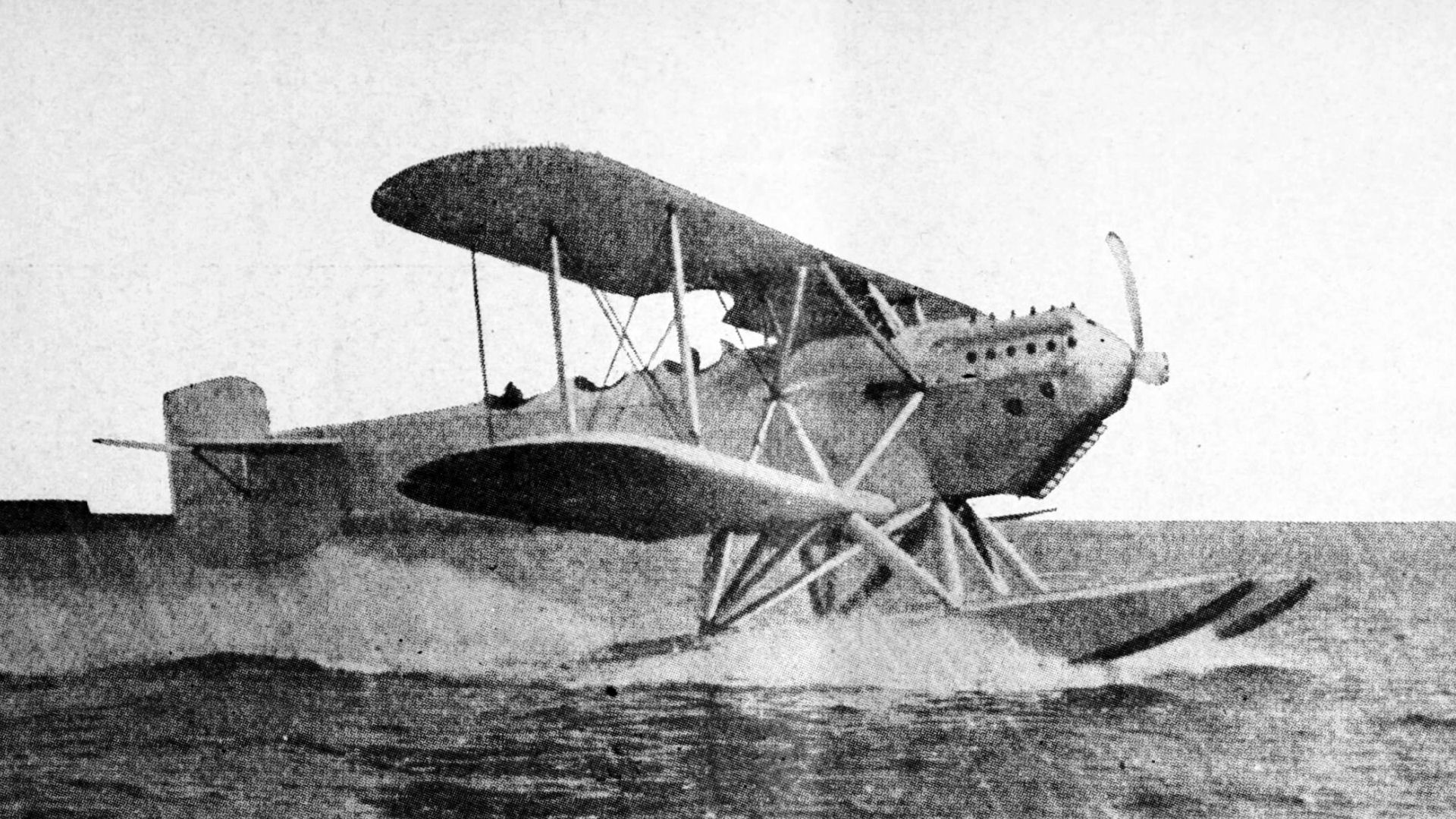

General information
- Type: Reconnaissance seaplane
- National origin: Germany
- Manufacturer: Heinkel
- Number built: 1

History
- First flight: 1926

The Heinkel HD 28 was a reconnaissance seaplane developed in Germany in the 1920s for export to Japan. It was a conventional single-bay biplane with equal-span, unstaggered wings and three cockpits in tandem. The fuselage was braced to both the upper and lower wings with a number of struts on its sides, in addition to the normal cabane struts. The rudder extended below the line of the lower fuselage, and there was a large ventral fin fitted. The rearmost cockpit incorporated a ring mount for a gunner.

A single example built by Heinkel and supplied to Aichi as a pattern aircraft, given the designation Aichi Experimental Three-seat Reconnaissance Seaplane, for possible production in Japan, but was rejected due to problems with the engine and also failure to meet performance and weight reduction targets.

== Specifications ==
General characteristics

- Crew: Three
- Length: 11.00 m (36 ft 1 in)
- Wingspan: 15.00 m (49 ft 3 in)
- Height: 4.52 m (14 ft 10 in)
- Wing area: 59.5 m^{2} (640 sq ft)
- Empty weight: 2,365 kg (5,215 lb)
- Gross weight: 3,850 kg (8,490 lb)
- Powerplant: 1 × Lorraine Dietrich 18K , 485 kW (650 hp)

Performance

- Maximum speed: 198 km/h (124 mph, 108 kn)
- Range: 1,250 km (780 mi, 680 nmi)
- Service ceiling: 4,500 m (14,800 ft)
