= Heinkel HD 41 =

1920s German aircraft

HD 41
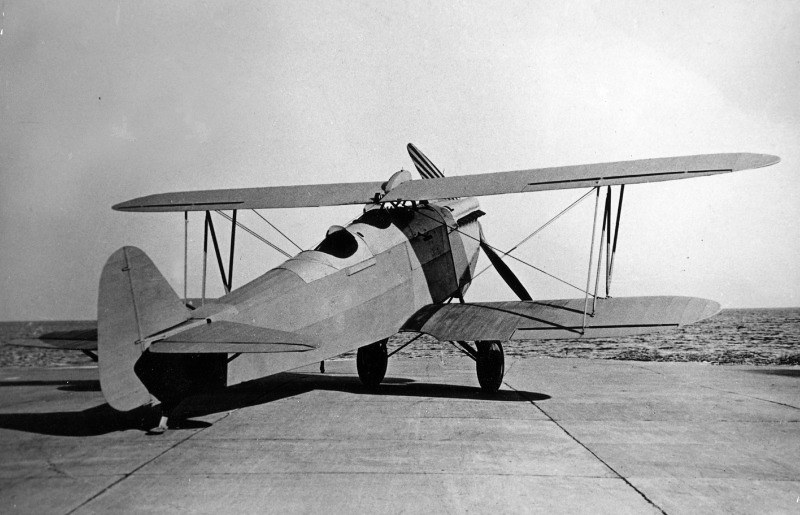

General information
- Type: Reconnaissance aircraft
- National origin: Germany
- Manufacturer: Heinkel
- Number built: 3

History
- First flight: 1929

The Heinkel HD 41 was a reconnaissance aircraft developed in Germany in the 1920s.

== Design and development ==
The HD 41a, equipped with a Siemens Jupiter VI of 520 hp (390 kW), paid particular attention to the flight characteristics of the aircraft, so as to add, if necessary, the machine guns to transform the apparatus into a fighter.

== Variants ==
Data from:1000aircraftphotos : Heinkel H.D.41a

HD 41a
The initial designation of the first prototype, powered by a 520 hp (390 kW) Siemens Jupiter VI; one built.
HD 41b
Powered by a 520 hp (390 kW) BMW VI; one built.
HD 41c
Powered by a 520 hp (390 kW) BMW VI 7.3Zu; two built. The first aircraft, (c/n 363, D-1011), was converted to be the first pre-production Heinkel He 45A and the second HD 41c, (c/n 364, D-2064), was converted to be the prototype Heinkel He 45 with a new registration (D-ILEU)

== Specifications (HD.41a) ==
Data from

General characteristics

- Crew: 2
- Length: 9.81 m (32 ft 2 in)
- Wingspan: 11.5 m (37 ft 9 in)
- Wing area: 34.57 m^{2} (372.1 sq ft)
- Empty weight: 1,700 kg (3,748 lb)
- Gross weight: 2,435 kg (5,368 lb)
- Powerplant: 1 × Siemens Jupiter VI 9-cylinder air-cooled radial piston engine, 400 kW (530 hp)

Performance

- Maximum speed: 232 km/h (144 mph, 125 kn)
- Range: 950 km (590 mi, 510 nmi)
- Service ceiling: 5,000 m (16,000 ft)
