= Heinkel He 63 =

Type of aircraft

He 63

General information
- Type: Trainer
- National origin: Germany
- Manufacturer: Heinkel
- Number built: 2 prototypes

History
- First flight: 1932

The Heinkel He 63 was a trainer biplane built in Germany in the early 1930s. It was a largely conventional design with single-bay wings, fixed tailskid undercarriage, and two open cockpits in tandem. An unusual feature of the design was the highly swept, arrow-shaped upper wing, braced to the lower wing by N-type struts. Prototypes of the He 63 were built in both landplane and seaplane form, but no production ensued.

== Specifications (Landplane) ==
General characteristics

- Crew: Two, pilot and instructor
- Length: 8.20 m (26 ft 11 in)
- Wingspan: 10.80 m (35 ft 5 in)
- Height: 2.70 m (8 ft 10 in)
- Wing area: 24.4 m^{2} (263 sq ft)
- Empty weight: 820 kg (1,800 lb)
- Gross weight: 1,250 kg (2,750 lb)
- Powerplant: 1 × Argus As 10C , 120 kW (160 hp)

Performance

- Maximum speed: 200 km/h (125 mph, 109 kn)
- Range: 1,100 km (684 mi, 594 nmi)
- Service ceiling: 3,900 m (12,800 ft)
