= Heinkel HD 35 =

Type of aircraft

HD 35
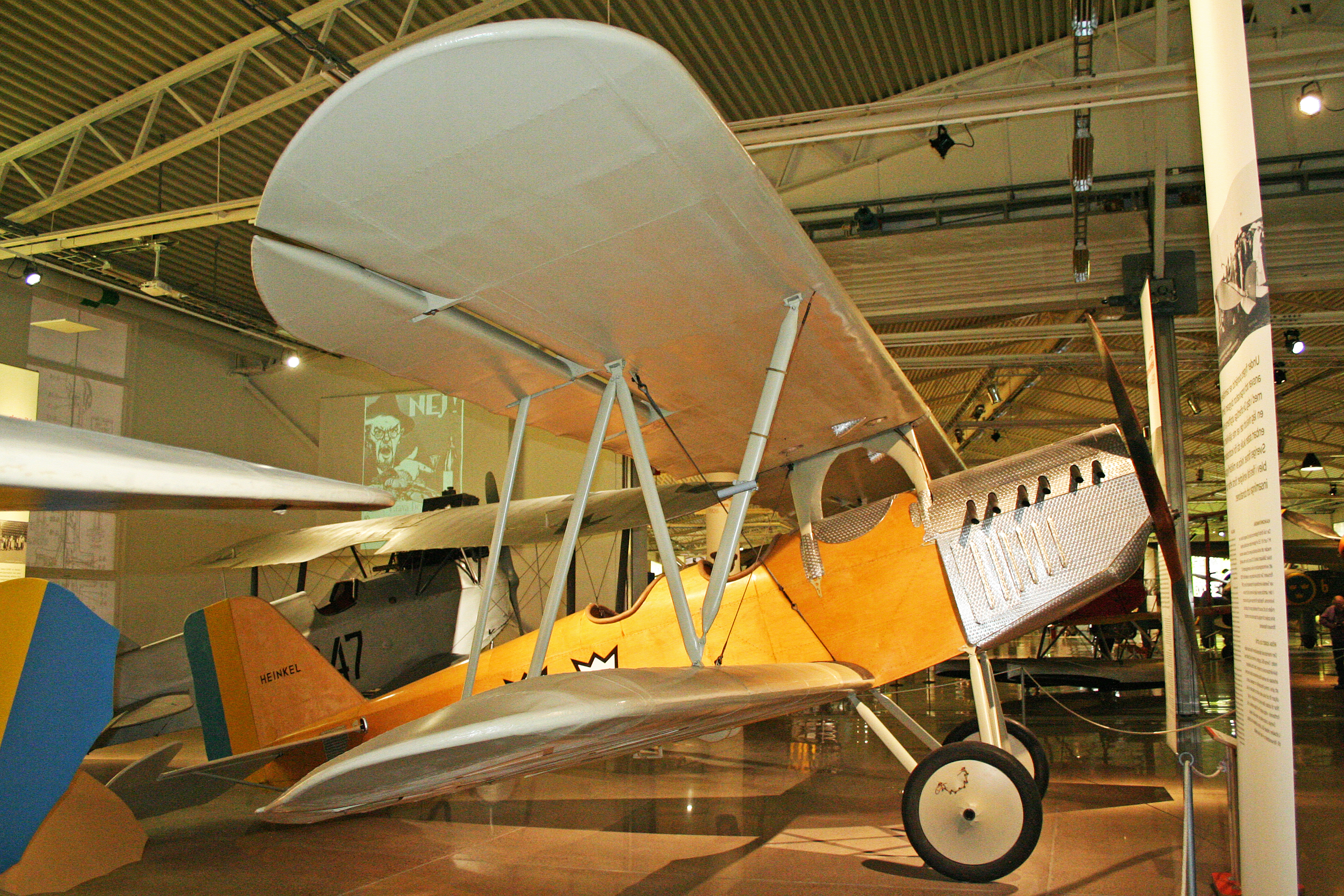

General information
- Type: Trainer
- National origin: Germany
- Manufacturer: Heinkel

History
- First flight: 1926

The Heinkel HD 35 was a trainer developed in Germany in the 1920s. It was a conventional single-bay biplane with staggered wings of equal span. The design was based on that of the HD 21, and like that aircraft, it had three open cockpits in tandem, although the most forward of these was usually faired over when not in use.

The Swedish Air Force bought an aircraft to evaluate as a replacement for the World War I-vintage Albatros B.IIs it was then using for training. This aircraft was designated Sk 5 and was flight tested until March 1927, at which time it was judged inadequate in performance. It was subsequently sold onto the civil market and was eventually acquired by the Flygvapenmuseum, where it is preserved. The Heinkel HD 35 is comparable to Curtiss JN-4 Jenny in general specifications.

== Operators ==
Sweden

- Swedish Air Force

== Specifications ==
General characteristics

- Crew: Two, pilot and instructor
- Length: 7.40 m (24 ft 3 in)
- Wingspan: 10.97 m (36 ft 0 in)
- Height: 3.10 m (10 ft 2 in)
- Wing area: 32.5 m^{2} (349 sq ft)
- Empty weight: 760 kg (1,675 lb)
- Gross weight: 1,060 kg (2,340 lb)
- Powerplant: 1 × Mercedes D.II , 90 kW (120 hp)

Performance

- Maximum speed: 138 km/h (86 mph, 75 kn)
- Range: 250 km (160 mi, 140 nmi)
- Service ceiling: 3,300 m (10,800 ft)
- Rate of climb: 1.8 m/s (350 ft/min)

== See also ==
Aircraft of comparable role, configuration, and era

- Curtiss JN-4 Jenny
