= Heinkel HD 43 =

1930s prototype German fighter aircraft

HD-43

General information
- Type: Fighter aircraft
- National origin: Germany
- Manufacturer: Heinkel
- Status: Prototype
- Number built: 1

History
- First flight: 1931

The Heinkel Doppeldecker 43 was a prototype German fighter aircraft of the 1930s. A single-engined, single-seat biplane, the HD 43 was designed to meet a secret German Reichswehr requirement for a single-seat fighter. It had two-bay wooden wings with a steel-tube fuselage, and was powered by a 750 hp (600 kW) BMW VI engine. The single prototype flew in 1931.

It was evaluated against the Arado Ar 65, with the Arado being selected and no production of the Heinkel followed.

== Specifications ==
Data from The Complete Book of Fighters

General characteristics

- Crew: 1
- Length: 7.1 m (23 ft 4 in)
- Wingspan: 10 m (32 ft 10 in)
- Height: 3.3 m (10 ft 10 in)
- Wing area: 26.56 m^{2} (285.9 sq ft)
- Empty weight: 1,280 kg (2,822 lb)
- Gross weight: 1,700 kg (3,748 lb)
- Powerplant: 1 × BMW VI 7.3 Z V-12 liquid-cooled piston engine, 559 kW (750 hp)
- Propellers: 2-bladed fixed-pitch propeller

Performance

- Maximum speed: 322 km/h (200 mph, 174 kn)
- Time to altitude: 3,000 m (9,800 ft) in 4 minutes 54 seconds

Armament

- Guns: provision for two machine guns
