= Heinkel HE 10 =

HE 10

General information
- Type: Trainer seaplane
- National origin: Germany
- Designer: Ernst Heinkel
- Number built: 2

History
- First flight: 1928

The Heinkel HE 10 was a trainer floatplane developed by the German aeronautical company Heinkel Flugzeugwerke in the late 1920s.

== Development ==
The Heinkel HE 10 was a monoplane trainer seaplane based on the HE 6.

On September 4, 1929, an HE 10 flying near Warnemünde could not reduce its speed and crashed into the dam. The two pilots were seriously injured while the three passengers managed to land alone.

== Specifications ==
Data from

General characteristics

- Crew: 5
- Length: 13.1 m (43 ft 0 in)
- Wingspan: 18.20 m (59 ft 9 in)
- Height: 4.658 m (15 ft 3 in)
- Wing area: 60.9 m^{2} (656 sq ft)
- Empty weight: 2,540 kg (5,600 lb)
- Gross weight: 4,800 kg (10,582 lb)
- Powerplant: 1 × BMW VI V-12 water-cooled piston engine, 560 kW (750 hp)
- Propellers: 2-bladed

Performance

- Maximum speed: 246 km/h (153 mph, 133 kn)
- Range: 3,000 km (1,900 mi, 1,600 nmi)
- Service ceiling: 4,000 m (13,000 ft)
