= Heinkel HE 7 =

1920s German aircraft

HE 7
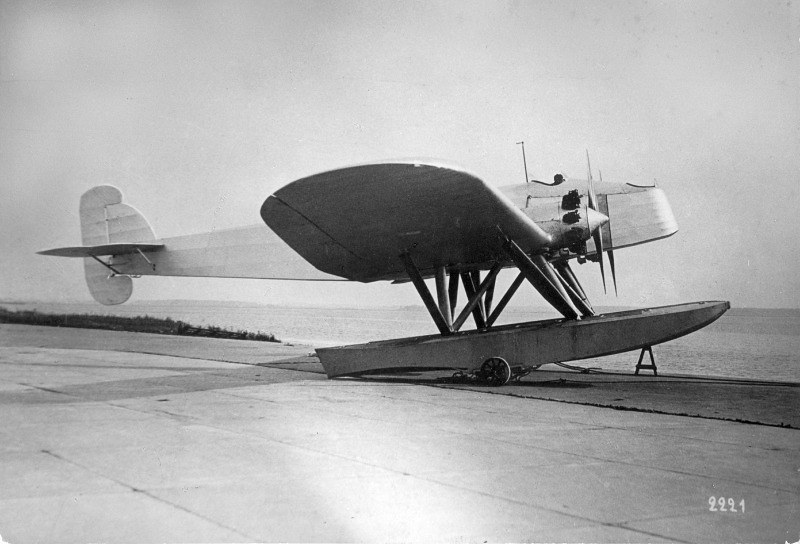

General information
- Type: Reconnaissance/torpedo bomber
- National origin: Germany
- Designer: Ernst Heinkel
- Number built: 1

History
- First flight: 1927

The Heinkel HE 7 was a reconnaissance torpedo-bomber developed by the German aeronautical company Heinkel Flugzeugwerke in the late 1920s.

== Design ==
The HE 7 was a low-wing monoplane with floats for sea operations. Because of restrictions imposed by the Versailles Treaty the aircraft did not enter production.

== Specifications ==
Data from

General characteristics

- Crew: 2-3
- Length: 16 m (52 ft 6 in)
- Wingspan: 24 m (78 ft 9 in)
- Height: 4.25 m (13 ft 11 in)
- Wing area: 93.42 m^{2} (1,005.6 sq ft)
- Empty weight: 3,800 kg (8,378 lb)
- Gross weight: 6,000 kg (13,228 lb)
- Powerplant: 2 × Siemens Jupiter VI radial engines, 390 kW (520 hp) each
- Propellers: 2-bladed

Performance

- Maximum speed: 200 km/h (120 mph, 110 kn)
- Cruise speed: 175 km/h (109 mph, 94 kn)
- Stall speed: 90 km/h (56 mph, 49 kn)
- Range: 950 km (590 mi, 510 nmi)
- Service ceiling: 2,300 m (7,500 ft)
- Rate of climb: 2.80 m/s (551 ft/min)
