= Heinkel HD 34 =

1920s German aircraft

HD 34
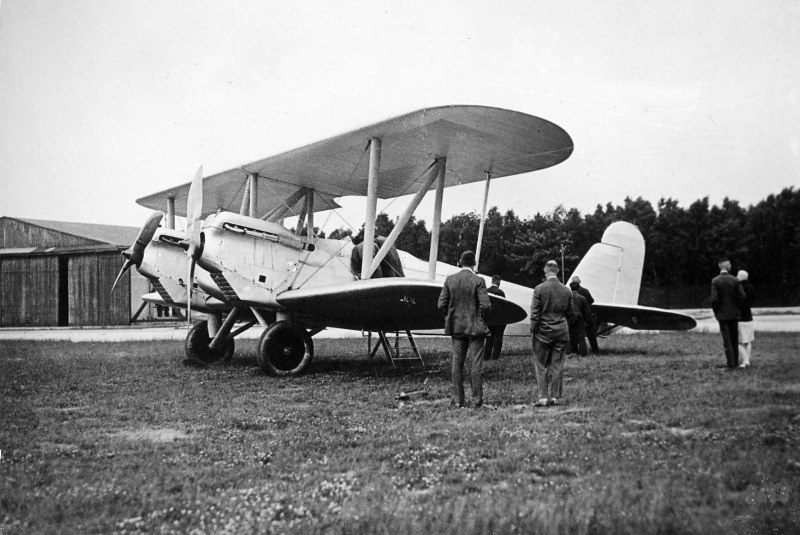

General information
- Type: Reconnaissance bomber
- National origin: Germany
- Manufacturer: Heinkel
- Number built: 1

History
- First flight: 1928

The Heinkel HD 34 was a reconnaissance bomber built in Germany in the late 1920s.

== Design and development ==
The HD 34 was a twin-engine biplane designed for long-range reconnaissance. The center section had a front cockpit with side-by-side seating, with the third crewmember in the rear cockpit.

On June 26, 1928, the HD.34 suffered damage on a test flight after losing control. It was decided, however, not to repair the aircraft due to high costs of repair.

== Specifications ==
Data from

General characteristics

- Crew: 2-3
- Length: 11.73 m (38 ft 6 in)
- Wingspan: 18.00 m (59 ft 1 in)
- Height: 4.84 m (15 ft 11 in)
- Wing area: 85.40 m^{2} (919.2 sq ft)
- Empty weight: 3,000 kg (6,614 lb)
- Gross weight: 4,500 kg (9,921 lb)
- Powerplant: 2 × BMW VI V-12 water-cooled piston engines, 560 kW (750 hp) each
- Propellers: 2-bladed fixed-pitch metal propeller

Performance

- Maximum speed: 266 km/h (165 mph, 144 kn)
- Cruise speed: 220 km/h (140 mph, 120 kn)
- Service ceiling: 7,600 m (24,900 ft)

Armament

- Guns: (planned) 2 × fixed, forward-firing 7.7 mm (0.303 in) machine guns
- Bombs: (planned) light bombs
