= Heinkel HD 32 =

HD 32
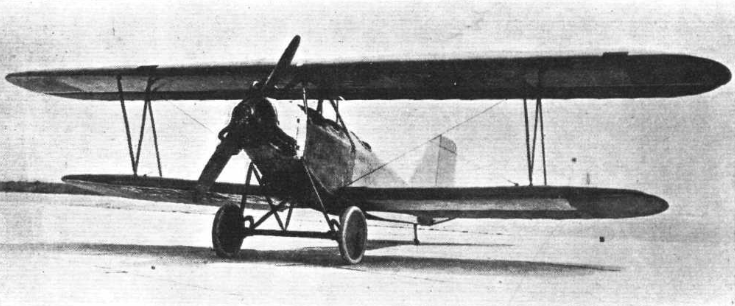
- Heinkel HD.32 at the 1925 Round Germany Contest

General information
- Type: Trainer
- National origin: Germany
- Manufacturer: Heinkel

History
- First flight: 1926

The Heinkel HD 32 was a trainer developed in Germany in the 1920s, a derivative of the HD 21. Like that aircraft, it was a conventional, single-bay biplane, but had only two cockpits rather than the three that the HD 21 had. The other significant change was the use of a Siemens radial engine in place of the inline units that powered most of the HD 21 family.

A number of HD 32s participated in the 1925 Deutscher Rundflug, including one powered by a Bristol Lucifer engine.

== Specifications (variant) ==
General characteristics

- Crew: Two, pilot and instructor
- Length: 6.80 m (22 ft 4 in)
- Wingspan: 10.50 m (34 ft 5 in)
- Height: 3.02 m (9 ft 11 in)
- Wing area: 24.3 m^{2} (262 sq ft)
- Empty weight: 520 kg (1,150 lb)
- Gross weight: 900 kg (1,980 lb)
- Powerplant: 1 × Siemens-Halske Sh 12 , 93 kW (125 hp)

Performance

- Maximum speed: 140 km/h (88 mph, 76 kn)
- Range: 600 km (375 mi, 326 nmi)
- Service ceiling: 3,800 m (12,500 ft)
- Rate of climb: 2.2 m/s (430 ft/min)
