= Heinkel HE 18 =

HE 18

General information
- Type: Sports plane
- National origin: Germany
- Manufacturer: Heinkel

History
- First flight: 1925

The Heinkel HE 18 was a sports aircraft built in Germany in the mid 1920s. It was a two-seat conventional low-wing monoplane. A development of the HE 3, it had a narrower fuselage than the HE3, having tandem seating instead of side-by-side. Also, its wings were braced by a pair of struts on each side, arranged in a V-shape with a single attachment point on each side of the upper fuselage, where the HE 3 had cantilever wings. The wings could be folded flat along the sides of the fuselage for transport or storage, and a choice of wheeled or float undercarriage was available. A roll-bar was available that could be fitted in order to protect the occupants in case of a roll-over on the ground.

== Specifications (HE 18) ==
General characteristics

- Crew: One pilot
- Capacity: 1 passenger
- Length: 7.20 m (23 ft 7 in)
- Wingspan: 11.10 m (36 ft 5 in)
- Wing area: 17.5 m^{2} (188 sq ft)
- Empty weight: 380 kg (836 lb)
- Gross weight: 600 kg (1,320 lb)
- Powerplant: 1 × Siemens , 57 kW (75 hp)

Performance

- Maximum speed: 150 km/h (94 mph, 82 kn)
- Rate of climb: 2.8 m/s (550 ft/min)
