= Heinkel HE 9 =

HE 9
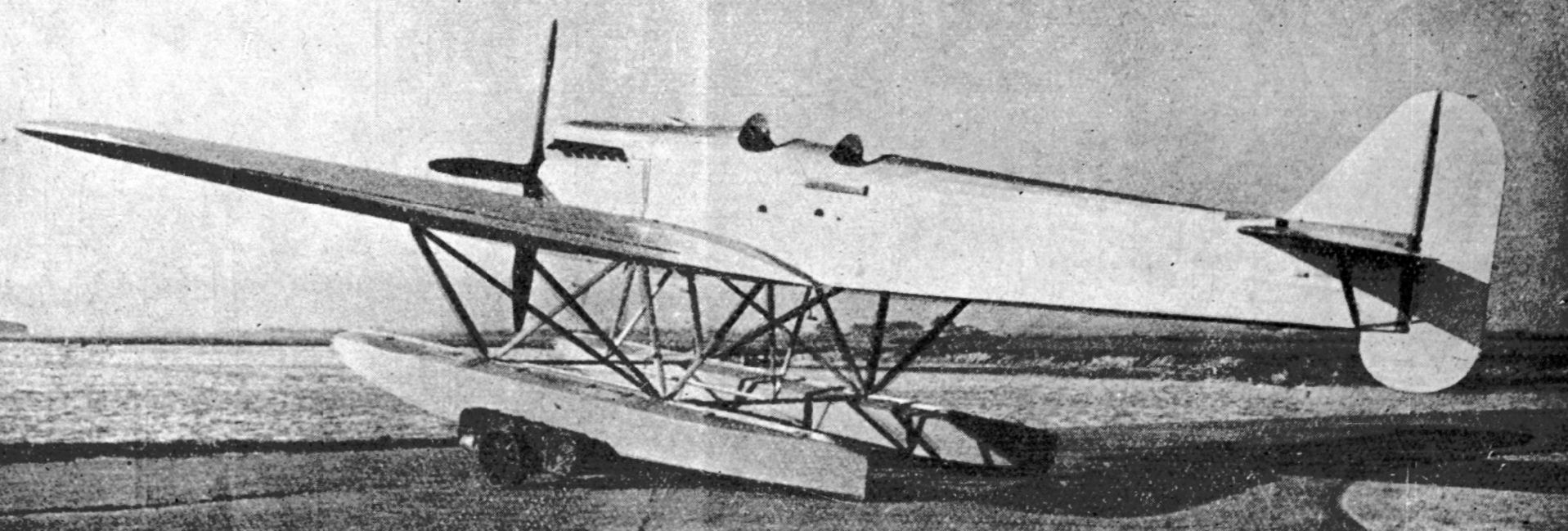

General information
- Type: Reconnaissance floatplane
- National origin: Germany
- Manufacturer: Heinkel
- Number built: 1

History
- First flight: 1927

The Heinkel HE 9 was a reconnaissance seaplane developed by the German aviation company Ernst Heinkel Flugzeugwerke AG in the late 1920s.

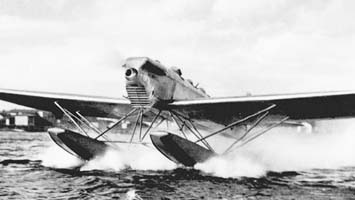
on take-off

The aircraft was equipped with 660 liters (492 kW) BMW VI . The planned crew consisted of three people. On 21 May 1929 the plane established numerous world record for seaplanes including a speed record of 231 kilometers per hour in one km of track with a load of 1000 kg. On 10 June HE 9 set a speed record for 1000 km of track with a load of 1000 kg.

== Specifications ==
Data from

General characteristics

- Crew: 3
- Length: 11.6 m (38 ft 1 in)
- Wingspan: 16.8 m (55 ft 1 in)
- Height: 4.56 m (15 ft 0 in)
- Wing area: 47.5 m^{2} (511 sq ft)
- Empty weight: 2,379 kg (5,245 lb)
- Max takeoff weight: 3,000 kg (6,614 lb)
- Fuel capacity: 500 kg
- Powerplant: 1 × BMW VI V-12 water-cooled piston engine, 560 kW (750 hp)
- Propellers: 2-bladed fixed-pitch metal propeller

Performance

- Maximum speed: 250 km/h (160 mph, 130 kn)
- Range: 850 km (530 mi, 460 nmi)
- Service ceiling: 5,900 m (19,400 ft)
- Rate of climb: 2.8 m/s (550 ft/min)
- Time to altitude: 1,000 m (3,300 ft) in 2 minutes 50 seconds: 5,000 m (16,000 ft) in 25 minutes'
- Wing loading: 63 kg/m^{2} (13 lb/sq ft)
