= Heinkel HD 27 =

1920s German aircraft

HD 27

General information
- Type: Mail delivery aircraft
- National origin: Germany
- Manufacturer: Heinkel
- Number built: 1

History
- First flight: 1925

The Heinkel HD 27 was a mail-carrying transport built in Germany in the 1920s.

== Operational history ==
The HD 27 flew in 1925 and carried mail until 1928, when it was destroyed in a tornado. No more airframes were built, but the HD 27 formed the basis for the HD 39.

== Specifications ==
Data from

General characteristics

- Crew: one
- Capacity: two mail compartments
- Length: 8.80 m (28 ft 10 in)
- Wingspan: 12.40 m (40 ft 8 in)
- Powerplant: 1 × Liberty L-12 V-12 water-cooled in-line piston engine, 300 kW (400 hp)
- Propellers: 2-bladed fixed pitch propeller

Performance

- Maximum speed: 178 km/h (111 mph, 96 kn)
- Cruise speed: 155 km/h (96 mph, 84 kn)
