= Heinkel HD 19 =

1920s German-Swedish aircraft

HD 19

General information
- Type: Seaplane fighter
- National origin: German-Swedish
- Manufacturer: Svenska Aero AB
- Designer: Ernst Heinkel
- Primary user: Svenska Flygvapnet
- Number built: 6

History
- Introduction date: 1928
- First flight: July 1928
- Retired: 1937

The Heinkel HD 19 W (or Svenska Aero J 4) was a biplane seaplane fighter developed by Ernst Heinkel Flugzeugwerke .

== Development ==
The Heinkel HD 19 W was the only naval fighter to be delivered to the Svenska Flygvapnet. Formed in 1926, the Svenska Flygvapnet issued a requirement in 1927 for an aircraft to be used for the defense of coastal fortifications and ships of the Navy. The specification determined the engine (the Bristol Jupiter VI) and the configuration of the aircraft, which should have been a seaplane with boots. The aircraft was designated J 4 (the acronym J stands for the Swedish word "Jakt", fighter) and two aircraft were ordered by Heinkel in September 1927.

Meanwhile, the Swedish branch of Heinkel, the Svenska Aero AB based in Lidingö (an island in the Stockholm archipelago), made an offer for the Swedish air force and in October 1928 an order was made for four additional aircraft (serial numbers 282-285). The first delivery took place in May 1929, the last one in the following September.

The aircraft housed 2 people and was armed with two KSP M / 22 caliber 8 mm front fixed machine guns and another 8 mm KSP M / 22 caliber that can be tilted by the rear seat passenger. The first HD 19 carried out the tests at Warnemünde in July 1928 and entered service at Wing F 2 in Hagernäs a few months later. Given the limited performance the days for seaplanes were set, so the planes were actually used for the reconnaissance and fire management. In particular, the floats limited a lot of operation and performance even if the HD 19 was initially designed with an alternative landing gear that could mount wheels or skis depending on the case. In 1934 the three surviving J4s were transferred to Wing F 1 in Västerås and placed in reserve. The last J 4 (number 281) was withdrawn on August 31, 1937 after an operating life of 812 flight hours.

== Specifications ==
Data from

General characteristics

- Crew: Two
- Length: 9.26 m (30 ft 5 in)
- Wingspan: 11 m (36 ft 1 in)
- Height: 3.91 m (12 ft 10 in)
- Wing area: 31.60 m^{2} (340.1 sq ft)
- Empty weight: 1,175 kg (2,590 lb)
- Powerplant: 1 × Bristol Jupiter VI , 310 kW (420 hp)
- Propellers: 2-bladed

Performance

- Maximum speed: 215 km/h (134 mph, 116 kn)
- Cruise speed: 182 km/h (113 mph, 98 kn)
- Service ceiling: 6,400 m (21,000 ft)
- Wing loading: 47 kg/m^{2} (9.6 lb/sq ft)
