= Heinkel HD 21 =

HD 21 and HD 29

General information
- Type: Civil trainer
- National origin: Germany
- Manufacturer: Heinkel

History
- First flight: 1924

The Heinkel HD 21 was a trainer built in Germany during the 1920s. It was a conventional single-bay biplane with staggered wings braced with N-type interplane struts. The main units of the fixed, tailskid undercarriage were linked by a cross-axle, and the aircraft had three open cockpits in tandem, although one of these was typically faired over. The HD 29 of 1925 was essentially similar, but was purely a two-seater.

One HD 21 (registered SE-ACY) was flown as an air ambulance by Carl Gustaf von Rosen for the Red Cross during the Italian invasion of Abyssinia in 1935. Others were flown by the Reichswehr at the clandestine aviation training facility in Lipetsk.

== Specifications ==
General characteristics

- Crew: Two, pilot and instructor
- Length: 7.25 m (23 ft 9 in)
- Wingspan: 10.60 m (34 ft 9 in)
- Height: 3.05 m (10 ft 0 in)
- Wing area: 27.8 m^{2} (299 sq ft)
- Empty weight: 680 kg (1,500 lb)
- Gross weight: 980 kg (2,160 lb)
- Powerplant: 1 × Mercedes D.I , 75 kW (100 hp)

Performance

- Maximum speed: 135 km/h (103 mph, 90 kn)
- Rate of climb: 2.7 m/s (530 ft/min)

Armament

- 1 × .22 LR caliber built in machine pistol
- 2 × 100 .22 LR caliber links
