= Ernst Heinkel =

Aircraft designer and manufacturer (1888–1958)

Dr. Ernst Heinkel
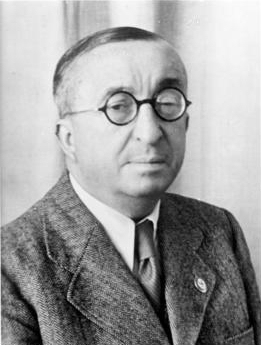
- Born: 24 January 1888; Grunbach, Kingdom of Württemberg, German Empire
- Died: 30 January 1958 (aged 70); Stuttgart, West Germany
- Occupation(s): German aircraft designer and manufacturer
- Awards: German National Prize for Art and Science (1938)

Dr. Ernst Heinkel (24 January 1888 – 30 January 1958) was a German aircraft designer, manufacturer, Wehrwirtschaftsführer in Nazi Germany, and member of the Nazi Party. His company Heinkel Flugzeugwerke produced the Heinkel He 178, the world's first turbojet-powered aircraft, and the Heinkel He 176, the first rocket aircraft.

== Early life ==
Heinkel was born in Grunbach, today a part of Remshalden. As a young man he became an apprentice machinist at a foundry. Heinkel studied at the Technical Academy of Stuttgart, where he initially became interested in aviation through a fascination with Zeppelins, and in 1909 attended an international airshow in Frankfurt am Main. He decided that flight was the future of transportation, and the following year he built his first aircraft, working from a set of plans by Henri Farman. Heinkel crashed it in 1911 and suffered severe injuries.

== Albatros Flugzeugwerke ==
Soon afterwards, he got a job at Luft-Verkehrs Gesellschaft (LVG), who were building Farman aircraft. From there, he went to Albatros. After the war Heinkel claimed to have designed the Albatros B.II, a successful reconnaissance and trainer aircraft used during the early stages of the First World War, but its main designer was in fact Robert Thelen. His aircraft were used by the Austro-Hungarian army and Germany's Kaiserliche Marine during the war. After leaving Albatros, Heinkel designed several land- and seaplanes for the Hansa-Brandenburg company starting in 1914.

== Heinkel-Flugzeugwerke ==
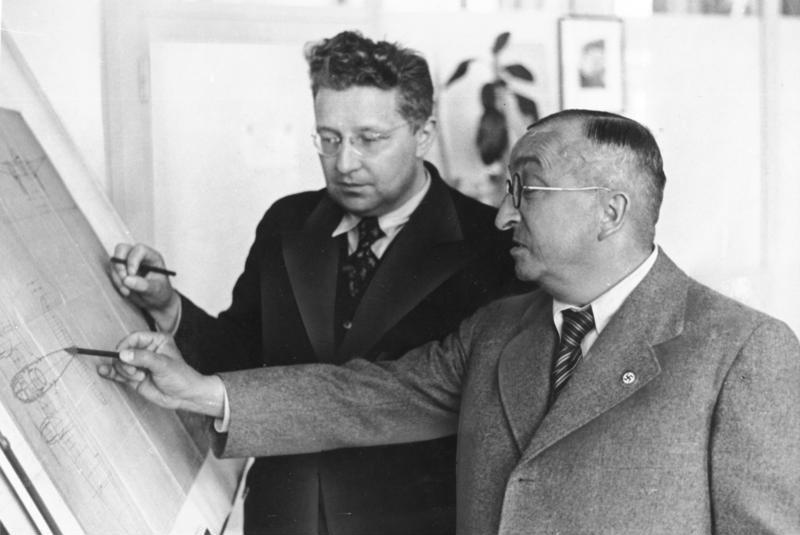
Ernst Heinkel (right) with Siegfried Günter.

In 1921, Heinkel was appointed head designer of the recently re-established Caspar-Werke, but soon left after a dispute over ownership of a design. In 1922 he established the Heinkel-Flugzeugwerke company at Warnemünde. Due to the restrictions placed on German aircraft manufacturing by the Treaty of Versailles, Heinkel looked overseas for contracts, with some seaplane designs being licence-built in Sweden and working on catapult-launched seaplanes for the Imperial Japanese Navy. He installed a similar catapult on the ocean liner Bremen for launching mail planes.

=== Versailles Treaty violations ===
Between 1921 and 1924, the Japanese government placed several orders with Heinkel's company, and helped him skirt the Versailles Treaty, which banned the construction of military aircraft in Germany, by informing the company of facility inspections by allied commissions in advance. Japan was part of the inspection commission. Heinkel hid his aircraft in dunes behind his plant and they were never discovered during inspections. Heinkel noted in his memoirs that his company's relationship with Japan in the 1920s led to decades of cooperation.

== 1933–1945 ==
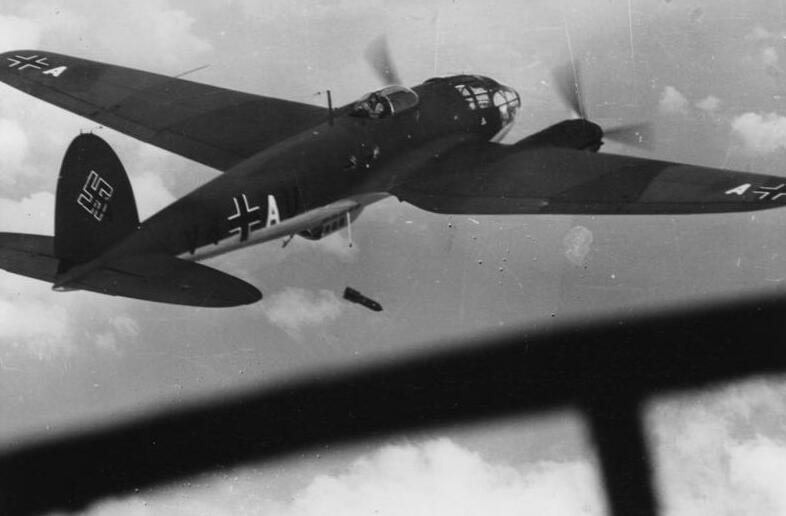
Heinkel He 111P dropping bombs over Poland, September 1939

After Adolf Hitler came to power, designs by Heinkel's firm formed a vital part of the Luftwaffe's growing strength in the years leading up to the Second World War. This included the Heinkel He 59, the Heinkel He 115 and the Heinkel He 111. He was designated a Wehrwirtschaftführer (defence industry leader) by the German government for his commitment to rearmament.

Heinkel was passionate about high-speed flight, and was keen on exploring alternative forms of aircraft propulsion. He donated aircraft to Wernher von Braun who was investigating rocket propulsion for aircraft, as well as sponsoring the research of Hans von Ohain into turbojet engines, leading to the flight of the Heinkel He 178, the first aircraft to fly solely under turbojet power, on August 27, 1939.

Heinkel had been a critic of Hitler's regime, having been forced to fire Jewish designers and staff in 1933; he was, however, a member of the Nazi Party, and was awarded the German National Prize for Art and Science in 1938, one of the rarest honors of the German government. Heinkel Flugzeugwerke used forced Jewish labor, starting in 1941.

In 1943, the armaments authority finally ordered him to transform the company into "Ernst Heinkel AG". Heinkel retained two-thirds of the capital, but became chairman of the supervisory board. Heinkel moved to Vienna and started a new design bureau and corporate offices in Vienna's Schwechat suburb, establishing manufacturing facilities in Zwölfaxing and Floridsdorf as the Heinkel-Sud complex for his firm, the original Rostock-"Marienehe" plant (today's Rostock-Schmarl neighborhood) becoming the Heinkel-Nord facility. It was at the Heinkel-Sud offices that Dr. Heinkel worked on the Heinkel He 274 four-engined high-altitude heavy bomber design—as one of the trio of proposals for aircraft designs to succeed his firm's failed Heinkel He 177A heavy bomber—including an unbuilt Amerikabomber design—until the war's end concluded the production of the firm's Spatz single-seat jet fighter.

== Post-war ==
In July 1945 Heinkel was captured by American troops and held for possible exploitation and/or possible trial under Operation Dustbin, and was held for a time at Kransberg Castle, near Frankfurt.

With Germany forbidden from manufacturing aircraft by the Allies, Heinkel used his company's facilities to build private transportation. In 1953 Heinkel began production of the Tourist scooter, followed by the Perle moped in 1954. In 1956 he introduced the Heinkel Kabine bubble car. Bubble car and moped production ceased shortly after the restriction on aircraft manufacture was lifted, but scooter production continued until 1965. In 1959, Heinkel's company was sued by Edmund Bartl for being enriched by slave labour during World War II; however, the German Supreme Court dismissed his claims for filing too late, and ordered Bartl to pay court costs and attorney's fees.

== Death and legacy ==
Heinkel died in 1958 in Stuttgart. His autobiography, Stürmisches Leben, was published in 1956 and translated into English as He1000 in its British edition and Stormy Life: Memoirs of a Pioneer of the Air Age in its US edition.

In 1981, Heinkel was inducted into the International Air & Space Hall of Fame at the San Diego Air & Space Museum.

== Sources ==
- Heinkel, Ernst (1956). He 1000. London, Great Britain: Hutchinson & Co.
- Warsitz, Lutz (2009). The First Jet Pilot - The Story of German Test Pilot Erich Warsitz. Pen and Sword Books. 9781844158188.English Edition
