= Williams International =

American manufacturer of small gas turbine engines

- Trade name: Williams
- Formerly: Williams Research Corporation
- Industry: Aerospace
- Founded: 1954
- Founder: Sam B. Williams
- Headquarters: Pontiac, Michigan, United States
- Website: williams-int.com

Williams International is an American manufacturer of small gas turbine engines based in Pontiac, Michigan, United States. It produces jet engines for cruise missiles and small jet aircraft.

== History ==
Dr. Sam B. Williams worked at Chrysler on their automotive turbine systems, but always imagined a wider set of applications for the small gas turbine engine. He left Chrysler to form Williams Research Corporation in Birmingham, Michigan, in 1954. In 1981, the company became Williams International. It has been building small turbofan engines since the 1950s for use in cruise missiles as well as target and reconnaissance drones.

Using the missile engines, Williams developed a series of personal VTOL flying craft, including a jet-powered belt in 1969, the Williams Aerial Systems Platform (WASP), also known as the "flying pulpit" in the 1970s, and the X-Jet, which was evaluated by the United States Army in the 1980s. The WASP platform was the only competitor to the Garrett STAMP in the United States Marine Corps STAMP (Small Tactical Aerial Mobility Platform) program of the early 1970s.

Also in the 1980s, Williams identified a need in the general aviation market for a small, light jet engine to power cost-effective personal and corporate jet aircraft. The company introduced the FJ44 engine, which in turn made possible the introduction of a number of small jet aircraft.

In 1992, NASA initiated its Advanced General Aviation Transport Experiments (AGATE) program to partner with manufacturers and help develop technologies that would revitalize the sagging general aviation industry. In 1996, Williams joined AGATE's General Aviation Propulsion program to develop a fuel-efficient turbofan engine that would be even smaller than the FJ44. The result was the FJX-2 engine. Williams then contracted with Burt Rutan's Scaled Composites to design and build the Williams V-Jet II, a Very Light Jet to use as a testbed and technology demonstrator to showcase the new engine. The aircraft and engine were debuted at the 1997 Oshkosh Airshow. The production version of the engine, the EJ22 flew on the prototype Eclipse 500 VLJ (which had evolved from the V-Jet II), but was subsequently replaced by a Pratt & Whitney engine.

== Products ==
=== Aircraft ===
Model name	First flight	Number built	Type
Williams X-Jet	1980	3	Flying platform
Williams V-Jet II	1997	1	Twin jet engine monoplane business jet

=== Engines ===
Williams Model Number	US Military Designation	Configuration	Power	First Run	Role
WR1		regenerative free-turbine turboshaft	70 shaft horsepower	1955	Installed in a small boat and run on the Detroit River.
Jet No. 1		single-stage centrifugal compressor, annular burner, centrifugally-fed atomizing nozzles, and a single-stage axial turbine.	60 lbf	1957	
WR2-1		single-shaft, centrifugal/centrifugal-axial flow turbojet	70 lbf	1960	
WR2-2A		single-shaft, centrifugal/centrifugal-axial flow turbojet	95 lbf	1962	Canadair CL-89
WR2-4		single-shaft, centrifugal/centrifugal-axial flow turbojet	105 lbf	1964	Canadair CL-89
WR2-5		single-shaft, centrifugal/centrifugal-axial flow turbojet	115 lbf	1965	Canadair CL-89
WR2-6		single-shaft, centrifugal/centrifugal-axial flow turbojet	125 lbf	1968	Canadair CL-89
WR24-6	J400-WR-400	single-shaft, centrifugal/centrifugal-axial flow turbojet	121 lbf	1968	Northrop MQM-74A Chukar I
WR24-7	J400-WR-402	two-stage axial/centrifugal compressor, centrifugal-axial flow turbojet	176 lbf	1973	Northrop MQM-74C Chukar II
WJ24-8E	J400-WR-104	two-stage axial/centrifugal compressor, centrifugal-axial flow turbojet	240 lbf	1995	Raytheon AGM-154 Joint Standoff Weapon (JSOW)
WJ24-8	J400-WR-404	two-stage axial/centrifugal compressor, centrifugal-axial flow turbojet	240 lbf	1983	Northrop BQM-74E Chukar III, Boeing X-48A
WR24-8G / WJ24-8G	J400-WR-405	two-stage axial/centrifugal compressor, centrifugal-axial flow turbojet	300 lbf	2003	Northrop BQM-74F Chukar
WJ24-8M		two-stage axial/centrifugal compressor, centrifugal-axial flow turbojet	300 lbf	2014	MBDA Marte-ER
WR19	Williams F107	Turbofan	430 lbf	1969	AGM-86, BGM-109
	Williams F112	twin-spool counter rotating turbofan	732 lbf	1985(?)	X-36, X-50, AGM-129
Williams EJ22		3-spool medium-bypass ratio turbofan	770 lbf	2000(?)	Eclipse 500 VLJ
Williams FJ33		Turbofan	1,846 lbf	1998(?)	Cirrus Vision SF50
Williams FJ44	F129-WR	Turbofan	1,900 lbf	July 12, 1988	Cessna CitationJet
WR36-1	F121-WR-100	2-stage axial fan, 6-stage axial compressor, single spool turbofan	70 lbf	July 30, 1984	Northrop AGM-136A Tacit Rainbow
WR38-15 / WJ38-15 / P8300‐15	F122-WR-100	twin-shaft, axial-centrifugal-flow turbofan	900 lbf	2002	Northrop AGM-137A/MGM-137B TSSAM, Taurus KEPD 350
Williams WR34		Turboshaft			
Williams WTS117					Canadair CL-327

== See also ==
- EV1 Series Hybrid, a gas turbine hybrid vehicle prototype
- Chrysler turbine engines
