= Garrett STAMP =

STAMP

General information
- Type: Research two-seat VTOL vehicle
- National origin: United States
- Manufacturer: AiResearch Manufacturing Co.
- Number built: 1

The Garrett STAMP (Small Tactical Aerial Mobility Platform) was a two-person aircraft prototype made by a division of AiResearch Manufacturing Co. of Phoenix, Arizona, for the United States Marine Corps STAMP program, in the early 1970s.

== Development ==
The prototype took off and manoeuvred by means of a ducted fan, much like the Harrier. Unlike the Harrier it had no wings and had to depend on the fan's thrust for lift at all times. This gave it an expected range of 30 miles (48 km) at a speed of 75 mph (120 kph). The power came from a Garrett TSE-231 turbine normally used to power helicopters. The turbine gave 1050 pounds (476kg) of thrust by running at 6000 rpm. Two persons sat in a closed cockpit adapted from an OH-6 helicopter.

The prototype was successfully tested in tethered flight on December 21, 1973 inside a hangar at Marine Corps Air Station El Toro in California. Its competitor in the STAMP program was a one-person open-cockpit craft called the Williams Aerial Systems Platform (WASP), made by Williams International.

== See also ==
- Personal air vehicle
- List of personal air vehicles
- List of VTOL aircraft
- Flying platform
- Williams X-Jet
