= DH4 =

DH4 may refer to:

- Airco DH.4, British World War I two-seat biplane
- de Lackner HZ-1 Aerocycle, also known as the YHO-2 and DH-4 Heli-Vector (1950s)
- Bombardier Dash 8 Q400, turboprop passenger airliner (since 1996, called DH4 by various airlines)
