= Bensen B-10 =

1950s American experimental VTOL aircraft by Igor Bensen

B-10 Propcopter

General information
- Type: Experimental VTOL aircraft
- National origin: USA
- Manufacturer: Bensen Aircraft
- Designer: Igor Bensen
- Number built: 1

History
- First flight: 6 August 1958

The Bensen B-10 Propcopter was an unconventional VTOL aircraft developed by Igor Bensen in the United States in the late 1950s. The pilot sat astride a beam that had an engine mounted at either end of it, each driving a rotor to provide lift. Each of these rotors was surrounded by a system of four pivotable vanes to direct its downwash, and linked to a control stick for the pilot, this provided control of the craft. Only a single prototype (registered N56U) was built.

== Specifications ==
General characteristics

- Crew: 1 pilot
- Powerplant: 2 × McCulloch piston engines , 72 hp (54 kW) each
- Main rotor diameter: 2 × 4 ft 0 in (1.20 m)

== See also ==
- Williams X-Jet – Single-person lightweight aircraft

Aircraft of comparable role, configuration, and era

- HZ-1 Aerocycle – 1954 experimental personal helicopter model by de Lackner Helicopters
- VZ-1 Pawnee – 1950s experimental American flying platform
- VZ-8 Airgeep – VTOL aircraft prototype by Piasecki Aircraft

Related lists

- List of military aircraft of the United States
