= Williams J400 =

Turbojet engine

J400 / WR2 / WR24
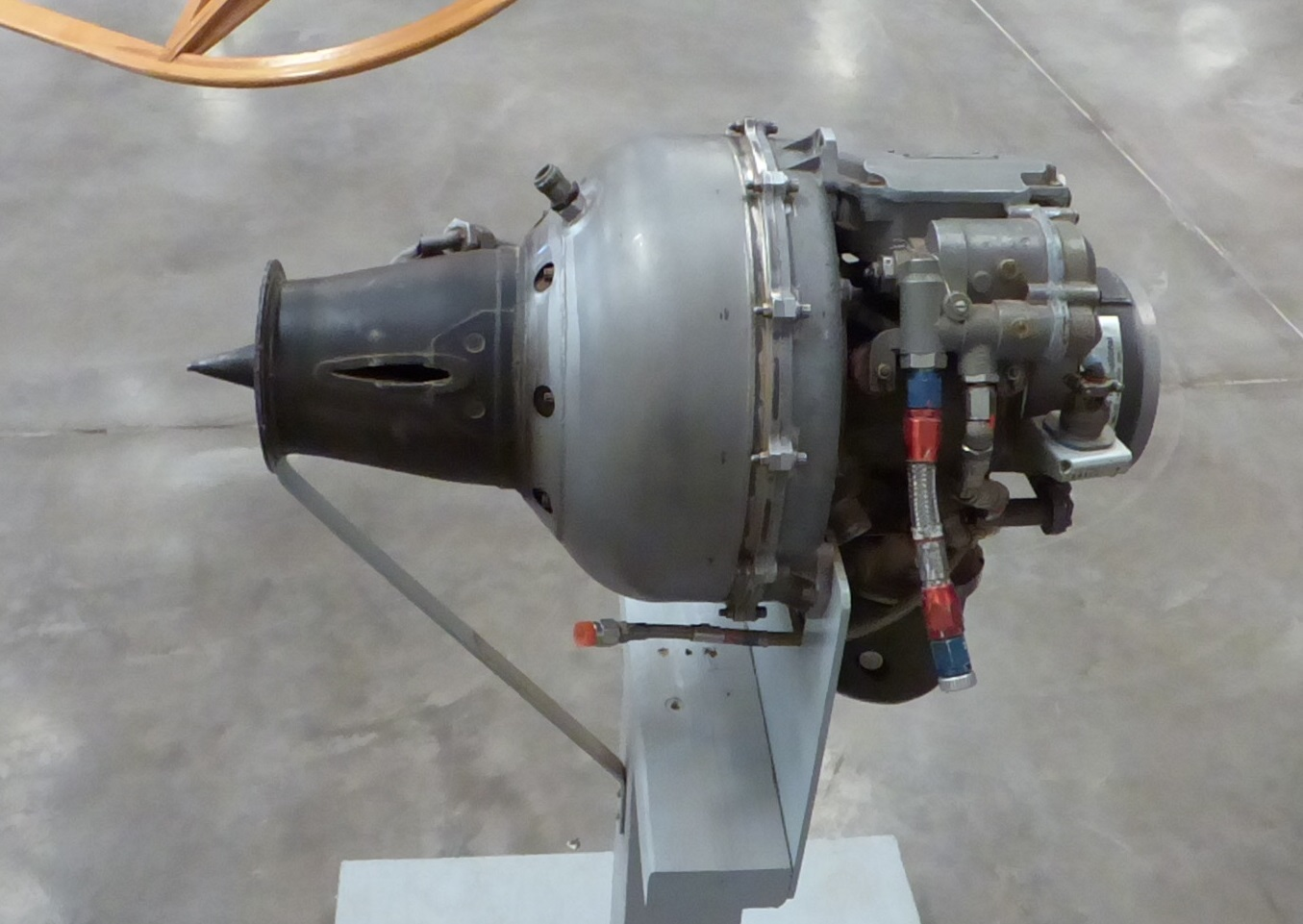
- WR24 turbojet on display at the Planes of Fame Air Museum
- Type: Turbojet
- National origin: United States
- Manufacturer: Williams International
- First run: 1960s
- Major applications: Canadair CL-89; BQM-74 Chukar

The Williams International J400 is a small turbojet engine developed by Williams Research to power target drones.

== Design ==
The J400 is a single-shaft, centrifugal/centrifugal-axial flow turbojet engine. There are two versions of the J400, the WR2 which yields 125 lbs. of thrust, and the more powerful WR24, which yields 190-240 pounds of thrust.

== Applications ==
- BQM-74 Chukar
- Canadair CL-89

== See also ==
Related lists

- List of aircraft engines
