= Canadair CL-227 Sentinel =

CL-227 Sentinel

General information
- Type: Unmanned reconnaissance helicopter
- National origin: Canada
- Manufacturer: Canadair
- Number built: 1

History
- First flight: 25 August 1978

The CL-227 Sentinel is a remote-controlled unmanned aerial vehicle (UAV) made by Canadair.

It displays a distinctively unusual bulbous peanut shaped profile which gave it its nickname of the flying peanut. Lift is provided by a set of coaxial rotors emanating from the waist of the system. The engine air is exhausted upwards to minimize the infrared signature. The blades are made of composite materials as well as all the external skin and legs, in an attempt to reduce the radar signature. The main structure is made mostly of aluminium.

The CL-227 was designed in 1977, and the "phase one" prototype made its first flight on 25 August 1978; the larger production "phase two" vehicle first flew untethered on 14 December 1981. Following evaluation by NATO in March 1982, and was made available to NATO allied clients in the early 1980s. In the late 1990s it was replaced by an updated version, the CL-327.

== Bombardier Aerospace CL-327 Guardian ==
The CL-327 was developed as an upgraded and advance version of the CL-227. The new UAV production line began in 1996 under Bombardier Aerospace, which acquired the assets of Canadair, the original developer of the CL-227.

== Specifications (CL-227 Phase 2) ==
Data from Jane's 1987-1988 p.816; Leyes and Fleming 1999, p.421

General characteristics

- Crew: None
- Max takeoff weight: 419 lb (190 kg)
- Fuel capacity: 54 kg (119 lb)
- Powerplant: 1 × Williams International WTS34-16 turboshaft, 50.0 hp (37.3 kW)
- Main rotor area: 66.3 sq ft (6.16 m^{2})

Performance

- Maximum speed: 81 mph (130 km/h, 70 kn)
- Rate of climb: 591 ft/min (3.00 m/s) at 1,500 m (4,900 ft)

Avionics

- 45 kg (99 lb) equipment capacity.

== See also ==
- Canadair CL-289
