= Northrop BQM-74 Chukar =

Target drones in the US Navy

BQM-74 Chukar
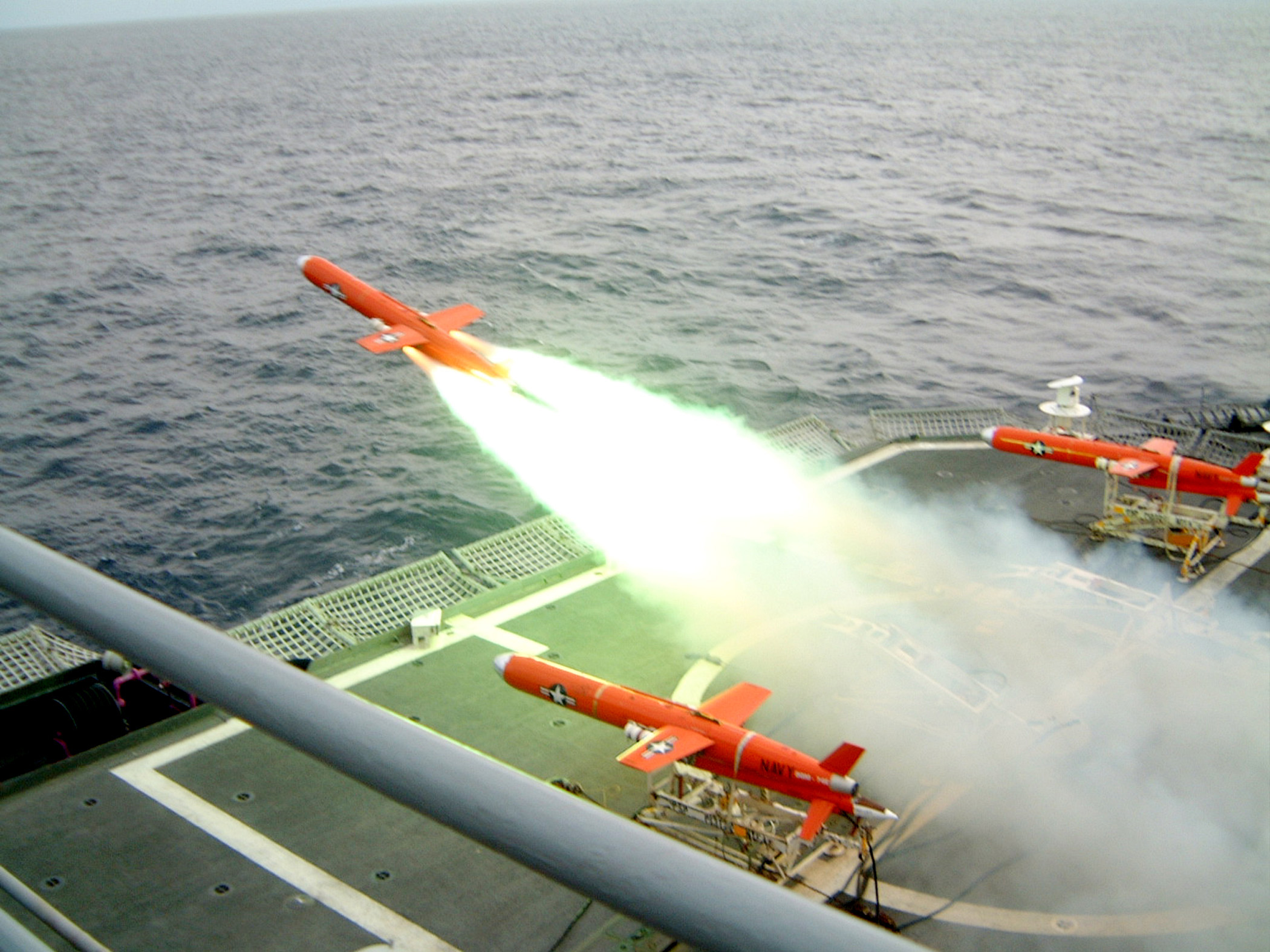

General information
- Type: Unmanned Aerial Vehicle
- Manufacturer: Northrop

History
- Introduction date: 1968, United States Navy
- First flight: 1965

The BQM-74 Chukar is a series of aerial target drones produced by Northrop. The Chukar has gone through three major revisions, including the initial MQM-74A Chukar I, the MQM-74C Chukar II, and the BQM-74C Chukar III. They are recoverable, remote controlled, subsonic aerial target, capable of speeds up to Mach 0.86 and altitudes from 30,000 to 40,000 ft (9,000 to 12,000 m).

== Description ==
The BQM-74E is propelled during flight by a single Williams J400 (J400-WR-404) turbojet engine, which produces a maximum thrust of 240 lbf (1,100 N) at sea level. The BQM-74 is launched from a zero length ground launcher using dual Jet Assisted Takeoff (JATO) bottles. When equipped with an air launch kit, the BQM-74 can be air launched from a TA-4J, F-16, Grumman Gulfstream I or DC-130 aircraft. The BQM-74 is used primarily as a realistic aerial target, capable of simulating enemy threats for gunnery and missile training exercises.

Drones are capable of being recovered following a training exercise. A parachute is deployed by remote control or if the remote control link is severed and a flotation kit can be added for sea-based recovery. If recovery of the drone is required, special telemetry warheads are used on the defensive missile in place of explosives. This telemetry warhead is desirable since it allows for extensive analysis of the performance of the defensive missile, including miss distance information that determines if a real warhead would have damaged the target. A direct hit would likely destroy the drone. Gunnery systems would use non-explosive dummy munitions. Since gunnery systems are aimed in front of a moving target so it will fly through the blast-fragments, dummy munitions do not have to directly hit a target. Analysis of radar data would determine if actual explosive munitions would have damaged the target drone.

== Development ==
=== MQM-74A Chukar I ===
The Chukar series began in the early 1960s with a United States Navy requirement for a new target drone. The company developed a prototype with the company designation of NV-105 and featuring a delta wing, flying it in 1964. The delta wing didn't work out and was replaced by a straight wing, resulting in the NV-105A, which was first flown in 1965. The NV-105A was accepted by the Navy and went into production as the MQM-74A in 1968.

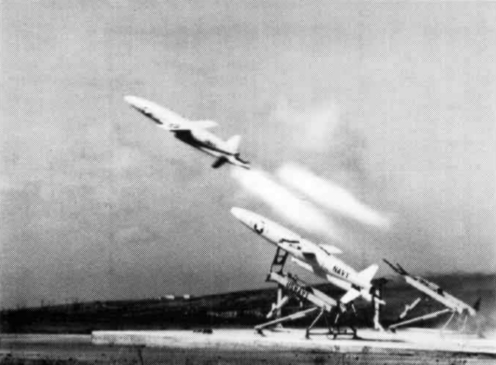
A U.S. Navy MQM-74A launch, 1972.

The MQM-74A had a neatly tapered cigar-shaped fuselage, straight mid-mounted wings, an underslung jet engine with the intake under the wings, and a conventional tail configuration with the tailplanes set in an inverted vee. It was powered by a Williams International WR24-6 turbojet engine with a thrust of 121 lbf (540 N), and was launched by RATO booster from the ground or a ship. The Navy purchased 1,800 MQM-74A Chukar Is. Several hundred more were purchased in total by NATO for a multinational test range on the island of Crete, as well as the Royal Navy and the Italian Navy.

Chukar is the name of an Asian species of partridge, introduced to America and as they are hunted for sport, it seems that Northrop felt that the name was appropriate for an aircraft whose purpose in life is to be shot at. The name Chukar is only formally applied to export versions of the drone, but informally it is used for all variants.

=== XBQM-108 ===
In the mid-1970s, the US Naval Weapons Center used the MQM-74A as the basis for an experimental drone designated the XBQM-108, which was to be used to as a demonstrator for a "pogo" or "tailsitter" aircraft that could take off and land straight up and down on its tail. The fuselage, tailfin, radio control system, and parachute recovery system of the MQM-74A were retained, but the drone was fitted with a new wing, a Teledyne CAE J402 engine with a rotating vectored thrust exhaust, fixed tricycle landing gear, and additional flight control systems. The demonstrator was completed and was making tethered flights when the program was canceled.

=== MQM-74C Chukar II ===
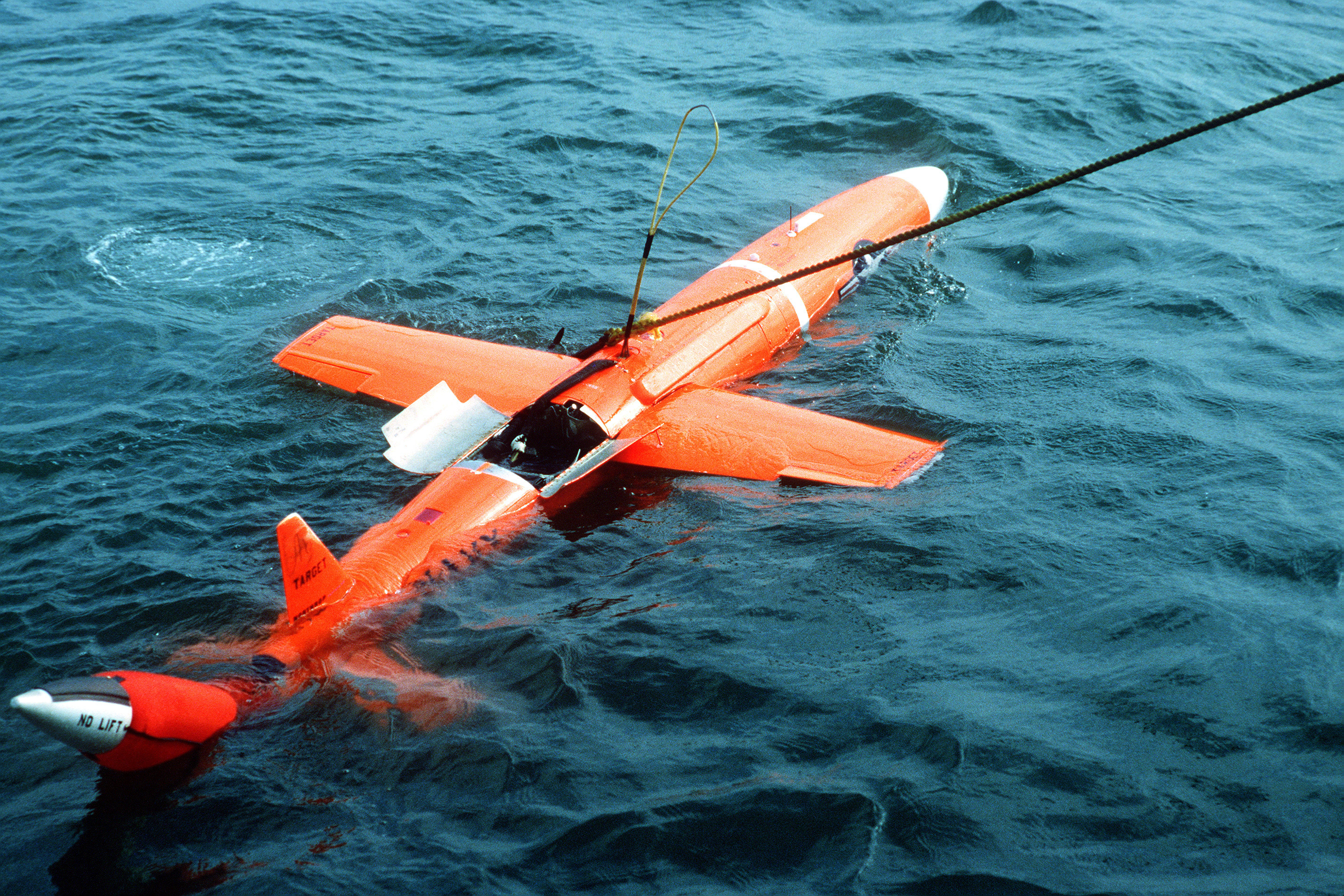
MQM-74C Chukar II floating and being recovered.

The Navy liked the Chukar I but wanted a somewhat faster version, and in the early 1970s Northrop developed the improved experimental MQM-74B, which was followed by the production MQM-74C Chukar II. The Chukar II is difficult to distinguish from the Chukar I, but the Chukar II is slightly scaled up and uses an uprated Williams WR24-7 turbojet with 180 lbf (800 N) thrust, giving it a top speed of 590 mph (950 km/h; Mach 0.78).

Like the Chukar I, the Chukar II is ground or ship launched only. At least 1,400 Chukar IIs were built, mostly for the US Navy, but other customers included NATO, the United Kingdom, West Germany, Greece, Iran, Italy, Japan, the Netherlands, Saudi Arabia, and Spain. India also operated the drone under the local designation Chakor, from 1978 to 1998.

=== BQM-74C Chukar III ===
In 1978, the US Navy requested a still more sophisticated drone, and Northrop responded with the BQM-74C Chukar III. This improved variant is visibly different from its predecessors, featuring a more cylindrical fuselage, in contrast with the tapered fuselage of its predecessors.

The BQM-74C incorporates a microprocessor-based autopilot that allows it to be programmed for much more sophisticated flight operations. The BQM-74C can be air launched as well as ground launched. The original engine was the Williams WR24-7A AKA J400-WR-402, with 180 lbf (800 N) of thrust, but in 1986 production was upgraded to the J400-WR-403 with 240 lbf (1,100 N) of thrust. The BQM-74C is stressed for maneuvers of up to 6g. More than 1,600 BQM-74Cs have been built.

Northrop built ten BQM-74C Recce UAVs for tactical reconnaissance for US Navy evaluation, but this variant did not go into production.

=== BQM-74E Chukar III ===
The BQM-74C has now been replaced in production by the BQM-74E, which is externally all but identical but incorporates the uprated J400-WR-404 engine as standard, and has a third greater range and endurance than its predecessor.

=== Future versions ===
In the 1980s, Northrop built a next-generation target, the NV-144, that was substantially bigger and faster than the Chukar III, but the NV-144 did not enter production. The latest and current effort by Northrop Grumman to improve the Chukar is the BQM-74F variant of the Chukar (previously called the Target 2000). The BQM-74F has general configuration along the lines of the BQM-74C, but features swept wings, an empty weight of 600 lb (270 kg), an uprated engine with 300 lbf (1,300 N) of thrust, speed of up to Mach 0.93 (710 mph; 1,100 km/h), and a design lifetime of 20 flights. The BQM-74F will be able to simulate a range of different aircraft and cruise missiles. It will also be able to tow targets and decoys, and will be compatible with current Chukar support systems and infrastructure. The Navy awarded Northrop Grumman a development contract in 2002, and the first BQM-74F was unveiled on 22 August 2005, with its first flight taking place seven days later at the naval air station in Point Mugu, California.

== Persian Gulf War combat use ==
In the 1991 Persian Gulf War, BQM-74Cs were used as decoys during the initial air attacks into Iraq. The USAF Big Safari group was put in charge of the decoy effort, which was codenamed "Project Scathe Mean".

The Chukar drones that were available were usually launched from DC-130 director aircraft, and could also be launched from strike aircraft such as F-15s or F-16s. These launch resources were not available though, so the Navy found twelve ground launchers in their inventory that could be made serviceable, while RATO booster units were found stockpiled in Belgium. Each BQM-74C was fitted with a pair of corner reflectors to enhance its radar signature to imitate a manned aircraft.

A 40-person team of specialists, obtained from disbanded ground-launched cruise missile units (see 868th Tactical Missile Training Squadron), was assembled in a few days and designated the "4468th Tactical Reconnaissance Group". The 4468th TRG moved quickly, with trucks modified and obtained from a California commercial trucking firm, tool kits purchased from Sears, and field gear bought from war surplus stores. The teams were given quick training, equipped with 44 Navy BQM-74Cs, and sent to Saudi Arabia in two six-launcher teams in about two weeks, arriving near the Iraqi border on 15 October 1990. The northern team was sited to cover Baghdad and large military bases in that area, while the southern team was sited to cover Basra and Kuwait City.

When the Gulf War air campaign began on the night of 17 January 1991, Iraq was hit by attack waves of Lockheed F-117 Nighthawk stealth fighters and BGM-109 Tomahawk cruise missiles. A group of 38 BQM-74Cs were assigned to be launched as diversion for the second wave of attacks, with the launches generally in groups of three, and 37 were launched successfully in precisely timed waves. One group of three was intercepted by Iraqi aircraft, while all the others made it to target.

The drones flew over 310 miles (500 km) at 390 mph (Mach 0.51; 630 km/h), then began to circle Baghdad for up to 20 minutes. Iraqi air defense radars which probed for the drones were engaged by allied strike aircraft firing AGM-88 HARMs (High-speed Anti-Radiation Missiles). The Navy also launched ADM-141 TALDs (Tactical Air Launched Decoys) to contribute to the countermeasures blitz. Iraqi air defenses never recovered from this blow, and though large Allied aircraft losses had been predicted, the Iraqis only succeeded in shooting down 44 manned aircraft. After the war, the 4468th was disbanded, and one of the remaining BQM-74Cs was donated to the National Museum of the United States Air Force at Wright-Patterson AFB in Ohio, where it is now on display.

== USS Chancellorsville accident ==
On 16 November 2013, a BQM-74E hit and damaged the USS Chancellorsville (CG-62), slightly injuring two sailors and making a hole in the superstructure just above the deck. The drone was supposed to turn away more than a mile from the cruiser during exercises to test the latest version of the Aegis Combat System, but instead continued straight into the ship.

== Operators ==
Israel

- Israeli Air Force

Italy

- Italian Navy

United Kingdom

- Royal Navy

United States

- United States Navy

Japan

- Japan Maritime Self-Defense Force

=== Former operators ===
India

- Indian Air Force

== Specifications ==
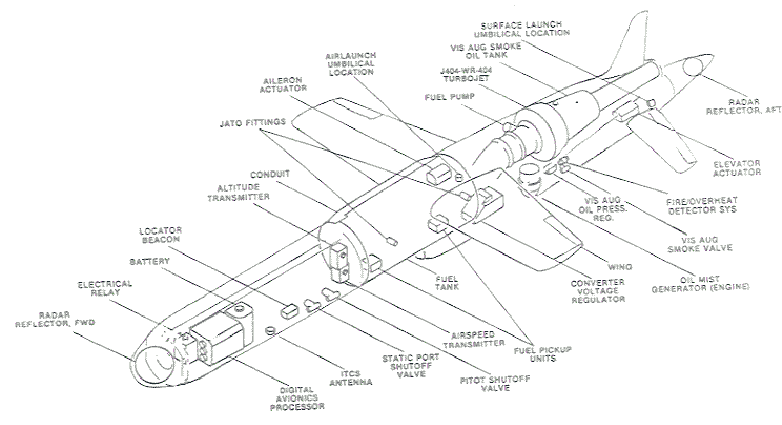
Diagram of a BQM-74E Chukar

General characteristics

- Crew: 0
- Length: 12 ft 11 in (3.94 m)
- Wingspan: 5 ft 9 in (1.76 m)
- Height: 2 ft 4 in (0.71 m)
- Empty weight: 271 lb (123 kg)
- Gross weight: 549 lb (249 kg)
- Powerplant: 1 × Williams J400-WR-404 turbojet , 240 lbf (1.1 kN) thrust

Performance

- Maximum speed: 606 mph (972 km/h, 527 kn)
- Endurance: 1 hours 8 minutes
- Service ceiling: 40,000 ft (12,000 m)

== See also ==
- History of UAVs decoys
- DRDO Lakshya

Designation sequence: BGM-71 – MIM-72 – UGM-73 – BQM-74 – BGM-75 – AGM-76 – FGM-77
