= Williams F121 =

Turbofan engine

F121
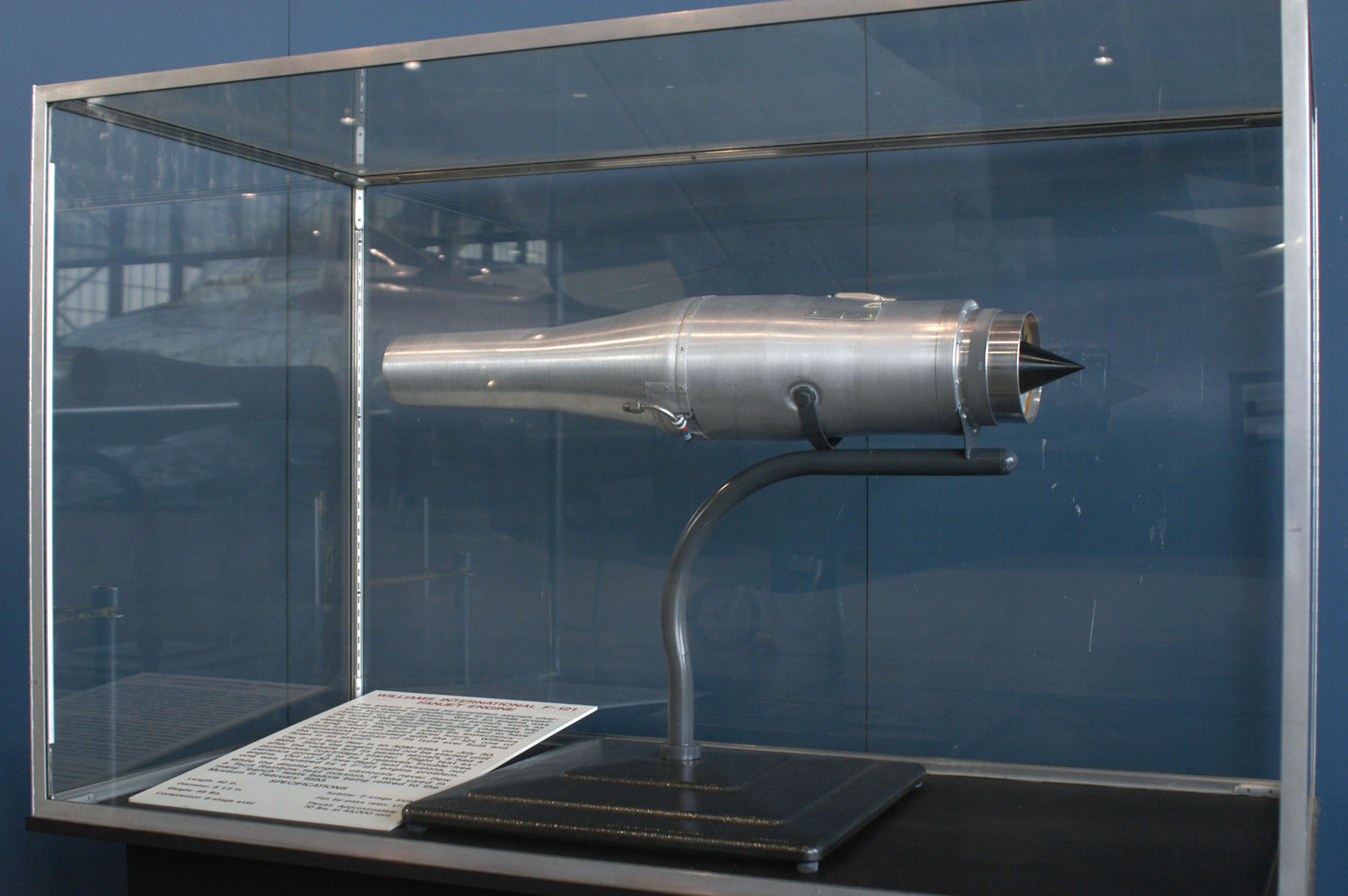
- Williams F121 on display at the National Museum of the United States Air Force
- Type: Turbofan
- Manufacturer: Williams International
- First run: 1984
- Major applications: AGM-136 Tacit Rainbow

The Williams F121 (company designation WR36-1) is a small turbofan engine designed for use in the AGM-136 Tacit Rainbow anti-radiation cruise missile.

== Development and design ==
The F121 engine had a rare set of design parameters as it is designed to be used only once. As a cruise missile engine, it was designed to have a long shelf life (be able to sit around unused for long periods of time) and then operate when needed for several hours. It was designed to power the AGM-136 Tacit Rainbow, which was to be a stand-off anti radiation missile. Its first flight was on July 30, 1984. The AGM-136 program was canceled several years later.

Another unique feature of the engine is that it was started with an explosive cartridge because it couldn't start while still mated to its aircraft.

In the late 2000s, the engine was being used by the Naval Air Warfare Center at Naval Air Weapons Station China Lake to test fuel performance and additives.

== Specifications ==
Data from

==== General characteristics ====
- Type: Single Spool Turbofan
- Length: 40 in (1.01 m)
- Diameter: 8.5 in (0.22 m)
- Dry weight: 49 lb (22.22 kg)

==== Components ====
- Compressor: 1 stage axial fan, 6-stage axial compressor
- Combustors: Turbomeca Piméné-type
- Turbine: 2-stage axial

==== Performance ====
- Maximum thrust: 70 lbf (0.31 kN)
- Bypass ratio: 1.7:1
- Air mass flow: 5 lb (2,268.0 g) per second (approx)
- Thrust-to-weight ratio: 1.43

== See also ==
Related lists

- List of aircraft engines
