= Canadair =

Canadian aerospace company (1944–1986)

- Predecessor: Canadian Vickers
- Founded: 11 November 1944; 81 years ago
- Founder: Benjamin W. Franklin
- Defunct: 1986; 40 years ago
- Fate: Acquired by Bombardier
- Successor: Bombardier Aerospace
- Headquarters: Montreal, Quebec, Canada
- Parent: General Dynamics (1952–1954); Convair (1954–1976)

Canadair Ltd. was a Canadian civil and military aircraft manufacturer that operated from 1944 to 1986. In 1986, its assets were acquired by Bombardier Aerospace, the aviation division of Canadian transport conglomerate Bombardier Inc.

Canadair's origins lie in the establishment of a factory for Canadian Vickers in the Saint-Laurent borough of Montreal, at Cartierville Airport. It was created as a separate entity by the government of Canada on 11 November, 1944.

Throughout much of its existence, it was a subsidiary of various other aircraft manufacturers prior to being nationalized by the Canadian government in 1976. For a decade, the company operated as a federally-owned Crown corporation. In 1986, Canadair was privatized via its sale to Bombardier, after which it became a core element of the firm's aerospace division. The company's former principal manufacturing facility, Canadair Plant One, remains intact, although Cartierville Airport itself has been closed and since undergone redevelopment.

During its operational years, Canadair achieved several aviation firsts; the CL-44D, based on the British Bristol Britannia airliner, was the first design that allowed access by swinging the entire rear fuselage. The CL-89 and CL-289 were the first surveillance drones to be put into service in several countries' armed forces. The experimental CL-84 was the first VTOL aircraft that rotated the wings to achieve vertical lift-off (tiltwing). The CL-215 was the first purpose-designed water bomber.

== History ==
Canadair was formally created on 11 November 1944 as a separate entity by the government of Canada. Having absorbed the operations of the Canadian Vickers company, it initially operated as a manufacturer of Consolidated PBY "Canso" flying boats on behalf of the Royal Canadian Air Force (RCAF). Benjamin W. Franklin became its first president. In addition to the PBY contract, a development contract to produce a new variant of the Douglas DC-4 transport was also underway. The resulting aircraft, the Canadair DC-4M, which was powered by an arrangement of four British-sourced Rolls-Royce Merlin engines, began production during 1946; it was marketed under the "Northstar" name.

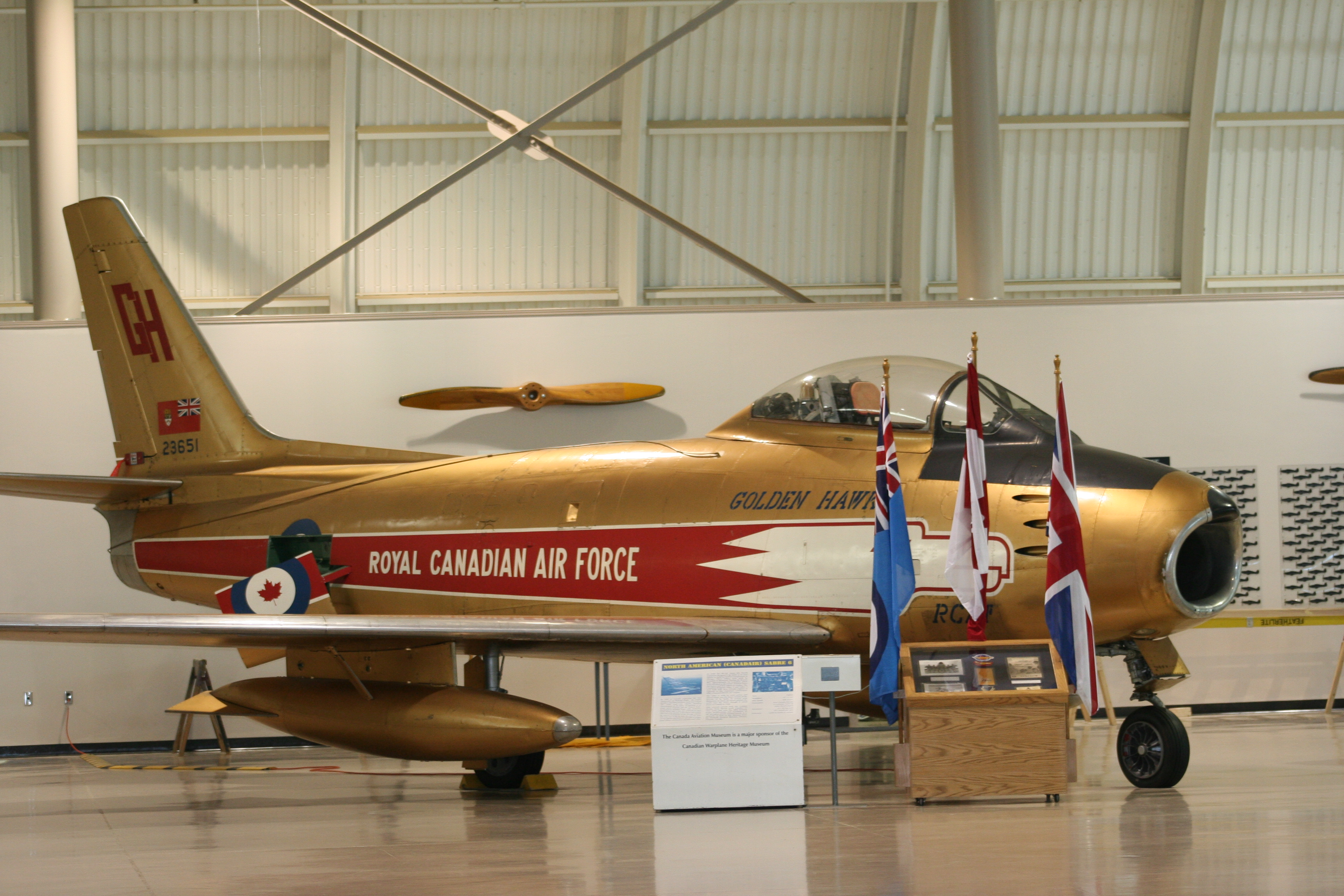
Canadair Sabre in the colours of the Golden Hawks, on display at the Canadian Warplane Heritage Museum, Mount Hope, Ontario

During the immediate postwar era, Canadair purchased the "work in progress" on the existing Douglas DC-3/C-47 series. In 1946, the Electric Boat Company, an American industrial group, bought a controlling interest in the company; shortly thereafter, the two companies merged to form the American company General Dynamics in 1952. During 1954, General Dynamics opted to purchase Convair, which had been created by the merger of Consolidated Aircraft and Vultee Aircraft; as a result of this purchase, Canadair was reorganized as Convair's Canadian subsidiary.

During the 1950s, Canadair decided that it would develop its own indigenous trainer aircraft as a private venture. This aircraft, which would become the CT-114 Tutor was the product of the company’s in-house Preliminary Design department. By August 1957, the basic configuration had been completed, which was of a turbojet-powered, low-wing aircraft, complete with a tricycle undercarriage and a side-by-side cockpit arrangement. Despite a lack of official backing from the Canadian Government, the Royal Canadian Air Force's (RCAF) Directorate of Training’s Jet Trainer Liaison Committee had closely engaged with the company; their involvement in the project had reportedly made a significant impact in the aircraft's final design. During September 1961, the Canadian government, having been impressed by the performance of the prototype, placed a sizeable order for 190 production aircraft on behalf of the Royal Canadian Air Force (RCAF). Serving as the service's primary trainer platform, the Tutor would be operated as such for over thirty years.

Another indigenously-developed design was the CL-215 amphibian. It arose from an internal research study during the early 1960s at Canadair, originally conceived of as a twin-engined floatplane transport based on the design of the 369 Canso (a variant of the PBY). However, it was altered into a "firefighter" following a request by forestry officials in the Quebec Service Aérien (Quebec Government Air Service) who wanted a more effective way of delivering water to forest fires. The 1962 preliminary design, designated as the CL-204, was a purpose-designed water bomber that evolved into an amphibian flying boat configuration, powered by two shoulder-mounted 2,100 hp (1,566 kW) Pratt & Whitney R-2800 piston engines. Its design was shaped by a desire for the CL-205 to be well-suited for performing a range of roles, including air-sea search and rescue, cargo haulage and commercial passenger-carrying, in addition to the water bomber mission. The definitive design was publicly revealed at the 1965 Paris Air Show. While the CL-215A served as the standard water bomber configuration, another model, designated as the CL-215C, had been envisioned to dispense with compromises meant to enhance its performance at the water bomber role, allowing it be furnished with larger doors on the sides of the fuselage and a revised underfloor hull structure.

Perhaps the company's most commercially successful product was the Challenger 600 business jet. Originally conceived of by the American aviation inventor Bill Lear as the LearStar 600, at the end of 1975, Canadair gave its backing to the concept; during April 1976, the company opted to acquire the whole project, formally launching it with the backing of the Canadian federal government shortly thereafter. Development of the Challenger 600 was hampered by a deadly crash amid the flight test programme on 3 April 1980; despite this, type certification for the aircraft was approved by both Transport Canada and the Federal Aviation Administration later that same year. The high cost of developing the Challenger 600 has been attributed as a major cause of Canadair's poor financial situation during the 1980s, being reportedly close to bankruptcy; the company's condition in turn ultimately contributed to its acquisition by Bombardier Inc. during 1986. In the long run, the business jet was well received by the market and can be considered to be a success, being produced for over four decades. In excess of 1,000 Challenger 600s had been reportedly completed by late 2018.

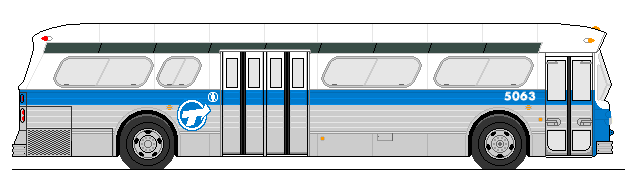
In 1965–66, Canadair built a batch of Flxible New Look buses under license. All 50 were for the Montreal Transit Commission.

Outside of the field of aviation, Canadair opted to diversify into various other sectors, developing its own range of industrial and commercial products. The "Canarch" division was involved in curtain wall design and manufacture for a number of buildings. They also produce the cabins for many air traffic control towers operated by the Federal Aviation Administration in the United States. Both tracked and air-cushioned vehicles were designed and underwent testing; however none proceeded into commercial production.

In the late 1950s, the United States Army contracted Canadair to develop a small light-weight all-terrain amphibious tracked vehicle. In turn, Canadair developed the CL-70 RAT Remote Articulated Track; this vehicle, while not a commercial success, gave Canadair useful experience towards the development of the upgraded CL-91 Dynatrac, which was a marketing success and purchased by the US Army as XM-571.

During 1976, the Canadian government nationalized Canadair Ltd. by reacquiring its corporate assets from General Dynamics. It remained a federal crown corporation until 1986 when, having experienced record losses during its development of the Challenger business jet, the Mulroney government sold it to Bombardier Inc. Shortly after Canadair's acquisition, Bombardier was able to restore it to profitability; the company soon acquired other aviation companies, such as the near-bankrupt Short Brothers of Belfast, Northern Ireland, and the business jet specialist Learjet of Wichita, Kansas, as well as de Havilland Aircraft of Canada of Toronto, Ontario. Together with these other entities, Canadair became a core component of Bombardier Aerospace.

Following the company's acquisition by Bombardier, the Canadair name had continued to be prominently used in the branding of its larger series of business jets and regional jets, which have been marketed as the Canadian Regional Jet (CRJ). However, this branding has since been dropped; new projects from all of Bombardier's various aircraft divisions have since simply been known as Bombardier Aerospace.

== Products ==
Model	Name	Type	Crew	Passengers	Launch dates	Notes
CL-1	Canadair CL-1	Flying boat			First flight:	License-built variant of the Consolidated Model 28-5 (PBV-1A or Canso A and OA-10A-VI
C-4 & C-5	North Star	Cargo aircraft/Airliner	2 or 3	52	First flight: 1946; First del'y: 1948	License-built variant of the Douglas DC-4
CL-13	Sabre	Fighter aircraft	1	0	First flight: 1950; First del'y: 1950	License-built North American F-86 Sabre
CL-28	CP-107 Argus	Maritime patrol aircraft	up to 15*		First flight: 1957; First del'y: 1960	Development of the Bristol Britannia; *normal flights also included a reserve crew of four
CL-30	CT-133 Silver Star	Trainer (aircraft) / ECM / Communication	1 or 2	0	First flight: 1952; First del'y: 1952	License-built Lockheed T-33 Shooting Star
CL-41; CL-41G-5	CT-114 Tutor; Tebuan	Trainer (aircraft)	2	0	Launch date: 1960; First flight: 1962; First del'y: 1966	
CL-43		Twin-engine logistics concept aircraft				Never built, but later influenced the design for the CL-204 (later as CL-215); modified floatplane based on PBV-1 Canso (PBY-1 Catalina) with two R-1340 engines
CL-44	CC-106 Yukon the Forty-Four	Military transport aircraft/Cargo aircraft	9	134	Launch date: 1959	Based on Bristol Britannia
CL-45		ASW concept helicopter			1954	Never built; joint effort with Hiller Aircraft and was to use three T38-GE2 engines
CL-52		Bomber			1956	A USAF Boeing B-47B Stratojet was loaned to the RCAF and turned over to Canadair to test the Orenda Iroquois PS-13 engine for the Avro Arrow project. After the Arrow was cancelled the aircraft was returned to the U.S.
CL-60		Trainer/transport aircraft	1 / 2	3 / 12	1952	Beech T-36 fuselage and final assembly; program cancelled in 1953
CL-61	RAT (Remote Articulated Track)	Armored personnel carrier			1959	Prototypes for the CL-70
CL-66	CC-109 Cosmopolitan	Transport aircraft	2	52	First flight: 1959	Modified Convair CV-540
CL-70	RAT (Remote Articulated Track)	Armored personnel carrier			1959	Prototypes for the CL-91 Dynatrac
CL-84	Dynavert	Vertical/Short Takeoff/landing Experimental aircraft	2	up to 15 combat troops	First flight: May 1965	Late 1960s - No production aircraft
CL-89 & CL-289	AN/USD-501 AN/USD-502 Midge	Surveillance Drone	none	0	First flight: 1964; First del'y: 1969	
CL-90	CF-104 Starfighter	Strike fighter / Trainer (aircraft)	1 or 2	0	First flight: 1961; First del'y: 1962	License-built Lockheed F-104 Starfighter
CL-91	Dynatrac	Armored Personnel Carrier			1960s	
CL-204		Water bomber			1962	Based on CL-43 and Canadair CL-1 Canso (variant of Consolidated PBY Catalina), the concept led to production of the larger CL-215
CL-210		Satellite antenna	n/a	n/a	1965	Installed at Shirleys Bay, Ontario
CL-212		Hovercraft			1964–1967	Development transferred to General Dynamics Electric Boat
CL-213	Fisher	All-terrain vehicle	1	1	1963–1964	
CL-215	Scooper	Water Bomber	2	up to 18 passengers (utility version)	First flight: 1967; First del'y:1969	In 2016, Viking Air Ltd. acquired the Type certificate for the Canadair CL-215; total 125 built earlier.
CL-218	Flxible New Look	Transit bus	1	45	1965–1966	License-built Flxible New Look bus F2D6V-401-1
CL-219	CF-5 (CF-116 Freedom Fighter)	Strike fighter / Fighter bomber	1 or 2	0	First flight: 1968	License-built Northrop F-5 Freedom Fighter; total 240 built
CL-225		Satellite antenna	n/a	n/a	1965	Installed at Lac-Bouchette, Quebec
CL-227 & CL-327	Sentinel	Remote control unmanned aerial vehicle	none	0	First flight: 1980	
CL-251		Subcontract	n/a	n/a	1971–1975	Wing panels and other components for the Dassault Mercure airliner
CL-252					1972	Modification of two Lockheed L-188 Electra airliners for Environment Canada ice patrols
CL-257		Subcontract	n/a	n/a	1973–1985	Fuselage sections for the Boeing 747SP
CL-281		Subcontract	n/a	n/a	1977–1994	Components for the Lockheed CP-140 Aurora and P-3C Orion
CL-415	Superscooper	Water Bomber	2	1 on jump seat, 8 on bench seats	First flight: 1993; First del'y: 1994	In 2016, Viking Air acquired the Type certificate for the Canadair CL-415; total 95 built earlier.
CL-600	CC-144 Challenger	Business jet	2	8 to 19	First flight: 1978; Certification: 1980	
CL-600	CRJ 100/200	Regional jet	2*	50	First flight: 1991; Introduction: 1992	*plus flight attendants
CL-600	CRJ700/900/1000	Regional jet	2*	66-104	First flight: 1999; Introduction: 2001	*plus flight attendants

=== Missiles ===
- Velvet Glove - Air-to-air missile project.

== Leadership ==
Presidents and chairmen of Canadair were:

=== President ===
1. Benjamin W. Franklin, 1944–1946
2. H. Oliver West, 1947–1951
3. John Jay Hopkins, 1951–1952
4. J. Geoffrey Notman, 1952–1965
5. Frederick R. Kearns, 1965–1983
6. Gilbert S. Bennett, 1983–1985
7. Pierre Desmarais II, 1985–1986

=== Chairman of the Board ===
1. John Jay Hopkins, 1948–1957
2. Frank Pace Jr., 1957–1962
3. Roger Lewis, 1962–1971
4. David S. Lewis, 1971–1972
5. Gordon E. MacDonald, 1972–1975
6. James M. Beggs, 1975–1976
7. Leo Lavoie, 1976–1981
8. Guy Desmarais, 1981–1985
9. Pierre Desmarais II, 1985–1986

== See also ==
- Bombardier Aerospace
- de Havilland Canada
- Learjet
- Short Brothers
