= John Jay Hopkins =

Founder and president of General Dynamics (1893–1957)

- Born: October 15, 1893; Santa Ana, California, US
- Died: May 3, 1957 (aged 63); Georgetown University Hospital Washington, DC, US
- Education: University of California-Berkeley; Harvard Law School
- Occupation: Lawyer
- Known for: Founder and president of General Dynamics

John Jay Hopkins (October 15, 1893 – May 3, 1957) was founder and president of General Dynamics from 1952 to 1957.

Hopkins was born in Santa Ana, California.

He was assistant to the Treasury Secretary. In 1937, he joined Electric Boat as a lawyer, and eventually became director. In 1948, as president of Electric Boat, he purchased Canadair and created General Dynamics from that foundation in 1952.

Hopkins created the golf World Cup, which began as the Canada Cup in 1953, and donated the trophy for the event.

Hopkins died in Washington, DC.
