= De Lackner HZ-1 Aerocycle =

1954 experimental personal helicopter model by de Lackner Helicopters

HZ-1 Aerocycle
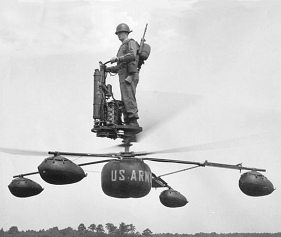

General information
- Type: Experimental rotorcraft
- National origin: United States
- Manufacturer: de Lackner Helicopters
- Designer: Lewis C. McCarty Jr.
- Primary user: United States Army
- Number built: 12

History
- First flight: 22 November 1954

The HZ-1 Aerocycle, also known as the YHO-2 and by the manufacturer's designation DH-5 Aerocycle, is an American one-man "personal helicopter" developed by de Lackner Helicopters in the mid-1950s. Intended to be operated by inexperienced pilots with a minimum of 20 minutes of instruction, the HZ-1 was expected to become a standard reconnaissance machine with the United States Army. Although early testing showed that the craft had promise for providing mobility on the atomic battlefield, more extensive evaluation proved that the aircraft was in fact too difficult to control for operation by untrained infantrymen, and after a pair of crashes the project was abandoned. A single model of the craft was put on display.

== Design and development ==
During the early 1950s, Charles H. Zimmerman of the National Advisory Committee for Aeronautics (NACA) developed a system for control of a rotorcraft in which, with the rotors mounted on the underside of the aircraft, the machine could be steered by the pilot through the simple shifting of his weight and kept stable through the actions of his natural reflexes. Known as kinesthetic control and similar in principle to the mechanics of riding a bicycle or a surfboard, it was hoped that the concept would allow pilots to operate an aircraft with little to no training time. NACA testing proved that the idea had merit, and several companies, including Bensen Aircraft, Hiller Aircraft, and de Lackner Helicopters, began development of rotorcraft using the concept.

The concept proposed by de Lackner Helicopters was a one-man flying platform and received the company designation "DH-4". The DH-4 was expected to be able to carry up to 120 pounds (54 kg) of cargo or an auxiliary 5-US-gallon (19 L; 4.2 imp gal) fuel tank to extend its range up to 50 miles (80 km) in addition to its pilot. A cargo lifting line could be threaded through the rotor shaft for the carrying of slung loads underneath the craft.

The machine was a simple, cross-shaped frame, with the pilot standing on a platform, secured by a safety harness. The harness also secured the aircraft's engine, which was sourced from an outboard motor manufactured by Mercury Marine. The engine was controlled by a twist-grip motorcycle-style throttle and transferred power to the 15-foot (4.6 m) diameter, contra-rotating rotors via belt drive with a chain reduction unit. The aircraft's landing gear consisted of airbags at the end of each arm of the frame along with a large rubber float in the middle, providing amphibious capability, although this arrangement was later replaced by a pair of conventional helicopter-type skids.

== Testing ==
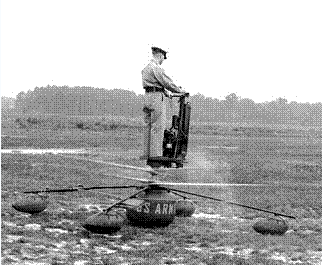
Captain Sundby test-flies the HZ-1

Originally designated YHO-2 by the U.S. Army, then later re-designated HZ-1 and named "Aerocycle", the prototype made its first tethered flight on 22 November 1954, with its first free flight taking place in January 1955 at the Brooklyn Army Terminal. Over 160 flights totaling more than 15 hours of flight time were conducted, and the results of this early test flight program were considered promising enough that a dozen examples of the type were ordered (serial numbers 56-6928 to 56-6939). Predictions were made that the craft could provide transport to a modern version of the old horse cavalry, providing airborne "eyes and ears" for the Army.

In 1956, the test program was transferred to Fort Eustis, Virginia, where Captain Selmer Sundby took over test-flying duties. The HZ-1 had been designed to be very easy to fly, and early testing indicated that untrained soldiers could learn to operate the craft in less than 20 minutes, and some claiming that only 5 minutes of instruction were required. In addition, the HZ-1 proved to be faster than other flying platform designs evaluated by the Army. Sundby, however, quickly determined that the craft was much more difficult to fly than had been expected and would not be safe in the hands of an inexperienced pilot. In addition, the low-mounted rotors proved to be prone to kicking up small rocks and other debris.

Over a series of tethered and free-flying test flights lasting up to 43 minutes, the HZ-1 suffered a pair of accidents. Both crashes occurred under similar conditions – the contra-rotating rotors intermeshed and collided, the blades shattering, causing an immediate loss of control resulting in a crash. Aerodynamic testing was conducted in the full-scale wind tunnel at the Langley Research Center, and it was discovered that the Aerocycle's forwards speed was limited by an uncontrollable pitching motion, but rotor-tip clearance was always sufficient. The inability to determine the precise cause of the intermeshing, combined with the fact that the "personal lifting device" concept was failing to live up to its expectations, led to the decision to terminate the project.

Sundby was awarded the Distinguished Flying Cross for his test-flying work with the HZ-1, going on to test-fly the H-21 and H-34 helicopters, as well as seeing combat in the Vietnam War before retiring with the rank of colonel.

=== Parachute development ===
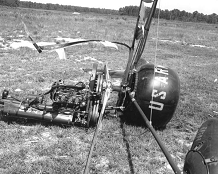
A HZ-1 following a crash

An entirely new type of parachute with extremely fast opening characteristics, the "Ultra-Fast Opening Personnel Parachute Type XMP-2", was developed for use in testing of the HZ-1 and Hiller VZ-1 flying platforms. Designed for use from 0 to 50 miles per hour (0–80 km/h) and at altitudes as low as 25 feet (7.6 m), the XMP-2 proved to have insufficient reliability for use as a personnel parachute.

== Variants ==
DH-4 Heli-Vector
Initial prototype of the Aerocycle design; one built.
DH-5 Aerocycle
Company designation for the development prototype of the HZ-1.
HZ-1 Aerocycle
the limited production aircraft delivered to the US Army; 12 built.
HO-2 Aerocycle
Designation in the US Army HO series

== Aircraft on display ==
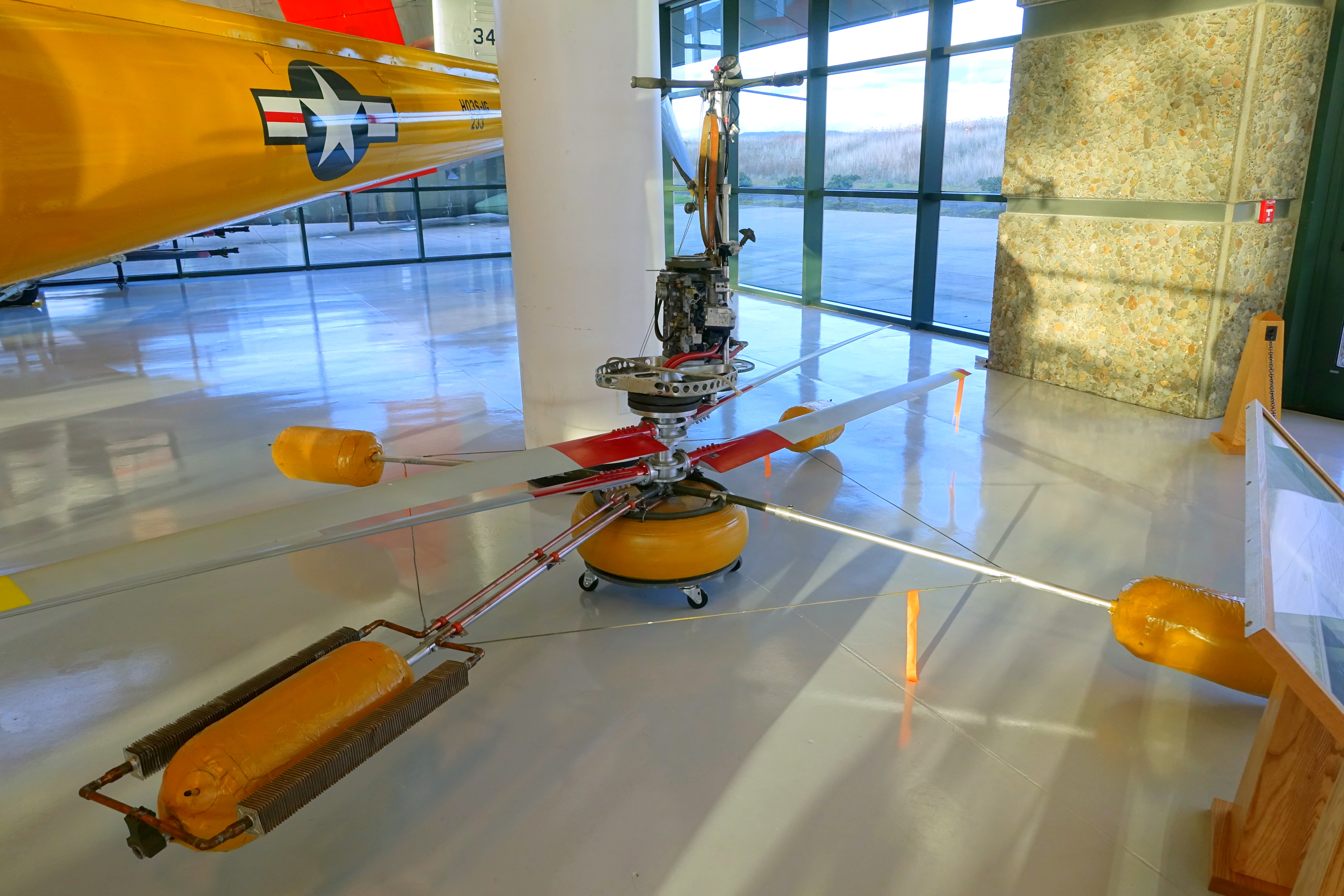
DH-4 prototype on display at the Evergreen Aviation & Space Museum

Of the dozen examples of the type ordered by the U.S. Army, only a single example of the HZ-1 has survived, and this aircraft is currently on display in the U.S. Army Transportation Museum at Fort Eustis, Newport News, Virginia. One DH-4 prototype also survives, on display at the Evergreen Aviation & Space Museum.

== Specifications (HZ-1 Aerocycle) ==
Data from

General characteristics

- Crew: 1 (pilot)
- Height: 7 ft (2.1 m) from air bags to handle bars
- Empty weight: 172 lb (78 kg)
- Gross weight: 454 lb (206 kg)
- Fuel capacity: 1 US gallon (3.8 L; 0.83 imp gal)
- Powerplant: 1 × Mercury Marine 20H outboard motor, 40 hp (30 kW)
- Main rotor diameter: 2 × 15 ft (4.6 m)

Performance

- Maximum speed: 75 mph (121 km/h, 65 kn)
- Cruise speed: 55 mph (89 km/h, 48 kn)
- Range: 15 mi (24 km, 13 nmi)
- Endurance: 45 minutes
- Service ceiling: 5,000 ft (1,500 m)

== See also ==
- PKZ-2 – Hungarian and Czech aeronautical engineers
- Williams X-Jet – Single-person lightweight aircraft
- Discopter – Dutch-American artist (1901–1989)
- Aérospatiale Ludion – Prototype VTOL aircraft

Aircraft of comparable role, configuration, and era

- Bensen B-10 – 1950s American experimental VTOL aircraft by Igor Bensen
- Hiller VZ-1 Pawnee – 1950s experimental American flying platform

Related lists

- List of military aircraft of the United States
- List of single seat helicopters
