= Hiller VZ-1 Pawnee =

1950s experimental American flying platform

VZ-1 Pawnee
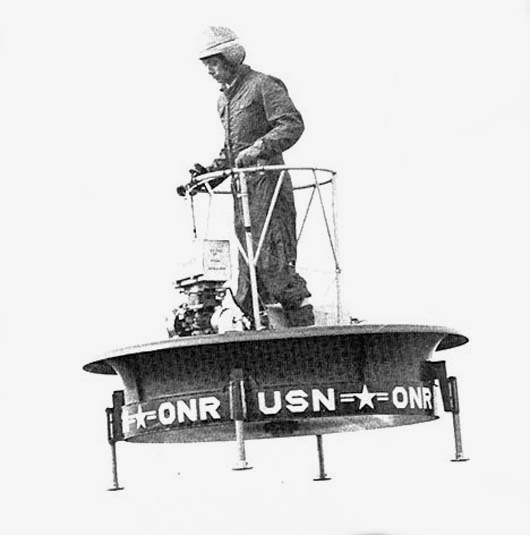

General information
- Type: Direct-lift rotor aircraft; flying platform
- Manufacturer: Hiller Aircraft
- Status: Experimental
- Primary user: United States Army
- Number built: 6

History
- First flight: 1955

The Hiller VZ-1 Pawnee (U.S. Army designation; earlier Army designation: HO-1) is a unique direct-lift rotor aircraft, using contra-rotating ducted fans for lift inside a flying platform upon which the single pilot shifted body weight for directional control. The platform was developed starting in 1953 under an Office of Naval Research (ONR) contract to Hiller Aircraft, and flew successfully beginning in 1955.

== Design and development ==
The original concept had been developed by Charles H. Zimmerman in the late 1940s. Further development followed, both by Hiller Aircraft and the De Lackner Company. There were two main models, the ONR model 1031-A-1, and the somewhat larger VZ-1 Pawnee model produced in 1956 for the U.S. Army. Three of each model were built as prototypes. Neither of the variants was put into production.

The smaller ONR model used two 44 horsepower (33 kW) Nelson H-59 piston engines, coupled to the propellers by a modified helicopter transmission built by the Industrial Power Division of Hall-Scott. The larger Pawnee model used three of those engines and had an extended duct area. The Pawnee had ineffective "kinesthetic control" and instead had the operator seated on a platform controlling the flight with conventional helicopter controls.

== Testing and evaluation ==
Due to aerodynamic effects in the duct within which the propellers rotated, the platform was dynamically stable, even though the pilot and center of gravity of the platform were fairly high up. In testing, the prototypes flew well, but the U.S. Army judged them to be impractical as combat vehicles as they were small, limited in speed and only barely flew out of the ground cushion effect.

Two of the six prototypes are known to survive; both are ONR 1031-A-1 models. One is located at the Hiller Aviation Museum in San Carlos, California, the other is at the National Air and Space Museum's Udvar-Hazy Center in Chantilly, Virginia. The latter platform was formerly on loan to the Pima Air & Space Museum. A replica of the 1031 platform is on display at the Evergreen Aviation & Space Museum.

== Gallery ==
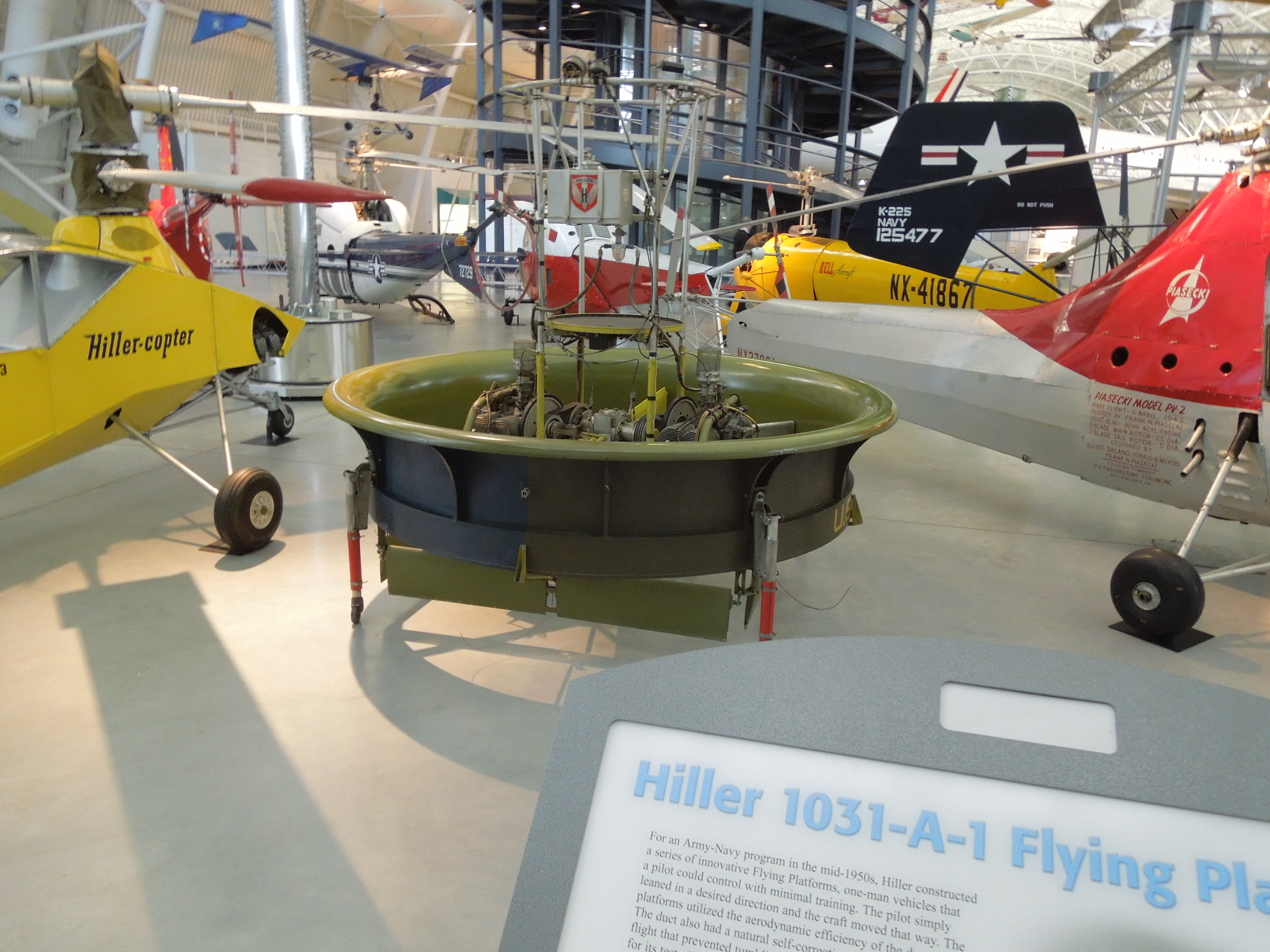
Hiller 1031-A-1 at Udvar-Hazy Center

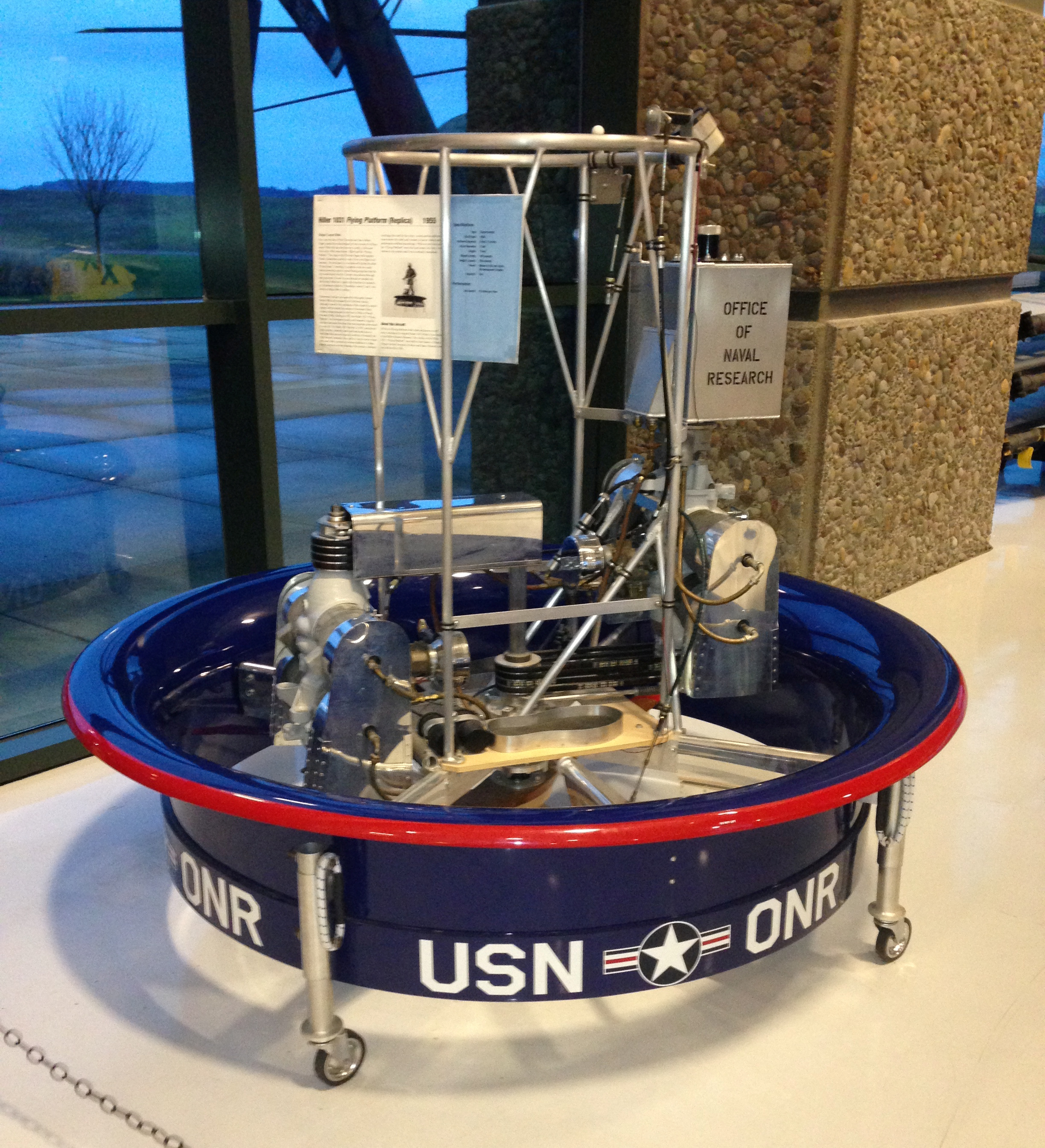
Reproduction of the Hiller 1031 Flying Platform, built by Ken Spence of Bend, Oregon in 2006.

Placard describing the reproduction of the Hiller 1031 on display at the Evergreen Aircraft Museum.

== Specifications (Model 1031-A-1) ==
Data from National Air and Space Museum and Hall-Scott Motor Company

General characteristics

- Crew: 1
- Capacity: 185 lb (84 kg) payload
- Diameter: 8 ft 4 in (2.54 m)
- Height: 7 ft (2.1 m)
- Empty weight: 370 lb (168 kg)
- Max takeoff weight: 555 lb (252 kg)
- Powerplant: 3 × Nelson H-59 4-cylinder air-cooled horizontally-opposed piston engines, 40 hp (30 kW) each at 4,000 rpm
- Transmission: Hall-Scott helicopter variant
- Main rotor diameter: 2 × 7 ft (2.1 m)
- Main rotor area: 76.98 sq ft (7.152 m^{2}) 2 × contra-rotating two-bladed aluminum

Performance

- Maximum speed: 16 mph (26 km/h, 14 kn)
- Service ceiling: 32.8 ft (10.0 m)

== See also ==
- Williams X-Jet – Single-person lightweight aircraft

Aircraft of comparable role, configuration, and era

- Bensen B-10 – 1950s American experimental VTOL aircraft by Igor Bensen
- De Lackner HZ-1 Aerocycle – 1954 experimental personal helicopter model by de Lackner Helicopters

Related lists

- List of military aircraft of the United States
- List of single seat helicopters
