= AGM-136 Tacit Rainbow =

AGM-136A
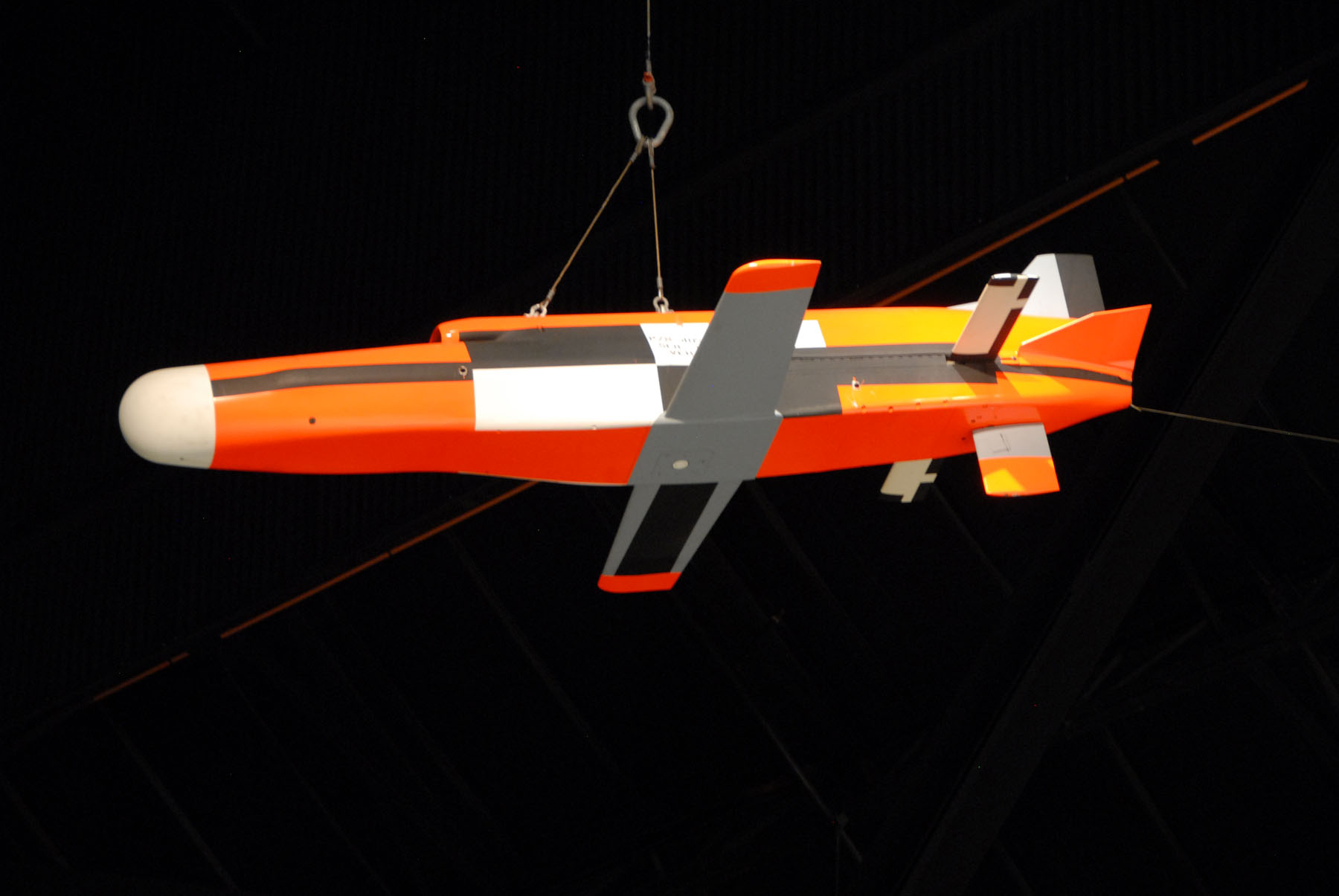
- A Northrop AGM-136A Tacit Rainbow in the Cold War Gallery at the National Museum of the U.S. Air Force in Dayton, Ohio
- Type: Anti-radiation missile
- Place of origin: United States

Production history
- Designer: Northrop, Texas Instruments and Boeing
- Designed: 1982 to 1991

Specifications
- Mass: 431 pounds (195 kg)

The AGM-136A Tacit Rainbow was a United States military anti-radiation missile program that was active from 1982 to 1991.

The requirement was for a low-cost air-launchable system to aid in the destruction of enemy air defense networks. The proposed unit would combine elements of cruise missiles and UAVs, it would be launched in large numbers by heavy bombers, fighters, or possibly mass ground launch systems.

The missiles would fly in advance of crewed aircraft up to 450 km (280 mi) to pre-programmed target zones and patrol there until enemy radar sources were detected which would then be destroyed, acting as a loitering munition. This extended patrol time on target ("loiter time") was the key feature of the new system, a persistent anti-radiation missile (PARM) as opposed to a HARM. This would allow for the threatening suppressive effects that HARMs have for significantly longer times, allowing friendly aircraft to operate in the area with a higher degree of safety for a longer time.

The project was started by the DoD in 1982, but moved to the control of the USAF Aeronautical Systems Division in 1984 as a joint Navy/Air Force project. The majority of the system was designed and developed by Northrop with Texas Instruments providing the seek head and Boeing providing a system that allowed it to be launched from B-52 bombers. The first test air-launch was on July 30, 1984.

The unit was 8 ft 4 in (2.54 m) long and 5 ft 2 in (1.57 m) in span with a body diameter of 27 inches (690 mm), flight and control surfaces deployed after launch. It weighed around 431 pounds (195 kg) including the 40-pound (18 kg) warhead. Power was provided by a Williams F121 turbofan, producing 310 N (70 lb_{f}) of thrust from the 0.9 m (35 in), 22 kg (49 lb) unit.

Some sources state that production units would have used a 1,200 N (270 lb_{f}) variant of the Williams International WR-24. While achieved speed and range are uncertain, low subsonic speed flight was probable and all sources indicate a range much lower than the hoped-for 450 km (280 mi). Each unit was to cost around $200,000, up to thirty would have been loaded in a single B-52.

The Naval Research Advisory Committee reported in 1989 that the project was not progressing well. In 1991 a DoD audit found numerous management problems. The program was canceled in 1991 (FY 1992), without any production units and at a total cost of around $4 billion. It was only the second post-Vietnam military project to be canceled after completing testing but before production.

== Survivors ==
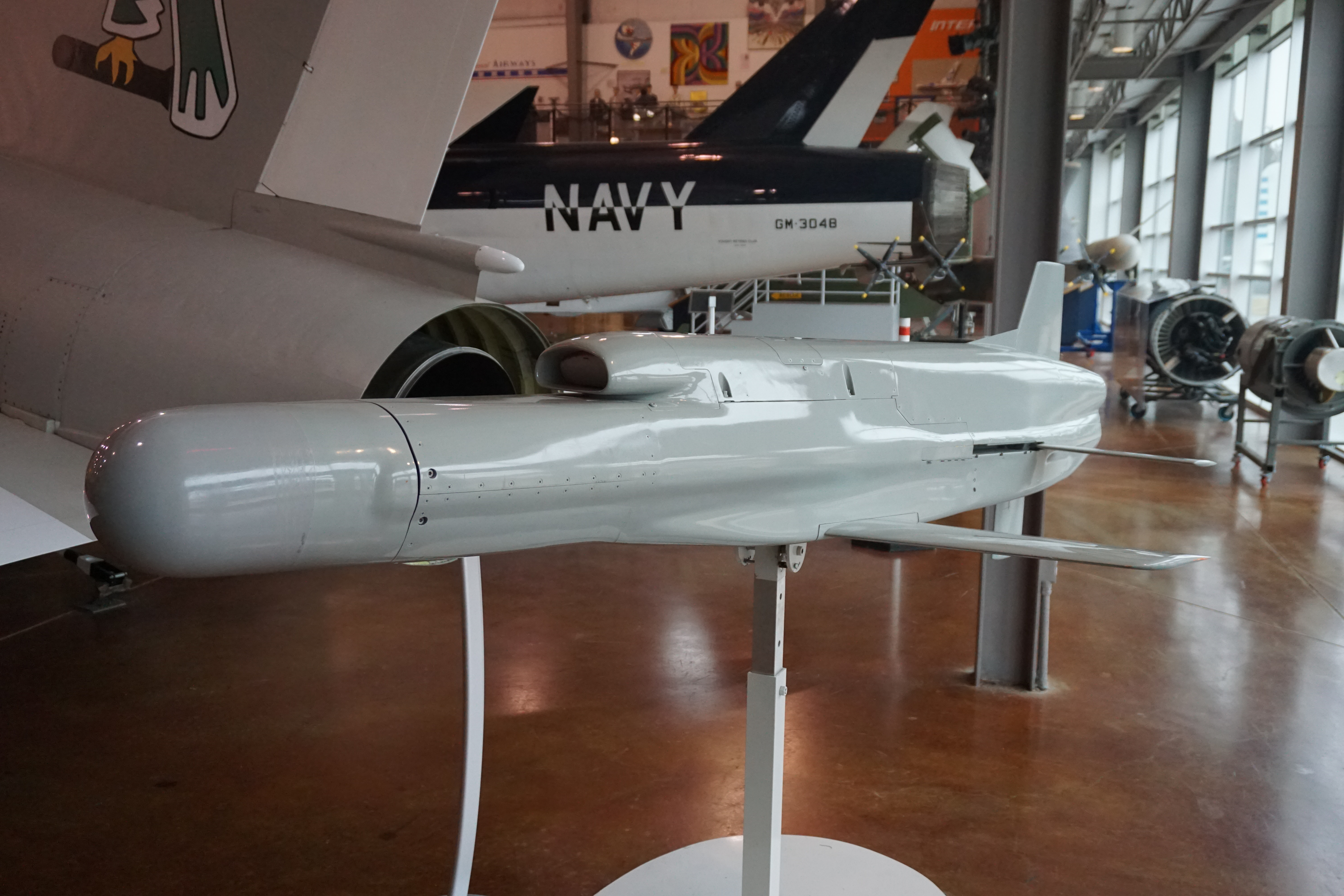
An AGM-136 Tacit Rainbow on display at the Frontiers of Flight Museum

Below is a list of museums which have a Tacit Rainbow in their collection:

- Museum of Aviation, Robins Air Force Base, Georgia
- National Museum of the United States Air Force, Wright-Patterson Air Force Base, Ohio
- U.S. Naval Museum of Armament & Technology, NAWS China Lake, California
