= Canadair CL-89 =

Canadian surveillance drone

CL-89
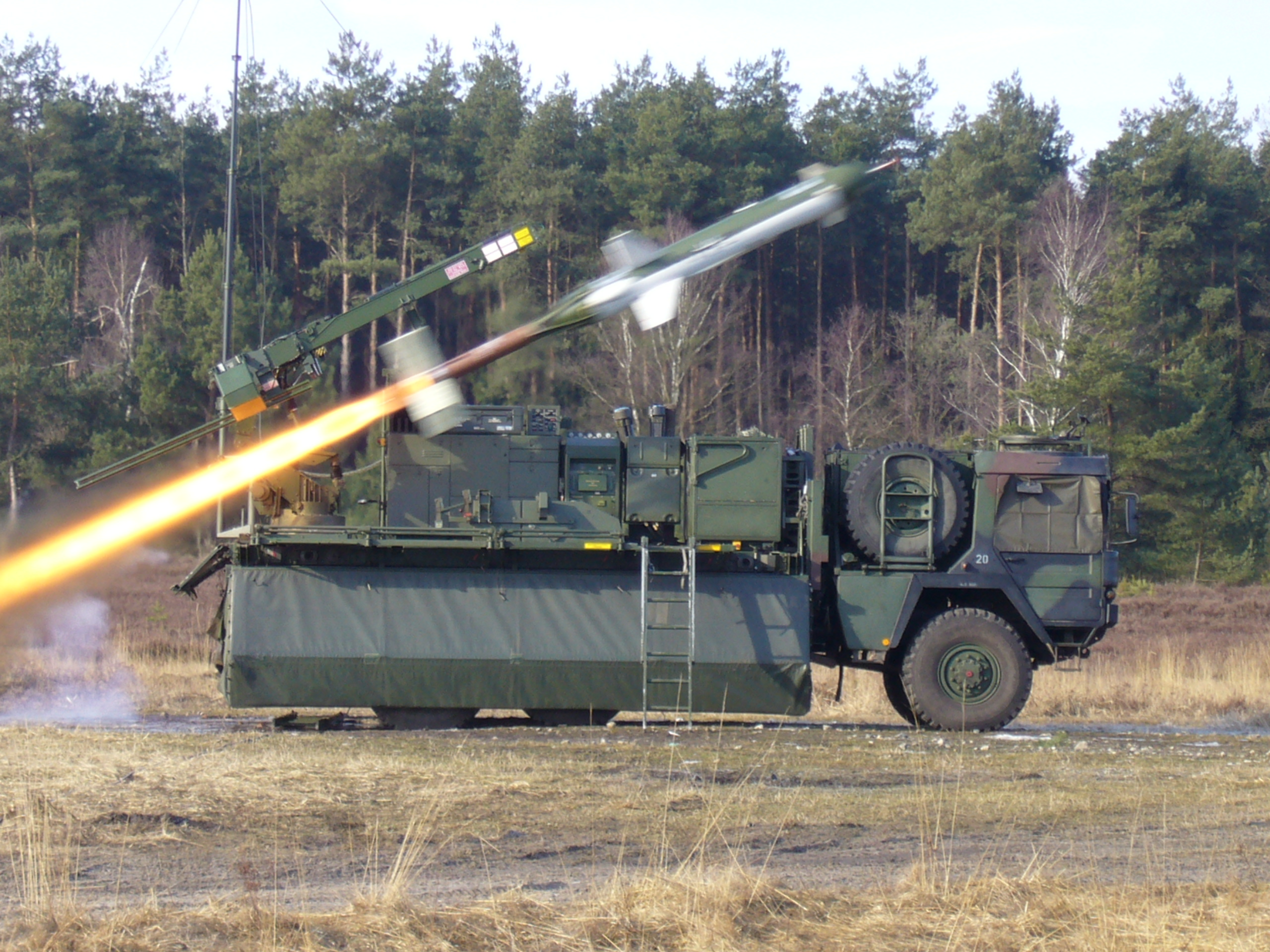
- A German Army CL-289

General information
- Type: Surveillance drone
- National origin: Canada
- Manufacturer: Canadair

History
- First flight: March 1964

The Canadair CL-89 was a surveillance drone (UAV) produced jointly by Canada, Britain and West Germany in the 1960s. A larger and improved model with a greater payload, the CL-289, was later introduced.

== History ==
=== CL-89 ===
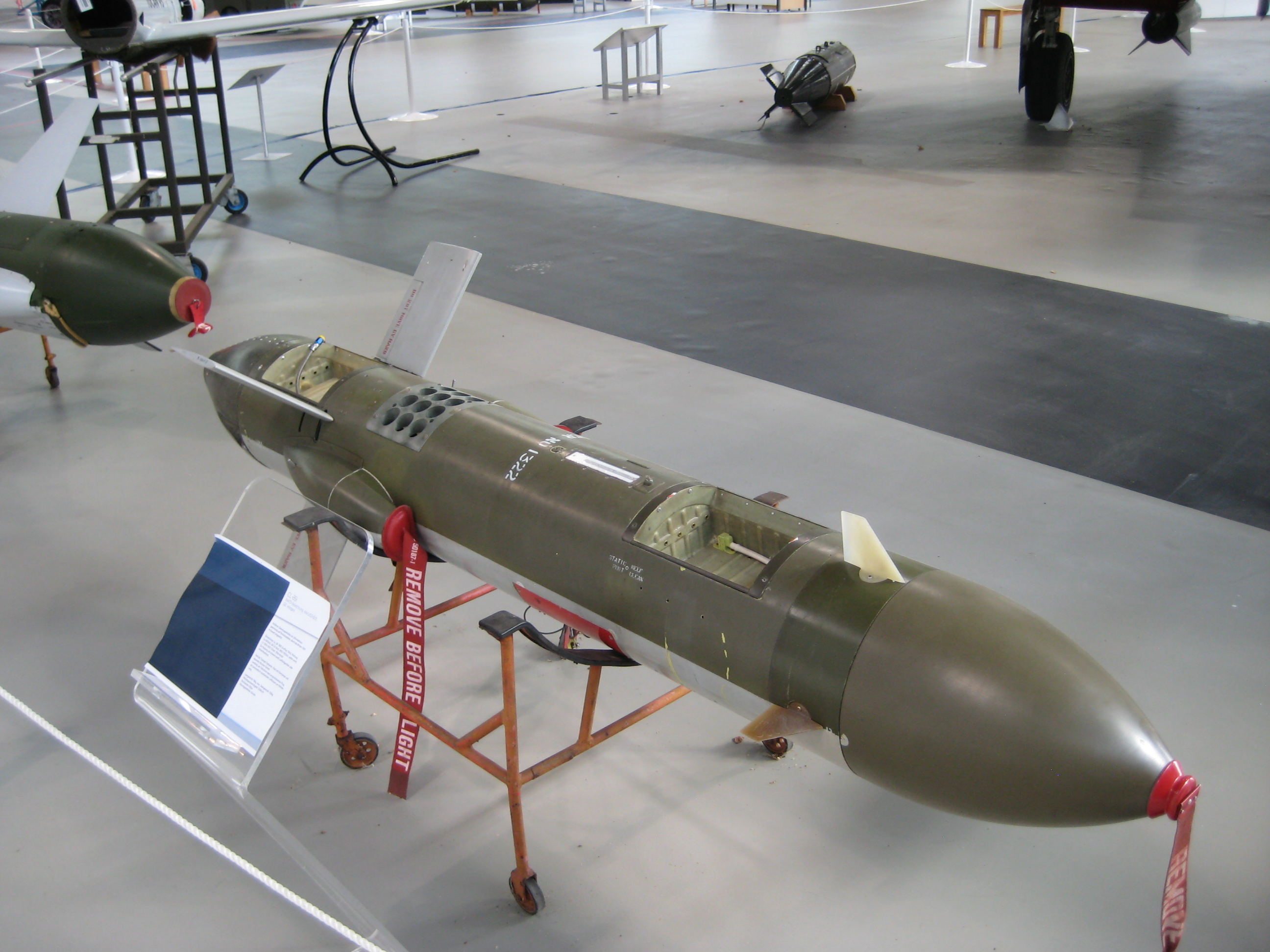
CL-89 NATO AN/USD-501

In June 1963, a sponsorship by Canada and Britain agreed to have Canadair design, evaluate and test the CL-89 drone. The concept had been developed at Canadair from the CL-85, a study for the carriage of dispatches. West Germany later joined the group, and although the United States was invited to join, they declined.

The first, less than successful flight was made at Yuma, Arizona in March 1964. The British wanted changes in the system (consisting of the drone, the launcher, the retrieval equipment and the support) to be "Soldier Proof". They sent an army officer to Canadair and with his help set up a maintenance advisory group which had excellent results. CL-89 had a difficult development and was almost abandoned.

The first complete CL-89 system was supplied to the West Germans in 1969. During the 1970s, Both France and Italy joined the British and West Germans in operating the CL-89. NATO gave the entire system the designation AN/USD-501 (Army Navy Unmanned Surveillance Drone type 501); in UK service it was known as the Midge (Military Intelligence & Data Gathering Equipment). The system was designed for information collecting at a divisional level.

In Royal Artillery service Midge was operated by a troop in a divisional locating battery. This troop had two launchers, all the facilities for processing and analysing imagery and for repair and servicing of the aircraft. The troop comprised two officers and about 70 soldiers. Tasking was through the artillery intelligence cell at divisional HQ and the primary use was to confirm suspected enemy locations, particularly hostile artillery. In UK service Midge replaced the Northrop Radioplane SD-1, known in service as "Observer", and was replaced in turn by Phoenix. Midge was used operationally in Kuwait in 1991, with some effect especially when combined with artillery raids.

In German Army service, CL-89 was operated by a battery in the divisional observation battalion. The organisation was similar to the British but had six officers and about 120 soldiers.

Logistic support for CL-89 was provided to user nations through NAMSA.

=== CL-289 ===
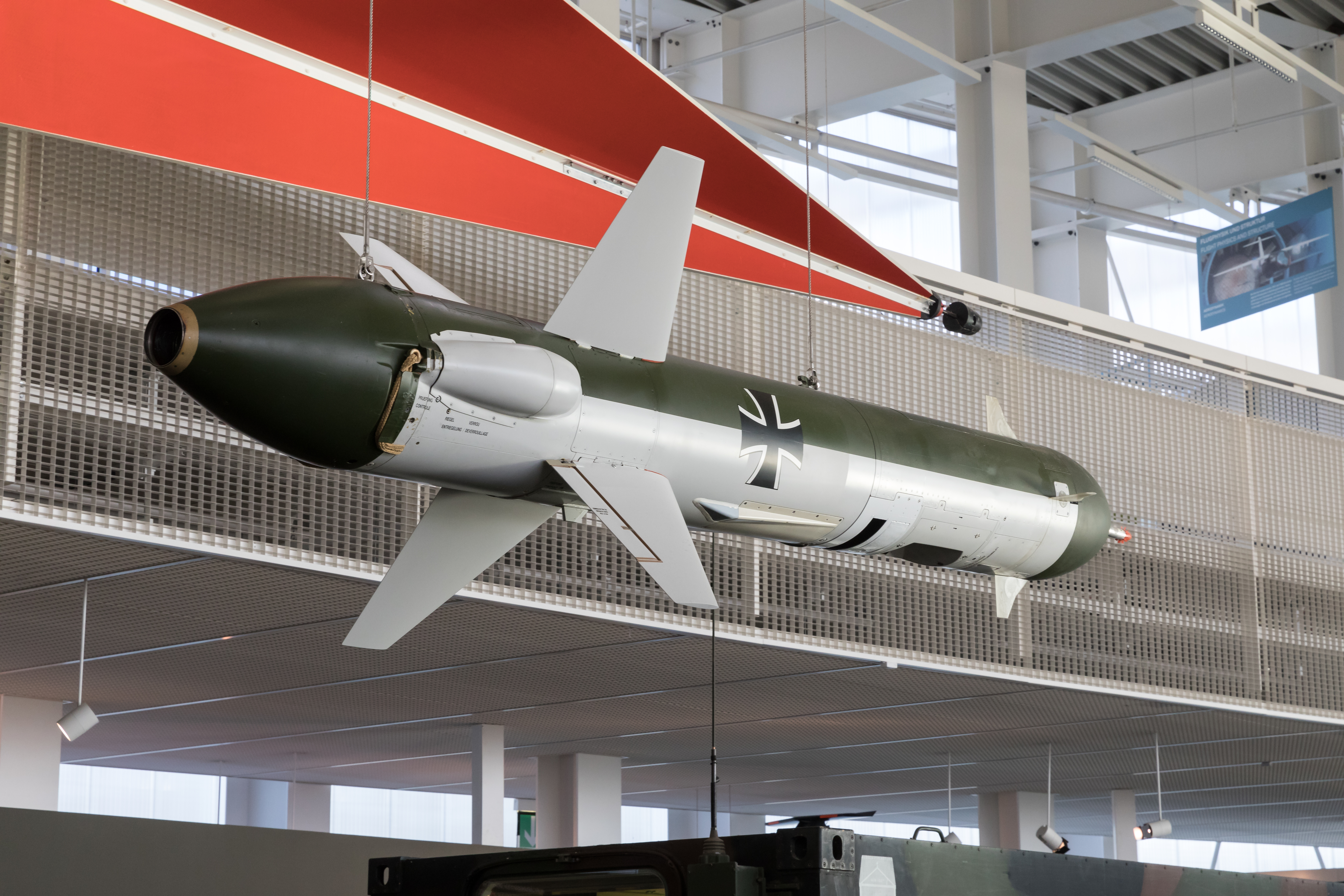
CL-289 NATO AN/USD-502

In November 1987, an agreement was signed between Canada, West Germany and France for the production of the CL-289 system. The design of this was started in 1974. It was a larger drone with better range and payload than the CL-89. It was intended to obtain corps level intelligence for the armies of NATO. Although similar in appearance to the CL-89, many changes in design were necessary. The CL-289 entered service in November 1990, the entire system being designated AN/USD-502. At least 9 CL-289 were shot down by the Yugoslav Army during the NATO bombing of Yugoslavia in 1999.

== Description ==
The cylindrical body had four stub-wings at the rear of the fuselage, with aerodynamic trim provided by smaller canard foreplanes.

Although the drone looked and flew like a missile and was launched from truck-mounted rails, it cruised under jet power. Takeoff was achieved by a booster rocket, which was jettisoned when flight speed was attained. A small turbojet then took over for the rest of the flight

The flight pattern was programmed and allowed for the flight to the target areas, a run while the cameras or sensors recorded, and the return to the recovery site. On arrival at this calculated position, the motor cut and a drogue parachute was deployed. This slowed the drone down sufficiently to alter its attitude and allow a parachute to be released from the underside of the drone causing it to invert. Before reaching the ground a pair of pneumatic landing bags were released from the top of the drone (now facing the ground). The retrieval crew would then remove the cameras etc., and return the drone to be ready for its next flight. A camera or sensor, dependent on the mission, could be fitted to the CL-89, and multiple units to the CL-289.

Being a drone meant that it flew a programmed course and was not under any form of external control. In the CL-89 the programmed flight path was constrained by the very limited number of 'events' that could be programmed. These events including turns, changes in altitude, sensor activations/de-activations and landing. The programmed flightpath had to be corrected for meteorological conditions. Data for this was provided by a standard artillery Target Acquisition meteor message.

Two types of sensors were used with the CL-89, both using photographic film that was processed and analysed after the drone was recovered. Standard black and white film was normally used in daylight, with flares available for night use. Infrared linescan, an early form of thermal imaging was generally used at night. Three types of sensors were used with the British Drone Troops, Vinten (day sensor), Zeiss (day and night) and IRLS (day and night).

== Operators ==
Canada

- Canadian Army

France

- French Army

Germany

- German Army (replaced by Rheinmetall KZO)

Italy

- Italian Army

Turkey

- Turkish Army

United Kingdom

- British Army

== Specifications ==
Data from Jane's All the World's Aircraft 1982-83

General characteristics

- Length: 12 ft 2 in (3.71 m) (with booster)
- Wingspan: 3 ft 1 in (0.94 m)
- Diameter: 1 ft 1 in (0.33 m) (body diameter)
- Empty weight: 172.4 lb (78 kg)
- Max takeoff weight: 343 lb (156 kg) (with booster)
- Powerplant: 1 × Williams International WR2-6 turbojet, 125 lbf (0.56 kN) thrust
- Powerplant: 1 × BAJ Vickers Wagtail rocket booster, 5,000 lbf (22 kN) thrust

Performance

- Maximum speed: 460 mph (740 km/h, 400 kn)
- Range: 37 mi (60 km, 32 nmi)
- Service ceiling: 10,000 ft (3,000 m)

== See also ==
- Joint Electronics Type Designation System – Unclassified designation system for United States military electronic equipment
- List of military electronics of the United States
- List of missiles

== Bibliography ==
- Picker & Milberry, Canadair - The First 50 Years, CANAV ISBN 0-921022-07-7
- Taylor, John W. R. Jane's All The World's Aircraft 1982–83. London: Jane's Yearbooks, 1982. ISBN 0-7106-0748-2.
