= Williams X-Jet =

Single-person lightweight aircraft

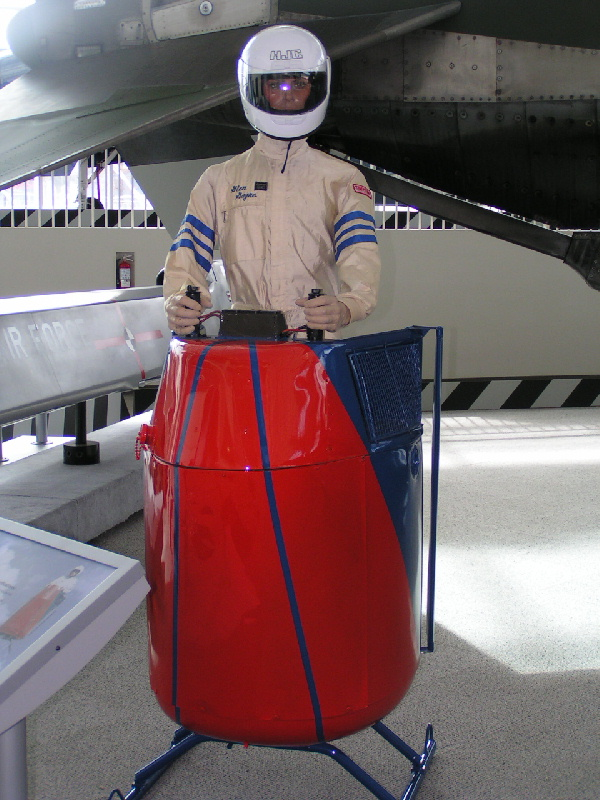
One of the three original proof-of-concept prototypes of the Williams X-Jet, on display at the Seattle Museum of Flight.

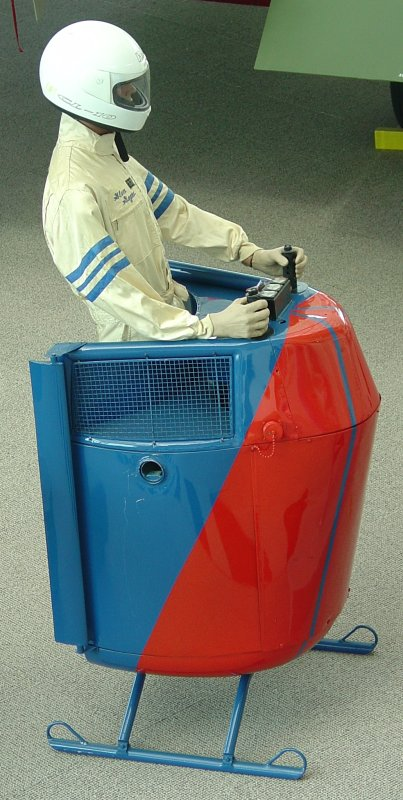
X-Jet viewed from the side

The Williams X-Jet, created by Williams International, is a small, single-person, light-weight, Vertical Take Off and Landing (VTOL) aircraft powered by a modified Williams F107 turbofan aircraft engine — designated WR-19-7 — after some minor modifications. The vehicle was nicknamed "The Flying Pulpit" for its shape. It was designed to carry one operator and to be controlled by leaning in the direction of desired travel and by modulating engine output power. It could move in any direction, accelerate rapidly, hover and rotate on its axis, stay aloft for up to 45 minutes and travel at speeds up to 60 miles per hour (97 km/h). It was evaluated by the United States Army in the 1980s, but was deemed inferior to the capabilities of helicopters and small, uncrewed aircraft, and so the development of the X-Jet was discontinued.

Other VTOL systems developed by Williams International included a jet-powered flying belt, developed in 1969, which was powered by a Williams WR19 turbofan, and X-Jet's predecessor, the WASP I (Williams Aerial Systems Platform), which was developed in the 1970s and was powered by the more powerful WR19-9 BRP5, rated at 670 lbf (2.98 kN) thrust and a specific fuel consumption of 0.47 lb/lbf·h (13.31 g/kN·s).

U.S. patent 4,447,024 was issued for the Williams X-Jet. Technical information and drawings are available at the United States Patent and Trademark Office. The WASP II uses a slightly modified and derated version of the WR-19-A7D, yielding 600 lbf thrust from its micro turbofan engine and is designated WR19-7, rated at 570 lbf thrust, after minor modifications and said derating. Modifications to the WR-19-A7D included accessories — replacement of pyro starter with electric/air start — and exhaust system modifications. No internal modifications to the counter-rotating micro turbofans were performed. The first crewed, untethered flight was conducted in April 1980. Ray Le Grande is one of the WASP II operators trained by Williams International to fly the X-Jet.

The Williams X-Jet was on loaned display at the Museum of Flight in Seattle, Washington, but was returned to Williams International in mid-2018.

== Specifications (X-Jet) ==
Data from

General characteristics

- Crew: 1
- Length: 3 ft (0.91 m) approx.
- Height: 4 ft 0 in (1.22 m)
- Empty weight: 401 lb (182 kg)
- Gross weight: 550 lb (249 kg)
- Powerplant: 1 × Williams F107 turbofan engine, 570 lbf (2.5 kN) thrust (modified)

Performance

- Maximum speed: 52 kn (60 mph, 96 km/h)
- Endurance: 30–45 minutes
- Service ceiling: 10,000 ft (3,000 m)
- Thrust/weight: 1.11

== See also ==
Aircraft of comparable role, configuration, and era

- Hiller VZ-1 Pawnee – 1950s experimental American flying platform
