= List of aircraft (H–He) =

This is a list of aircraft in alphabetical order beginning with 'H', up to those starting with 'He'.

== H–He ==
=== Hackel ===
(Yakov Modestovich Gakkel)

- Hackel I 1909
- Hackel I
- Hackel II
- Hackel III
- Hackel IV
- Hackel V
- Hackel VI
- Hackel VII
- Hackel VIII
- Hackel IX

=== Hackenberger ===
(A L Hackenberger, San Antonio, TX, 1938: Las Vegas, NV)

- Hackenberger 1A
- Hackenberger H

=== Hadley & Blood ===
(C O Hadley, Mineola, NY)

- Hadley & Blood 1911 Biplane

=== Hærens Flyvemaskinfabrikk ===
(Hærens Flyvemaskinfabrikk – Navy aircraft factory)

- Hærens Flyvemaskinfabrikk FF.1 (based on Farman biplanes seen by Einar Sem-Jacobsen)
- Hærens Flyvemaskinfabrikk FF.2 (Based on FF.1)
- Hærens Flyvemaskinfabrikk FF.3 Hydro Based on Farman F.40
- Hærens Flyvemaskinfabrikk FF.4
- Hærens Flyvemaskinfabrikk FF.5 (T.1)
- Hærens Flyvemaskinfabrikk FF.6 (T.2)
- Hærens Flyvemaskinfabrikk FF.7 Hauk Hannoversche Waggonfabrik's CL.V built under licence
- Hærens Flyvemaskinfabrikk FF.8 Måke Hansa-Brandenburg W.29 built under licence
- Hærens Flyvemaskinfabrikk FF.9 Kaje

=== Haeco ===
(Robert Hatfield, Imperial, CA)

- Haeco Hornet

=== Haessler ===
(Helmut Haessler / Haessler-Villinger)

- Haessler-Villinger H.V.1
- Haessler H3

=== Häfeli ===
(August Häfeli)

- Häfeli DH-1
- Häfeli DH-2
- Häfeli DH-3
- Häfeli DH-4
- Häfeli DH-5
- Militär-Apparat MA-7

=== Hafner ===
(Raoul Hafner)

- Hafner-Rath HR-1 Gelse (with Josef Rath)
- Hafner R.I
- Hafner R.II
- Hafner A.R.III Gyroplane
- Hafner A.R.IV Gyroplane
- Hafner A.R.V Gyroplane
- Hafner PD.6
- Hafner H.8 Rotachute
- Hafner Rotabuggy

=== Hagiwara ===
(Hisao Hagiwara / Jiyu Koku Kenkyusho (Liberty Aeronautical Research Institute))

- Hagiwara JHX-1
- Hagiwara JHX-2
- Hagiwara JHX-3
- Hagiwara JHX-4

=== Hagness ===
(Ernest Hagness, Portland, TX)

- Hagness Hokey Pokey#1

=== HAI ===
(Hellenic Aerospace Industry)

- HAI Pegasus

=== Haig ===
(Joseph Haig)

- Haig 1986 Monoplane

=== Haig ===
(Larry Haig)

- Haig Minibat

=== Haig-K ===
(Haig-K Aircraft Corp, Swedsford Rd, Paoli, PA)

- Haig-K HK-1

=== Haigh ===
(Henry Haigh, Howell, MI)

- Haigh Super Star

=== Haim ===
(Haim Aviation Inc.)

- Haim Sam LS

=== Haines ===
(Frank J Haines, Daytona Beach, FL and Detroit, MI)

- Haines H-2
- Haines H-3 Firefly
- Haines Low-Wing

=== HAL ===
- HAL Tejas
- HAL HF-24 Marut
- HAL Basant
- HAL HF-73
- HAL Ajeet
- HAL Tejas Mk2
- HAL AMCA
- HAL TEDBF
- HAL Dhruv
- HAL Rudra
- HAL Light Combat Helicopter
- HAL Light Utility Helicopter
- HAL IMRH
- HAL HT-2
- HAL HPT-32 Deepak
- HAL HJT-16 Kiran
- HAL HTT-35
- HAL HJT-36 Sitara
- HAL HTT-40
- HAL HJT 39
- HAL Krishak
- HAL/NAL Regional Transport Aircraft
- HAL Saras
- HAL Pushpak

=== Halberstadt ===
(Halberstädter Flugzeug-Werke G.m.b.H.)

- Halberstadt B.I
- Halberstadt B.II
- Halberstadt B.III
- Halberstadt C.I
- Halberstadt C.III
- Halberstadt C.V
- Halberstadt C.VII
- Halberstadt C.VIII
- Halberstadt C.IX
- Halberstadt CL.II
- Halberstadt CL.IV
- Halberstadt CLS.I
- Halberstadt D.I
- Halberstadt D.II
- Halberstadt D.III
- Halberstadt D.IV
- Halberstadt D.V
- Halberstadt G.I
- Halberstadt A15
- Halberstadt B15

=== Halbronn ===
(Robert Halbronn & Todd)

- Halbronn H.T.1 a.k.a. Labourdette-Halbron
- Halbronn H.T.2

=== Hales ===
(Hales Aircraft, Oklahoma City, OK)

- Hales 1932 Monoplane
- Hales 1933 Monoplane
- Hales 102

=== Hall ===
(Ernest C Hall, Warren, OH)

- Hall 1911 Monoplane

=== Hall ===
(Robert P Hall, Searchlight, NV)

- Hall 1911 Monoplane

=== Hall ===
(Hall Aeroplane Company (Charles S Hall), 807 North Spring St, Los Angeles, CA)

- Hall Helicopter Aeroplane

=== Hall ===
(Robert "Bert" Hall & Porter Roberts, Lindsay, OK)

- Hall A

=== Hall ===
(Theodore P Hall Engr Corp, Spreckels Bldg, San Diego, CA)

- Hall 118 flying Auto
- Hall XCP-1

=== Hall/Hall-Springfield ===
(Springfield Aircraft Inc (Fdr: Robert L Hall), Springfield, MA)

- Hall Bulldog
- Hall Cicada

=== Hall Aluminium ===
(Charles Ward Hall Inc, Mamaroneck, NY, 1927: Hall Aluminum Aircraft Corp, Buffalo, NY)

- Hall Aluminium Air Yacht
- Hall Aluminium Monoped
- Hall XFH
- Hall PH
- Hall XP2H
- Hall XPTBH

=== Halladay ===
(C L Halladay, Jackson, MI)

- Halladay 1911 pusher
- Halladay 1911 Racer
- Halladay 1915 Flying Boar

=== Hallas ===
(Charles Hallas, Northville, MN)

- Hallas 1929 Monoplane

=== Haller ===
(Rudolf Haller)

- Haller Ha 6
- Haller Ha 22
- Haller Ha 23

=== Haller ===
(Oldřich haller)

- Haller H-8
- Haller H-9
- Haller H-11

=== Halligan ===
(Russel and Francis Halligan, Beardstown, IL)

- Halligan 1923 Helicopter

=== Hallock ===
(Bruce Hallock, Austin, TX)

- Hallock Road Wing (a.k.a. HT-1)
- Hallock Pterodactyl

=== Halpin ===
((Thomas E) Halpin Development Co, Lunken Airport, Cincinnati, OH)

- Halpin Flamingo

=== Halpin-Huf ===
(Richard Halpin and Tom Huf)

- H&H Fun Special

=== Halsmer ===
(Joseph L Halsmer, Lafayette, IN)

- Halsmer Aero Car 3
- Halsmer Safety Twin

=== Halsted ===
{Barry Halsted} (Barry Halsted, Fountain Valley, CA)

- Halsted BH-1 Saffire

=== Halton ===
(Halton Aero Club)

- Halton HAC.1 Mayfly
- Halton HAC.2 Minus
- Halton HAC.3 Meteor

=== Hamao ===
(T Hamao)

- Hamao Siakara Tombo

=== Hamble River, Luke & Co Limited ===
- Hamble River H.L.1 Seaplane

=== Hamburger Flugzeugbau ===
- Hamburger Flugzeugbau Ha 135
- Hamburger Flugzeugbau Ha 136
- Hamburger Flugzeugbau Ha 137
- Hamburger Flugzeugbau Ha 138
- Hamburger Flugzeugbau Ha 139
- Hamburger Flugzeugbau Ha 140
- Hamburger Flugzeugbau Ha 141
- Hamburger Flugzeugbau Ha 142

=== Hamilton ===
(Charles K Hamilton, Mineola, NY)

- Hamilton Hamiltonian

=== Hamilton ===
- Hamilton 1910 Aeroplane
- Hamilton 1911 Aeroplane
- Hamilton 1912 Tractor Biplane
- Hamilton 1913 Biplane
- Hamilton 1915 Flying Boat
- Hamilton 1915 Aeroplane (Curtiss copy)
- Hamilton 1916 Tractor Biplane
- Hamilton H-18
- Hamilton H-19 Silver Eagle
- Hamilton H-20 Silver Swan
- Hamilton H-21
- Hamilton H-22 Silver Sea-dan
- Hamilton H-23
- Hamilton H-43
- Hamilton H-45
- Hamilton H-47 (a.k.a. Special)
- Hamilton C-89

=== Hamilton ===
(J W Hamilton, Mineola, NY)

- Hamilton 1911 Monoplane

=== Hamilton ===
(Hamilton Helicopter Co, Baltimore, MD)

- Hamilton 1949 Helicopter

=== Hamilton ===
((Gordon B) Hamilton Aircraft Co Inc, Tucson, AZ)

- Hamilton HA-1 (conv. of TC-45J N28471)
- Hamilton Little Liner (Beech18/C-45 Conv.s)
- Hamilton T-28R Nomair (T-28 conversions)
- Hamilton Westwind (Beech 18 turboprop conversions)

=== Hamilton ===
(Hamilton Aerospace. San Antonio, TX)

- Hamilton H-1
- Hamilton HX-321
- Hamilton HXT-2

=== Hamilton ===
(Tom Hamilton)

- Hamilton Glasair

=== Hammer ===
(Russell Hammer, Indianapolis, IN)

- Hammer ANZ-3

=== Hammer-Hunt ===
(Altitude Unlimited Inc (Bob Hammer & Dick Hunt), Paine Field, WA)

- Hammer-Hunt HH-1 Zipper

=== Hammond ===
((Dean B) Hammond Aircraft Corp, Ann Arbor, MI)

- Hammond 100
- Hammond Y
- Stearman-Hammond Y-125

=== Hampton ===
(Hampton Engr Co (Arnold & David Biermann, engrs at NACA), 310 Marshall St, Hampton, VA)

- Hampton 1930 Monoplane

=== Hancock ===
(Allan Hancock Foundation (College), Santa Maria, CA)

- Hancock Cadet

=== Handasyde ===
(Handasyde Aircraft Company, United Kingdom)

- Handasyde H.2
- Handasyde Monoplane
- Handasyde glider

=== H&E Paramotores ===
(Madrid, Spain)

- H&E Paramotores Corsario
- H&E Paramotores Simonini
- H&E Paramotores Solo
- H&E Paramotores Ziklon

=== Hand-Hoffman ===
(Edgar Hand & Jack Hoffman, Susalito, CA)

- Hand-Hoffman 1908 Monoplane

=== Handley ===
(Wayne Handley, Greenfield, CA)

- Handley Raven T

=== Handley Page ===
- Handley Page Type A – monoplane (1910) (HP.1)
- Handley Page Type B – biplane (HP.2)
- Handley Page Type D – monoplane (1911) (HP.4)
- Handley Page Type E – monoplane (HP.5)
- Handley Page Type F – monoplane (HP.6)
- Handley Page Type G – biplane (HP.7)
- Handley Page Type L – biplane – never flew (HP.8)
- Handley Page HP.14 –
- Handley Page Type O – twin-engined bomber (HP.16)
  - Handley Page O/7 bomber
  - Handley Page O/10 airliner
  - Handley Page O/11 airliner
  - Handley Page O/100
  - Handley Page O/400
- Handley Page Type S
- Handley Page Type T
- Handley Page Type Ta
- Handley Page V/1500
- Handley Page Type W airliner
  - Handley Page W.8
  - Handley Page W.9
  - Handley Page W/400 airliner
- Handley Page HP.18
- Handley Page HP.19 Hanley
- Handley Page HP.22
- Handley Page HP.23
- Handley Page HP.24 Hyderabad
- Handley Page HP.25 Hendon
- Handley Page HP.26 Hamilton
- Handley Page HP.27 Hampstead
- Handley Page HP.28 Handcross
- Handley Page HP.30
- Handley Page HP.31 Harrow
- Handley Page HP.32 Hamlet
- Handley Page HP.33 Hinaidi I
- Handley Page HP.34 Hare
- Handley Page HP.35 Clive
- Handley Page HP.36 Hinaidi II
- Handley Page HP.38 Heyford prototype
- Handley Page HP.39 Gugnunc
- Handley Page HP.42 ("HP.42E" – Eastern)
- Handley Page HP.43
- Handley Page HP.45 ("HP.42W" – Western)
- Handley Page HP.50 Heyford production
- Handley Page HP.51
- Handley Page HP.52 Hampden
- Handley Page HP.53 Hereford
- Handley Page HP.54 Harrow
- Handley Page HP.57 Halifax
  - Handley Page HP.57 Halifax B Mk.I
  - Handley Page HP.59 Halifax B Mk.II
  - Handley Page HP.61 Halifax B Mk.III
  - Handley Page HP.63 Halifax B Mk.V
  - Handley Page HP.70 Halifax C Mk.VIII
  - Handley Page HP.71 Halifax A Mk.IX
- Handley Page HP.67 Hastings C Mk.1
  - Handley Page HP.94 Hastings C Mk.4
  - Handley Page HP.95 Hastings C Mk.3
- Handley Page HP.68 Hermes 1
  - Handley Page HP.74 Hermes 2
  - Handley Page HP.81 Hermes 4
  - Handley Page HP.82 Hermes 5
- Handley Page HP.70 Halton
- Handley Page HP.75 Manx
- Handley Page HP.80 Victor
- Handley Page HP.87
- Handley Page HP.88
- Handley Page HP.100
- Handley Page HP.113
- Handley Page HP.115
- Handley Page HP.137 Jetstream

=== Handley Page (Reading) ===
Formed from assets of Miles Aircraft

- Handley Page HPR.1 Marathon – airliner developed by Miles
- Handley Page HPR.2 Basic Trainer – basic trainer
- Handley Page HPR.3 Herald – prototype for Dart Herald airliner
- Handley Page HPR.5 Marathon – Miles M.69 Marathon II used engine test bed
- Handley Page HPR.7 Dart Herald – airliner

=== Hanes ===
(Arnold Hanes, Los Angeles, CA)

- Hanes H-1 Hornet

=== Hanken ===
(William B Hanken, Monticello, IA)

- Hanken HDT-681

=== Hannaford ===
- Hannaford Bee

=== Hannover ===
(Hannoversche Waggonfabrik A.G.)

- Hannover C.I
- Hannover CL.II
- Hannover CL.III
- Hannover CL.IV
- Hannover CL.V
- Hannover F.3
- Hannover F.10

=== Hanriot ===
- (René Hanriot / The Monoplans Hanriot Company Ltd / Aéroplanes Hanriot et Cie)
- (Designations;Hanriot-Dupont:HD – 1916 to 1930; Lorraine-Hanriot:LH – 1930 to 1933; 1933 onward reverted to H (those LH still in use or production were re-designated).)
- Hanriot 1907 Monoplane
- Hanriot 1909 monoplane
- Hanriot 1910 Type-1 Monoplane
- Hanriot 1910 Type-II Monoplane"Libellule" ("Dragonfly")
- Hanriot 1910 Type-III Monoplane
- Hanriot 1911 Type-IV Monoplane
- Hanriot 1912 Monoplane
- Hanriot HD.1
- Hanriot HD.2
- Hanriot HD.3
- Hanriot HD.3bis
- Hanriot HD.4
- Hanriot HD.5
- Hanriot HD.6
- Hanriot HD.7
- Hanriot HD.8
- Hanriot HD.9
- Hanriot HD.12
- Hanriot HD.14
- Hanriot HD.14S
- Hanriot HD.15
- Hanriot HD.17
- Hanriot HD.18
- Hanriot HD.19
- Hanriot HD.20
- Hanriot HD.22
- Hanriot HD.24
- Hanriot HD.27
- Hanriot HD.28
- Hanriot HD.29
- Hanriot HD.32
- Hanriot HD.40S
- Hanriot HD.41H
- Hanriot HD.54
- Hanriot HD.141
- Hanriot HD.320
- Hanriot HD.321
- Hanriot LH.10
- Hanriot LH.11
- Hanriot LH 11bis
- Hanriot LH.12
- Hanriot LH.13
- Hanriot LH.16
- Hanriot LH.21S
- Hanriot LH.30
- Hanriot LH.40
- Hanriot LH.41
- Hanriot LH.41.02
- Hanriot LH.42
- Hanriot LH.431
- Hanriot LH.50
- Hanriot LH.60
- Hanriot LH.61
- Hanriot LH.70
- Hanriot LH.80
- Hanriot LH.110
- Hanriot LH.130
- Hanriot LH.131-01
- Hanriot LH.131-02
- Hanriot LH.412
- Hanriot LH.431
- Hanriot LH.432
- Hanriot LH.433
- Hanriot LH.437
- Hanriot H.14CR
- Hanriot H.16
- Hanriot H.19 Et2
- Hanriot H.25T
- Hanriot H.26
- Hanriot H.29
- Hanriot H.31
- Hanriot H.33
- Hanriot H.34
- Hanriot H.35
- Hanriot H.36
- Hanriot H.38
- Hanriot H.41
- Hanriot H.43
- Hanriot H.46 Styx
- Hanriot H.110
- Hanriot H.110 (LH 110)
- Hanriot H.115
- Hanriot H.131-01
- Hanriot H.131-02
- Hanriot H.161
- Hanriot H.170
- Hanriot H.170M
- Hanriot H.171
- Hanriot H.172B
- Hanriot H.172N
- Hanriot H.173
- Hanriot H.174
- Hanriot H.175
- Hanriot H.180
- Hanriot H.180T
- Hanriot H.181
- Hanriot H.182
- Hanriot H.183
- Hanriot H.184
- Hanriot H.185
- Hanriot H.190M
- Hanriot H.191
- Hanriot H.192B
- Hanriot H.192N
- Hanriot H.195
- Hanriot H.220
- Hanriot H.230
- Hanriot H.231
- Hanriot H.232
- Hanriot H.410
- Hanriot H.411
- Hanriot H.436
- Hanriot H.438
- Hanriot H.439
- Hanriot H.461
- Hanriot H.462
- Hanriot H.463
- Hanriot H.464
- Hanriot H.465
- Hanriot H.510

=== Hansa-Brandenburg ===
(Hansa und Brandenburgische Flugzeug-Werke G.m.b.H.)

- Hansa-Brandenburg B.I
- Hansa-Brandenburg C.I
- Hansa-Brandenburg C.II
- Hansa-Brandenburg D.I
- Hansa-Brandenburg CC
- Hansa-Brandenburg D
- Hansa-Brandenburg DD
- Hansa-Brandenburg FB
- Hansa-Brandenburg FD
- Hansa-Brandenburg G.I
- Hansa-Brandenburg GDW
- Hansa-Brandenburg GF
- Hansa-Brandenburg GNW
- Hansa-Brandenburg GW
- Hansa-Brandenburg KD
- Hansa-Brandenburg K
- Hansa-Brandenburg KDD
- Hansa-Brandenburg KDW
- Hansa-Brandenburg L.14
- Hansa-Brandenburg L.16
- Hansa-Brandenburg LDD
- Hansa-Brandenburg NW
- Hansa-Brandenburg W
- Hansa-Brandenburg W.11
- Hansa-Brandenburg W.12
- Hansa-Brandenburg W.13
- Hansa-Brandenburg W.16
- Hansa-Brandenburg W.17
- Hansa-Brandenburg W.18
- Hansa-Brandenburg W.19
- Hansa-Brandenburg W.20
- Hansa-Brandenburg W.23
- Hansa-Brandenburg W.25
- Hansa-Brandenburg W.27
- Hansa-Brandenburg W.29
- Hansa-Brandenburg W.32
- Hansa-Brandenburg W.33
- Hansa-Brandenburg W.34
- Hansa-Brandenburg ZM

=== Hanseatische Flugzeug-Werke ===
- Caspar D.I

=== Hansen ===
(Perry D Hansen, Lansing, MI)

- Hansen Special

=== Hansen ===
(Willam Hansen)

- Hansen WH-1 Thunderchicken

=== Hansen-Loock ===
(Lorrin L Hansen & Rev Carl H Loock, Rapid City, SD)

- Hansen-Loock 1930 Dirigible

=== Hanson ===
(Carl L Hanson, Mercer Island, WA)

- Hanson Woodwind

=== Hants & Sussex ===
(Hants and Sussex Aviation Ltd.)

- Hants & Sussex Herald

=== Hanuschke ===
- Hanuschke Monoplane

=== HAPI ===
(HAPI Engines)

- HAPI SF2A Cygnet

=== HAPSMobile ===
- HAPSMobile Hawk30

=== Harbin (HAMC) ===
- Dongfeng-113
- Song Hua Jiang-1
- Heilongjiang-1 (Harbin Aviation Polytechnic School)
- Harbin model 701
- Harbin B-5
- Harbin H-5 license-built Ilyushin Il-28
- Harbin SH-5 maritime bomber flying boat
- Harbin Y-11 STOL utility transport
- Harbin Y-12 transport; improved Y-11 with turboprop engines
- Harbin Z-5 Chinese version of Mil Mi-4
- Harbin/CHDRI Z-6 turboshaft-powered derivative of Z-5
- Harbin Z-9 license-built version of AS365
- Harbin Z-15 license-built version of H175
- Harbin Z-19 combat version of Z-9
- Harbin Z-20 medium-lift utility helicopter
- Harbin Z-21 heavy attack helicopter

=== Hardwick-Whittenbeck ===
(Dennis Hardwick & Clem Whittenbeck, Joplin, MO)

- Hardwick-Whittenbeck HW Special

=== Harlequin ===
(Harlequin Flying Club, San Francisco, CA)

- Harlequin 1931 Monoplane

=== Harley-Stromer ===
(Oregon Aircraft Co (Mayor Harley and Gus Stromer), Astoria, OR)

- Harley-Stromer 'Oregon Maid'

=== Harlow ===
(Harlow Aircraft Corp (Pres: J B Alexander), Alhambra, CA)

- Harlow C-80
- Harlow PJC-1
- Harlow PJC-2
- Harlow PJC-4
- Harlow PJC-5
- Harlow PC-5
- Harlow PC-5A
- Harlow PC-6

=== Harmening's High Flyers ===
(Genoa, IL)

- Harmening High Flyer

=== Harmon ===
(Harmon Engineering Company)

- Harmon Der Donnerschlag
- Harmon Mister America

=== Harmon ===
(C B Harmon)

- Harmon 1911 Biplane

=== Harmon ===
(George Richard Harmon, Richmond, VA)

- Harmon 1935 Biplane

=== Harmon ===
((D and John) Harmon Co Inc, Bakersfield, CA)

- Harmon Rocket 1 (Van's RV-3 Conv.)
- Harmon Rocket 11 (Van's RV-4 Conv.)
- Harmon Rocket 111 (Van's RV-5 Conv.)

=== Harmon-Spellman ===
(Ralph Harmon & L L Spellman, Greenwood, IN)

- Harmon-Spellman Sport

=== Harper ===
((Jack L) Harper Aircraft Mfg Co, Bedford and Elyra, OH)

- Harper 1-A
- Harper B-2
- Harper Roberts Special

=== Harper Aircraft ===
(Jacksonville, FL)

- Harper Lil Breezy

=== Harriman ===
(John Emery Harriman, Boston or Brookline, MA)

- Harriman 1904 Flying Machine
- Harriman 1910 Aerocar
- Harriman 1910 Aeromobile

=== Harriman ===
((Frank H/Frank M) Harriman Motor Works, South Glastonbury, CT) (Flew in the 1913 Great Lakes Reliability Cruise)

- Harriman 1912 Biplane
- Harriman 1913 Hydro
- Harriman 1915 Triplane

=== Harriman ===
(H E Harriman, Mineola, NY)

- Harriman 1919 Multi-Wing

=== Harris ===
(Richard Hillman Harris, Atlanta, GA)

- Harris parasol

=== Harris ===
(Douglas Harris, Pawtucket, RI)

- Harris 1930 Monoplane

=== Harris ===
(Vernon C Harris, Heyworth, IL)

- Harris Little Jewel

=== Harris ===
(J Warren Harris, Vernal, UT)

- Harris Geodetic#1
- Harris Geodetic#2
- Harris Geodetic LW 108

=== Harrison ===
(Charles D Harrison)

- Harrison K1S-1

=== Harrison ===
(Bruce Harrison, Redding, CA)

- Harrison Saunders Jethawk

=== Harth ===
(George Harth, The Dalles, OR)

- Harth Sport

=== Hartman ===
(Arthur J Hartman, Burlington, IA)

- Hartman 1910 Monoplane
- Burlington Biplane
- Burlington 1938 Monoplane
- Burlington H-1

=== Hartmann ===
(Hartmann Aircraft Corp, Jordan, NY)

- Hartmann OW-5M

=== Hartwig ===
(Hartwig Industries, San Antonio, TX)

- Hartwig Little 'Copter

=== Hartzell ===
(Hartzell Walnut Propeller Co, Piqua, OH and Detroit, MI)

- Johnson-Hartzell FC-1
- Johnson-Hartzell FC-2
- Hartzell MR-1
- Hartzell XX

=== Harvard ===
(Harvard Aeronautical Society, Cambridge, MA)

- Harvard Number 1

=== HarvEd ===
(HarvEd Aircraft Co (Harvey Calbo & Edward F Smithana), 1515 Phillips Ave, Racine, WI)

- HarvEd 1928 Monoplane
- HarvEd 1929 Monoplane

=== Hash ===
(Jack Hash, Crosbyton, TX)

- Hash Special

=== Hast ===
(George Hast)

- Hast Wooden Baby

=== Hastings ===
((Reed) Hastings Aeronautics Co, Hastings, NE)

- Hastings JCH-1

=== HAT ===
(Hellenic Aeronautical Technologies)

- HAT LS2

=== Hatfield ===
(Bob & Cliff Hatfield, Imperial, CA)

- Hatfield Haeco Hornet
- Hatfiel Racer

=== Hatfield ===
(Milton Hatfield, Elkhart, IN)

- Hatfield Prototype
- Hatfield Prototype 2
- Hatfield Little Bird#1
- Hatfield Little Bird#2
- Hatfield Little Bird#3

=== Hatz ===
(John D Hatz, Schofield and Merril, WI c.1980: Dudley R Kelly, Versailles, KY)

- Hatz CB-1

=== Hatzenbuhler ===
(Howard F Hatzenbuhler, Mt Clemens, MI)

- Hatzenbuhler Packard A

=== Haufe ===
(Walter H Haufe, Neenah, WI)

- Haufe Dale Hawk 2
- Haufe HA-G-1 Buggie
- Haufe HA-S-2 Hobby
- Haufe HA-S-3 Hawk
- Haufe Buzzer 2 Query Buzzard 2?
- Haufe Buzzard 2 Query Buzzer 2?

=== Hauptner ===
(Edward Hauptner, Long Island, NY)

- Hauptner 1932 Biplane

=== Havertz ===
(Hermann Havertz)

- Havertz HZ-5

=== Hawk ===
((Ernie) Hawk Industries Inc, Yucca Valley, CA)

- Hawk GAFhawk 125
- Hawk Minihawk
- Hawk GAFHawk 950 – enlarged version (not built)
- Hawk TurboHawk 85

=== Hawke ===
(Hawke Dusters (founders: Edwin R Hawke, John Cuneo), Modesto, CA)

- Hawke Duster
- Hawke SJ

=== Hawker ===
(Hawker Aircraft ltd.)

- Hawker Audax
- Hawker Cygnet
- Hawker Danecock
- Hawker Demon
- Hawker Duiker
- Hawker F.20/27
- Hawker Fury
- Hawker Hardy
- Hawker Harrier
- Hawker Hart
- Hawker Hartebeeste
- Hawker Hawfinch
- Hawker Hector
- Hawker Hedgehog
- Hawker Henley
- Hawker Heron
- Hawker Hind
- Hawker Hoopoe
- Hawker Hornbill
- Hawker Hornet
- Hawker Horsley
- Hawker Hotspur
- Hawker Hunter
- Hawker Hurricane
- Hawker Nimrod
- Hawker Osprey
- Hawker P.1052
- Hawker P.1077
- Hawker P.1081
- Hawker P.1121
- Hawker P.1134
- Hawker P.V.3
- Hawker P.V.4
- Hawker Sea Fury
- Hawker Sea Hawk
- Hawker Siddeley HS 748
- Hawker Sea Hurricane
- Hawker Tempest
- Hawker Tomtit
- Hawker Tornado
- Hawker Typhoon
- Hawker Woodcock
- Hawker AXH (Hawker Navy Experimental Type H Carrier Fighter)

=== Hawker Siddeley ===
(Hawker Siddeley Aircraft (1935–1948) Hawker Siddeley Aviation (1948–1977) Parent company of Armstrong Whitworth, Avro, Hawker, and Gloster companies)

- Hawker Siddeley Andover
- Hawker Siddeley Dominie
- Hawker Siddeley Harrier
- Hawker Siddeley Hawk
- Hawker Siddeley HS.125
- Hawker Siddeley HS.133
- Hawker Siddeley HS.138
- Hawker Siddeley P.139B
- Hawker Siddeley HS.145
- Hawker Siddeley HS.146
- Hawker Siddeley HS.141
- Hawker Siddeley HS.681
- Hawker Siddeley HS.748
- Hawker Siddeley HS.803
- Hawker Siddeley P.1127
- Hawker Siddeley P.1127 Kestrel
- Hawker Siddeley P.1127RAF
- Hawker Siddeley P.1134
- Hawker Siddeley P.1154
- Hawker Siddeley P.1200
- Hawker Siddeley P.1201
- Hawker Siddeley P.1202
- Hawker Siddeley P.1207
- Hawker Siddeley Nimrod
- Hawker Siddeley Trident

=== Hayden ===
(Hayden Aircraft Corporation)

- Hayden Bushmaster 15-AT

=== Hawks ===
((Frank) Hawks Aircraft Co, Springfield, MA)

- Hawks Miller HM-1

=== Hayden-Clark-O'Day ===
(E E Hayden & Jess Clark, Visalia, CA)

- Hayden-Clark-O'Day W-6

=== Hayden-Payne-Kinney ===
- Hayden-Payne-Kinney SPK-1

=== Hayes ===
(O R Hayes, Charleston, VA)

- Hayes Sport NA-1

=== Haynes ===
(Robin Haynes)

- Haynes Pintail

=== HB-Flugtechnik ===
(HB-Flugtechnik GmbH / HB Aircraft Industries Luftfahrzeug AG)

- HB-Flugtechnik HB-202
- HB Flugtechnik HB-204 Tornado
- HB-Flugtechnik HB-207 Alfa
- HB-Flugtechnik HB-208 Amigo
- HB-Flugtechnik HB-400
- HB-Flugtechnik Cubby
- HB-Flugtechnik Dandy
- HB-Flugtechnik HB 21
- HB-23/2400 Hobbyliner
- HB-23/2400 Scanliner

=== HDM ===
- Hurel-Dubois Miles HDM.105
- HDM.106
- HDM.107
- HDM.108

=== Headberg ===
(Headberg Aviation Inc.)

- Flaglor Sky Scooter

=== Heath ===
(Heath Aircraft Co Inc, 1721 Sedgwick St, Chicago, IL)

- Heath 1909 Aeroplane
- Heath 1919 Aeroplane
- Heath V Parasol
- Heath Tomboy
- Heath LNB-4 Parasol
- Heath LN
- Heath Humming Bird
- Heath Feather
- Heath Favorite
- Heath Cannon Ball
- Heath CA-1 Parasol
- Heath Baby Bullet
- Heath 2-B
- International 115 Special
- International 700
- International CNA-40 Centre-Wing
- International HV-2A
- International LNA-40 Parasol
- International LNM-5
- International TN
- International SNA-40 Special

=== Heath ===
(Malcolm R Heath, Warren, OH)

- Heath PH-1

=== HECC ===
(Helicopter Engineering and Construction Corp, RI)

- HECC 100

=== Heckerson ===
(Harold Heckerson (Hickerson?), Stoner Rd, Fostoria, OH)

- Heckerson A-1

=== Hege ===
(Paul Peter Hege, Sedgwick, KS)

- Hege Pup

=== Hegy ===
(Ray C Hegy, Marfa, TX)

- Hegy R.C.H.I. El Chuparosa
- Hegy June Bug

=== Hegy-Zunker ===
(Raymond C Hegy and Norman W Zunker, Hartford, WI)

- Hegy-Zunker Special

=== Heimann-Beachey ===
((M A) Heimann-(Hillery) Beachey Aeroplane Mfg Co, St Louis, MO)

- Heimann-Beachey 1911 Biplane

=== Heimbächer ===
(Fritz Heimbächer)

- Heimbächer No 4

=== Heinemann ===
(George (Gernot W) Heinemann, Bellingham, WA)

- Heinemann GH Parasol
- Heinemann Mosquito

=== Heinkel ===
(Ernst Heinkel A.G.) (note early Heinkel designation did NOT use the RLM He designation but HE-Heinkel Eindecker or HD-Heinkel Doppel-decker)

- Heinkel HE 1 low-wing floatplane (monoplane)
- Heinkel HE 2 improvement on the HE 1
- Heinkel HE 3
- Heinkel HE 4 reconnaissance (monoplane)
- Heinkel HE 5 reconnaissance (monoplane)
- Heinkel HE 8 reconnaissance (monoplane)
- Heinkel HE 9
- Heinkel HE 10
- Heinkel HE 12
- Heinkel HD 14
- Heinkel HD 15
- Heinkel HD 16
- Heinkel HD 17
- Heinkel HE 18
- Heinkel HD 19
- Heinkel HD 20
- Heinkel HD 21
- Heinkel HD 22
- Heinkel HD 23
- Heinkel HD 24 seaplane trainer (1926)
- Heinkel HD 26
- Heinkel HD 27
- Heinkel HD 28
- Heinkel HD 29
- Heinkel HD 30
- Heinkel HE 31
- Heinkel HD 32
- Heinkel HD 33
- Heinkel HD 35
- Heinkel HD 36
- Heinkel HD 37 fighter (biplane)
- Heinkel HD 38 fighter (biplane)
- Heinkel HD 39
- Heinkel HD 40
- Heinkel HD 41
- Heinkel HD 42 seaplane trainer
- Heinkel HD 43 fighter (biplane)
- Heinkel HD 44
- Heinkel HD 55
- Heinkel HD 56

==== (He – Heinkel (RLM designator)) ====
- Heinkel He 45 bomber + trainer
- Heinkel He 46 reconnaissance
- Heinkel He 49 fighter (biplane)
- Heinkel He 50 reconnaissance + dive bomber (biplane)
- Heinkel He 51 fighter + close-support (biplane)
- Heinkel He 52
- Heinkel He 57 Heron
- Heinkel He 58
- Heinkel He 59 reconnaissance (biplane seaplane)
- Heinkel He 60 ship-borne reconnaissance (biplane seaplane)
- Heinkel He 61
- Heinkel He 62
- Heinkel He 63
- Heinkel He 64
- Heinkel He 65
- Heinkel He 66
- Heinkel He 70 Blitz (Lightning), single-engine transport + mailplane, 1932
- Heinkel He 71
- Heinkel He 72 Kadett (Cadet), trainer
- Heinkel He 74 fighter + advanced trainer (prototype)
- Heinkel He 100 fighter
- Heinkel He 111 bomber
- Heinkel He 112 fighter
- Heinkel He 113 (fictitious alternative designation for He 100)
- Heinkel He 114 reconnaissance seaplane
- Heinkel He 115 general-purpose seaplane
- Heinkel He 116 transport + reconnaissance
- Heinkel He 118
- Heinkel He 119 single-engine high-speed bomber(prototypes), reconnaissance aircraft, 1937
- Heinkel He 120 four-engine long-range passenger flying-boat(project), 1938
- Heinkel He 162 "Salamander" Volksjäger (People's Fighter), fighter (jet-engined)
- Heinkel He 170
- Heinkel He 172 trainer (prototype)
- Heinkel He 176 pioneering liquid-fueled rocket-powered experimental aircraft (prototype)
- Heinkel He 177 Greif (Griffon), the Third Reich's only long-range heavy bomber
- Heinkel He 178 world's pioneering jet-engined experimental aircraft
- Heinkel He 219 Uhu (Owl), night-fighter
- Heinkel He 220
- Heinkel He 270
- Heinkel He 274 high-altitude bomber, He 177 development, two prototypes completed post-war in France
- Heinkel He 277 heavy bomber, paper-only He 177 development with four single engines, never built
- Heinkel He 280 fighter (jet-engined)
- Heinkel He 319
- Heinkel He 343 four-engined bomber (jet-engined) (project), 1944
- Heinkel He 419
- Heinkel He 519 high-speed bomber (He 119 derivative)(project only), 1944
- Heinkel KR-1
- Heinkel Army Type 98 Medium Bomber
- Heinkel Navy Type He Air Defence Fighter
- Heinkel Navy Type He Interceptor Fighter
- Heinkel Navy Experimental Type He Attack Plane
- Heinkel Navy Experimental Type He Trainer
- Heinkel Navy Experimental Type He Transport
- Heinkel A7He
- Heinkel AXHe
- Heinkel DXHe
- Heinkel KXHe
- Heinkel LXHe
- Heinkel-Aichi AM-17

=== Heinonen ===
(Juhani Heinonen)

- Heinonen HK-1 Keltiainen
- Heinonen HK-2

=== Heinrich ===
((Albert S and Arthur) Heinrich Aeroplane Co, Baldwin, NY, and Victor Aircraft Corp, Freeport, NY)

- Heinrich 1910 Monoplane
- Heinrich 1911 Monoplane#2
- Heinrich 15
- Heinrich Model B Monoplane
- Heinrich Model C Monoplane
- Heinrich Model D Monoplane
- Heinrich Model E Military Tractor Biplane
- Heinrich Model E-2 Military Tractor Biplane
- Victor 1917 Trainer
- Victor Pursuit
- Victor Advanced Trainer
- Victor D.8

=== Heintz ===
see Zenith or Zenair

=== Heinz (aircraft constructor) ===
- Heinz Floatplane(Lovejoy Curlycraft)
- Heinz 1939 Monoplane

=== Heiserman ===
(Charles Heiserman, Iron Mountain, MI)

- Heiserman 1933 Monoplane
- Heiserman 1937 Monoplane

=== Heldeberg Designs ===
(Altamont, NY)

- Heldeberg Spirit 103
- Heldeberg Marathon
- Heldeberg Convertible

=== Heli-Sport ===
(Heli-Sport, Turin, Italy)

- Heli-Sport CH-7 Angel
- Heli-Sport CH-7 Kompress
- Heli-Sport CH-7 Kompress Charlie
- Heli-Sport CH-7 Kompress Charlie 2
- Heli-Sport CH-7 Mariner
- Heli-Sport CH77 Ranabot

=== Helibras ===
(Helicopteros do Brasil S/A)

- Helibras HB315B Gavião
- Helibras HB350 Esquilo
- Helibras HB355 Esquilo

=== Helicom ===
(Helicom Inc, Long Beach, CA)

- Helicom H-1 Commuter Jr
- Helicom Commuter II
- Helicom Commuter IIA
- Helicom Commuter IIB

=== Helicop-Air ===
- Helicop-Air L-50 Girhel

=== Helicop-Jet ===
- Helicop-Jet

=== Helicopters Inc ===
(Reformed and renamed from Bendix Helicopters Inc, Stratford, CT)

- Helicopters Inc Model J
- Helicopters Inc Model K

=== Helicópteros ===
(Helicópteros de Bolivia SRL / Helicóptero nacional / Helicóptero Boliviano)

- Helicópteros Bolivia I
- Helicópteros AB-32 Sirionó (Sirionó – Jaguar)

=== Helio ===
(1956: Helio Corp & Aeronca Aircraft Corp, Pittsburg, KS; c.1959: Helio Aircraft Corp, Pittsburg, KS; Helio Aircraft Corp, Norwood, MA; 1969: Helio Aircraft Co div of General Aircraft Corp. 1984: Acquired by Aerospace Technology Industries. 1989: Acquired by Aircraft Acquisition Corp and revived as Helio Aircraft Corp, Morgantown, WV; 1992: Helio Enterprises Inc)

- Koppen-Bollinger Helioplane
- Helioplane Two
- Helioplane Four
- Helio Courier
- Helio Rat'ler
- Helio Super courier
- Helio Stallion
- Helio H-250
- Helio H-291
- Helio H-295
- Helio HT-295 Trigear Courier
- Helio H-391 Courier
- Helio H-392 Strato Courier
- Helio H-395 Super Courier
- Helio H-500 Twin Courier
- Helio H-550 Stallion
- Helio H-634 Twin Stallion
- Helio H-700 Courier
- Helio H-800 Courier
- Helio H-1201T Twin Stallion
- Helio L-24 Courier
- Helio L-28 Courier
- Helio U-5 Twin Courier
- Helio U-10 Courier
- Helio AU-24 Stallion

=== Heliopolis ===
(Heliopolis Aircraft Works)

- Heliopolis Gomhouria

=== Helios ===
- Helios Prototype

=== Helite ===
(A brand of La Mouette, Messigny, France)

- Helite Skydancer
- Helite Tsunami

=== Helle-Franklin ===
- Helle-Franklin 1927 Biplane

=== Hellesen-Kahn ===
- Hellesen-Kahn HK-1

=== Helmerichs ===
(Henry Helmerichs, Ryegate, MT)

- Helmerichs 1932 monoplane

=== Helmy ===
(Saleh Helmy)

- Helmy Aerogypt

=== Helowerks ===
(Helowerks, Hampton, VA)

- Helowerks HX-1 Wasp

=== Helwan Aircraft Factory ===
(Helwan / Egyptian General Aero Organisation / Factory No.36)

- Helwan HA-300

=== Hempearth ===
- Hempearth Hemp Plane

=== Hemstreet ===
(S Hemstreet, Chattanooga, TN)

- Hemstreet Jessie

=== Hendershott ===
(Ward & Bruce Hendershott, Sioux City, IA)

- Hendershott 1929 Biplane

=== Henderson Aero Specialties ===
(Felton, DE)

- Henderson Little Bear

=== Henderson School of Flying ===
(Brooklands, England)

- Henderson H.S.F.1

=== Henderson-Glenny ===
- Henderson-Glenny Gadfly

=== Hendrick ===
(C J Hendrick, Middletown, NJ)

- Hendrick 1910 Monoplane

=== Hendrickson ===
(O J Hendrickson, Middletown, NJ)

- Hendrickson 1910 Biplane

=== Hendy ===
- Hendy 302
- Hendy Heck
- Hendy Hobo

=== Hennessey ===
(James R Hennessey)

- Hennessey 1926 Monoplane

=== Hennesy ===
(Gerald Hennesy, Washington, DC)

- Henesy Monoplane

=== Hennion ===
(Emile Hennion)

- Hennion I
- Hennion II

=== Henri Farman ===
- See: Farman Aviation Works

=== Henschel ===
(Henschel Flugzeugwerke A.G.)

- Henschel Hs 121
- Henschel Hs 122
- Henschel Hs 123
- Henschel Hs 124
- Henschel Hs 125
- Henschel Hs 126
- Henschel Hs 127
- Henschel Hs 128
- Henschel Hs 129
- Henschel Hs 130
- Henschel Hs 132

=== Hensley ===
(Edward Freeland Hensley, Oklahoma City, OK)

- Hensley 1936 Biplane

=== Hensley ===
(Hensley Aircraft)

- Hensley H1 Wolf

=== Herbst ===
(Frank Herbst, Wilmington, NC)

- Herbst 1911 Aeroplane

=== HERC ===
(Helicopter Engineering and Research Corporation)

- HERC JOV-3

=== Hereter ===
(Talleres Hereter – Barcelona)

- Hereter T.H. (Alfaro 8)

=== Herff ===
(Adolph P Herff & Orval H Snyder, San Antonio and Boeme, TX)

- Herff 1909 Aeroplane
- Herff 1926 Aeroplane

=== Hergt ===
(F.D. Hergt / Fliegerersatz-Abteilung 1- F.E.A. 1 – pilot reserve section 1)

- Hergt Monoplane

=== Hermann ===
(Ateliers Fred Herrmann)

- de Glymes DG X (DG-10)

=== Hermes ===
- Hermes Concept

=== Hermeus ===
- Hermeus Concept

=== Hernandez ===
(Frank Hernandez, San Diego, CA)

- Hernandez Rapier 65

=== Herr ===
(Harold D Herr, Millersville, PA)

- Herr Eaglet

=== Herren ===
((Wilson) Herren Aeronautical Corp, Barrington, IL)

- Herren CL-32

=== Herrick ===
(Gerald & Myron Herrick, Philadelphia, PA)

- Herrick HV-1
- Herrick HV-2 Vertaplane
- Herrick HV-3 Vertaplane

=== Hershfield ===
(Harry A Hershfield Jr, Santa Rosa, NM)

- Hershfield VJA Special

=== Hervey ===
(George H Hervey, San Fernando, CA)

- Hervey Travelplane

=== Herzog ===
(R D Herzog (Herzog Bros), Harvard, NE)

- Herzog Meteor
- Herzog Model 2

=== HESA ===
(a.k.a.Iran Aircraft Manufacturing Industries Corporation (IAMI))

- HESA Azarakhsh
- HESA Saeqeh
- HESA IrAn-140
- HESA IrAn-148
- HESA Shahed X5
- HESA Shahed 274
- HESA Shahed 278
- HESA Shahed 285
- HESA Dorna
- HESA Yasin
- HESA Shabaviz 2-75
- HESA Shabaviz 2061

=== Hesley ===
(Bob Hesley, Houston, TX)

- Hesley Pussy Cat

=== Hess ===
((Adrian T & Aubrey W) Hess Aircraft Co Inc, Van Alstyne Blvd, Wyandotte, MI)

- Hess H-1 Bluebird
- Hess H-2 Bluebird

=== Heston ===
- Heston Type 1 Phoenix
- Heston Type 5 Racer
- Heston T.1/37
- Heston JC.6 (A.2/45)

=== Heuberger ===
(Lawrence K Heuberger, El Paso, TX and Los Alamitos, CA)

- Heuberger Doodle Bug
- Heuberger Sizzler
- Heuberger Stinger

=== Hewa Technics ===
- Hewa Technics J-5 Marco
