= Buzzer (disambiguation) =

A buzzer is a signalling device.

Buzzer or The Buzzer may also refer to:

- Buzzer (whirligig), an ancient mechanical device used for ceremonial purposes and as a toy
- Buzzer (internet), an Indonesian term to refer to influence operators
- Buzzer (G.I. Joe), a fictional character in the G.I. Joe universe
- The Buzzer, nickname for radio station UVB-76
- Buzzer beater, basketball term
- Haufe Buzzer 2, motorglider
- Buzzr, an American digital multicast television network
- Jointer, A woodworking machine used to produce a flat surface along a board's length.
