= H43 =

H43 may refer to:

- H-43 Huskie, a United States Air Force helicopter
- H43 Lund, a handball team from Sweden
- Hanriot H.43, a 1927 French military utility aircraft
- HMS H43, a Royal Navy H-class submarine
- HMS Havock (H43), a Royal Navy H-class destroyer
