= Hanriot HD.17 =

HD.17

General information
- Type: Seaplane trainer
- National origin: France
- Manufacturer: Hanriot
- Primary user: Aéronautique Maritime
- Number built: >50

History
- First flight: 1923

The Hanriot HD.17 was a French trainer seaplane of the 1920s. It was essentially a floatplane version of the ubiquitous HD.14 with a revised tail and a more powerful engine. Over 50 examples were operated by the Aéronautique Maritime, of which seven were converted to landplanes. A small number of HD.17s were exported to Estonia and Latvia. Further development resulted in the HD.41H.

== Variants ==
HD.17
Floatplane trainer derived from the Hanriot HD.14
HD.41H
Further development of the HD.17 as a floatplane trainer.

== Operators ==
France

- French Navy

Estonia
Latvia

- Latvian Navy

== Specifications (HD.17) ==
Data from Aviafrance:Hanriot HD-17

General characteristics

- Crew: 2
- Length: 8.33 m (27 ft 4 in)
- Wingspan: 10.26 m (33 ft 8 in)
- Height: 3.25 m (10 ft 8 in)
- Wing area: 34.9 m^{2} (376 sq ft)
- Empty weight: 725 kg (1,598 lb)
- Gross weight: 980 kg (2,161 lb)
- Powerplant: 1 × Clerget 9B 9-cylinder air-cooled rotary piston engine, 97 kW (130 hp)
- Propellers: 2-bladed fixed pitch wooden propeller

Performance

- Maximum speed: 120 km/h (75 mph, 65 kn)
- Range: 200 km (120 mi, 110 nmi)

== See also ==
Related lists

- List of Interwar military aircraft
