= Hanriot HD.40 =

1920s French aircraft

HD.40S

General information
- Type: Medical transport
- National origin: France
- Manufacturer: Hanriot
- Number built: 14

History
- First flight: 1925
- Developed from: Hanriot HD.14S

The Hanriot HD.40S (S- Sanitaire - medical transport) was a two-seat medical transport aircraft built in the 1920s, derived from the Hanriot HD.14S.

== Specifications (HD.40S) ==
Data from

General characteristics

- Crew: 2
- Length: 7.25 m (23 ft 9 in)
- Wingspan: 10.25 m (33 ft 8 in)
- Height: 3.05 m (10 ft 0 in)
- Wing area: 34.9 m^{2} (376 sq ft)
- Empty weight: 595 kg (1,312 lb)
- Gross weight: 856 kg (1,887 lb)
- Powerplant: 1 × Salmson 9Ac 9-cylinder air-cooled radial piston engine, 89 kW (120 hp)

Performance

- Maximum speed: 120 km/h (75 mph, 65 kn)
- Range: 350 km (220 mi, 190 nmi)
- Service ceiling: 4,000 m (13,000 ft)
