= Hanriot HD.28 =

HD.28
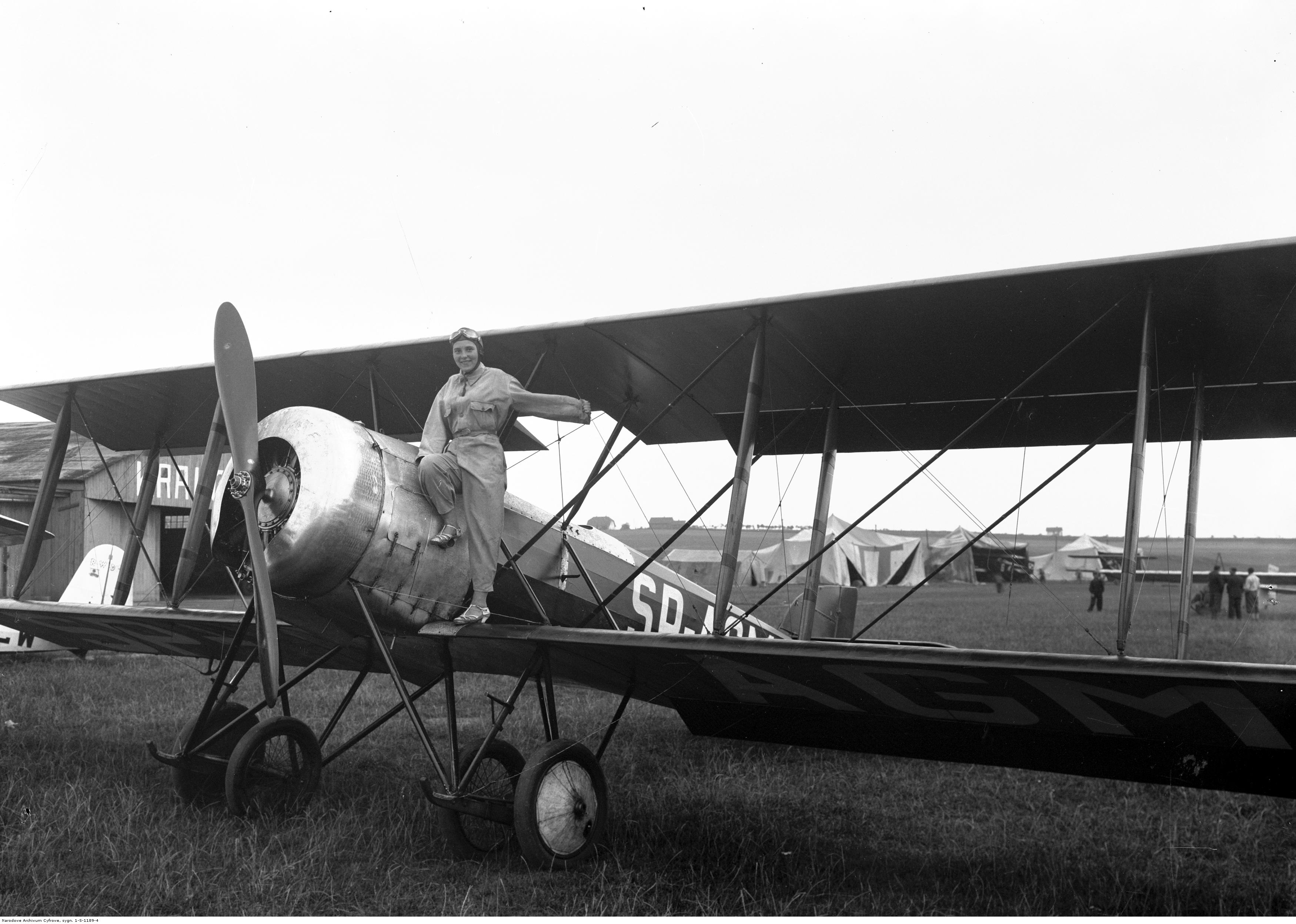

General information
- Type: Military trainer
- National origin: France
- Manufacturer: Hanriot

History
- First flight: 1928

The Hanriot HD.28 was a military trainer aircraft developed in France in the 1920s as a modernised version of the HD.14 for export markets. The principal difference between the types was that while the HD.14 had an entirely wooden structure, the HD.28's structure was almost entirely metal. The landing gear was also of more conventional design, with only one wheel on each main unit, plus small anti-noseover skids. The two tandem cockpits of the HD.14 were replaced by a single, long cockpit in which both pilot and instructor sat.

The aircraft designated as Hanriot H-28 was in fact a Polish-built (at Samolot and CWL), slightly modified version of the wooden-construction Hanriot HD.14.

== Specifications ==
General characteristics

- Crew: Two, pilot and instructor
- Length: 7.25 m (23 ft 9 in)
- Wingspan: 10.87 m (35 ft 8 in)
- Height: 3.08 m (10 ft 1 in)
- Empty weight: 575 kg (1,270 lb)
- Gross weight: 830 kg (1,830 lb)
- Powerplant: 1 × Le Rhône 9C , 60 kW (80 hp)

Performance

- Maximum speed: 110 km/h (70 mph, 61 kn)
- Range: 260 km (160 mi, 140 nmi)
- Service ceiling: 4,000 m (13,100 ft)

== See also ==
Related lists

- List of Interwar military aircraft

== Bibliography ==
- Nelcarz, Bartolomiej & Peczkowski, Robert (2001). White Eagles: The Aircraft, Men and Operations of the Polish Air Force 1918–1939. Ottringham, UK: Hikoki Publications. ISBN 1-902109-73-2.
- Taylor, Michael J. H. (1989). Jane's Encyclopedia of Aviation. London: Studio Editions. p. 470.
- World Aircraft Information Files. London: Bright Star Publishing. pp. File 896 Sheet 11.
