= Hanriot LH.30 =

1930s French aircraft

LH.30

General information
- Type: Civil trainer aircraft
- National origin: France
- Manufacturer: Hanriot
- Number built: 2

History
- First flight: 1931
- Developed from: Hanriot LH.13

The Lorraine-Hanriot LH.30 was a training monoplanes built in France in the early 1930s.

== Design ==
It was a conventional parasol-wing monoplane with fixed tailskid undercarriage, the main units of which were mounted on outriggers attached to the wing struts. The pilot and instructor sat in tandem open cockpits. The LH.30 was of wood and metal construction.

== Specifications (LH.30) ==
Data from Aviafrance : Lorraine Hanriot LH.30

General characteristics

- Length: 8.16 m (26 ft 9 in)
- Wingspan: 11.86 m (38 ft 11 in)
- Height: 3.41 m (11 ft 2 in)
- Wing area: 21.25 m^{2} (228.7 sq ft)
- Empty weight: 883 kg (1,947 lb)
- Gross weight: 1,328 kg (2,928 lb)
- Powerplant: 1 × Lorraine 7Mb Mizar 7-cylinder air-cooled radial piston engine, 180 kW (240 hp)

Performance

- Maximum speed: 201 km/h (125 mph, 109 kn)
- Range: 8,895 km (5,527 mi, 4,803 nmi)
- Service ceiling: 6,000 m (20,000 ft)
- Time to altitude: 1,000 m (3,300 ft) in 3 min 35 s
