= Hanriot HD.32 =

HD.32
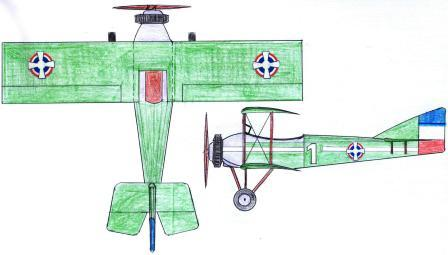

General information
- Type: Military trainer
- Manufacturer: Hanriot, Zmaj aircraft from Zemun Yugoslavia
- Primary user: Aéronautique Militaire

History
- First flight: 1924

The Hanriot HD.32 was a military trainer aircraft built in France in the 1920s. Derived from the HD.14 and sharing the same basic configuration as it, the HD.32 was a substantially revised design, with redesigned tailplane, undercarriage, and wings of shorter span. The HD.14's wooden construction was replaced in part with metal structure.

The HD.32 was Hanriot's entry in a 1924 Aéronautique Militaire competition to select a new trainer, and as the winner, was ordered in quantity as the HD.32 EP.2. The type HD.320 was also built in Yugoslavia by Zmaj aircraft in Zemun, using a Salmson 9Ac, Siemens Sh12 or Walter NZ-120, engine.

In 1927, the Paraguayan Military Aviation School received three HD.32 which received the serials E.1, E.2 and E.3 (E meaning Escuela, School). They were supplemented by five Fleet 2 trainers in 1931, but remained in use until the end of the Chaco War, when they were retired.

== Operators ==
France

- French Air Force

El Salvador

- Salvadoran Air Force

Japan

- One aircraft only.

Paraguay

- Paraguayan Air Force - Three aircraft purchased in 1927 for the Military Aviation School.

Kingdom of Yugoslavia

- 12 aircraft H.320 mod. 1926, Product: Aeroplanes Hanriot France
- 45 aircraft H.320 mod. 1928, Product: Zmaj - Zemun Yugoslavia

== Variants ==
- HD.32 - main production version for Aéronautique Militaire with Le Rhône 9C engine
- HD.320 - version with Salmson 9Ac engine (12 built + 45 Zmaj Zemun Yugoslavia)
- HD.321 - version with Clerget 9B engine (11 built, plus 4 converted from HD.32 and four converted from HD.14)

== Specifications ==
General characteristics

- Crew: Two, pilot and observer
- Length: 7.11 m (23 ft 4 in)
- Wingspan: 9.20 m (30 ft 2 in)
- Height: 2.95 m (9 ft 8 in)
- Wing area: 29.8 m^{2} (321 sq ft)
- Empty weight: 510 kg (1,120 lb)
- Gross weight: 760 kg (1,680 lb)
- Powerplant: 1 × Le Rhône 9C , 60 kW (80 hp)

Performance

- Maximum speed: 120 km/h (75 mph, 65 kn)
- Range: 200 km (125 mi, 109 nmi)
- Service ceiling: 3,850 m (12,600 ft)

== See also ==
Related lists

- List of Interwar military aircraft
