= Heldeberg Convertible =

American powered parachute

Convertible

General information
- Type: Powered parachute
- National origin: United States
- Manufacturer: Heldeberg Designs
- Status: Production completed

The Heldeberg Convertible, also called the Blue Heron Convertible, is an American powered parachute, that was designed and produced by Heldeberg Designs of Altamont, New York.

== Design and development ==
The Convertible was designed to comply with the US FAR 103 Ultralight Vehicles rules for single seaters, including the category's maximum empty weight of 254 lb (115 kg). The aircraft has a standard empty weight of 245 lb (111 kg). It took its name from the design feature whereby it can be fitted with a second seat for instruction or passenger carrying.

The model features a parachute-style high-wing, single seat, or optionally two-seats-in-tandem, accommodation, tricycle landing gear and a single 50 hp (37 kW) Rotax 503 engine in pusher configuration.

The aircraft is built from a combination of bolted aluminium and stainless steel tubing. It features a double ring propeller guard that has been roll-over tested. The 5 U.S. gallons (19 L; 4.2 imp gal) fuel tank is made from aluminium. In flight steering is accomplished via foot pedals, or optionally a control stick, that actuate the canopy brakes, creating roll and yaw. On the ground the aircraft has lever-controlled nosewheel steering. The main landing gear incorporates gas strut suspension. The aircraft is factory supplied in the form of an assembly kit that requires 30–50 hours to complete.

Originally marketed by the factory under their own name, the aircraft was later marketed under the brand name Blue Heron, although the manufacturer remained the same.

== Specifications (Blue Heron Convertible) ==
Data from Cliche

General characteristics

- Crew: one
- Capacity: one passenger
- Wing area: 500 sq ft (46 m^{2})
- Empty weight: 245 lb (111 kg)
- Fuel capacity: 5 U.S. gallons (19 L; 4.2 imp gal)
- Powerplant: 1 × Rotax 503 twin cylinder, two-stroke, air-cooled aircraft engine, 50 hp (37 kW)
