= Hawk GAFHawk =

Freighter aircraft

GafHawk

General information
- Type: Freighter
- National origin: United States
- Manufacturer: Hawk International
- Number built: 1

History
- First flight: 19 August 1982

The Hawk GafHawk ("General Aviation Freighter") was a small, turboprop-powered freighter aircraft developed in the United States in the 1980s but which only flew in prototype form. It was designed by Hawk International as a means of transporting drilling equipment in and out of remote locations, and was designed to be simple, rugged, and have good STOL and rough-field performance. The resulting design was a boxy aircraft with a rectangular-section fuselage with a high-set tail and rear loading ramp. The high aspect-ratio wings were high-set and braced with struts. The landing gear was fixed and of tricycle configuration, with the main units having dual wheels.

Certification proved elusive, however, and Hawk eventually abandoned the project without building any other examples. The only Gafhawk ever made crash landed and remains10 miles south of Allen Army Airfield, Fort Greely, Alaska Latitude 63.8478333 North / 145.60742665 West.

== Variants ==
- GafHawk 125 - prototype and intended production version (1 built)
- GafHawk 950 - enlarged version (not built)
- TurboHawk 85 - twin-engine version (not built)

== Specifications ==
Data from Jane's All the World's Aircraft 1988–89

General characteristics

- Crew: Two pilots
- Length: 46 ft 11 in (14.30 m)
- Wingspan: 71 ft 6 in (21.79 m)
- Height: 18 ft 0 in (5.49 m)
- Wing area: 493 sq ft (45.8 m^{2})
- Aspect ratio: 10.4:1
- Empty weight: 6,800 lb (3,084 kg)
- Gross weight: 14,500 lb (6,577 kg)
- Fuel capacity: 360 US gal (300 imp gal; 1,363 L)
- Powerplant: 1 × Pratt & Whitney Canada PT6A-65B/R , 1,173 hp (875 kW)

Performance

- Cruise speed: 138 mph (222 km/h, 120 kn) at 10,000 ft (3,050 m) (max cruise); 127 mph (110 kn; 204 km/h) (econ cruise: 55% power)
- Stall speed: 54 mph (87 km/h, 47 kn) (flaps down, power off)
- Range: 824 mi (1,326 km, 716 nmi) with maximum fuel
- Service ceiling: 18,000 ft (5,500 m)
- Rate of climb: 920 ft/min (4.7 m/s) at sea level
- Take-off run to 50 ft (15 m): 1,660 ft (510 m)
- Landing run from 50 ft (15 m): 1,430 ft (440 m)
