= Hanriot H.43 =

H.43
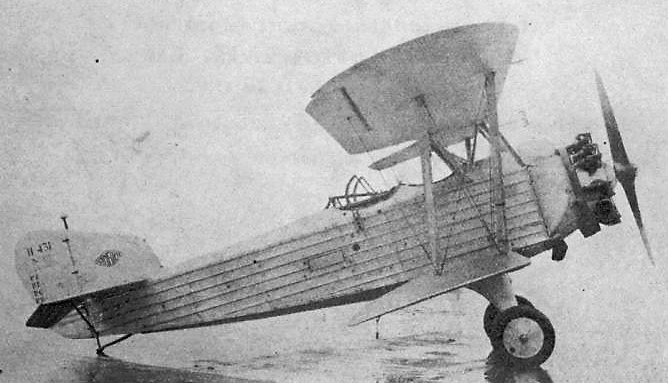
- H.431

General information
- Type: Military utility aircraft
- National origin: France
- Manufacturer: Hanriot
- Primary user: Aéronautique Militaire
- Number built: ca. 160

History
- First flight: 1927

The Hanriot H.43 was a military utility biplane designed and produced by the French aircraft manufacturer Hanriot. It was primarily used by the Aéronautique Militaire as a trainer aircraft during the interwar period.

While Hanriot had spent most of the 1920s manufacturing various developments of the HD.14 that had first flown in 1920, the H.43 was an entirely new design. It was a conventional single-bay biplane with staggered wings of unequal span and a fuselage of fabric-covered metal tube. Accommodation for the pilot and passenger was in tandem, open cockpits and the main units of the fixed, tailskid undercarriage were linked by a cross-axle.

During 1927, a pair of prototypes performed their maiden flights; these were quickly followed by the LH.431 during 1928, a much-modified version that dispensed with the sweepback used on both the upper and lower wings of the H.43, had a new tail fin and added metal covering to the sides of the fuselage. This was ordered into production by the Aéronautique Militaire, which ordered 50 examples. These were slightly different again from the LH.431 prototype, having divided main undercarriage units, wings of slightly greater area, and redesigned interplane struts.

== Development ==
Work on what would become the Hanriot H 43 had commenced in response to a requirement issued by France's Ministry of War for a new general purpose aircraft. Numerous stipulations of this requirement were set out; these included the economic provision of the qualities and attributes of an aircraft for advanced training purpose, including performing aerobatic manoeuvres, night flying, and the apparatus for the practice of various training roles, such as aerial photography, radio operation, signalling (using rockets), bombing, and gunnery practice. It was to be provisioned with dual flying controls, purpose-built seating, and seat-pack parachutes. Both the pilot and observer were to have ideal downward visibility from their seated positions. The aircraft was also required to be relatively easy to fly and have a minimum radius of action of 450 km (280 miles) in still air.

During the early 1930s, Hanriot implemented various design improvements based on the findings of an internal study; it was at this time that the axleless landing gear arrangement was adopted as well as the substitution of the conventional tail skid with a shoe equipped with an oleo-pneumatic shock absorber, a mid-flight adjustable stabiliser, a ground-adjustable rudder bar, and general equipment installation improvements.

== Design ==
The Hanriot H.43 was a military utility biplane. The fuselage of the aircraft was rectangular, its structure being composed of four tubular longerons; the longerons, cross-pieces, and uprights were all composed of duralumin, with cross-pieces and uprights of the same material. The fuselage was sheathed across its entire length with duralumin plates; these could be rapidly removed, both to facilitate maintenance work as well as the installation and removal of the various equipment. It was permanently equipped with an Optique & Précision de Levallois bomb sight, an STA sight support, twin Lewis machine guns on a movable ring mount. The observer's cockpit was relatively spacious, permitting the simultaneous installation of radio equipment, photographic apparatus, and fittings for night flying. All installations could also be operated during a single flight.

The aircraft possessed favourable flying qualities, being both easy to control and a high degree of manoeuvrability; it was deemed to be suitable for the preparation of less-experienced pilots to operate military aircraft. It was equipped with dual flying controls as standard. These flying controls were well balanced and relatively efficient for the era, qualities that were deemed to be particularly beneficial for stunt flying. As to optimally accommodate different loads, the aircraft could be easily trimmed from both the pilot and observers' positions. The aircraft could carry sufficient fuel to permit up to two and a half hours of flight at full power. The duralumin fuel tank, which were located at the bottom of the fuselage, were unprotected, but could be emptied quickly or dropped entirely at the pilot's direction during an emergency. The undercarriage was formed out of two lateral V-shaped struts, which were equipped with easily swappable shock absorbers.

The wings of the H.43 had a positive stagger. On account of the shaping of the wing, including its large gap and stagger, relatively high aerodynamic efficiency was achieved along with several other positive flying characteristics. The cutaways in the wings, relatively high cabane, and general shape also gave the particularly good visibility in several directions. The bracing wires were composed of high-resistance steel while the struts, along with the majority of the wing structure, were comprised duralumin, although the ribs were composed of wood. The ailerons were actuated via cables that were run over a series of pulleys incorporating ball bearings. The wing structure was reviewed by the French government, who issued their formal approval on 4 February 1928. The design's safety was demonstrated using relatively severe static testing for the era.

The flight control surfaces of the empennage had a duralumin structure and a fabric covering. The stabilizer could be readily adjusted during flight while the fin could only be adjusted on the ground. The elevator control was entirely rigid and was mounted on ball bearings with a ball-and-socket joint, while both the rudder and ailerons were flexible and run over large grooved ball-bearing pulleys.

The H 43 was typically powered by a single Salmson CM.9 radial engine, which was capable of producing up to 240 hp; the aircraft had been designed to accommodate the installation of various other engines of similar characteristics. The engine mount was made of sheet duralumin and was directly attached to the front end of the fuselage by four ball-and-socket joints. This mount was considered to be a relatively strong mounting that could comfortably address the torque generated by the running engine. The oil tank, which was composed of copper, was placed directly above the engine. As standard, the aircraft was provided with a fire extinguisher and a built-in starter.

== Operational history ==
Between 1927 and 1933, the Aéronautique Militaire procured almost 150 aircraft, which they used in a wide variety of support roles, including training, liaison, aerial observation, and as an air ambulance. At the end of the Battle of France in June 1940, 75 of these aircraft reportedly remained in service.

In addition to their military use, numerous H.43s were also operated by various civilian flying schools across France. An export order for 12 aircraft for the Peruvian Air Force was also secured.

== Variants ==
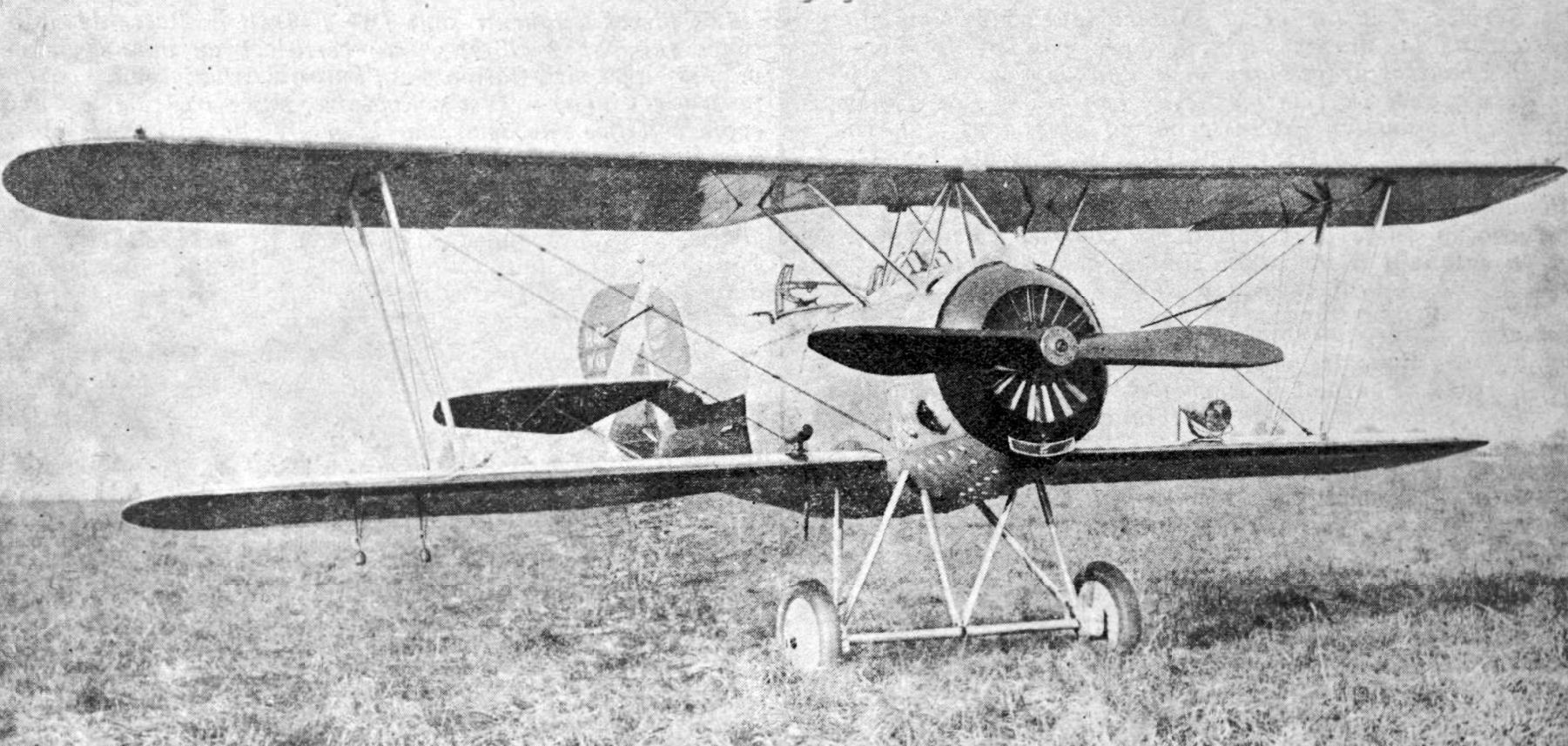
Hanriot H.43 photo from L'Air May 15, 1928

- H.43 – prototype with Salmson CM.9 engine (2 built)
- H.430 – version with Salmson 9Ab engine (1 under construction but never completed)
- H.431.01 – development of H.430 with revised wings, fin, and fuselage and Lorraine 7Ma engine (1 built)
- LH.431 – production version with divided main undercarriage units and Lorraine 7Mc engine (62 built)
- LH.432 – gunnery training version with machine gun on ring mount in rear cockpit (1 built, plus 1 converted from LH.431)
- LH.433 – revised LH.431 with modified landing gear and tail fin, and Lorraine 7Me engine (26 built)
- LH.434 – (1 built)
- H.436 – dedicated trainer version based on LH.433 with Salmson 9Ab engine (50 built)
- LH.437 – air ambulance version based on LH.433 (1 built, plus one converted from LH.431)
  - LH.437ter – air ambulance version with Salmson engine (1 converted from LH.437. Subsequently converted back and redesignated H.437/1).
- H.438 – export version of LH.433 for Peru (12 built)
- H.439 – civil trainer version, some with tailwheel in place of tailskid (13 converted from LH.431).

== Operators ==
France

- French Air Force

Peru

- Peruvian Air Force

Spain

- Spanish Republican Air Force, Hanriot LH.437/239

== Specifications (H.431) ==
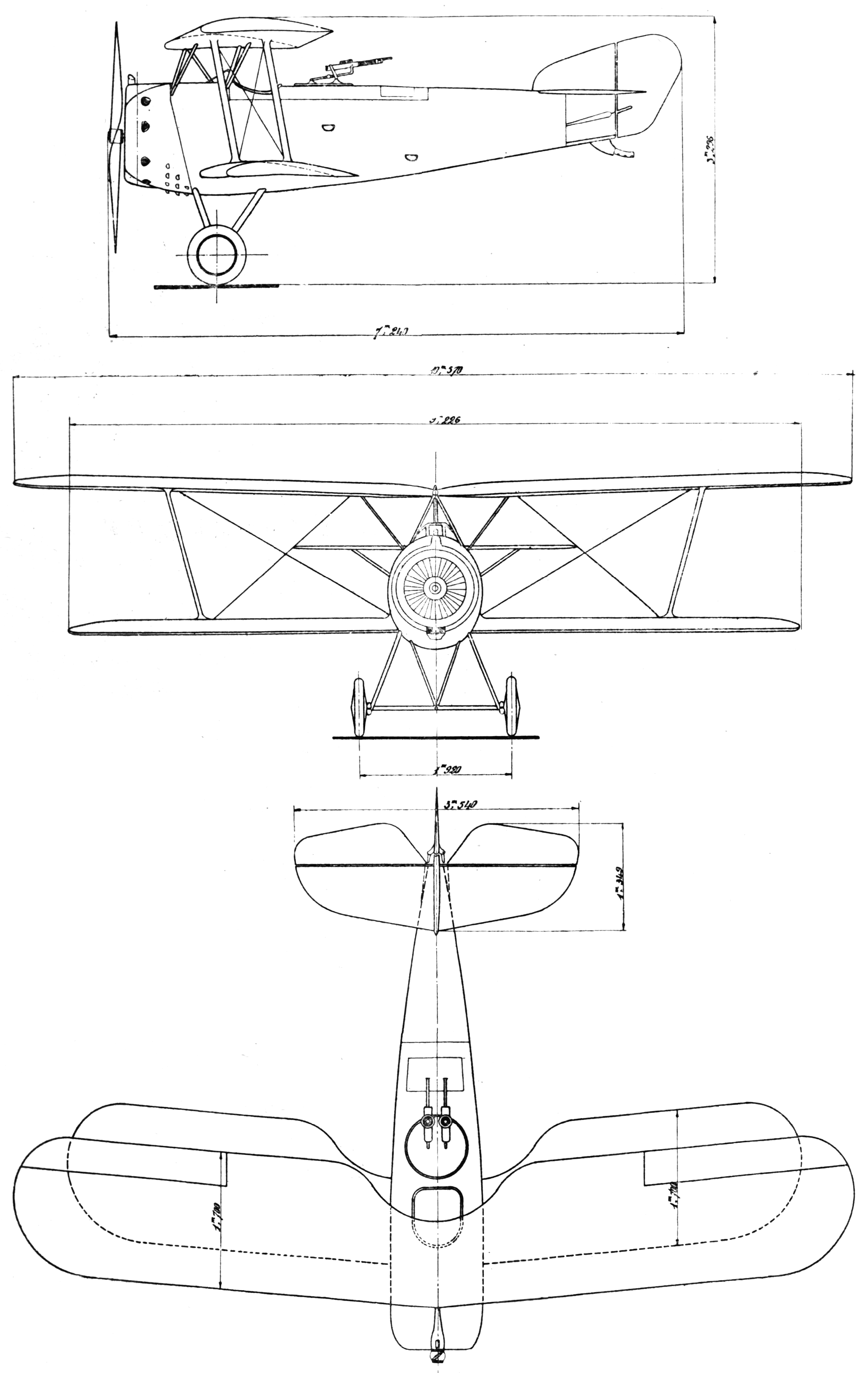
Hanriot H.43 3-view drawing from L'Air May 15, 1928

Data from Jane's all the World's Aircraft 1928

General characteristics

- Crew: 2
- Length: 7.24 m (23 ft 9 in)
- Wingspan: 10.6 m (34 ft 9 in)
- Height: 4.2 m (13 ft 9 in)
- Wing area: 53.5 m^{2} (576 sq ft)
- Empty weight: 842 kg (1,856 lb)
- Gross weight: 1,420 kg (3,131 lb)
- Powerplant: 1 × Salmson CM.9 nine-cylinder air-cooled radial piston engine, 170 kW (230 hp)
- Propellers: 2-bladed fixed pitch propeller

Performance

- Maximum speed: 185 km/h (115 mph, 100 kn) 180 km/h (110 mph; 97 kn) at 2,000 m (6,600 ft)

173 km/h (107 mph; 93 kn) at 4,000 m (13,000 ft)
166 km/h (103 mph; 90 kn) at 5,000 m (16,000 ft)

- Range: 450 km (280 mi, 240 nmi)
- Endurance: Three hours
- Service ceiling: 6,000 m (20,000 ft)
- Time to altitude: 2,000 m (6,600 ft) in eight minutes and 36 seconds

4,000 m (13,000 ft) in 22 minutes and 12 seconds
5,000 m (16,000 ft) in 38 minutes

- Wing loading: 50.3 kg/m^{2} (10.3 lb/sq ft)
- Power/mass: 0.1236 kW/kg (0.0752 hp/lb)

== See also ==
Related lists

- List of Interwar military aircraft
- List of aircraft of the Spanish Republican Air Force
