= Hafner A.R.III Gyroplane =

A.R.III Gyroplane
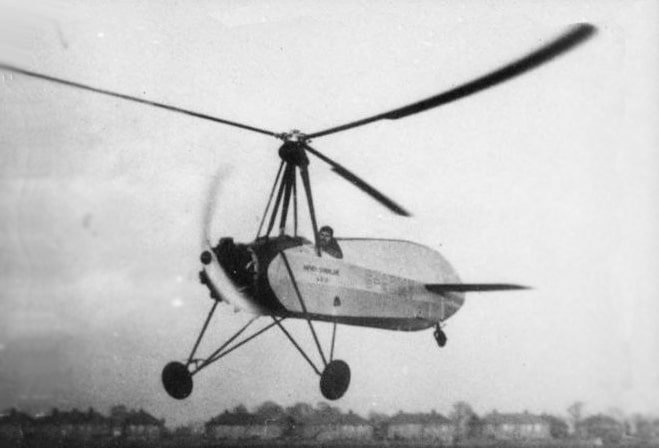
- Hafner AR.III in flight, 1935

General information
- Type: Experimental autogyro
- National origin: United Kingdom
- Manufacturer: A.R.III Construction Company
- Designer: Raoul Hafner
- Number built: 1

History
- First flight: Autumn 1935

The Hafner A.R.III Gyroplane was a British 1930s experimental autogyro designed by Austrian Raoul Hafner, and built by the A.R.III Construction Company at Denham, Buckinghamshire.

== Design and development ==
The single-seat Gyroplane had a three-blade auto-rotating rotor fitted above the fuselage on a strutted plyon. A 90 hp (67 kW) Pobjoy Niagara radial piston engine was mounted on the fuselage nose. It had fixed tailwheel landing gear and the rear fuselage included a large dorsal fin to provide directional stability. An unusual feature was the control system which was equipped with spider-actuated cyclic and collective pitch control of the rotor blades; this mechanism, a variant of the swashplate-actuated rotor control, became a standard feature on helicopters. In 1935, the Gyroplane was manufactured at the Martin-Baker Aircraft Company's factory at Denham, Buckinghamshire. In autumn 1935, the Gyroplane, registered G-ADMV, first flew at Heston Aerodrome, piloted by V.H. Baker. On 6 February 1937, it flew at Hanworth Air Park, having been modified as the Mark 2 version. It was tested at Farnborough, and leased to the Royal Aircraft Establishment for research, but it was scrapped during the second world war. A two-seat A.R.IV and three-seat A.R.V were planned, but construction was stopped when Hafner was interned under Defence Regulation 18B.

== Variants ==
A.R.III
Prototype single-seat autogyro powered by a Pobjoy Niagara radial piston engine.
A.R.IV
Experimental rotorcraft to meet Air Ministry Specification S.22/38. Powered by a 210hp de Havilland Gipsy Six II engine, construction was started by Short Brothers as the Fleet Spotter, but was stopped in May 1940 when Hafner was interned.
A.R.V
Experimental rotorcraft to meet Air Ministry Specification S.22/38. Powered by a 210hp de Havilland Gipsy Six II engine, construction was started by Short Brothers as the Night Shadower, but was stopped in May 1940 when Hafner was interned.

== Specifications ==
Data from British Civil Aircraft since 1919 Volume

General characteristics

- Crew: one
- Length: 17 ft 10 in (5.44 m)
- Empty weight: 640 lb (290 kg)
- Gross weight: 900 lb (408 kg)
- Powerplant: 1 × Pobjoy Niagara , 90 hp (67 kW)
- Main rotor diameter: 32 ft 10 in (10.00 m)

Performance

- Maximum speed: 120 mph (190 km/h, 100 kn)

== See also ==
Related lists

- List of rotorcraft
