= Hanriot HD.2 =

French WW1 biplane floatplane fighter aircraft

HD.2, H.29
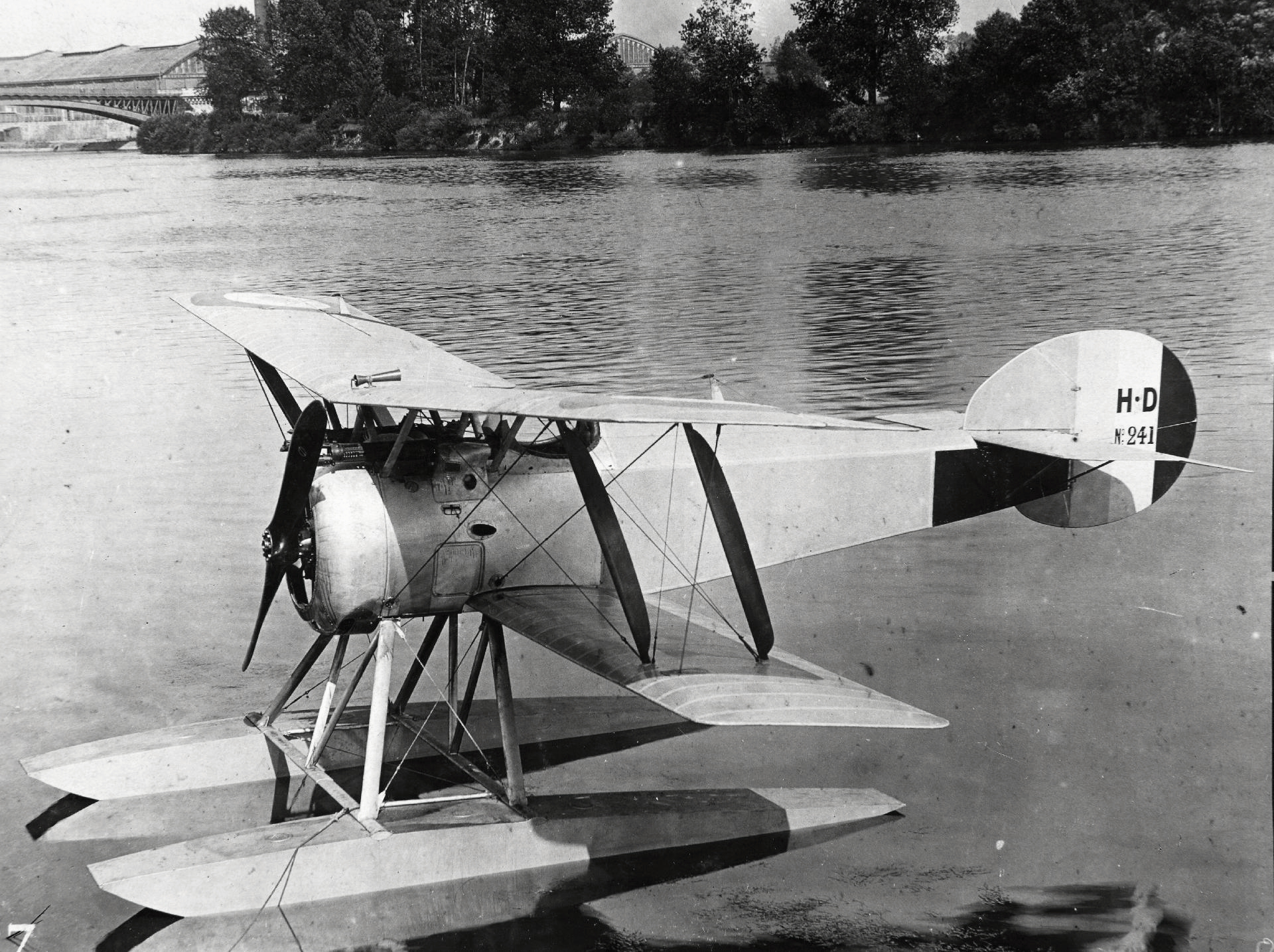

General information
- Type: Floatplane fighter
- National origin: France
- Manufacturer: Hanriot
- Primary users: Aéronautique Maritime United States Navy

History
- First flight: 1917; 108 years ago
- Developed from: Hanriot HD.1

The Hanriot HD.2 was a biplane floatplane fighter aircraft produced in France during the First World War that was used after the war for testing the use of aircraft from warships.

== Development ==
The design was based on that of the HD.1, but was a purpose-built floatplane. It had larger tail surfaces and a shorter wingspan with greater area. Like its predecessor, though, it was a conventional single-bay biplane with staggered wings of unequal span. The prototype had a twin pontoon undercarriage, with a small third pontoon under the tail. The third pontoon was later discarded on production machines, though.

== Operational history ==
The HD.2 was developed specifically as an interceptor to defend flying boat bases, but soon was used as an escort fighter to protect French reconnaissance flying boats. The United States Navy also bought 10 examples with wheeled undercarriages, designated HD.2C.

Both the French and United States navies used these aircraft in early experiments in launching fighters from warships. The United States Navy replicated the French trials where a HD.1 had been launched from a platform built atop one of the turrets of the battleship Paris and built a similar platform on the USS Mississippi to launch a HD.2 from. The French Navy converted some of their HD.2s to wheeled configuration and used them for trials on the new aircraft carrier Béarn.

A final experiment in launching a HD.2 from a ship was carried out in 1924 with two new-built examples designated H.29. An unorthodox launching system was developed where the aircraft were equipped with three small pulley-wheels, one on each tip of the upper wing, and one at the tip of the tail fin. These ran along metal rails that had been attached to project horizontally from the mast of the battleship Lorraine. This did not work as hoped, succeeding only in depositing the aircraft into the water below. Further trials were discontinued.

== Variants ==
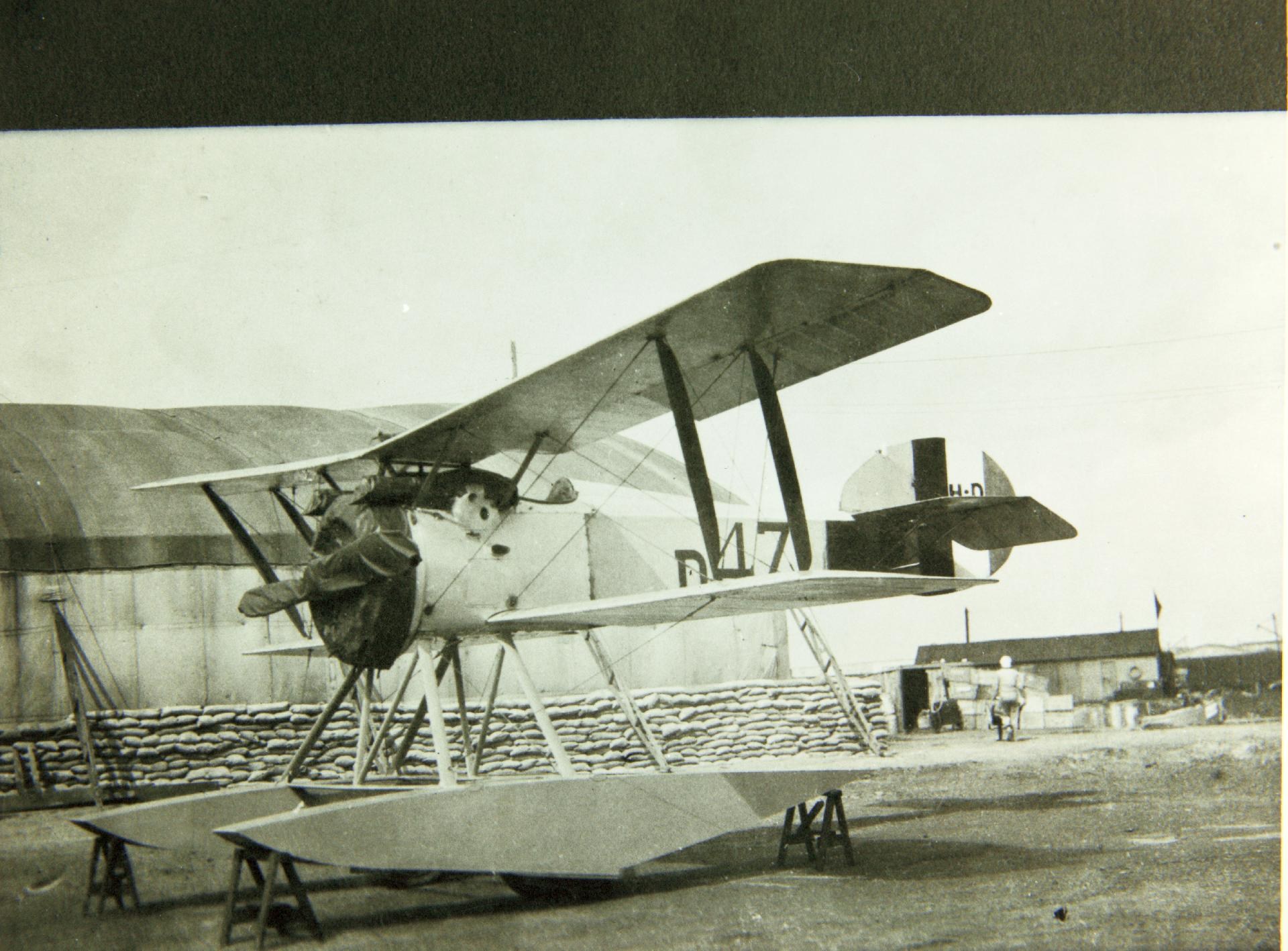
French Navy Hanriot HD.2 on beaching gear

HD.2
floatplane fighter with Clerget 9B engine
HD.2C
HD.2 with wheeled undercarriage (10 built for USN, plus 2 converted from HD.2 by French Navy)
HD.12
fitted with wheeled landing gear, powered by a 170-hp (127-kW) Le Rhône 9R rotary piston engine. (1 built)
HD.27
powered by a 180-hp (134-kW) Hispano-Suiza 8Ac engine. (1 built)
H.29
powered by a Hispano-Suiza 8Ab engine and fitted for launch from a warship (2 built)

== Operators ==
France

- French Navy
  - Aéronavale

United States

- United States Navy

== Specifications (HD.2) ==
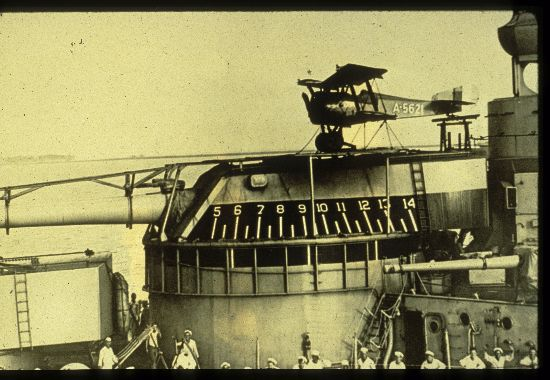
USN Hanriot HD.2C landplane on USS Mississippi's turret

General characteristics

- Crew: one pilot
- Length: 7.00 m (23 ft 0 in)
- Wingspan: 8.51 m (27 ft 11 in)
- Height: 3.10 m (10 ft 2 in)
- Wing area: 18.4 m^{2} (198 sq ft)
- Empty weight: 495 kg (1,092 lb)
- Gross weight: 700 kg (1,540 lb)
- Powerplant: 1 × Clêrget 9B , 100 kW (130 hp)

Performance

- Maximum speed: 182 km/h (113 mph, 98 kn)
- Range: 300 km (186 mi, 162 nmi)
- Service ceiling: 4,800 m (15,750 ft)

Armament

- 2 × fixed, forward-firing .303 Vickers machine guns

== See also ==
Aircraft of comparable role, configuration, and era

- Sopwith Baby
