= Hanriot H.180 =

H.170, H.180, and H.190
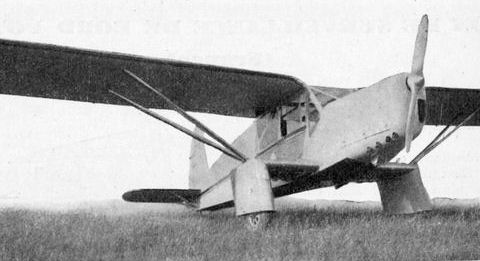
- H.180

General information
- Type: Utility aircraft
- National origin: France
- Manufacturer: Hanriot
- Designer: Montlaur
- Number built: 392

History
- First flight: 1934

The Hanriot H.170, H.180, and H.190 were a family of light utility aircraft produced in France in the 1930s. All introduced in 1934, they appeared side by side at the Paris Air Show that year, the model numbers distinguishing between versions powered by Salmson, Renault, and Régnier engines respectively.

== Design and development ==
In basic construction, the different variants were otherwise almost identical, as largely conventional monoplanes with high, strut-braced wings and fixed, tailskid undercarriage. The pilot and one or two passengers sat in an extensively-glazed, enclosed cabin.

Although usually described as a monoplane, this family of aircraft all featured small, stub wings at the bottom of the fuselage. These carried the fuel tanks and served as a mounting point for the wing struts and undercarriage. An interesting feature was that the upper portion of the rear fuselage was a removable module, allowing it to be replaced with alternative modules for different roles, for example to carry a stretcher, or a second, open cockpit for pilot or gunnery training.

== Operational history ==
The H.182 was the major production version, accounting for 346 out of the total of 392 aircraft built. Most of these were produced as part of a government order for machines to equip the Cercles Aériens Régionaux reserve flying units, with 172 aircraft still operational at the Fall of France in 1940.

Ten more were purchased by the Second Spanish Republic for use in the Spanish Civil War, and 50 aircraft originally ordered by the French government were diverted to Turkey as part of a military aid agreement.

== Variants ==
=== H.170 ===
- H.170 - two-seat military observation version with Salmson 6Te engine (1 built)
- H.171 - three-seat civil tourer version of H.170 (1 built)
- H.172
  - H.172B - two-seat trainer (1 built)
  - H.172N - three-seat tourer (7 built)
- H.173 - aerobatic trainer version (1 built)
- H.174 - three-seat trainer (1 built)
- H.175 - liaison aircraft for French Navy (10 built)

=== H.180 ===
- H.180
  - H.180T - three-seat tourer with Renault 4Pdi engine (1 built)
  - H.180M - two-seat military observation version with Renault 4Pei engine (1 built)
- H.181 - air ambulance version of H.180T (1 built)
- H.182 - main production version as trainer aircraft for French reserve aviation units.
- H.183 - aerobatic trainer with Renault 438 engine (1 built)
- H.184 - trainer version with uprated version of Renault 4Pei engine (1 built)
- H.185 - two-seat liaison version for French navy (6 built)

=== H.190 ===
- H.190
  - H.190M - two-seat observation aircraft with Régnier 60-01 engine (1 built)
- H.191 - three-seat tourer (1 built)
- H.192
  - H.192B - two-seat trainer (1 built)
  - H.192N - two-seat civil trainer with Régnier 6Bo.1 engine (9 built)
- H.195 - two-seat liaison aircraft with Régnier 6Bo.1 engine (1 built)

== Operators ==
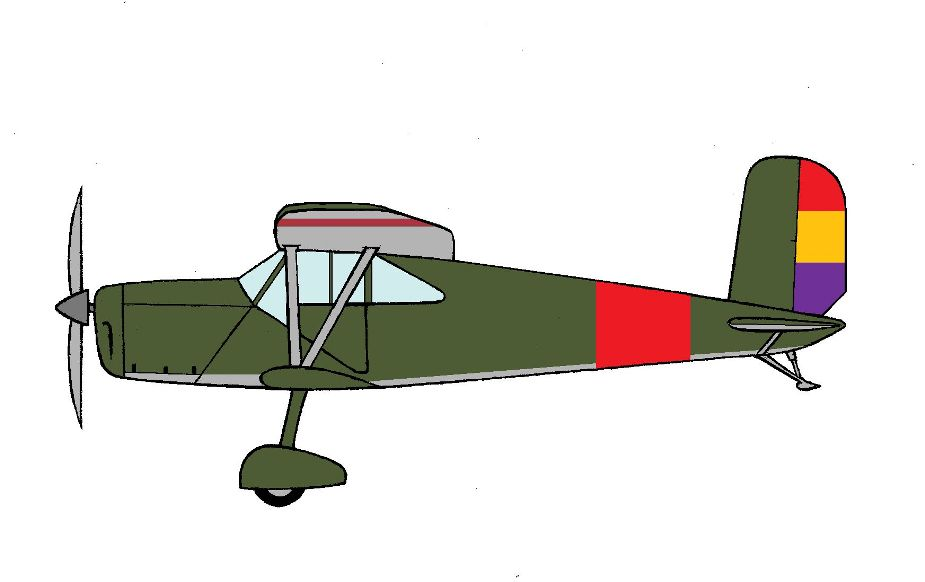
Hanriot H.182 trainer of the Spanish Republican Air Force

France

- French Air Force
- French Navy

Spain

- Spanish Republican Air Force

Turkey

- Turkish Air Force

== Specifications (H.182) ==
General characteristics

- Crew: Two, pilot and instructor
- Length: 7.22 m (23 ft 8 in)
- Wingspan: 12.00 m (39 ft 5 in)
- Height: 3.15 m (10 ft 4 in)
- Wing area: 19.0 m^{2} (204 sq ft)
- Empty weight: 604 kg (1,331 lb)
- Gross weight: 887 kg (1,955 lb)
- Powerplant: 1 × Renault 4Pei , 104 kW (140 hp)

Performance

- Maximum speed: 190 km/h (120 mph, 100 kn)
- Range: 600 km (370 mi, 320 nmi)
- Service ceiling: 5,500 m (18,400 ft)

== See also ==
Related lists

- List of Interwar military aircraft
- List of aircraft of the Spanish Republican Air Force
