= Hegy R.C.H.I. El Chuparosa =

Hegy R.C.H.I. “El Chuparosa”
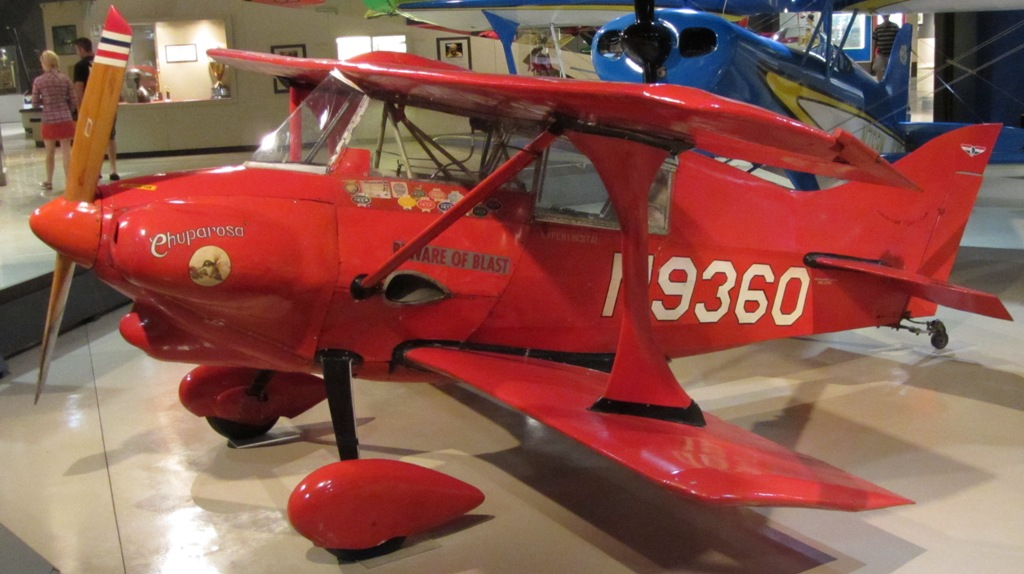
- Hegy R.C.H.I. El Chuparosa on display

General information
- Type: Homebuilt aircraft
- National origin: United States of America
- Designer: Ray Hegy

History
- First flight: 1 May 1959

The Hegy "El Chuparosa" (English: Hummingbird) is a homebuilt, enclosed-cockpit biplane that was designed in the early 1950s.

== Design and development ==
The aircraft was designed to be a low-cost, high performance aircraft. The Ray Hegy design used full size wall drawings and wooden mock-ups. The aircraft was started in February 1950 and finished in May 1959 with the prototype displayed at the Rockford EAA Fly-In in 1960.

"El Chuparosa" is a single place biplane featuring a short fuselage with a tail swept to a sharp tip. The fuselage cross section was based on the Heath Parasol design. The fuselage was constructed from welded steel tubing, with wooden wing spars from a J-3 Cub, the ailerons were made from 1929 Douglas O-38 rudders and the engine cheeks cowlings were made from Fairchild 24 wheelpants. The cockpit is enclosed.

== Operational history ==
The prototype "El Chuparosa" was donated to the EAA Airventure Museum in Oshkosh, Wisconsin on August 14, 1977.

== Specifications (Hegy R.C.H.I. “El Chuparosa”) ==
Data from Sport Aviation

General characteristics

- Crew: one
- Length: 14 ft 1 in (4.29 m)
- Wingspan: 12 ft 10 in (3.91 m)
- Wing area: 72 sq ft (6.7 m^{2})
- Empty weight: 478 lb (217 kg)
- Fuel capacity: 19 U.S. gallons (72 L; 16 imp gal)
- Powerplant: 1 × Continental A-65 , 65 hp (48 kW)

Performance

- Cruise speed: 96 kn (110 mph, 180 km/h)
- Stall speed: 52 kn (60 mph, 97 km/h)

== See also ==
Aircraft of comparable role, configuration, and era

- Sorrell Hiperlight
