= John Emery Harriman =

American civil engineer and inventor (1869–1916)

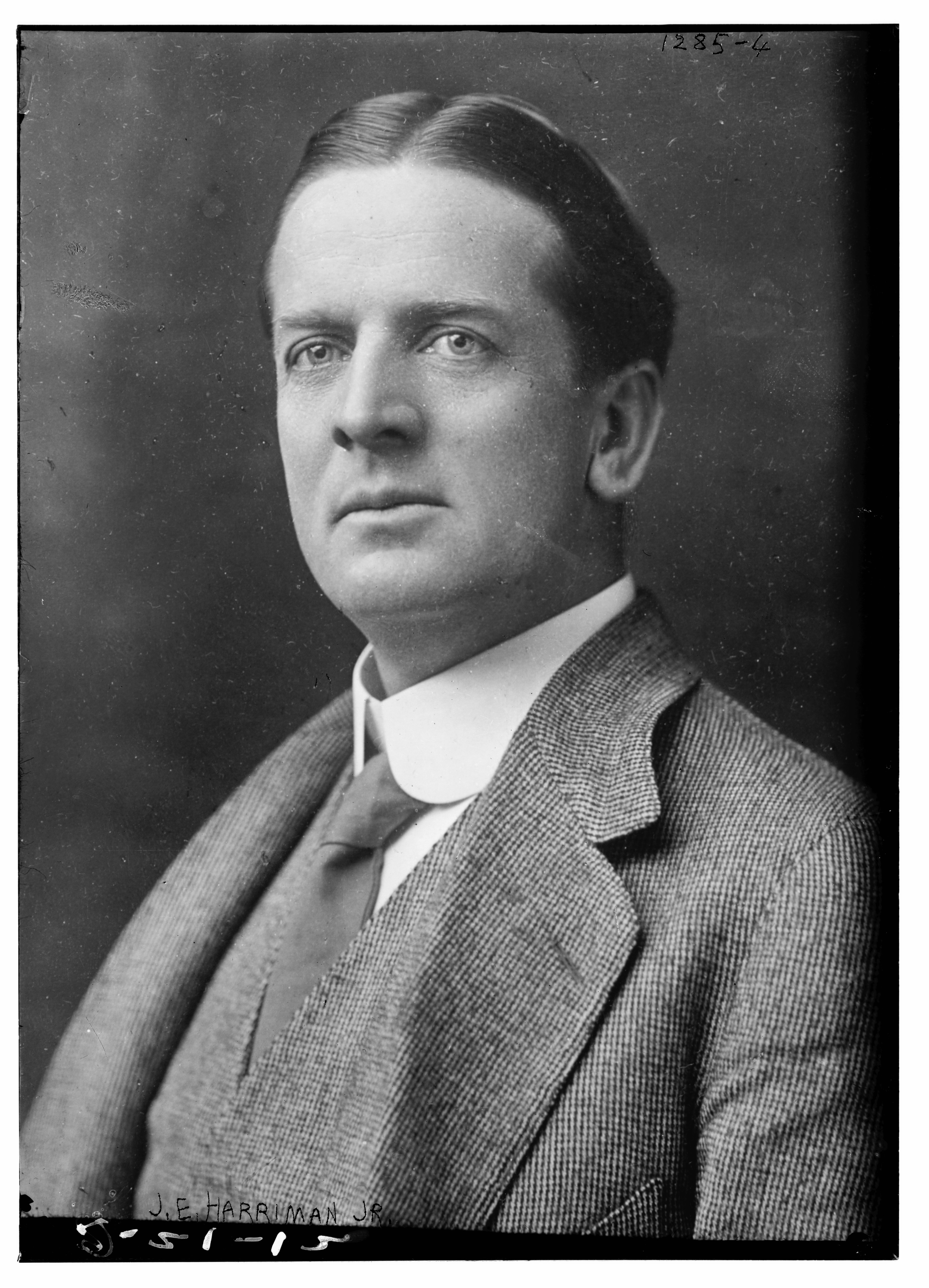
- Harriman in 1900, image from Library of Congress
- Born: John Emery Harriman, Jr. June 3, 1869; Somerville, Massachusetts
- Died: February 26, 1912 (aged 42); Worcester, Massachusetts
- Occupations: Civil engineer; inventor
- Known for: Patenting an aerocar
- Spouse: Julia Horther (m. 1897)
- Parent(s): J. E. Harriman Sr. (father); J. W. Harriman (mother)

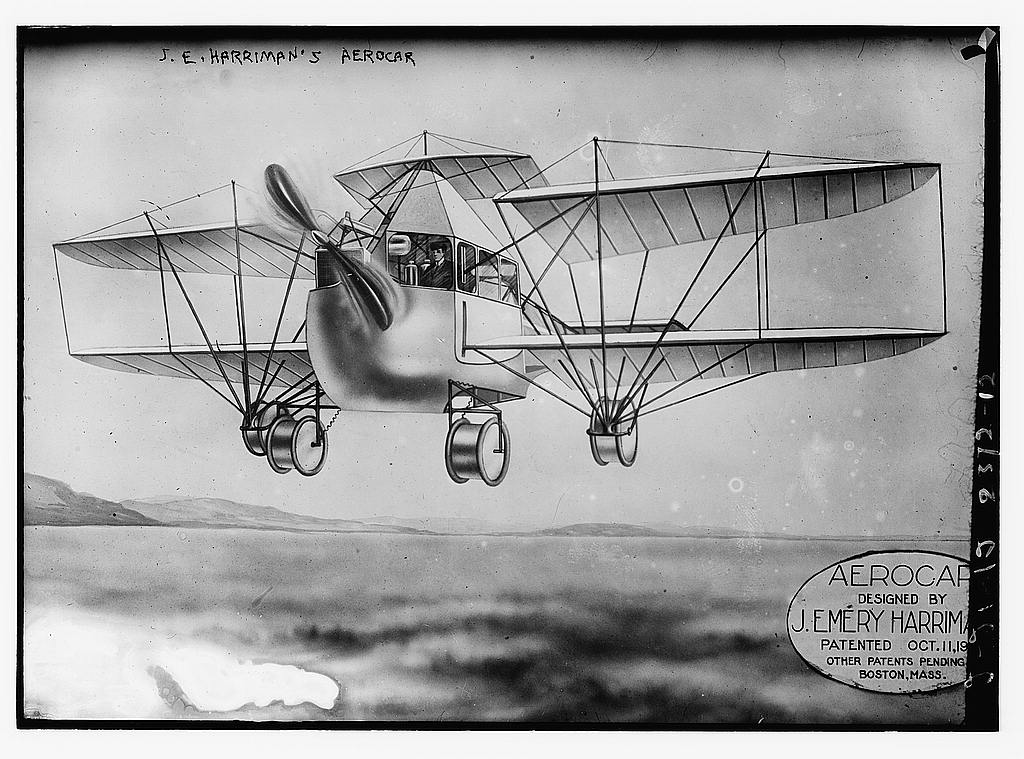
J. E. Harriman's Aerocar

John Emery Harriman, Jr. (June 3, 1869 — May 18, 1916) was an American civil engineer and inventor.

== Biography ==
Harriman was born in 1869 in Somerville, Massachusetts, to John Emery Harriman, Sr., a Civil War veteran of the 6th Massachusetts Regiment, and Sarah Jane Wheeler Harriman. His paternal family went back eight generations to 1622, when the Harrimans left Rowley, Yorkshire, England.

He created the Harriman Aeromobile Company and designed a flying machine in 1902. He also designed an aerocar in 1906, which was patented in 1910, but was never manufactured. He also invented a rotary steam engine.

He married Julia C. Horther, ex-wife of artist Hiram Peabody Flagg, on April 22, 1897. He died at his home in Brookline, Massachusetts, aged 46, after a brief illness.

== Publications ==
- A flying machine of safety, stability, adaptability: the Harriman type aeromobile and aerocar
