= Hansa-Brandenburg W.13 =

1910s German flying boat

W.13
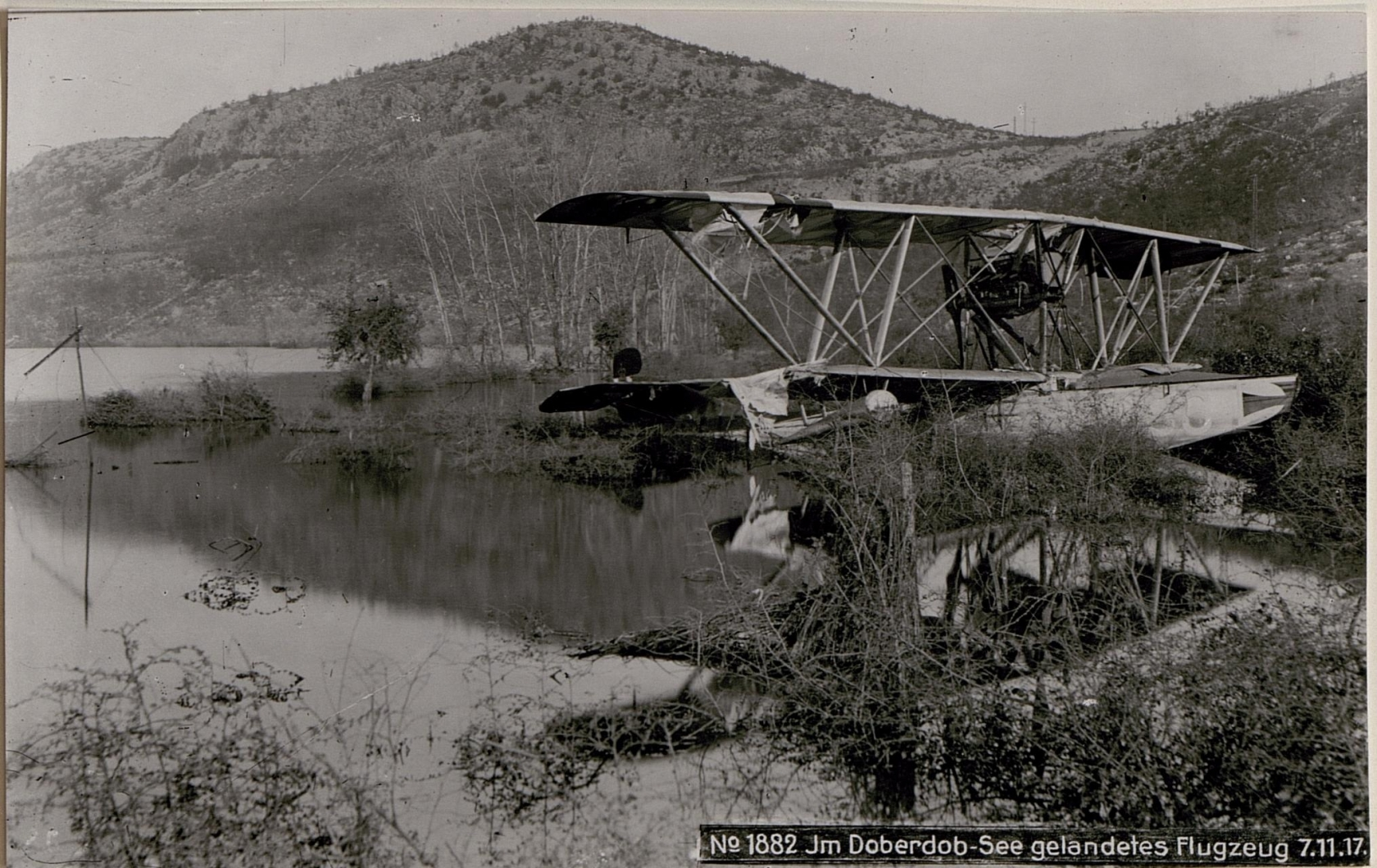

General information
- Type: Flying boat bomber
- National origin: Germany
- Manufacturer: Hansa-Brandenburg, Ufag
- Designer: Ernst Heinkel
- Primary user: Austro-Hungarian Navy
- Number built: 130

History
- First flight: 1917

The Hansa-Brandenburg W.13 was a flying boat bomber developed in Germany in 1917 and used by the Austro-Hungarian Navy during World War I.

== Design and development ==
The W.13 was a largely conventional design for the time, with a single-step hull and an engine mounted pusher-fashion on struts in the interplane gap. The pilot and a gunner sat in tandem open cockpits at the bow. The interplane struts were unusual in that on each side of the aircraft, the upper and lower wings were braced with two pairs of struts that converged from two sets of attachment points on the upper wing to a single set on the lower wing, so that when viewed from fore or aft, the struts formed a V-shape.

== Operational history ==
The type was first offered to the Imperial German Navy, but was rejected. It was, however, accepted by the Austro-Hungarian Navy, which operated it from bases on the Adriatic Sea during the Italian Campaign. Many of these were produced under licence by UFAG in Budapest. In service, the Austro-Daimler engine caused continuous problems, which the manufacturer attributed to the poor lubricating oil available at the front. Since this situation seemed unlikely to change as the war situation deteriorated for Austria-Hungary, Austro-Daimler simply discontinued production of the engine, meaning that slightly over half the 130 W.13s manufactured were left without a powerplant.

Several examples of the W.13 were captured intact by Italian forces and studied; and one example that survived the war was handed over by Austria to the United States Navy as part of war reparations. This aircraft was shipped back to the Naval Aircraft Factory in the United States, where it was dismantled for study, reassembled, and test flown.

== Specifications ==
General characteristics

- Crew: Two, pilot and gunner
- Length: 13.70 m (44 ft 11 in)
- Wingspan: 20.40 m (66 ft 11 in)
- Height: 4.23 m (14 ft 11 in)
- Gross weight: 2,850 kg (6,280 lb)
- Powerplant: 1 × Austro-Daimler 360hp , 270 kW (360 hp)

Performance

- Maximum speed: 150 km/h (94 mph, 82 kn)
- Range: 950 km (600 mi, 520 nmi)
- Service ceiling: 2,000 m (610 ft)

Armament

- 1 × trainable machine-gun in open position in bow
- Bombs
