= Lorraine Hanriot LH.130 =

LH.130
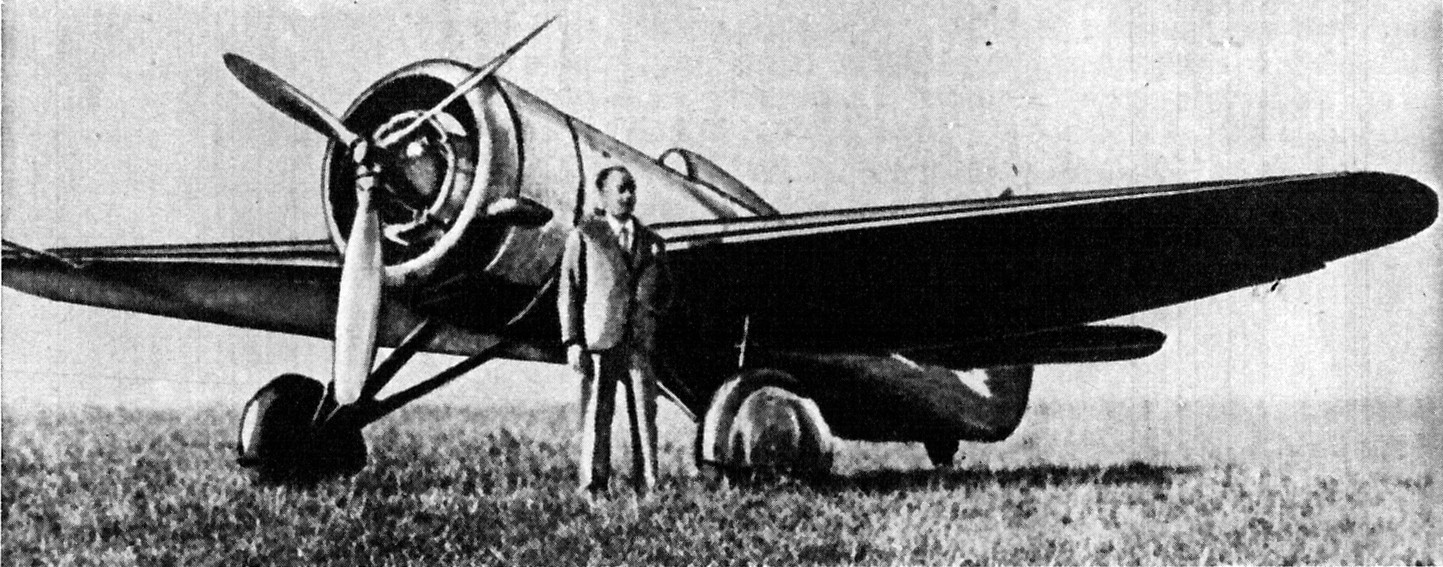
- Hanriot H.131

General information
- Type: Racer, fighter-trainer and high-speed mailplane
- National origin: France
- Manufacturer: Lorraine Hanriot
- Designer: Louis Montlaur
- Number built: 1

History
- First flight: 22 December 1932

The Lorraine Hanriot LH.130 is a French racing aircraft designed and built in the early 1930s, to compete in the Coupe Michelin air races.

== Design and development ==
Following on from the earlier Lorraine Hanriot LH.42 racing aircraft, Monsieur Louis Montlaur, at the behest of Lorraine Hanriot's parent organisation, the Société Générale Aéronautique (SGA), designed an aircraft with metal structure and skinning of similar layout to the LH.42. The mid-set monoplane wings had a single metal spar supporting wooden ribs which were fabric covered aft of the metal-skinned leading edge. The fuselage was a built up Duralumin structure with sheet metal skinning

The undercarriage consisted of strut mounted wide-track main gear with faired wheels, Hanriot Spécial oleo-pneumatic shock-absorbers and a steel tail skid.

Power for the HL.130 was supplied by a single 170 kW (230 hp) Lorraine 9Nb 9-cylinder radial engine (serial no. 62003), driving a two-bladed fixed-pitch Levasseur Series 401M propeller (serial no. 5378), cowled with a close fitting NACA cowling .

The 1933 Coupe Michelin air race was to be held from 1 March to 31 October 1933, but the race regulations were changed early in 1933 removing limitations on engine power and increasing the course length. The LH.130 was not competitive and was withdrawn from the competition.

=== LH.131 ===
To comply with the new regulations Lorraine Hanriot re-designed and converted the LH.130 to be powered by a 340 kW (450 hp) Gnome-Rhône 9 Kbrs Mistral supercharged engine, designated LH.131-01. A semi-enclosed cockpit was also introduced along with other improvements; such as increased control surface area and an attempt at boundary layer control in the region of the cockpit; using small holes in the skin to allow turbulent air to be drawn into the fuselage.

After failing to compete in the 1933 Coupe Michelin, Lorraine Hanriot developed the LH.131 further by adding a retractable undercarriage. The main gear folded rearwards into nacelles under the wings, similar to the Seversky P-35, unfortunately this was manually actuated which required considerable effort from the pilot and was also a distraction at a critical stage in flight. Power for the LH.131-02 was provided by a 350 kW (470 hp) Lorraine Algol Major.

== Operational history ==
Before the first flight, the LH.130-01 was displayed at the XIII-th Paris Air Salon (Salon Aéronautique Paris), held from 18 November to 4 December 1932, eliciting a visit form French President Albert Lebrun. After the Salon ended the aircraft was transferred to Villacoublay where the first flight took place on 22 December 1932.

Flight testing revealed vibration from the engine mounts, which were reinforced and a certificate of airworthiness was issued on 12 May 1933 along with the civil registration F-AOFV.

The changes to the LH.130-01 were not completed in time for the aircraft to compete in the Coupe Michelin, which was won by Michelle Detrua in a Morane-Saulnier MS.234/2 at an average speed of 222.537 km/h (120.160 kn; 138.278 mph).

Flight testing of the LH.131 prototypes failed to demonstrate advantage over the competition, so aspirations for the LH.131 filling the fighter-trainer or mail-plane roles did not bear fruit. Attempts to break records for speed over a closed circuit in late 1933 failed due to bad weather, after which the LH.131 was largely abandoned.

== Variants ==
LH.130-01
The first prototype, powered by a 170 kW (230 hp) Lorraine 9Nb 9-cylinder radial engine. Converted to the LH.131-01 after changes to the regulations for the Coupe Michelin air races in 1933.
LH.131-01
The LH.130 modified with a 340 kW (450 hp) Gnome-Rhône 9Kbrs Mistral, semi-enclosed cockpit, boundary layer control drag reduction measures and enlarged control surfaces.
LH.131-02
The LH.131-01 modified to have a retractable main undercarriage, powered by a 350 kW (470 hp) Lorraine Algol Major (Type 120).

== Specifications (LH.130) ==
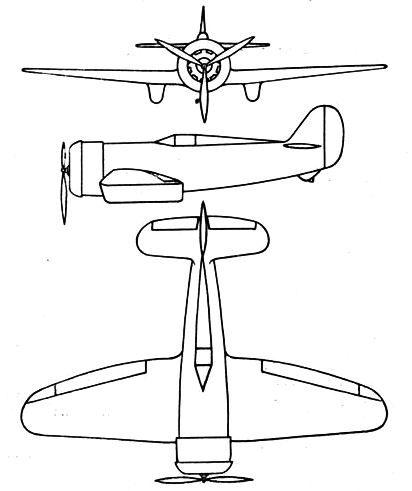
Lorraine Hanriot LH.131 3-view drawing from L'Aerophile April 1934

Data from Revue de la Société Générale Aéronautique

General characteristics

- Crew: 1
- Length: 7 m (23 ft 0 in)
- Wingspan: 10 m (32 ft 10 in)
- Height: 3.1 m (10 ft 2 in)
- Wing area: 16.6 m^{2} (179 sq ft)
- Airfoil: root:Hanriot 18%; tip Hanriot 12%
- Empty weight: 865 kg (1,907 lb)
- Gross weight: 1,075 kg (2,370 lb)
- Fuel capacity: fuel:106 kg (234 lb) (150 L (40 US gal; 33 imp gal)); oil:12 kg (26 lb)
- Powerplant: 1 × Lorraine 9Nb 9-cylinder air-cooled radial piston engine, 220 kW (300 hp)

Performance

- Maximum speed: 303 km/h (188 mph, 164 kn) at Sea level
- 300 km/h (160 kn; 190 mph) at1,000 m (3,300 ft)
- 296 km/h (160 kn; 184 mph) at2,000 m (6,600 ft)
- Cruise speed: 250 km/h (160 mph, 130 kn)
- Stall speed: 95 km/h (59 mph, 51 kn)
- Range: 650 km (400 mi, 350 nmi)
- Service ceiling: 8,500 m (27,900 ft)
- Time to altitude: *1,000 m (3,300 ft) in 2 minutes 10 seconds
- 2,000 m (6,600 ft) in 4 minutes 36 seconds
- 3,000 m (9,800 ft) in 7 minutes 15 seconds
- 4,000 m (13,000 ft) in 10 minutes 03 seconds
- Wing loading: 63 kg/m^{2} (13 lb/sq ft)
- Power/mass: 0.213 kW/kg (0.0265 hp/lb)

== Bibliography ==
- Cony, Christophe & Faucard, Pascal (November 2001). "Photoscope: les bolide de course Hanriot 130/131" [Photospread: The Hanriot 130/131 Racers]. Avions: Toute l'Aéronautique et son histoire (in French) (104): 26–28. ISSN 1243-8650.
- Cortet, Pierre (August 2001). "Marcel Haegelen et les Lorraine-Hanriot 41/42/130/131" [Marcel Haegelen and the Lorraine-Hanriot 41/42/130/131]. Avions: Toute l'Aéronautique et son histoire (in French) (101): 39–47. ISSN 1243-8650.
