= Harmening's High Flyers =

American powered parachute manufacturer

- Company type: Privately held company
- Industry: Aerospace
- Founded: 1988
- Founder: Mike Harmening
- Defunct: circa 2008
- Fate: Out of business
- Headquarters: Genoa, Illinois, United States
- Products: Kit aircraft

Harmening's High Flyers was an American aircraft manufacturer founded by Mike Harmening. It was originally based in Genoa, Illinois and later in Big Stone City, South Dakota. The company specialized in the design and manufacture of powered parachutes in the form of kits for amateur construction and ready-to-fly aircraft in the US FAR 103 Ultralight Vehicles rules.

The company was founded in 1988 and seems to have gone out of business in 2008.

Harmening's produced a whole range of powered parachutes including the base model High Flyer, Standard, Deluxe, Premiere, Executive and the High Five, all variants of the same basic design.

== Aircraft ==
Summary of aircraft built by Harmening's High Flyers
Model name	First flight	Number built	Type
Harmening High Flyer			Powered parachute
High Flyer Standard		25 (2000)	Powered parachute
High Flyer Deluxe		25 (2000)	Powered parachute
High Flyer Premiere		30 (2000)	Powered parachute
High Flyer Executive		30 (2000)	Powered parachute
High Five		10 (2000)	Powered parachute
