= La Mouette =

French aircraft manufacturer

- Company type: Private company
- Industry: Aerospace
- Founded: 1974
- Founder: Gérard Thevenot and Jean-Marc Thevenot
- Headquarters: Fontaine-lès-Dijon, France
- Products: Hang gliders, ultralight trikes, paramotors, paragliders, powered parachutes
- Divisions: Helite
- Website: www.lamouette.com

La Mouette (English: Seagull) is a French aircraft manufacturer headquartered in Fontaine-lès-Dijon. The company specializes in the design and manufacture of hang gliders, paragliders and ultralight trikes. At one time they also produced paramotors.

Founded in 1974 by brothers Gérard Thevenot and Jean-Marc Thevenot, the company was formed to produce versions of the American Seagull hang glider. Their glider was named La Mouette, after which the company was named. In 1979 they produced the La Mouette Atlas which remained in production through 2012 and of which there are over 8000 examples flying.

In 1986 the company started building paramotors and in 1995 introduced the "topless" hang glider, deleting the kingpost and upper flying wires.

In 2010-11 the company developed an electric aircraft, the Samson.

The company also built a rigid wing hang glider, the Tsunami and a powered parachute, the Skydancer under the brand Helite. Helite is today a company that specializes in air bag designs.

== Aircraft ==
Summary of aircraft built by La Mouette
Model name	First flight	Number built	Type
Atlas	1979	more than 8000	hang glider
Profil			hang glider
Hermes			hang glider
Racer			hang glider
Sphinx			hang glider
Top Model			hang glider
Topless	1995		hang glider
Top Secret			hang glider
Helite Tsunami			rigid wing hang glider
Cosmos			ultralight trike
O2B			ultralight trike
Revo			ultralight trike
Samson			ultralight trike
Skybike			paramotor
SR 210	mid-2000s		paramotor
ZR 250	mid-2000s		paramotor
Helite Skydancer			powered parachute
