= Heldeberg Designs =

American aircraft manufacturer

- Company type: Private company
- Industry: Aerospace
- Founded: 1996
- Fate: Out of business 2010
- Headquarters: Altamont, New York, United States
- Products: Powered parachutes
- Divisions: Blue Heron Powered Parachutes
- Website: www.blueheronppc.com

Heldeberg Designs was an American aircraft manufacturer, headquartered in Altamont, New York. The company specialized in powered parachutes.

Originally marketing under its own name, the company marketed its aircraft under the band name Blue Heron Powered Parachutes.

The company ceased manufacturing the Blue Heron line of powered parachutes in 2010. By early 2013 the company website stated: "After over 17 years of serving the aviation community, Heldeberg Designs LLC is wrapping up it's [sic] operations and will no longer be manufacturing Blue Heron Powered Parachutes nor parts. We would like to thank all of our patrons and feel fortunate to have made so many friends around the world."

== Aircraft ==
Summary of aircraft built by Heldeberg Designs
Model name	First flight	Number built	Type
Blue Heron Convertible			powered parachute
Blue Heron Marathon			powered parachute
Blue Heron Spirit 103			powered parachute
