= Hernandez Rapier 65 =

General information
- Type: Biplane
- National origin: United States of America
- Designer: Frank Hernandez
- Number built: 1

History
- Introduction date: 1960

The Rapier 65 is a homebuilt biplane designed by Frank Hernandez.

== Design ==
The plane's fuselage is constructed of welded steel tubing with fabric covering. The wingspars are made of wood, with fabric covering. Ailerons are on the lower wings only.

== Specifications (Rapier 65) ==
Data from Sport Aviation

General characteristics

- Capacity: 1
- Length: 17 ft 3 in (5.26 m)
- Wingspan: 20 ft (6.1 m)
- Height: 5 ft 4 in (1.63 m)
- Wing area: 129 sq ft (12.0 m^{2})
- Airfoil: RAF 32
- Empty weight: 678 lb (308 kg)
- Powerplant: 1 × Continental A-65-1 , 65 hp (48 kW)

Performance

- Maximum speed: 96 kn (110 mph, 180 km/h)
