= Haufe Buzzer 2 =

American motorglider

Buzzer 2

General information
- Type: Motor glider
- National origin: United States
- Designer: Walter Haufe
- Status: Production completed
- Primary user: Walter Haufe
- Number built: one

History
- Introduction date: 1975
- Developed from: Haufe Ha-S-2 Buzzer

The Haufe Buzzer 2 is an American high-wing, strut-braced single-seat motor glider that was designed and constructed by Walter Haufe.

== Design and development ==
After Haufe's earlier Buzzer was deemed less than successful, due to the insufficiently reliable Nelson Aircraft engine, Haufe retired that design and designed a new aircraft, which became the Buzzer 2. Intended to be a cross between a conventional sailplane and a light aircraft the aircraft was built with a 34 ft (10.4 m) wing span and has a 16:1 glide ratio.

The Buzzer 2 is constructed with a welded steel tube fuselage and a wooden wing, all covered with doped aircraft fabric covering. The relatively low 8:1 aspect ratio wing uses a single spar and is supported by a single lift strut. The wing employs a modified NACA 2412 airfoil. The landing gear is a fixed monowheel and two wing-mounted outrigger wheels that support the wing during taxiing. The engine is a Curtiss snowmobile engine that turns at a maximum rpm of 6000, powering the propeller through an oil-immersed 2:1 chain reduction drive, giving a propeller speed of 3000 rpm.

Only one Buzzer 2 was constructed.

== Operational history ==
Haufe reported that the aircraft uses 600 ft (183 m) to take-off and climbs at about 500 feet per minute (2.5 m/s). The aircraft was still on the US Federal Aviation Administration registry in July 2011, registered in the Experimental - Amateur-built category.

== Specifications (Buzzer 2) ==
Data from Sailplane Directory and Soaring

General characteristics

- Crew: one
- Wingspan: 34 ft 0 in (10.36 m)
- Wing area: 124 sq ft (11.5 m^{2})
- Aspect ratio: 8:1
- Airfoil: NACA 2412 modified
- Empty weight: 390 lb (177 kg)
- Gross weight: 600 lb (272 kg)
- Powerplant: 1 × Curtiss two stroke snowmobile engine

Performance

- Maximum glide ratio: 16:1
- Rate of climb: 500 ft/min (2.5 m/s)
- Wing loading: 4.8 lb/sq ft (23 kg/m^{2})

== See also ==
- List of gliders
