= Hanriot LH.10 =

LH.10-LH.16
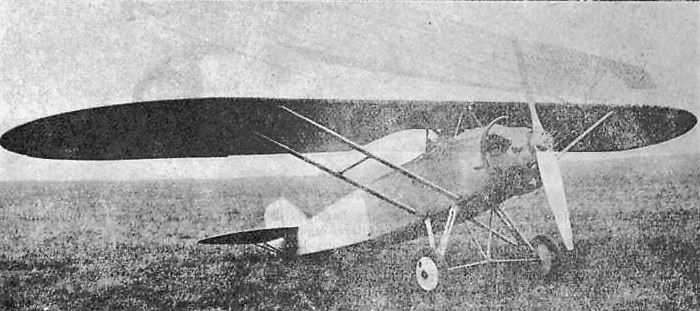
- LH.10

General information
- Type: Civil trainer aircraft
- National origin: France
- Manufacturer: Hanriot
- Primary user: Armée de l'Air
- Number built: 54

History
- First flight: 1930

The Lorraine-Hanriot LH.10 was a family of training monoplanes built in France in the early 1930s, the most widely produced and well-known member of which was the LH.16, later known simply as the Hanriot H.16. It was a conventional parasol-wing monoplane with fixed tailskid undercarriage, the main units of which were mounted on outriggers attached to the wing struts. The pilot and instructor sat in tandem open cockpits.

Early members of the family all had radial engines, but the definitive LH.16 of 1933 had an inline engine within a neat cowling. This type was evaluated by the Armée de l'Air and an initial order for 60 machines was placed. This was soon amended to just 15 in the original trainer configuration, plus another 29 modified as observation aircraft with a mounting for a trainable machine gun in the rear cockpit. Following a brief career in military service, the H.16s were turned over to the Aviation Populaire for use as trainers.

== Variants ==
- LH.10 - initial version with Lorraine 5Pa engine (2 built)
- LH.11 - version with Lorraine 5Pb engine (2 built)
  - LH.11bis
- LH.12 - version with Salmson 9Ac engine (1 built)
- LH.13 - version with Lorraine 5Pb engine (5 built)
- LH.16 - definitive version with Renault 4Pdi engine (15 built)
  - H.16/1 - armed observation version of H.16 (29 built)

== Operators ==
France

- French Air Force

== Specifications (LH.16) ==
General characteristics

- Crew: Two, pilot and instructor
- Length: 8.28 m (26 ft 3 in)
- Wingspan: 11.90 m (39 ft 1 in)
- Height: 2.62 m (8 ft 8 in)
- Wing area: 22.0 m^{2} (237 sq ft)
- Empty weight: 547 kg (1,206 lb)
- Gross weight: 886 kg (1,953 lb)
- Powerplant: 1 × Renault 4Pdi , 90 kW (120 hp)

Performance

- Maximum speed: 155 km/h (96 mph, 83 kn)
- Range: 375 km (233 mi, 202 nmi)
- Service ceiling: 4,200 m (13,800 ft)
