= Hanriot HD.14 =

1920s French military trainer aircraft

HD.14
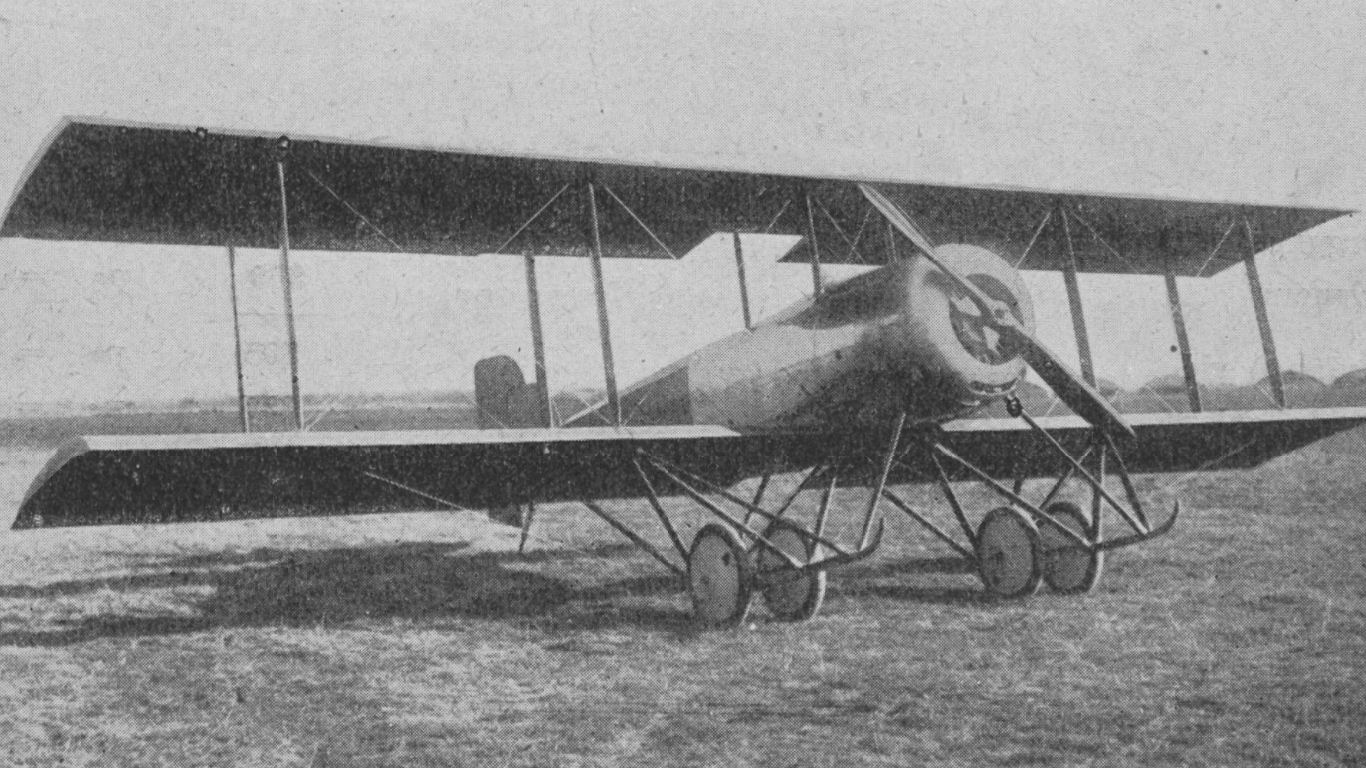

General information
- Type: Trainer
- National origin: France
- Manufacturer: Hanriot
- Primary users: Aéronautique Militaire Imperial Japanese Army Air Force, Polish Air Force, Soviet Air Force
- Number built: ca. 2,100

History
- First flight: 1920

The Hanriot HD.14 was a military trainer aircraft produced in large numbers in France during the 1920s. It was a conventional, two-bay biplane with unstaggered wings of equal span. The pilot and instructor sat in tandem, open cockpits, and the fuselage was braced to the lower wing with short struts. The main units of the fixed tailskid undercarriage were divided, each unit carrying two wheels, and early production examples also had anti-noseover skids projecting forwards as well.

In 1922, production shifted to a much improved version, known as the HD.14ter or HD.14/23. This featured a smaller wing area, and revised tail fin, interplane and cabane struts, and fuselage cross-section. The landing gear track was narrowed in order to facilitate the aircraft's loading onto the standard army trailer of the day.

Incredibly prolific (the Aéronautique Militaire alone operated 1,925 examples), it was also licence-produced by Mitsubishi in Japan, where another 145 were built, and by the CWL and Samolot in Poland, where respectively 125 and 120 were built (designated locally as H.28).

== Variants ==
- HD.14 - Original production version. Also known as the HD.14 EP2.
- HD.14ter - Improved version of 1922. Also known as the HD.14/23.
- HD.14S (Sanitaire) - Air ambulance version
- HD.141 - Remanufactured ex-Army HD.14s for French aeroclub use
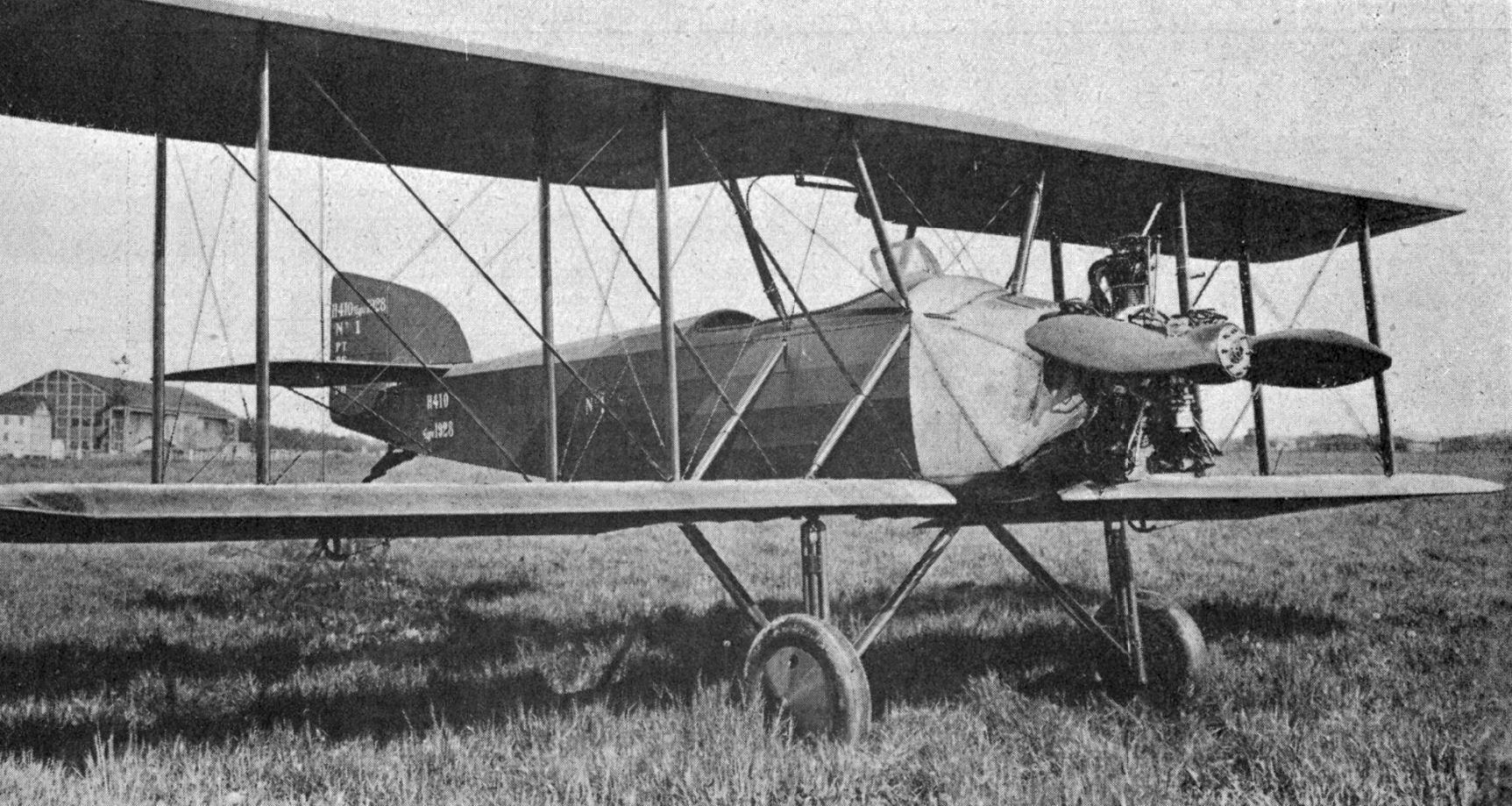
  Hanriot H.410 E.P.2 photo from L'Aéronautique June,1928
- H.410 - A 1928 development with Lorraine 5-cyl radial and revised undercarriage.
- H.411 - development of the HD.410
- LH.412 - development of the HD.410
- H.28 - Polish designation of license-produced slightly modified HD.14/23
- Ki N°1 - Japanese Army designation of the Hanriot HD.14 built under licence by Mitsubishi

== Operators ==
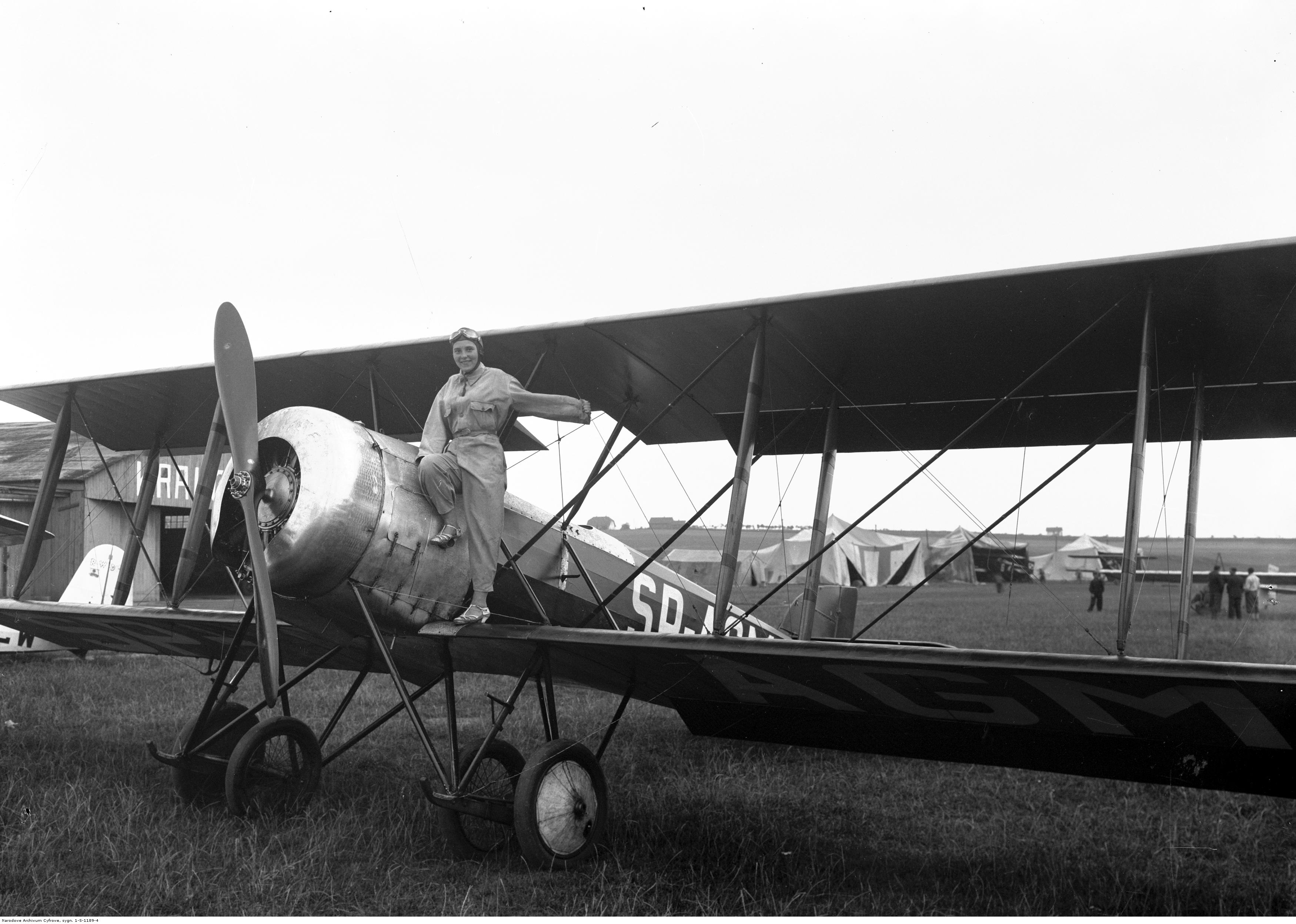
Hanriot H.28 in Poland

Belgium

- Belgian Air Force

France

- Aéronautique Militaire

Japan

- Imperial Japanese Army Air Force (145, licence-built by Mitsubishi)

Estonia

- Estonian Air Force (2)

Poland

- Polish Air Force (295, including 245 licence-built H-28)

Romania

- Royal Romanian Air Force (15)

Soviet Union

- Soviet Air Force (30)

Bulgaria

- Bulgarian Air Force

Mexico
Spain

== Specifications (HD.14, early production) ==
General characteristics

- Crew: Two, pilot and instructor
- Length: 7.26 m (23 ft 10 in)
- Wingspan: 10.87 m (35 ft 8 in)
- Height: 3.00 m (9 ft 10 in)
- Wing area: 34.5 m^{2} (370 sq ft)
- Gross weight: 810 kg (1,786 lb)
- Powerplant: 1 × Le Rhône 9 , 60 kW (80 hp)

Performance

- Maximum speed: 110 km/h (68 mph, 59 kn)
- Range: 180 km (112 mi, 97 nmi)
- Service ceiling: 4,000 m (13,125 ft)

== See also ==
Related lists

- List of Interwar military aircraft

== Bibliography ==
- Anderson, Lennart (November–December 2019). "La renaissance de l'aviation militair bulgare dans les années vingt" [The Rebirth of Bulgarian Military Aviation in the Twenties]. Avions (in French) (232): 52–66. ISSN 1243-8650.
- Kotelnikov, V.; Kulikov, V. & Cony, C. (December 2001). "Les avions français en URSS, 1921–1941" [French Aircraft in the USSR, 1921–1941]. Avions: Toute l'Aéronautique et son histoire (in French) (105): 50–56. ISSN 1243-8650.
- Morgała, Andrzej (2003). Samoloty wojskowe w Polsce 1924-1939 (in Polish). Warsaw: Bellona. ISBN 83-11-09319-9.
- Nelcarz, Bartolomiej & Peczkowski, Robert (2001). White Eagles: The Aircraft, Men and Operations of the Polish Air Force 1918–1939. Ottringham, UK: Hikoki Publications. ISBN 1-902109-73-2.
- Taylor, Michael J. H. (1989). Jane's Encyclopedia of Aviation. London: Studio Editions. p. 470.
- World Aircraft Information Files. London: Bright Star Publishing. pp. File 896 Sheet 11.
