= Hanriot HD.7 =

HD.7

General information
- Type: Fighter
- National origin: France
- Manufacturer: Hanriot
- Number built: 1

History
- First flight: summer 1918
- Developed from: Hanriot HD.3

The Hanriot HD.7 was a French fighter prototype of the 1910s.

== Development ==
The HD.7 was based largely on the Hanriot HD.3, using the wings and tail surfaces from the earlier model. A single-seat fighter, it first flew in 1918

== Operational history ==
The aircraft was designed to replace the SPAD S.XIII fighter. However, after its first flight in 1918, it was found to be of good performance, but inferior to its main competitor, the Nieuport-Delage NiD 29, which then entered service production for the Aéronautique Militaire in 1918. No further production occurred.

== Specifications ==
General characteristics

- Crew: 1
- Length: 7.20 m (23 ft 7.5 in)
- Wingspan: 9.80 m (32 ft 1.63 in)
- Height: 3.00 m (9 ft 10 in)
- Wing area: 28.00 m^{2} (301.39 sq ft)
- Empty weight: 1,230 kg (2,712 lb)
- Gross weight: 1,900 kg (4,189 lb)
- Powerplant: 1 × Hispano-Suiza 8Fb water-cooled engine , 224 kW (300 hp)

Performance

- Maximum speed: 218 km/h (135 mph, 117 kn)
- Range: 900 km (559 mi, 486 nmi)

Armament

- 2 x synchronised .303 Vickers gun
