= Lachassagne AL 5 =

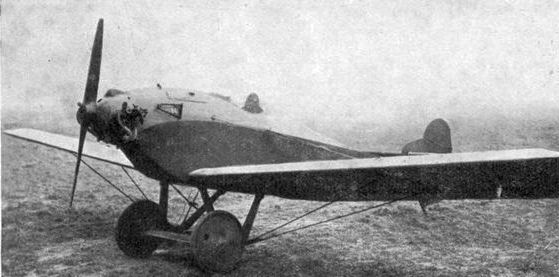

General information
- Type: Single seat sports aircraft
- National origin: France
- Designer: Adolphe Lachassagne
- Number built: at least 2

History
- First flight: 25 May 1930
- Developed from: Lachassagne AL 3
- Developed into: Lachassagne AL 6

The Lachassagne AL 5 was a French low power, single seat sports aircraft with novel, in-flight variable camber wings and tailplane. It first flew in 1930; at least two were built.

== Design and development ==
The Lachassagne AL 3 was the first French monoplane to have wings with in-flight adjustable camber. The idea was to provide a high camber, high lift airfoil at low speed and a lower camber, lower drag section at high speeds, increasing the speed range of the aircraft. The AL 3 first flew late in 1926 and only survived a short period of testing before its old and fragile undercarriage collapsed whilst landing, badly damaging it. Nonetheless, enough had been learned to encourage Lachassagne to build a new, improved version incorporating, amongst other things, a stronger undercarriage and a more modern engine.

Apart from its ability to alter its camber, each low-mounted wing of the AL5 was externally unremarkable, with a rectangular plan out to broadly rounded tips. There were two spars, rigidly and conventionally joined together. The plywood covered leading and trailing edges were each rigid structures but they were hinged on duralumin tubes which ran through the lower parts of the forward and rear spars respectively. Their angular positions were controlled together via rod and lever linkages and determined the profile of the surfaces between the spars. As the edges were rotated downwards, the underside surface bent upwards; spacers kept the local thickness constant so the upper surface curvature also increased, as did the overall camber. As a result, the upper side surface path between the spars increased, so extra skin was allowed to slide out from under the upper side of the trailing edge. There were three wing settings, one for take-off, one for speed and a third for landing. Lachassagne estimated that the camber-changing features added about 15% to the weight of the wing. Broad chord ailerons occupied about 40% of the span. Each wing was wire braced with two pairs of long Vs from the spars at about mid-span, one to the upper fuselage and the other to the landing gear.

The AL 5's fuselage was built around four longerons, giving it a rectangular cross-section. The forward part had a high rounded decking between the nose and the pilot's open cockpit; this dropped away aft and ended about halfway to the tail. The engine was a 13 kW (18 hp) ABC Scorpion flat twin, mounted with its cylinder heads exposed for air-cooling and driving a two blade propeller. At the rear, the AL 5 had a low, rounded fin and a distinctly stepped, rounded, balanced rudder which reached down to the keel. A trapezoidal horizontal tail, braced to the fuselage, was mounted on the fin just above the fuselage; its camber was altered along with that of the wing and in a similar way, though the camber rage was greater and could be negative. It carried separate elevators which had inner cut-aways for rudder movement.

The AL 5 had a much more robust undercarriage than its predecessor. A frame with two near vertical legs to the lower fuselage longerons and two diagonal struts to the central fuselage underside supported a single axle within an airfoil section fairing, with the wheels at its extremities. A long tailskid protected the bottom of the rudder.

The Lachassagne AL 5 flew for the first time on 25 May 1930 at Orly, piloted by Marcel Haegelen. Test flights continued up to August, when a two-month break was taken to improve both the engine and the camber controls. Modifications included making the camber-setting for take-off semi-automatic. The test programme resumed around the middle of October. A second AL 5, built to order, had its first flight on 11 September 1935 Its revised undercarriage had extra diagonal cross-bracing struts.

In 1936 Lachassagne introduced the AL 6. This was a close relative of the AL 5 but powered by a 13 kW (17 hp) Aubier-Dunne air-cooled, twin cylinder, inverted inline two-stroke engine. It was externally similar to the AL 5, though its dimensions and weights are not known, but it had a new undercarriage with split axles hinged on a transverse V-strut from the fuselage longerons.

== Operational history ==
In May 1932 the AL 5 attended a rally at Orly, along with many light aircraft. In June 1934, Bourré, a young and inexperienced pilot, brought the AL 5 to Vincennes to demonstrate it but was caught in turbulence as he landed and suffered multiple injuries. The second AL 5 was developed and tested at Enghien-les-Bains, then shipped to Cameroon, where it was flown for some time by Berberoux.

Starting on 8 September 1936, the AL 6 flew from Orly with a diverse collection of current French prototypes on a ten-day Tour of France.

== Specifications (AL 5) ==
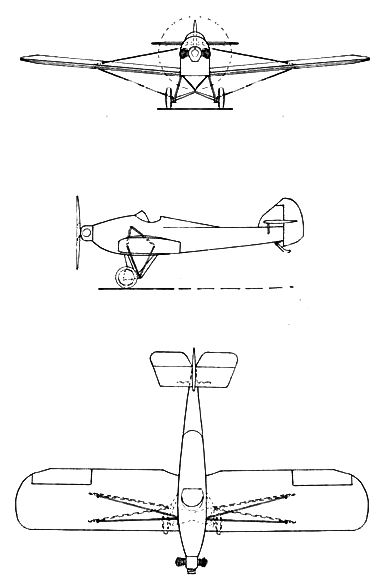
Lachassagne AL 5 3-view drawing from L'Aerophile May 1935

Data from l'Aérophile May 1935

General characteristics

- Length: 4.57 m (15 ft 0 in)
- Wingspan: 7.15 m (23 ft 5 in)
- Wing area: 8 m^{2} (86 sq ft)
- Aspect ratio: 6.4
- Empty weight: 130 kg (287 lb)
- Gross weight: 230 kg (507 lb)
- Powerplant: 1 × ABC Scorpion flat twin, 1.1 L (67 cu in), 13 kW (18 hp)
- Propellers: 2-bladed

Performance

- Maximum speed: 130 km/h (81 mph, 70 kn)
- Cruise speed: 120 km/h (75 mph, 65 kn)
- Service ceiling: 4,000 m (13,000 ft)
- Rate of climb: 2.3 m/s (450 ft/min)
- Take-off speed: 35 km/h (22 mph)
