= H38 =

H38 may refer to:

- Hanriot H.38, a French flying boat
- HMS Delight (H38), a Royal Navy D-class destroyer
- Hoffmann H38 Observer, an experimental aircraft
