= 5th Fighter Group "Kos" =

- Active: May – June 1940
- Allegiance: Polish government-in-exile
- Branch: Polish Air Forces in France
- Role: Fighter defense
- Size: 7 pilots, 13 ground crew
- Nickname: Kos
- Engagements: Second World War: Battle of France

Commanders
- Notable commanders: Bronisław Kosiński

5th Fighter Group "Kos" (Polish: V Klucz Kominowy „Kos”) was an air unit of the Polish Air Forces in France, formed in May 1940, as part of Fighter Squadron 1/55 of the French Air Force. It was commanded by capitan Bronisław Kosiński. The unit served in the Battle of France during the Second World War, being stationed in Bourges. It was disbanded in late June 1940, shortly before the capitulation of France.

== History ==
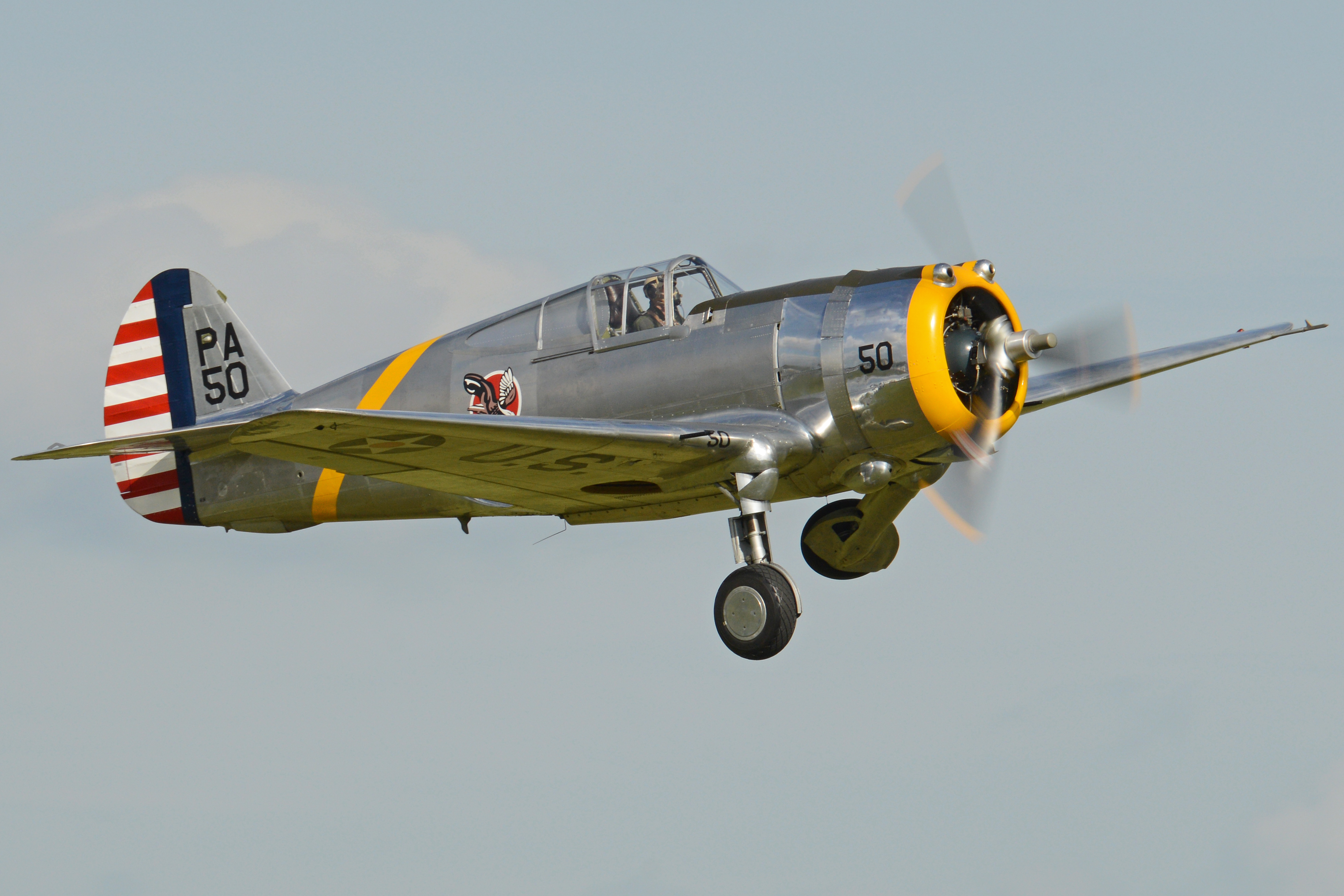
The Curtiss P-36 Hawk fighter aircraft, a model equipped by the unit.

The 5th Fighter Group "Kos" was formed in the second half of May 1940, during the Battle of France in the Second World War. It was under the command of Polish Air Forces in France, and was a part of the Fighter Squadron 1/55 of the French Air Force. The group was primarily formed from pilots who came from Poland, and recently graduated from the fighter pilot training school in Avord, France. The unit was commanded by captain Bronisław Kosiński, and among its crew were lieutenant Marian Wesołowski, platoon-leader Jan Kremski, corporal Adolf Pietrasiak, corporal Wacław Giermer, sergeant Wilhelm Kosarz. It also included lieutenant colonel Marcel Haegelen originating from France. The unit was equipped with the Curtiss P-36 Hawk fighter aircraft, and was stationed in Bourges, France, with mission to defend the nearby Hanriot aircraft factory. It took part in its first mission on 24 May 1940, during which, it shot down one German aircraft, and damaged two more. Until 17 June 1940, the unit performed around thirty missions, achieving three and 2/5 of recorded air victories, and three and 3/5 of recorded damage to enemy aircraft. It did not suffer any casualties throughout its existence. In the late June 1940, with the imminent capitulation of France, the soldiers of the unit evacuated to Algeria, from where they were transported via a ship to the United Kingdom, joining its Royal Air Force.
