= Hanriot HD.6 =

French fighter aircraft prototype

HD.6

General information
- Type: Two seat fighter aircraft
- National origin: France
- Manufacturer: Aeroplanes Hanriot et Cie
- Designer: Emile Dupont
- Number built: 1

History
- First flight: spring 1919

The Hanriot HD.6 was a French two-seat fighter aircraft prototype, built towards the end of World War I though not flown until after the armistice with Germany. A biplane with an unusually narrow gap between upper and lower wings, powered by a single water-cooled radial engine, it did not enter production.

== Design and development ==
The Hanriot HD.6 was rather like a scaled-up (by nearly 30% in span), more powerful version of the HD.5. Both were two-seat fighters and biplanes with equal span upper and lower wings. The unstaggered wings were divided into two bays on each side by two pairs of parallel interplane struts; bracing was assisted by wires. Their wings were almost rectangular in plan, with squared wing tips on the HD.6 though the rounded tips of its short span, horn balanced ailerons, mounted on both upper and lower planes, projected beyond. On both designs the interplane gap was unusually small, with the upper wing so close to the fuselage that its leading edge required a deep, slot like cut-out for the pilot's head. Behind him the trailing edge also had a cut-out, this for the movement of the rear gunner's two dorsal Lewis guns; he also had a single, ventrally mounted Lewis gun. From gunner to tail, the fuselage of the HD.5 had rounded decking. The fighter's braced, rectangular tailplane, mounted on top of the fuselage had projecting horn balances on its elevators like those on the ailerons. The fin was small but the rudder was broad chord and low; it was very rounded and extended down to the keel, so there was an elevator cut-out for rudder movement.

The HD.6 was powered by a 530 hp (395 kW) Salmson 18Z two row, 18-cylinder radial engine, water-cooled by three circular section radiators mounted between the legs of its fixed conventional undercarriage. This had mainwheels on a single axle attached by V-struts to the lower fuselage, assisted by a tailskid.

Built at about the same time as the HD.5, the first flight of the sole prototype was delayed by over a year owing to development difficulties with the novel engine. Beginning in the spring of 1919, flight testing lasted into the late summer, when further development was abandoned.

== Specifications ==
Data from Green & Swanborough p.277

General characteristics

- Crew: Two
- Length: 8.85 m (29 ft 0 in)
- Wingspan: 13.60 m (44 ft 7 in)
- Height: 2.90 m (9 ft 6 in)
- Wing area: 47.50 m^{2} (511.3 sq ft)
- Empty weight: 810 kg (1,786 lb)
- Gross weight: 1,250 kg (2,756 lb)
- Powerplant: 1 × Salmson 18Z water-cooled two row 18 cylinder radial, 400 kW (530 hp)
- Propellers: 2-bladed

Performance

- Maximum speed: 225 km/h (140 mph, 121 kn)
- Range: 600 km (370 mi, 320 nmi)
- Endurance: 3 h
- Service ceiling: 7,000 m (23,000 ft)
- Time to altitude:
  - 2 min 47 s to 1,000 m (3,280 ft)
  - 19 min 20 s to 5,000 m (16,400 ft)

Armament

- Guns: 2 × fixed, pilot operated synchronised 0.303 in (7.7 mm) Vickers machine guns; 2 × Lewis guns on mount in rear cockpit firing above fuselage and a third mounted ventrally.
