= H36 =

H36 may refer to:

- Hanriot H.36, a French trainer aircraft
- Hoffmann H36, an Austrian motor glider
- HMS Antelope (H36), a Royal Navy A-class destroyer
