= H34 =

H34 may refer to:

- Hanriot H.34, a French trainer aircraft
- HMS H34, a British H-class submarine
- Huntsville Municipal Airport (Arkansas)
- Sikorsky H-34, an American helicopter
