= Hanriot HD.8 =

HD.8

General information
- Type: Fighter
- National origin: France
- Manufacturer: Hanriot
- Number built: 1

History
- First flight: March or April 1918

The Hanriot HD.8 was a short-lived French fighter prototype of the 1910s.

== Development ==
A single-seat fighter, it was largely designed to test the experimental Le Rhône 9R engine. It first flew in early 1918, however was plagued by problems from the start, mainly due to its powerplant. As a result, it was never submitted for official testing. The data below are based on Hanriot estimates.

== Specifications ==
General characteristics

- Crew: 1
- Length: 6.15 m (20 ft 2 in)
- Wingspan: 9.60 m (31 ft 6 in)
- Wing area: 25.00 m^{2} (269.1 sq ft)
- Empty weight: 480 kg (1,058 lb)
- Gross weight: 690 kg (1,521 lb)
- Powerplant: 1 × Le Rhône 9R nine-cylinder air-cooled rotary engine , 134 kW (180 hp)

Performance

- Maximum speed: 200 km/h (124 mph, 108 kn)
- Endurance: 2 hours 0 minutes
