= Escadrille Spa.100 =

- Active: 1918
- Country: France
- Branch: French Air Service
- Type: Fighter Squadron

Escadrille Spa.100 (originally Escadrille N.100) was a French fighter squadron active during the last 11 months of World War I. Flying combat as a component of larger fighter formations, Escadrille Spa.100 was credited with destroying 11 German airplanes and 12 observation balloons between 16 January and 11 November 1918.

== History ==
Escadrille Spa.100 was based on a draft of men from Escadrille N.89. Formed on 16 January 1918, it was originally called Escadrille N.100 because it was outfitted with Nieuport 24, Nieuport 24bis, and Nieuport 27 aircraft. The new squadron was posted to VII Armee for duty. In early February, the escadrille was one of four incorporated into a new fighter grouping, Groupe de Combat 17. In early March, the squadron refitted with new SPAD S.7 and SPAD S.13 fighters. On 8 March, it was transferred to VI Armee; a week later, it was renamed Escadrille Spa.100. By the 11 November 1918 ceasefire, Escadrille Spa.100 was credited with the destruction of 11 German airplanes and 12 observation balloons.

== Commanding officers ==
- Lieutenant Charles Boudox d'Hautefeuille: 16 January 1918 - missing in action 20 April 1918
- Lieutenant de Vaubicourt: 20 April 1918 - war's end

== Notable member ==
- Sous lieutenant Marcel Haegelen

== Aircraft ==
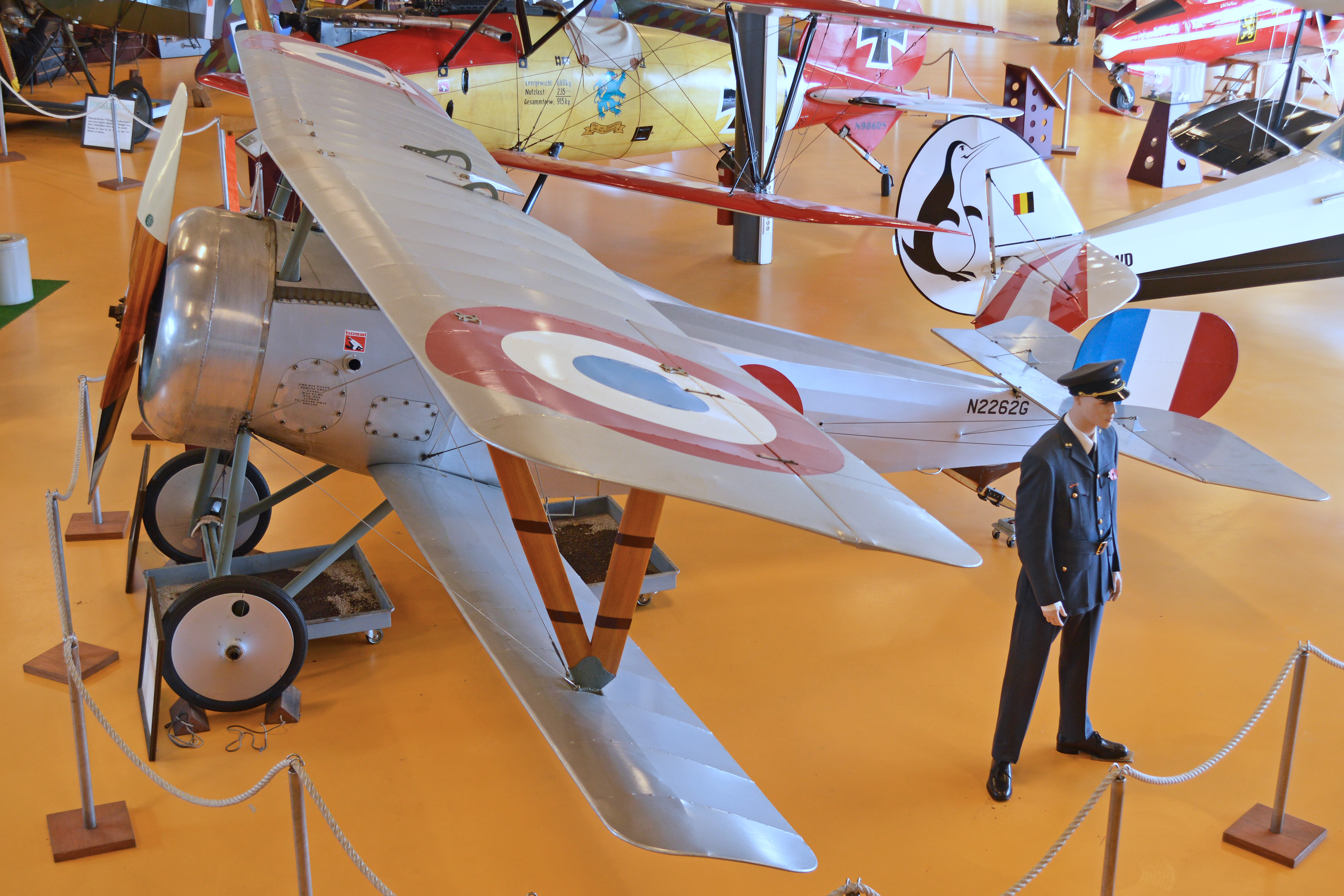
Replica Nieuport 24bis on display at the Antwerp Airport museum.

- Nieuport 24: 16 January 1918 - early March 1918
- Nieuport 24bis: 16 January 1918 - early March 1918
- Nieuport 27: 16 January 1918 - early March 1918
- SPAD S.7: Early March 1918 - war's end.
- SPAD S.13: Early March 1918 - war's end.
