= Hanriot H.110 =

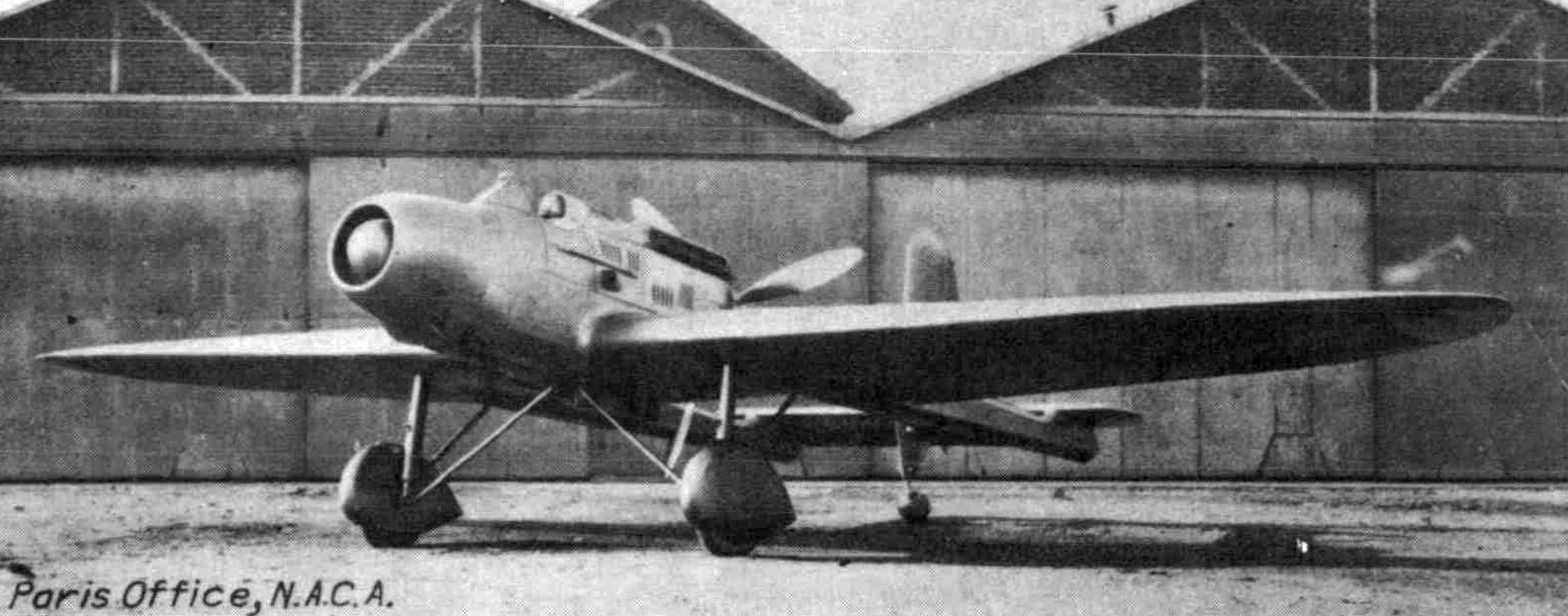
- H.110

General information
- Type: Single seat fighter aircraft
- National origin: France
- Manufacturer: Avions Hanriot
- Number built: 1

History
- First flight: April 1933

The Hanriot H.110 was an unusual pusher configuration, twin boom, single seat fighter aircraft built in France in the early 1930s. It proved to be slower and less manoeuvrable than its contemporaries and failed to reach production, even as the Hanriot H.115 after receiving a more powerful engine and cannon armament.

== Design and development ==
From 1916 until 1933, the only Hanriot fighter aircraft had been tractor biplanes. The Hanriot H.110, a twin boom pusher cantilever monoplane was therefore a considerable departure from the past. It was designed to compete in the STAé (Service Technique de l'Aéronautique or Technical Section of Aeronautics) 1930/31 C1 (single seat Chasseur of fighter) programme.

The all-metal H.110 had an open cockpit and engine in a short central nacelle. It was powered by a 485 kW (650 hp) Hispano-Suiza 12Xbrs supercharged upright water-cooled V-12 engine behind the pilot, driving a three-blade pusher propeller. The pilot's headrest was smoothly faired into the engine cowling. There was a circular Chausson radiator in the short nose ahead of the open cockpit, with a variable position central cone to control the airflow.

The wings were built around two spars. The central 25% of their span, between the booms, had constant chord. Immediately outboard they had a wider chord and beyond were double straight tapered to rounded tips. They carried almost full-span, narrow-chord Frise ailerons. Forward, the slim, square section and untapered tail booms blended into the wings at about mid-chord, the aft ends carrying a constant-chord tailplane slightly above them. This had rounded tips and a central elevator with a trim tab. A central, single, tall, round-tipped, wire-braced vertical tail was mounted on in it. The H.110 had a fixed, split, conventional undercarriage with each spatted mainwheel on a faired, near vertical shock absorber and a rearward leaning strut together forming a V, laterally braced with an inverted V-strut attached near the under-fuselage centre line. There was a central tailwheel on a long leg under the fin.

The H.110 began flight testing in April 1933. Tested against its smaller and lighter competitors, it proved slower and less manoeuvrable and was returned to Hanriot for modification. It flew in April 1934 as the H.115, with its HS 12Xbrs engine uprated to 515 kW (691 hp), a new four-blade propeller with variable-pitch and a revised nacelle, shortened forward of the cockpit by 360 mm (14.2 in). A 33 mm (1.30 in) APX cannon was now housed in a fairing below the nacelle as an alternative to the earlier pair of Chatellerault 7.5 mm (0.295 in) machine guns. With its new engine and propeller the H.115 was quicker than the earlier version, with a top speed of 390 km/h (242 mph). After more modifications over the winter of 1934-5 it returned to Villacoublay in June 1935 and was officially flight tested until mid August, but failed to attract a contract.

== Variants ==
H.110
Original version.
H.115
Uprated engine, shorter nose, four blade propeller and a 33mm A.P.X. cannon.

== Specifications (H.110) ==
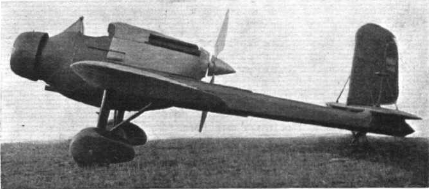
H.115, showing the ventral cannon

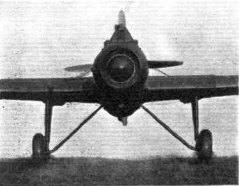
H.115, showing the nose radiator

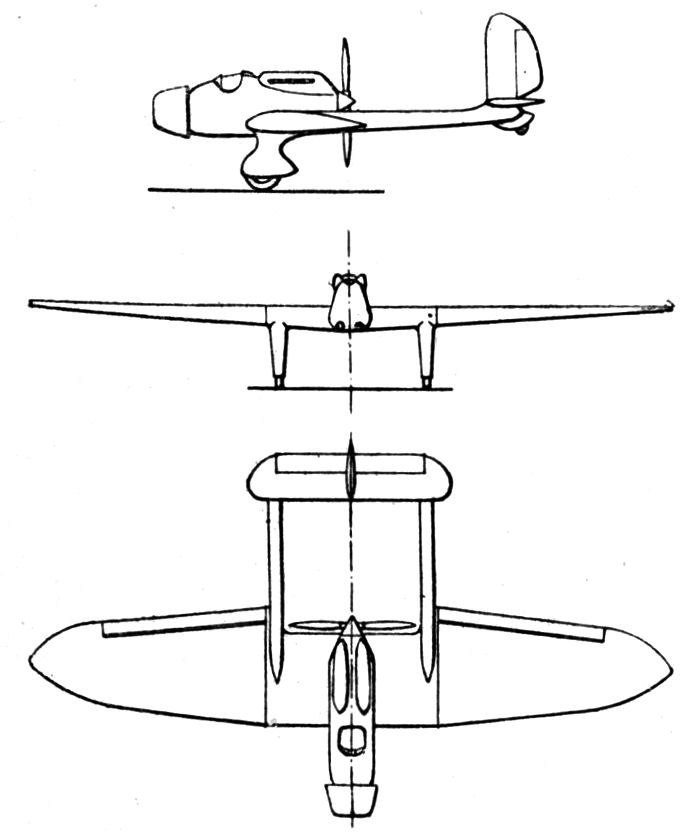
Hanriot 110 3 view from l'Aerophile magazine January 1933

Data from Green & Swanborough p.279-80

General characteristics

- Crew: One
- Length: 7.96 m (26 ft 1 in)
- Wingspan: 13.50 m (44 ft 3 in)
- Height: 2.70 m (8 ft 10 in)
- Wing area: 24.00 m^{2} (258.3 sq ft)
- Empty weight: 1,260 kg (2,778 lb)
- Gross weight: 1,750 kg (3,858 lb)
- Powerplant: 1 × Hispano-Suiza 12Xbrs supercharged upright watercooled V-12 engine, 480 kW (650 hp) at 4,000 m (13,120 ft)
- Propellers: 3-bladed pusher configuration
- Rated power (50 hr continuous, under load) 370 kW (500 hp)

Performance

- Maximum speed: 355 km/h (221 mph, 192 kn)
- Range: 600 km (370 mi, 320 nmi)
- Time to altitude: 7.78 min to 5,000 m (16,405 ft)

Armament

- Guns: 2×7.5 mm (0.293 in) MAC 1934 machine guns
