= Farman F.1010 =

F.1010

General information
- Type: Experimental cannon carrier
- National origin: France
- Manufacturer: Farman, Boulogne-Billancourt
- Number built: 1

History
- First flight: August 1932

The Farman F.1010 was a small, low-wing, single-seat monoplane ordered by the French government in 1931 to test in flight a large-calibre cannon. This was mounted between the cylinder banks of an inverted V-8 engine.

== Design and development ==
A distant relative of the Farman F.230 series of two-seat touring and postal aircraft, the F.1010 was funded by a 1931 government contract for an aircraft to flight test the combination of a large calibre (33 mm) but slow firing (2 rounds per second) cannon, manufactured by Atelier des Puteaux (APX), and Farman's own 350 hp (kW) water-cooled engine. The latter was a 90° inverted V-8, allowing the gun to be mounted between the cylinders more easily, firing through the propeller blades.

The F.1010 was a low-wing monoplane, with straight edged, square tipped wings typical of the 230 series though of greater span. Initially, it also had similar straight edged tail surfaces, with a low fin carrying a rudder that moved between the elevators, mounted on the fuselage top and reaching down to the keel. It had the deep, flat-sided and round-decked fuselage characteristic of the series, with a single, open cockpit above the trailing edge. The F.1010 had a fixed, conventional undercarriage, with single wheels on faired, outward splayed V struts and a tailskid.

The V-8 engine was much larger than any of the motors used by 230 series machines, requiring a distinctive deep, round-chinned cowling. Unusually, its radiators were initially placed edge-on down the fuselage sides above the wings, starting about mid-chord and ending just ahead of the cockpit.

The F.1010 was first flown by Lucien Coupet in August 1932, then by other Farman test-pilots Burtin and André Salel. It was tested by a military test pilot, lieutenant Francois Polart in tests beginning that December at Villacoublay. He found it heavy (the cannon accounted for 10% of the total loaded weight) and unmanoeuvrable. Significant modifications were made during these test, which extended into 1933. Manoeuvrability was addressed by the addition of a second horizontal tail surface at the top of the fin, braced to the original one below with wide chord struts. The lateral radiators were moved to the wings. The original two-bladed propeller was replaced by a four bladed, metal one. Polart also reported strong vibrations at low speeds and a tendency to drop the nose when the engine was at full power. The F.1010 was taken to Cazaux for gun testing; the aircraft probably returned to be abandoned at Villacoublay at the end of these firing tests.

== Specifications ==
Data from Les avions Farman

General characteristics

- Crew: 1
- Length: 8.24 m (27 ft 0 in)
- Wingspan: 11.50 m (37 ft 9 in)
- Height: 2.60 m (8 ft 6 in)
- Wing area: 26.25 m^{2} (282.6 sq ft)
- Gross weight: 1,900 kg (4,189 lb)
- Powerplant: 1 × Farman 8 VI 8-cylinder 90° inverted V, watercooled, 260 kW (350 hp)
- Propellers: 2-bladed wooden for first flights, later replaced by a 4-bladed metal propeller

Performance

- Maximum speed: 320 km/h (200 mph, 170 kn)

Armament

- Guns: 1x 33mm A.P.X. cannon mounted between piston banks, firing through propeller at 120 rounds per minute

== Bibliography ==
- Liron, Jean (1984). Les avions Farman. Collection Docavia. Vol. 21. Paris: Éditions Larivière. OCLC 37146471.
