= Lorraine-Hanriot LH.60 =

1930s French aircraft

LH.60

General information
- Type: Military trainer aircraft
- National origin: France
- Manufacturer: Hanriot
- Number built: 1

History
- First flight: 1931

The Lorraine-Hanriot LH.60 was a training monoplane built in France in the early 1930s.

== Design ==
It was a conventional parasol-wing monoplane with fixed tailskid undercarriage, the main units of which were mounted on outriggers attached to the wing struts. The pilot and instructor sat in tandem open cockpits. The LH.60 was of wood and metal construction.

== Variants ==
LH.60
Parasol monoplane crew / observer trainer
LH.61
Parasol monoplane fighter trainer

== Specifications (LH.60) ==
Data from Aviafrance : Lorraine-Hanriot LH.60

General characteristics

- Crew: 2
- Length: 7.85 m (25 ft 9 in)
- Wingspan: 13.7 m (44 ft 11 in)
- Height: 3.43 m (11 ft 3 in)
- Wing area: 24 m^{2} (260 sq ft)
- Gross weight: 1,328 kg (2,928 lb)
- Powerplant: 1 × Lorraine 7Me Mizar 7-cylinder air-cooled radial piston engine, 180 kW (240 hp)
- Propellers: 2-bladed fixed pitch propeller

Performance
