= Lorraine Hanriot LH.41 =

1930s French racing aircraft

LH.41
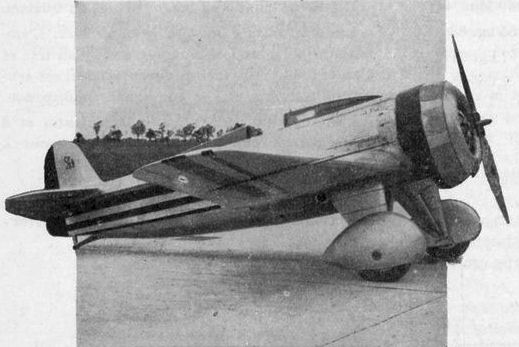

General information
- Type: Racer / aerobatic / fighter-trainer
- National origin: France
- Manufacturer: Lorraine Hanriot
- Number built: 3

History
- First flight: May 1930

The Lorraine Hanriot LH.41 was a single-seat racing aircraft designed and built in France specifically to compete in the Coupe Michelin air races, held in France.

== Design and development ==
The LH.41 was a small low-wing, cantilever monoplane built largely of wood with fabric and plywood skinning. The LH.41 was supported on a wide-track strut mounted undercarriage, incorporating oleo-pneumatic shock-absorbers, with a tail-skid.

For initial flight testing the LH.41 was fitted with a 180 kW (240 hp) Lorraine 7Mb Mizar 7-cylinder radial engine with a distinctive oil cooler on the port side of the fuselage forward of the cockpit. After initial testing the LH.41, re-engined with the intended 170 kW (230 hp) Lorraine 9Nb driving a Levasseur metal fixed pitch propeller fitted with a dorsal oil cooler in place of the side-mounted cooler. The 9Nb was fitted with a short chord Townend ring by the time the race began.

=== LH.41.02 ===
Lorraine-Hanriot recovered the engine from the wreckage of the LH.41, tested it to ensure it was serviceable and fitted it to a new airframe, dubbed LH.41.02 (aka LH.41/2, or LH.41-2). The airframe was refined to give less drag, removing exterior bracing cables on the tail-unit and fully enclosing the engine in a NACA cowling.

=== LH.42 ===
Another airframe was built, essentially identical to the LH.41.02, but with further improvements, including faired-in undercarriage legs.

== Operational history ==
The LH.41 first flew in May 1930 and was duly entered in the 1929/1930 Coupe Michelin, flown by Marcel Haegelen. The LH.41 was beating the competition until an accident upon landing at Reims destroyed the aircraft and seriously injured Haegelen, after landing in tall grass.

After the unfortunate demise of the LH.41.01 at Reims, Lorraine-Hanriot entered the LH.41.02 in the 1930/1931 Coupe Michelin air race, which Haegelen won at an average speed of 255.6 km/h (138.0 kn; 158.8 mph), flying 2,632 km (1,421 nmi; 1,635 mi) in 11 hours 37 minutes 21 seconds, including refuelling, take-offs and landings.

The LH.42 was flown by Haegelen in the 1931/1932 Coupe Michelin air race on 12 August 1932, achieving victory again, at an average speed of 254.36 km/h (137.34 kn; 158.05 mph), flying 2,632 km (1,421 nmi; 1,635 mi) in 10 hours 20 minutes 21 seconds, including refuelling take-offs and landings.

After the 1931/1932 Coupe Michelin victory, Haegelen proposed a world record speed attempt for a 500 km (310 mi) closed -circuit. Taking off on 31 August 1932 Haegelen completed the course but was unable to land at Étampes, on his return, due to bad weather. Diverting to Tours was fruitless, as the area was shrouded in fog. After circuiting Tour hoping for the fog to lift, Haegelen was forced to bail-out when the fuel was exhausted. The LH.42 continued on alone until it crashed near the Château du Loire.

== Variants ==
LH.41.01
A racing aircraft, primarily intended to compete in the Coupe Michelin. The sole example was destroyed in an accident during the 1929/1930 Coupe Michelin race.
LH.41.02
A second machine built fitted with the Lorraine 9Nb recovered from the wreckage of the LH.41.01 driving a Ratier metal airscrew. Flown by Haegelen to victory in the 1930/1931 Coupe Michelin air race.
LH.42
The LH.41.02 developed with an all-metal fuselage, increased fuel capacity, more refined aerodynamic features and fully cowled Lorraine 9Nb engine up-rated to 180 kW (240 hp) driving a Levasseur-Ratier metal airscrew. The LH.42 crashed during a world record attempt due to bad weather.

== Specifications (LH.41) ==
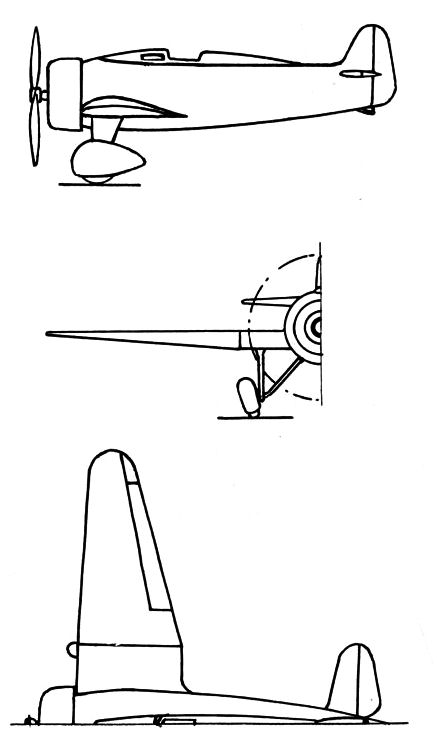
Lorraine Hanriot LH.41 3-view drawing from L'Aerophile Salon 1932

Data from Aviafrance LH.41

General characteristics

- Crew: 1
- Length: 6.87 m (22 ft 6 in)
- Wingspan: 10.2 m (33 ft 6 in)
- Wing area: 14 m^{2} (150 sq ft)
- Empty weight: 950 kg (2,094 lb)
- Gross weight: 1,150 kg (2,535 lb)
- Fuel capacity: 350 L (92 US gal; 77 imp gal)
- Powerplant: 1 × Lorraine 9Nb 9-cylinder air-cooled radial piston engine, 170 kW (230 hp)
- Propellers: 2-bladed Levasseur metal fixed pitch propeller

Performance

- Maximum speed: 260 km/h (160 mph, 140 kn)
- Wing loading: 85 kg/m^{2} (17 lb/sq ft)
- Power/mass: 0.143 kW/kg (0.0872 hp/lb)

== Bibliography ==
- Cortet, Pierre (August 2001). "Marcel Haegelen et les Lorraine-Hanriot 41/42/130/131" [Marcel Haegelen and the Lorraine-Hanriot 41/42/130/131]. Avions: Toute l'Aéronautique et son histoire (in French) (101): 39–47. ISSN 1243-8650.
