= Hanriot H.38 =

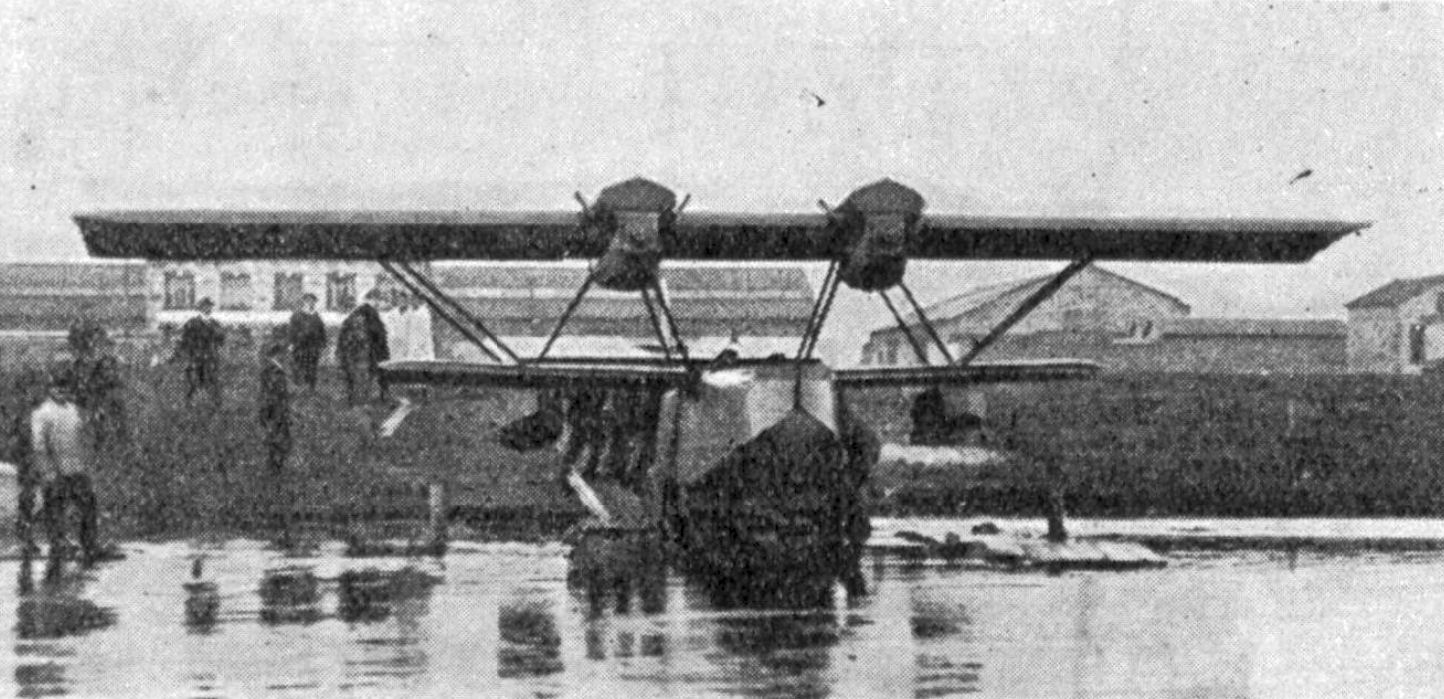

General information
- Type: Military utility flying boat
- National origin: France
- Manufacturer: Avions Hanriot
- Number built: 1

History
- First flight: early 1926

The Hanriot H.38 was a French twin-engined sesquiplane flying boat built in the mid-1920s. Though the sole prototype was fitted with two defensive machine gun posts. the H.38 was described at the time as a utility aircraft.

== Design and development ==
The upper wing of the H.38 was mounted high above the water, with the smaller lower wing attached to the upper hull. Both wings had low aspect ratio and were essentially rectangular in plan, with constant thickness. Each was built around two steel spars and they were braced together with pairs of parallel steel interplane struts. There were three sets of these on each side, one pair outwards from the lower wing, another from the same points inwards to the engine mountings on the upper wing and another between the engines and the lower wing root.

The H.38 was powered by two 130 kW (180 hp) Hispano-Suiza 8Ab water-cooled V8 engines with front-mounted radiators, placed as close together as their propellers diameters allowed in order to minimise asymmetric thrust in the event of an engine failure.

Its hull was wooden, with a concave section, single step bottom, gently curved sides and a flat top. The underside was triple surfaced and the sides double. Stability on the water was provided by a pair of floats under the lower wings beneath the interplane strut mountings, separated by about 4.7 m (15 ft 5 in). The hull contained three open crew positions. Two of them, one in the extreme nose and the other midway between the trailing edge and the tail, housed machine gunners. The cockpit, which was under the leading edge of the upper wing, had two side-by-side seats, equipped with dual controls.

The hull underside sloped upward aft to the tail, where a low fin served also as a step on which to mount a rectangular tailplane braced on each side with struts to the lower side of the hull. It carried angle-tipped, balanced elevators. The roughly rhomboidal, generous rudder was also balanced.

The exact date of the first flight of the Hanriot H.38 is not known but it had flown many times before mid-March 1926. It continued to fly for another ten months until, after alighting on the Marne at Bezons, it was caught by the current, capsized and lost after hitting the pier of a bridge. Neither Marcel Haegelen, Hanriot's chief test pilot, nor the flight engineer Quéro were seriously injured.

== Specifications ==
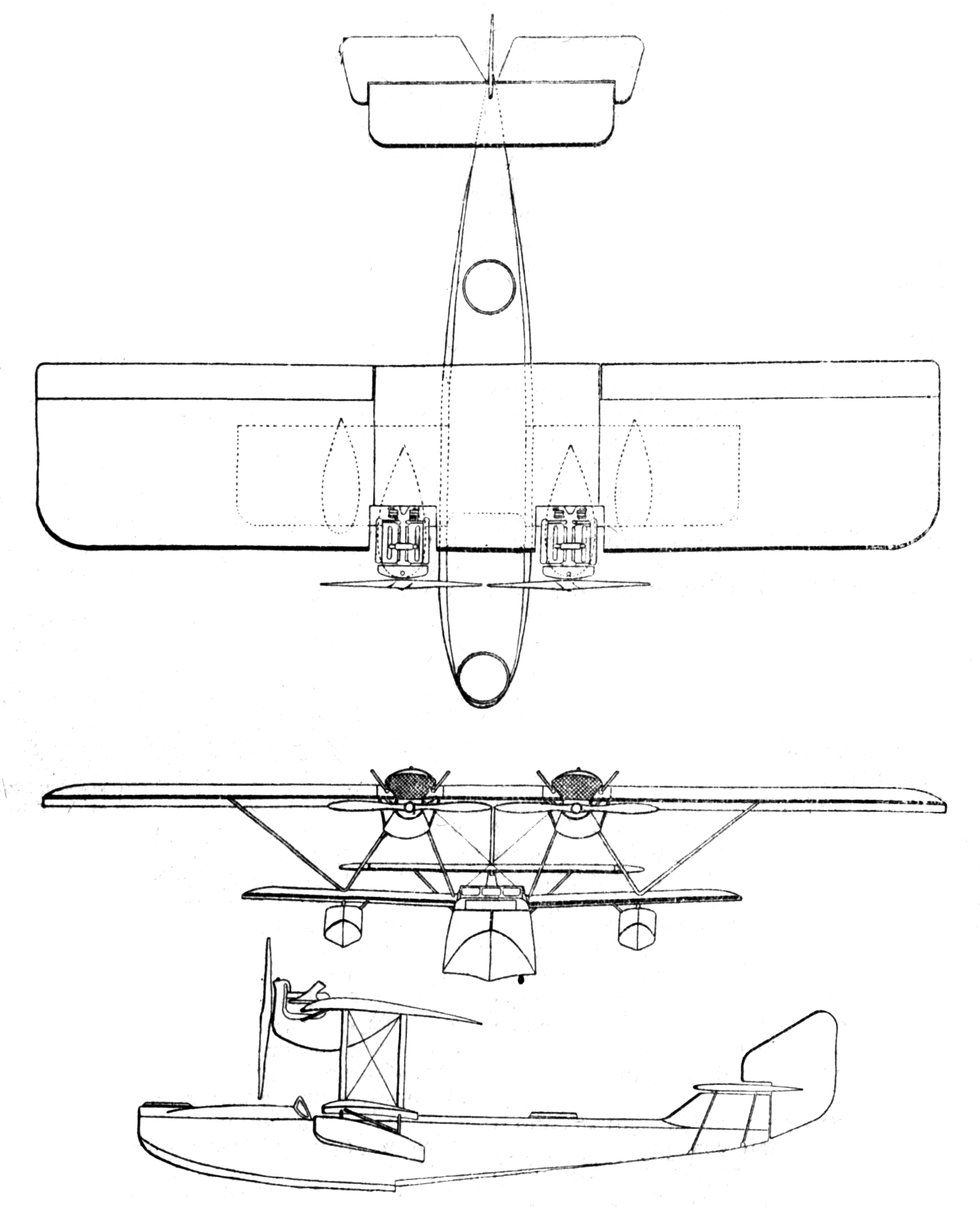
Hanriot H.38 3-view drawing from Les Ailes March 18, 1926

Data from Les Ailes, March 1926

General characteristics

- Crew: Three/four
- Length: 10.75 m (35 ft 3 in)
- Upper wingspan: 14 m (45 ft 11 in)
- Lower wingspan: 7.75 m (25 ft 5 in)
- Height: 3.50 m (11 ft 6 in)
- Wing area: 50 m^{2} (540 sq ft)
- Empty weight: 1,555 kg (3,428 lb)
- Gross weight: 2,377 kg (5,240 lb)
- Fuel capacity: 322 kg (710 lb) fuel + oil
- Powerplant: 2 × Hispano-Suiza 8Ab water-cooled V8, 130 kW (180 hp) each
- Propellers: 2-bladed

Performance

- Maximum speed: 160 km/h (99 mph, 86 kn) at ground level
- Service ceiling: 4,600 m (15,100 ft)
