= Hanriot 1909 monoplane =

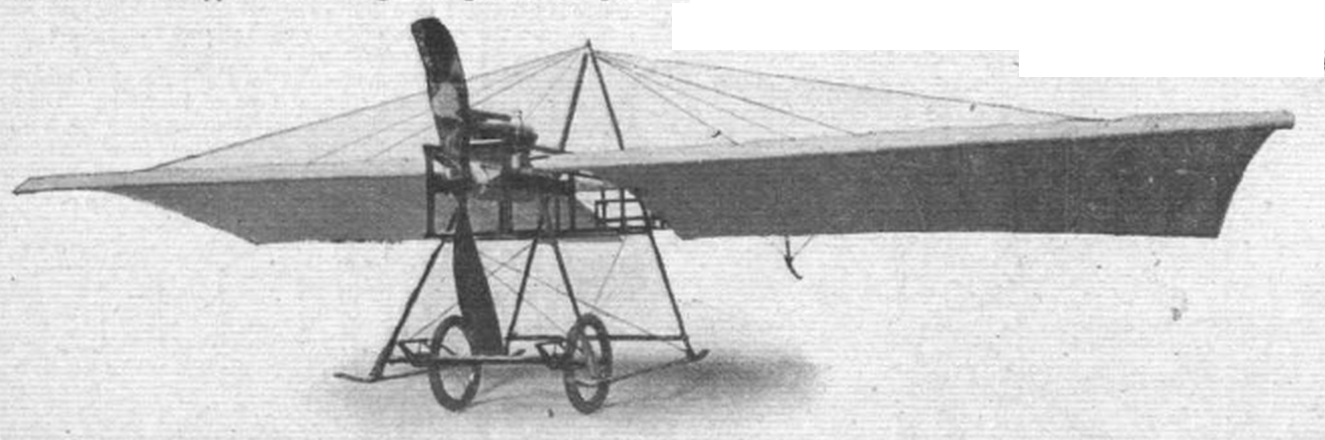
- At the 1909 Paris Salon

General information
- Type: sports aircraft
- National origin: France
- Manufacturer: Hanriot
- Number built: 2

History
- First flight: 1909

The Hanriot 1909 monoplane was an early French aircraft constructed by Rene Hanriot, a successful automobile racer.

== Design ==
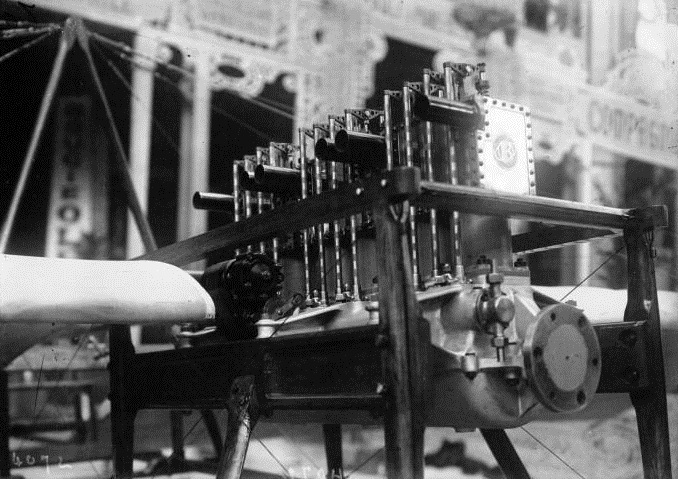
Engine installation, 50 hp Buchet

The Hanriot 1909 monoplane had an uncovered rectangular-section wire-braced wooden fuselage with deeply cambered parallel-chord wings. The main undercarriage consisted of a pair of skids which carried a pair of independently sprung wheels mounted on a steel cross tube, the skids being carried on two pairs of struts which converged inwards, the aft pair being continued above the fuselage to form an inverted V cabane to which the wing bracing and warping wires were attached. The front struts terminated at the engine bearers, which were midway between the upper and lower longerons. Tail surfaces consisted of a tailplane and elevator mounted on top of the fuselage and a fixed fin mounted under the fuselage with the attached rudder underneath the horizontal tail surfaces. The aircraft was controlled with a pair of handwheels on either side of the cockpit operating wing warping and elevator, and foot-pedals operating the rudder.

Two examples were shown at the Paris Aero Salon in October 1909 in an unfinished condition. One was powered by a (37 kW (50 hp) Buchet engine and the other by a 25 kW (35 hp) Hanriot engine. One was successfully flown at Rheims in December 1909, first by Eugene Ruchonnet and afterwards by Rene Hanriot followed by his son Marcel, then aged 15.

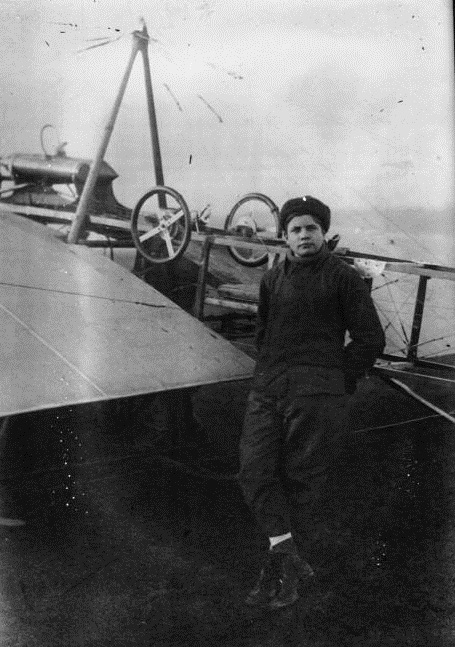
Marcel Hanriot in front of the 1909 monoplane

The two aircraft displayed at the 1909 Paris exhibition were the only examples manufactured. Flight refers to them as the Hanriot I (Hanriot engine) and Hanriot II (Buchet engine). By the time that they were first flown Hanriot and Ruchonnet had already started work on a series of closely related monoplane designs, which were exhibited at the Salon d'Automobiles, d'Aeronautique, du Cycles et des Sports, which opened in Brussels on 16 January 1910.

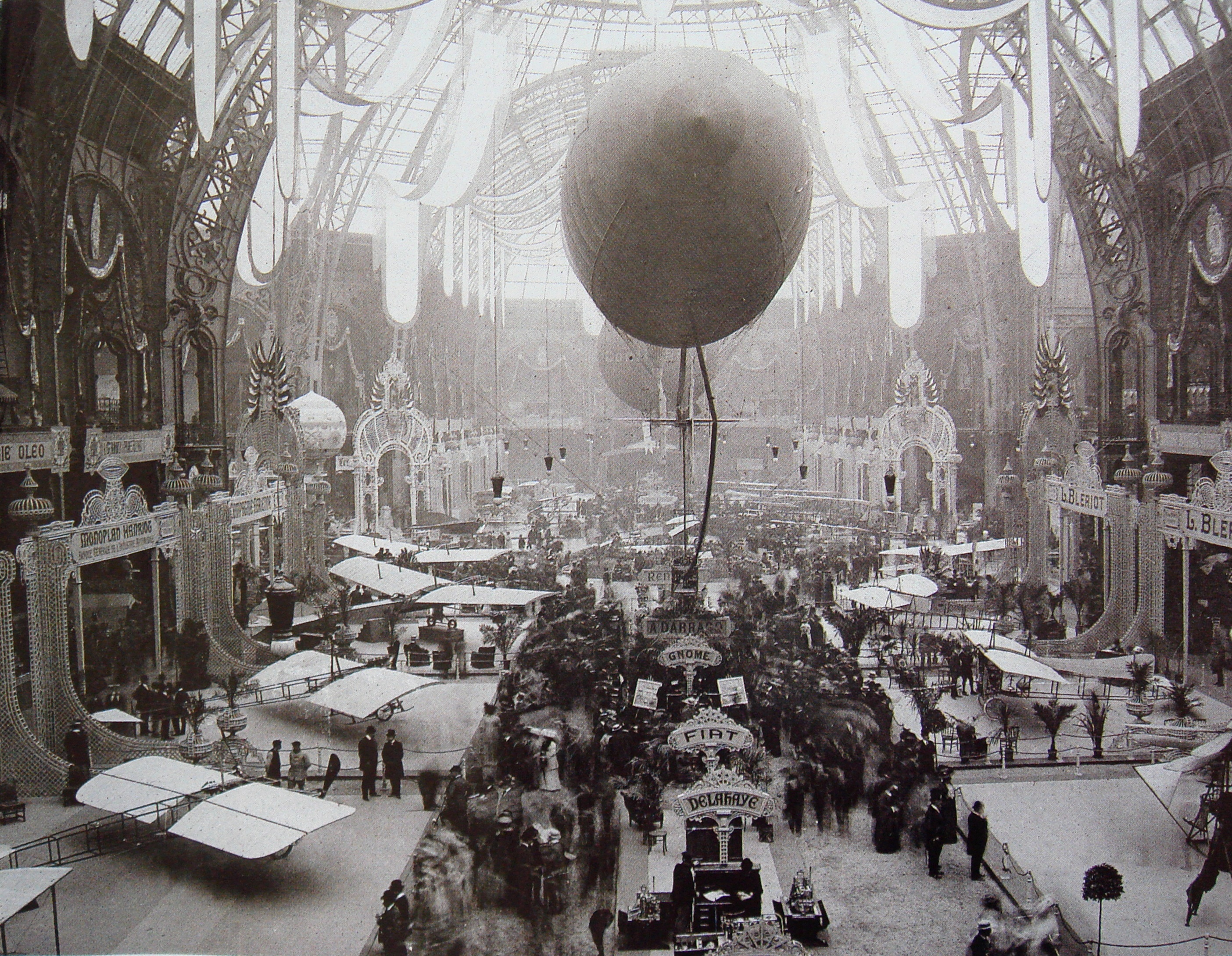
The Paris Aero Salon, 1909: the two Hanriot monoplanes at bottom left

== Specifications ==
Data from

General characteristics

- Crew: 1
- Length: 9.4 m (30 ft 10 in)
- Wingspan: 9.16 m (30 ft 1 in)
- Wing area: 24 m^{2} (260 sq ft)
- Empty weight: 400 kg (882 lb)
- Powerplant: 1 × Buchet 6-cylinder inline piston engine, water cooled, 37 kW (50 hp)
