= Lachassagne AL 3 =

French aircraft

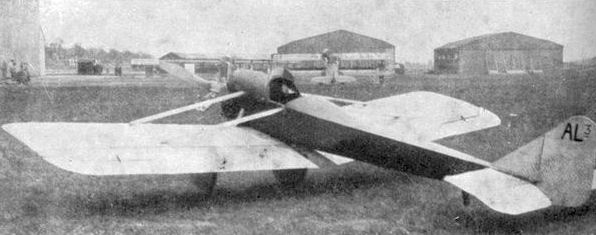

General information
- Type: Experimental aircraft
- National origin: France
- Designer: Adolphe Lachassagne
- Number built: 1

History
- First flight: mid-December 1925
- Variant: Lachassagne AL 5

The Lachassagne AL 3 was an experimental 1920s French aircraft designed to test a camber-changing wing meant to extend speed ranges. It was flown only briefly but led to a second design with similar features.

== Design and development ==
Early aircraft designers appreciated that whilst low take-off speeds required wings with high lift, high camber sections, more symmetric, low camber sections produced less drag at speed. One solution was to make a wing sufficiently flexible chordwise that the section could be altered in flight. This was the approach taken by Adolphe Lachassagne; his AL 3 was the first French monoplane with such a wing.

Details of the profile changing mechanism for the AL 3 are sparse, though each two spar wing was in two parts, a forward rigid metal structure and a rear flexible wooden structure. Both were fabric covered. On the later Lachassagne AL 5 the leading edge ahead of the forward spar was rigid but rotatable and the AL 3 may have had a similar feature. Its "minimum incidence" could be altered from 2° to 5°.

Apart from the camber-changing system the two wings were unremarkable; they were rectangular in plan, with a low aspect ratio of only 4.3, each joined low down onto the fuselage. On each side a pair of near-parallel struts braced the wing from the spars beyond half span to the upper fuselage. Very short and broad balanced ailerons were mounted at the tips.

The AL 3 had a flat-sided fuselage with rounded decking, built around ash longerons and covered with 3 mm (0.12 in) plywood. The pilot sat in an open cockpit between the wing spars. It was initially powered by an 13–15 kW (18–20 hp) Darracq flat twin engine, mounted with its cylinder heads exposed for air-cooling. This, like parts of the fuselage and its landing gear were not new; Lachassagne was not well funded. At the rear the trapezoidal tailplane had, like the wings, a rigid forward part and a camber changing rear section, though the latter had a wider range of angular movement than the wing and carried the elevators. The vertical tail was conventional, with a triangular fin and an unbalanced, round topped and straight edged rudder which reached down to the keel, working between the elevators.

The AL 3's 1.3 m (4 ft 3 in) track undercarriage seen from ahead formed a splayed M-form set of rigid, longitudinally wire braced struts. The large diameter wheels were mounted on half axles, hinged at the centre of the M and joined to its outer members by rubber shock absorbers. A tall tailskid protected the rudder.

The AL 3 took a long time to build, partly for financial reasons. Though it was entered into a 1923 event, it was not completed until 1925. It flew just before Christmas 1925, even though the Darraq engine was underperforming. By mid March 1926 the Darraq had been replaced by an Anzani engine of similar power presented to Lachassagne by the Association Française Aérienne in January to enable his work on the AL3 to continue. On 20 March 1926 AL 3 flew with this engine for the first time. Testing of the effects of camber changing began the next day; the Al 3's handling was good over a speed range of around 45–130 km/h (28–81 mph) but about a week later it was badly damaged when its wire braced undercarriage collapsed on landing. Despite the short testing period, Lachassagne felt the flight trials had demonstrated that the variable camber approach worked so, rather than rebuild the AL 3, he decided to build a development, the AL 5.

== Specifications ==
Data from Les Ailes 26 March 1925

General characteristics

- Crew: One
- Length: 4.70 m (15 ft 5 in)
- Wingspan: 6.0 m (19 ft 8 in)
- Height: 1.45 m (4 ft 9 in)
- Wing area: 8.3 m^{2} (89 sq ft)
- Aspect ratio: 4.3
- Empty weight: 135 kg (298 lb)
- Gross weight: 225 kg (496 lb)
- Fuel capacity: 15 kg (33 lb)
- Powerplant: 1 × Darracq air-cooled flat twin, 2.4 L (150 cu in), 13–15 kW (18–20 hp) at 1,800 rpm
- Propellers: 2-bladed, 1.65 m (5 ft 5 in) diameter
