= Hanriot HD.24 =

1920s French aircraft

HD.24
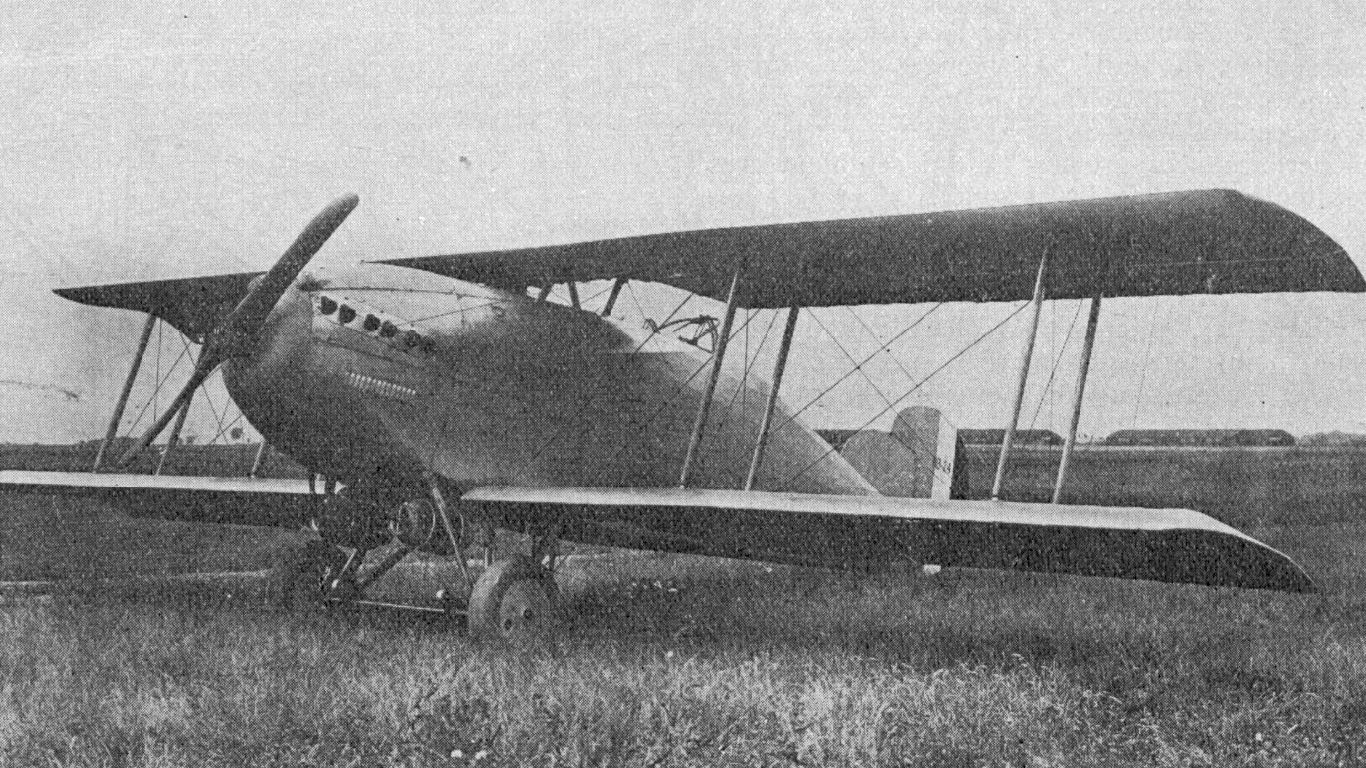

General information
- Type: Colonial police
- National origin: France
- Manufacturer: Hanriot

History
- First flight: 1922

The Hanriot HD.24 was a two-seat colonial police biplane aircraft built by Hanriot in the early 1920s.

Data from

General characteristics

- Crew: 2
- Length: 9.6 m (31 ft 6 in)
- Wingspan: 13.13 m (43 ft 1 in)
- Height: 3.5 m (11 ft 6 in)
- Wing area: 46 m^{2} (500 sq ft)
- Empty weight: 1,570 kg (3,461 lb)
- Gross weight: 2,820 kg (6,217 lb)
- Powerplant: 1 × Lorraine 12Da V-12 water-cooled piston engine, 280 kW (370 hp)

Performance

- Maximum speed: 188 km/h (117 mph, 102 kn)
- Range: 600 km (370 mi, 320 nmi)
- Service ceiling: 6,000 m (20,000 ft)
