= Hanriot HD.5 =

French WW1 fighter aircraft

HD.5

General information
- Type: Two seat fighter aircraft
- National origin: France
- Manufacturer: Aeroplanes Hanriot et Cie
- Designer: Emile Dupont
- Number built: 1

History
- First flight: late spring 1918

The Hanriot HD.5 was a French two-seat fighter aircraft prototype, built towards the end of World War I. A single-engine biplane with an unusually narrow gap between the upper and lower wings, it did not enter production.

== Design and development ==
Hanriot followed their successful HD.3 two-seat fighter with another of that kind, the bigger, heavier and more powerful HD.5. This was an equal span two bay biplane, the bays defined by two pairs of parallel interplane struts on each side, assisted by wire bracing. The wings were almost rectangular in planform, though with slightly angled tips, mounted without stagger. The interplane gap was unusually small, with the upper wing so close to the fuselage that its leading edge required a deep, slot-like cutout for the pilot's head. Behind him the trailing edge also had a cutout, this for the movement of the rear gunner's Lewis gun(s). The HD.5 had short span, horn balanced ailerons. Its tailplane, mounted on top of the fuselage, had a straight leading edge, angled tips and carried slightly tapered, horn-balanced elevators with a cutout for rudder movement. The fin was small but the rudder was broad chord and low; it was very rounded and extended down to the keel.

The fuselage of the HD.5 was flat-sided with rounded decking. The fighter was powered by a 300 hp (224 kW) Hispano-Suiza 8Fb upright V-8 engine, water-cooled with a rectangular frontal radiator, and had a fixed conventional undercarriage, with mainwheels on a single axle attached by V-struts to the lower fuselage, assisted by a tailskid.

The sole prototype began flight tests in the late spring of 1918 but there was no further development.

== Specifications ==
Data from Green & Swanborough p.277

General characteristics

- Crew: two
- Length: 7.34 m (24 ft 1 in)
- Wingspan: 10.63 m (34 ft 11 in)
- Height: 2.54 m (8 ft 4 in)
- Wing area: 30.40 m^{2} (327.2 sq ft)
- Empty weight: 800 kg (1,764 lb)
- Gross weight: 1,250 kg (2,756 lb)
- Powerplant: 1 × Hispano-Suiza 8Fb water-cooled upright V-8, 220 kW (300 hp)

Performance

- Maximum speed: 213 km/h (132 mph, 115 kn) at sea level
- Range: 490 km (300 mi, 260 nmi)

Armament

- Guns: 2 × fixed, synchronised 7.7 mm (0.303 in) Vickers machine guns plus 1 or 2 Lewis guns on mount in rear cockpit
