= 33mm A.P.X. =

Aircraft Weapon 1930s

1932 33mm Ateliers des Puteaux
- Type: Aircraft cannon
- Place of origin: France

Production history
- Designed: 1931 - 1936

Specifications
- Mass: 150 kg (330 lb)
- Length: 1,960 millimetres (77 inches)

The 33mm APX (French: Ateliers des Puteaux—"Puteaux workshops") was a series of 33 mm caliber autocannon manufactured in France during the early 1930s for use in aircraft.

The weapon was originally designed to be fitted to the Farman F.1010, a low-wing monoplane test-bed aircraft built to trial the cannon. Constructed by Ateliers des Puteaux, the cannon were tested by the French Government in the 1930s and intended to be shot through the propeller hub of an inverted V8 aircraft engine - but were not put into large scale production. A number of prototypes and versions were constructed during the 1930s, some purchased by Greece for testing. The weapon was also fitted to the Hanriot H.115 and KEA L.33, though interest in the weapon generally dwindled.

A number of variants were produced in the early 1930s, with differing muzzle velocity, fire rates and ammunition capacities - some designed specifically for the moteur canon (motor cannon) role. From the mid-1930s onwards, further development was conducted into following-on from the Oerlikon license produced cannons, including a new operating system to increase rate of fire, which eventually resulted in the famed H.S.404 auto cannon.

== Properties ==
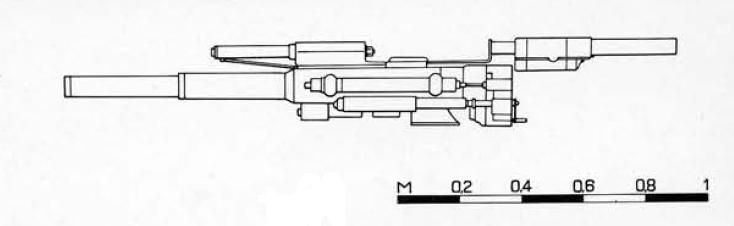
A diagram displaying the side-view of the cannon

The 1932 33mm Ateliers des Puteaux cannon fired a High-Explosive or Armour-Piercing round at 650 m/s and had a fire rate of 300 rounds per minute. Overall the weapon weighed 150 kg and was fed by a drum that could contain up to 35 rounds, firing rounds with up to 72g of explosive filler. The AP round was capable of penetrating up to 32 mm of armour at 500 metres. The later 1933 revision fired the same projectile at 900 m/s and retained the cylic fire rate, whilst being 10 kg lighter.

== Variants ==
Data from Williams, Anthony G. (2021). Autocannon : a history of automatic cannon and ammunition. Ramsbury: The Crowood Press. ISBN 978-1-78500-921-1. OCLC 1346317968.

Properties	1932 APX	1933 APX	Semi-Léger
Rate of Fire	300 rpm	300 rpm	
Muzzle Velocity	650/687 m/s	900 m/s	950 m/s
Cartridge	33x95 mm	33x95 mm	30x167 mm
Ammunition Capacity	35 shells	50 shells	

== Specifications (1932 33mm A.P.X. Cannon) ==
- Type: single-barrel automatic cannon
- Calibre: 33 x 95 mm (1.29 in)
- Operation: recoil-operated
- Weight without drum magazine: 129.75 kg (286 lb 1 oz)
- Weight (complete): 150 kg (330 lb 11 oz)
- Rate of fire: 300 rpm
- Muzzle velocity: 650–687 m/s (2,130–2,250 ft/s)
- Ammunition: AP and HE
- Projectile weight: HE: 630 g (22 oz), AP: 690 g (24 oz)
- HE and HEI rounds explosive filler: 72 g (2.5 oz)
- Length: 1,960 mm (77 in)
- Barrel Length: 700 mm (28 in)
