= Hanriot HD.20 =

HD.20

General information
- Type: Single seat shipboard fighter aircraft
- National origin: France
- Manufacturer: Aeroplanes Hanriot et Cie
- Designer: Ing. Najac
- Number built: 1

History
- First flight: 1923

The Hanriot HD.20 was a French single seat shipboard fighter aircraft prototype completed in 1923. Only one was built.

== Design and development ==
The Hanriot HD.20 was an all-metal two bay biplane, though the inner bay was relatively narrow. Outward leaning parallel pairs of interplane struts, assisted by wire bracing, divided the bays. The wings had significant stagger and the lower plane had the greater span; in plan the wings were straight edged, unswept and of constant chord, with angled tips. Ailerons were fitted only on the upper plane and were short span and overhung, that is, their horn balances projected beyond the wing tips.

The HD.20 had a braced, rectangular tailplane mounted on top of the fuselage and a small, curved edged fin. The elevators were balanced and the broad chord rudder, which met the flat top of the fin almost vertically, reached down to the keel and moved within an elevator cut-out.

The fighter was powered by a Hispano-Suiza 8Fb water-cooled upright V-8 engine. The pilot's open cockpit was over the trailing edge of the lower wing; both planes had central cut-outs to improve the pilot's view. A large Busteed inflatable buoyancy airbag between the undercarriage legs was provided for emergency landings on the sea. The HD.20 had a fixed tailskid undercarriage, with mainwheels on a single axle mounted on the lower fuselage longerons by two pairs of V-struts.

The HD.20 first flew in 1923 and flight testing explored its higher altitude performance, but then tests and development were ended.

== Specifications ==
Data from Green & Swanborough p.278-9

General characteristics

- Crew: One
- Length: 8.10 m (26 ft 7 in)
- Wingspan: 12.50 m (41 ft 0 in)
- Wing area: 40.00 m^{2} (430.6 sq ft)
- Gross weight: 1,360 kg (2,998 lb)
- Powerplant: 1 × Hispano-Suiza 8Fb 8-cylinder upright water-cooled supercharged V-8, 220 kW (300 hp)

Performance

- Maximum speed: 205 km/h (127 mph, 111 kn)
- Service ceiling: 9,800 m (32,200 ft)
- Time to altitude: 12 min to 5,000 m (16,405ft)

Armament

- Guns: 2 × fixed, forward firing 7.7 mm (0.303 in) machine guns intended
