= Hanriot HD.22 =

1920s French aircraft

HD.22
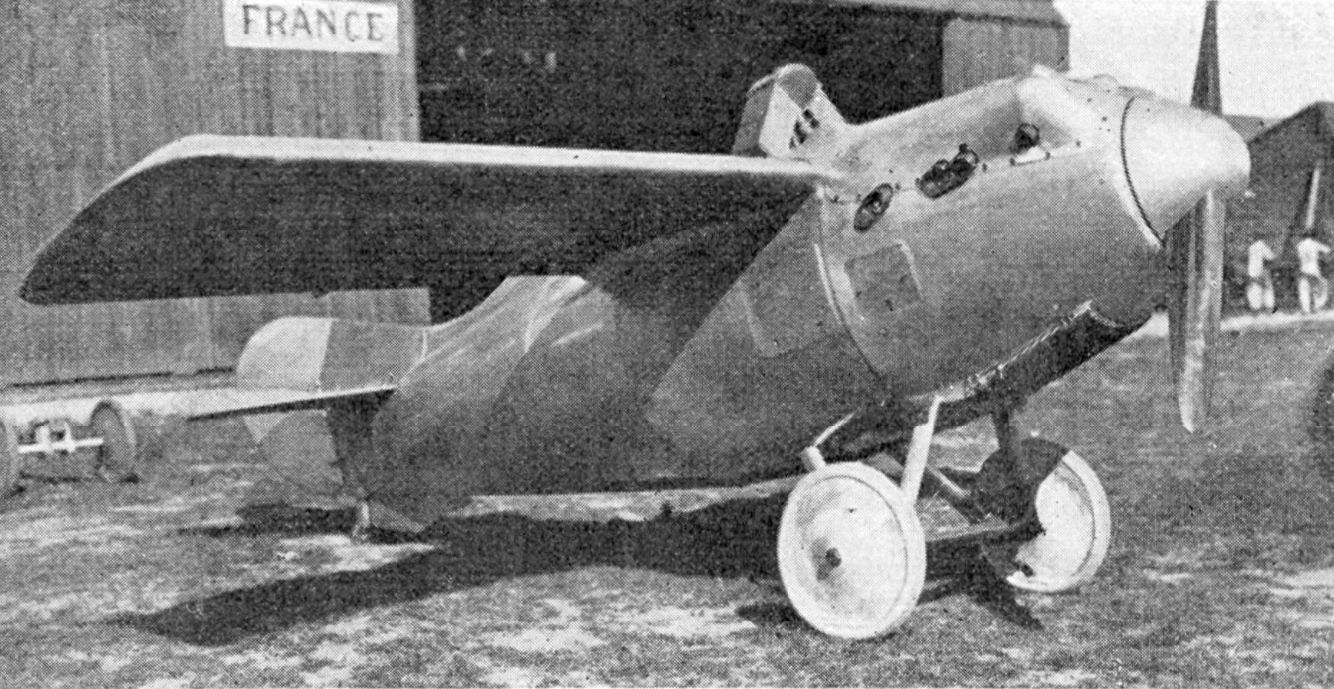

General information
- Type: Racing aircraft
- National origin: France
- Manufacturer: Hanriot
- Number built: 1

History
- First flight: 1921

The Hanriot HD.22 was a racer aircraft built by Hanriot in the early 1920s.

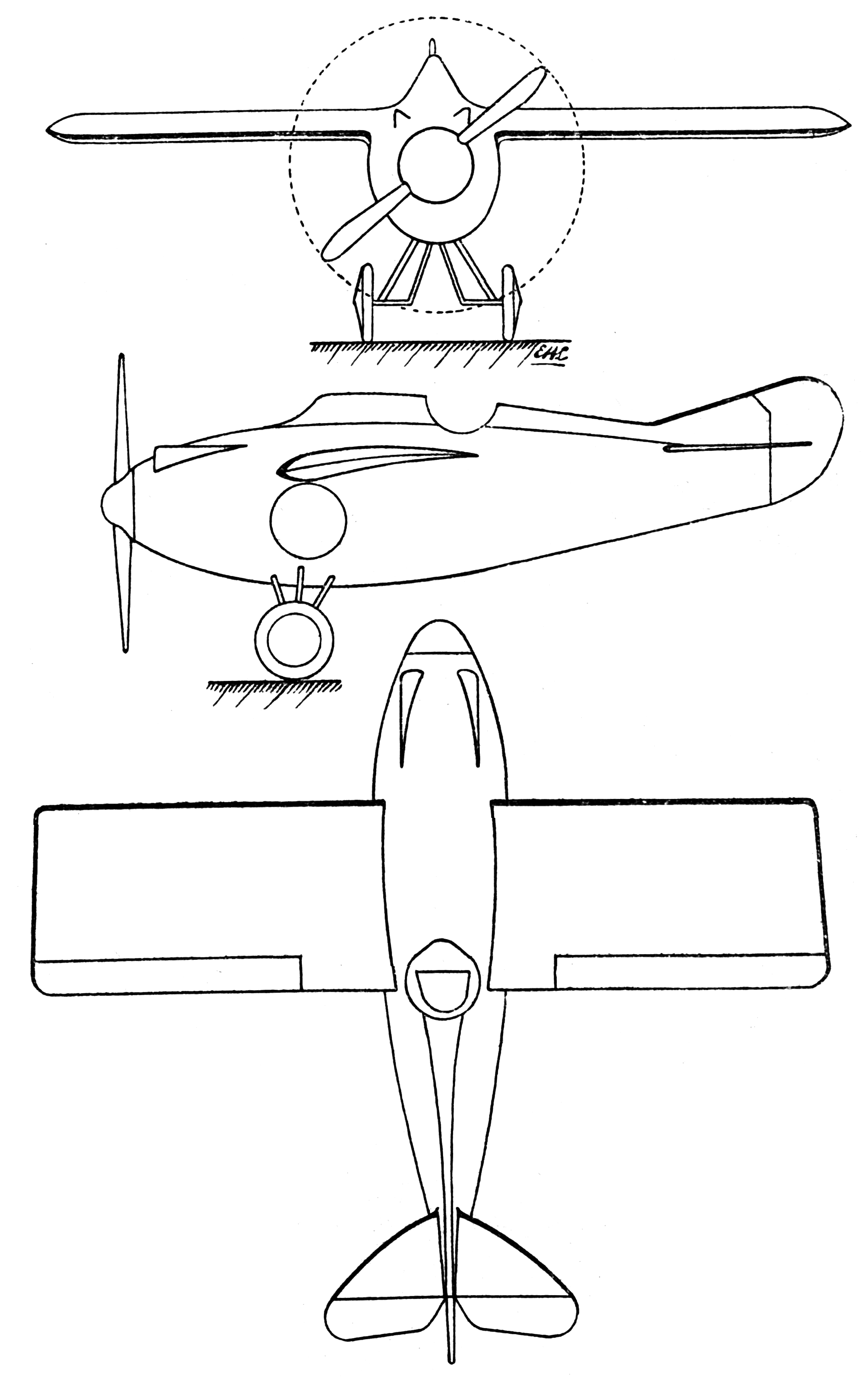
3-view

== Design ==
The HD.22 was a high-wing monoplane intended for the Coupe Deutsch de la Meurthe. It had an all-metal fuselage.

== Specifications ==
Data from

General characteristics

- Crew: 1
- Length: 5.93 m (19 ft 5 in)
- Wingspan: 6.38 m (20 ft 11 in)
- Height: 2.20 m (7 ft 3 in)
- Wing area: 7.50 m^{2} (80.7 sq ft)
- Gross weight: 800 kg (1,764 lb)
- Powerplant: 1 × Hispano-Suiza 8Fb V-8 water-cooled piston engine, 220 kW (300 hp)
- Propellers: 2-bladed fixed-pitch propeller

Performance

- Maximum speed: 133 km/h (83 mph, 72 kn) at sea level. It is not certain if these performance figures relate to the MS.180 or the MS.181.
- Cruise speed: 360 km/h (220 mph, 190 kn)
