= Hanriot H.34 =

Basic trainer designed in France in 1924

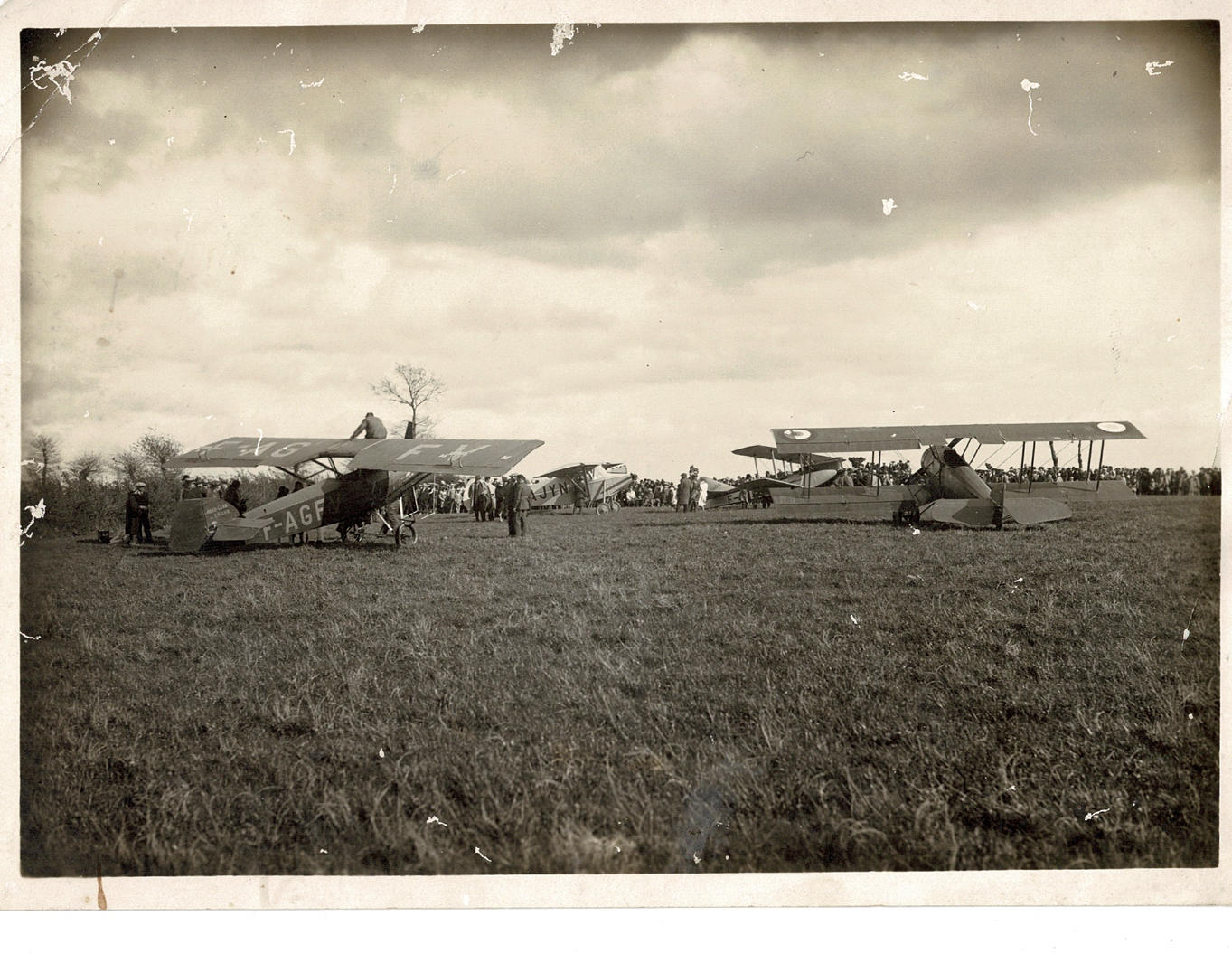
- Hanriot H.34 (F-AGFV) on the left.

General information
- Type: Training aircraft
- National origin: France
- Manufacturer: Avions Hanriot
- Number built: 1 (possibly 3)

History
- First flight: 1924
- Developed into: Hanriot H.35, Hanriot H.36

The Hanriot H.34 was a basic trainer designed in France in 1924 which did not reach production. It was a parasol wing aircraft, seating two in tandem.

== Design and development ==
The parasol winged Hanriot H.34 was intended to complement the very successful biplane HD.14. It was designed to be easy to fly and, with a low wing loading, to have low stalling and landing speeds. Both types placed instructor and pupil in tandem, with dual controls.

The wing of the H.34 was in three parts. The two outer sections had parallel, straight and unswept leading and trailing edges and straight, angled tips. They were also cut away at their inner ends, where they met a rectangular, reduced chord centre section, producing a cut-out out over the rear seat. Narrow chord ailerons filled most of the trailing edge. The wings were of mixed construction with pairs of duralumin spars and wooden ribs but the ailerons were all-metal. Pairs of parallel, rearward-leaning struts linked the lower fuselage and the outer wing spars and four vertical struts from the upper fuselage to the centre section formed a cabane.

The H.34 was powered initially by a 60 kW (80 hp) Le Rhône 9C rotary engine, but could also be powered by 67 kW (90 hp) Anzani 10C or 89 kW (120 hp) Salmson 9Ac radial engines. Its neat cowling merged into the circular section, aluminium-covered front fuselage which extended back to the forward cockpit. The cockpit section and rear fuselage had a rectangular section defined by four spruce longerons and was fabric covered. The instructor sat in the forward seat, with the pupil behind in a cockpit wide enough to accept two sitting side-by-side if necessary.

Aft, the fuselage tapered in plan to a conventional empennage. Its tailplane, with a similar plan to the wing, was mounted on top of the fuselage at an angle of incidence that could be adjusted in flight. It was braced by parallel pairs of struts from the lower longerons and carried angular elevators. The fin was rounded, bearing a full, curved rudder which reached down to the keel and operated in an elevator cut-out.

The H.34 had fixed, tailskid landing gear, with its mainwheels 1.80 m (5 ft 11 in) apart on an axle articulated in the centre. The outer ends of the axle were rubber sprung on V-struts from the lower longerons and its centre supported from a false axle.

The first flight was made in 1924; though the date is unknown, it was flying by mid-September, taking part in the Auvergne aero-club national rally. By November it was under test at Villacoublay.

The H.34 was developed into the Hanriot H.35 advanced trainer which had the same layout and appearance and a wing of the same construction and dimensions, but with a much more powerful 130 kW (180 hp) Hispano-Suiza 8Ab and an dural-framed fuselage. It was longer, heavier and faster.

== Variants ==
H.34
The basic original aircraft powered by a 60 kW (80 hp) Le Rhône 9C.
H.34bis
Powered by an Anzani 10C of 67 kW (90 hp). At least one built or converted from the H.34.
H.34ter
Powered by a 89 kW (120 hp) Salmson 9Ac. At least one built or converted from the H.34.
H.35
A trainer derived from the H.34, powered by a 130 kW (180 hp) Hispano-Suiza 8Ab. 13 built.
H.36
Floatplane development of the H.35, powered by a 89 kW (120 hp) Salmson 9Ac. 1 built (50 floatplane versions ordered by Yugoslavia, delivery/production uncertain.)

== Specifications (H.34) ==
Data from Les Ailes, November 1924

General characteristics

- Crew: Two, instructor and pupil
- Length: 6.96 m (22 ft 10 in)
- Wingspan: 11.40 m (37 ft 5 in)
- Wing area: 22 m^{2} (240 sq ft)
- Empty weight: 396 kg (873 lb)
- Gross weight: 646 kg (1,424 lb)
- Powerplant: 1 × le Rhône 9C air-cooled rotary piston engine, 60 kW (80 hp)
- Propellers: 2-bladed

Performance

- Maximum speed: 135 km/h (84 mph, 73 kn)
- Stall speed: 55 km/h (34 mph, 30 kn)
- Endurance: 3 hr
- Service ceiling: 4,500 m (14,800 ft)
