= Marcel Haegelen =

French flying ace (1896–1950)

Marcel Haeglen
- Born: 13 September 1896; Belfort, France
- Died: 24 May 1950 (aged 53); Hospital of Val-de-Grâce, Paris, France
- Burial place: Cemetery of Ris-Orangis
- Military career
- Allegiance: France
- Branch: Air Service
- Rank: Colonel
- Units: Escadrille 8 Escadrille 3 Escadrille 100; 5th Fighter Group "Kos"
- Conflicts: World War I World War II
- Awards: Legion of Honour (Grand Officer); Médaille militaire Croix de Guerre with 15 palmes and three etoiles de vermeile

Colonel Marcel Émile Haegelen (13 September 1896 – 24 May 1950), Légion d'honneur, Médaille militaire, Croix de Guerre, was a World War I French flying ace credited with 22 victories.

== Biography ==
=== Early life and military service ===
Claude Marcel Haeglen was born on 13 September 1896 in Belfort, France.

On 15 September 1914, he volunteered for military service as an infantryman. On 27 May 1915, he was forwarded for pilot training. He graduated training with a Military Pilot's Brevet on 10 January 1916. On 10 April, he was posted to Escadrille 8. After service with this reconnaissance squadron, he went to fighter training on 8 February 1917, and was assigned to Escadrille 3 a month later. He shot down two German airplanes, on 27 and 28 May, being wounded on the latter day.

During his lengthy convalescence, he was promoted out of the enlisted ranks to become a Sous lieutenant on 25 January 1918. On 11 March 1918, he was posted to Escadrille Spa.100. Joining in this unit's "wolf pack" tactics, Haeglen would shoot down another 20 enemy aircraft by war's end, including 12 observation balloons.

=== After World War I ===
After the war, he became a test pilot for the Hanriot company and gained a reputation as an aerobatic pilot. In 1931 and 1932 he won the Coupe Michelin long-distance flying competition flying the Lorraine Hanriot LH.41/2 aircraft. On the second one, he set a world record for 2000 km with a speed of 263.900 km/h.

Haeglen also became president of the French Civil Pilots Union.

=== World War II and beyond ===
Mobilised as fighter pilot at the beginning of World War II, lieutenant-colonel Marcel Haegelen won his 24th victory flying a Curtiss H 75, shooting down a German airplane on 14 June 1940.

After the fall of France in World War II, he became a member of the French Resistance, and was arrested by the Germans in 1943 and jailed in Bourges.

When he died on 24 May 1950 at Val-de-Grace, he held the rank of Colonel, and was a Grand officier of Légion d'honneur.

== Honors and awards ==
- Médaille Militaire: 23 August 1917
- Chevalier of the Legion d'honneur: 19 July 1918
- Raised to Officier of the Legion d'honneur: Date uncertain
- Croix de Guerre with 15 palmes and three etoile de vermeile: Date(s) uncertain
