= Hanriot H.35 =

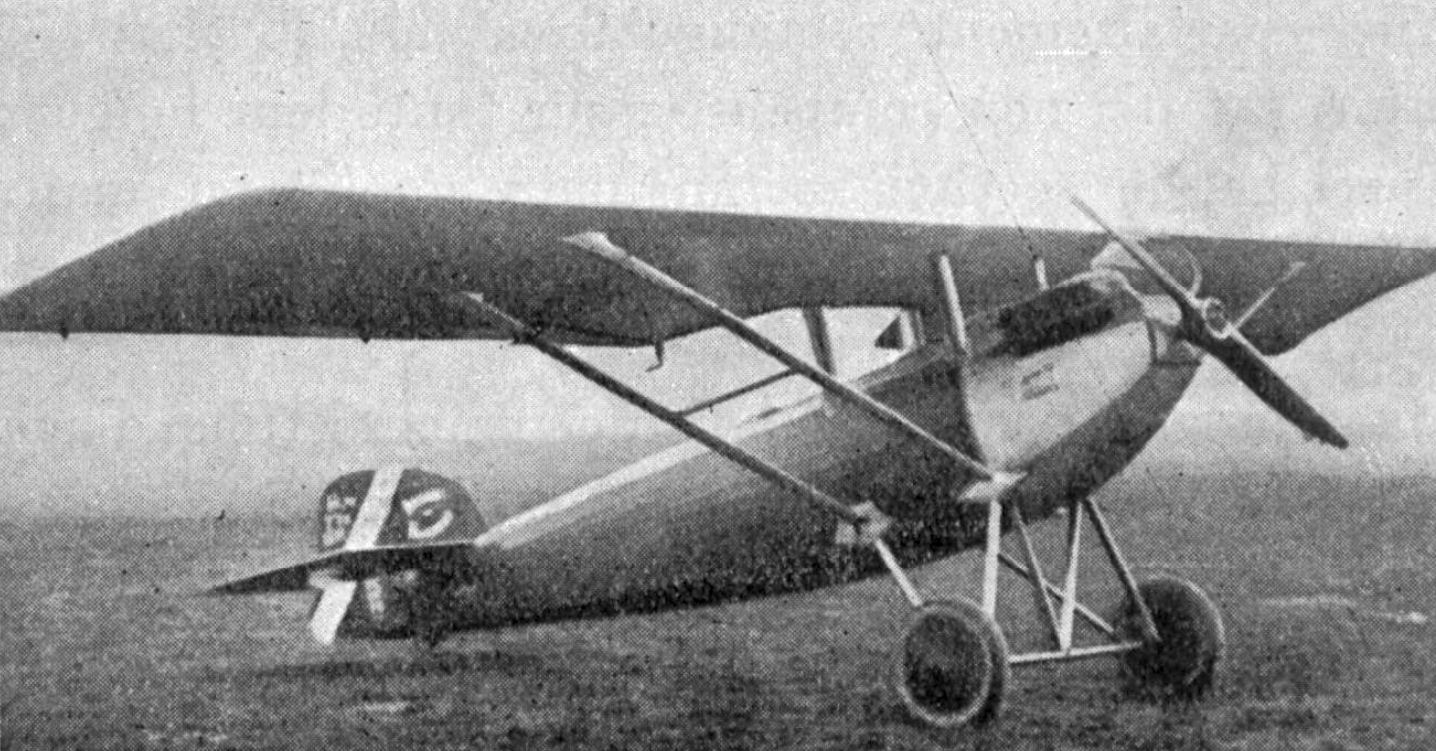

General information
- Type: Intermediate training monoplane
- National origin: France
- Manufacturer: Avions Hanriot
- Number built: 12+

The Hanriot H.35 was a 1920s French intermediate training monoplane designed and built by Avions Hanriot.

== Design and development ==
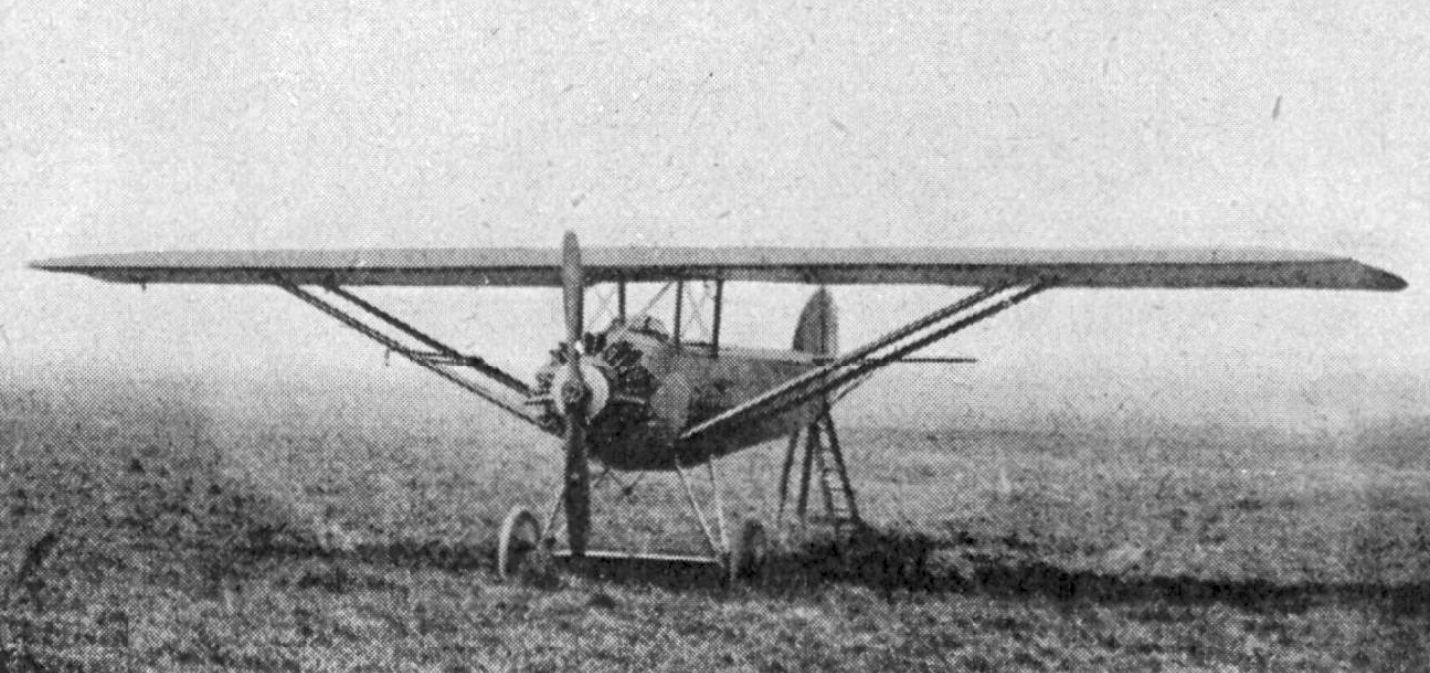
Hanriot H.36 photo from L'Aéronautique January,1926

The H.35 was developed from the earlier H.34 basic trainer and was a two-seat strut-braced parasol monoplane. The H.35 was powered by a 180 hp (134 kW) Hispano-Suiza 8Ab piston engine. Twelve aircraft were built for use with the Hanriot flying school and also the Societe Francaise d'Aviation at Orly.

A 1925 development of the H.35 was the H.36 which was a twin-float equipped version powered by a 120 hp (89 kW) Salmson 9Ac piston engine. An order for 50 H.36s was placed by Yugoslavia.

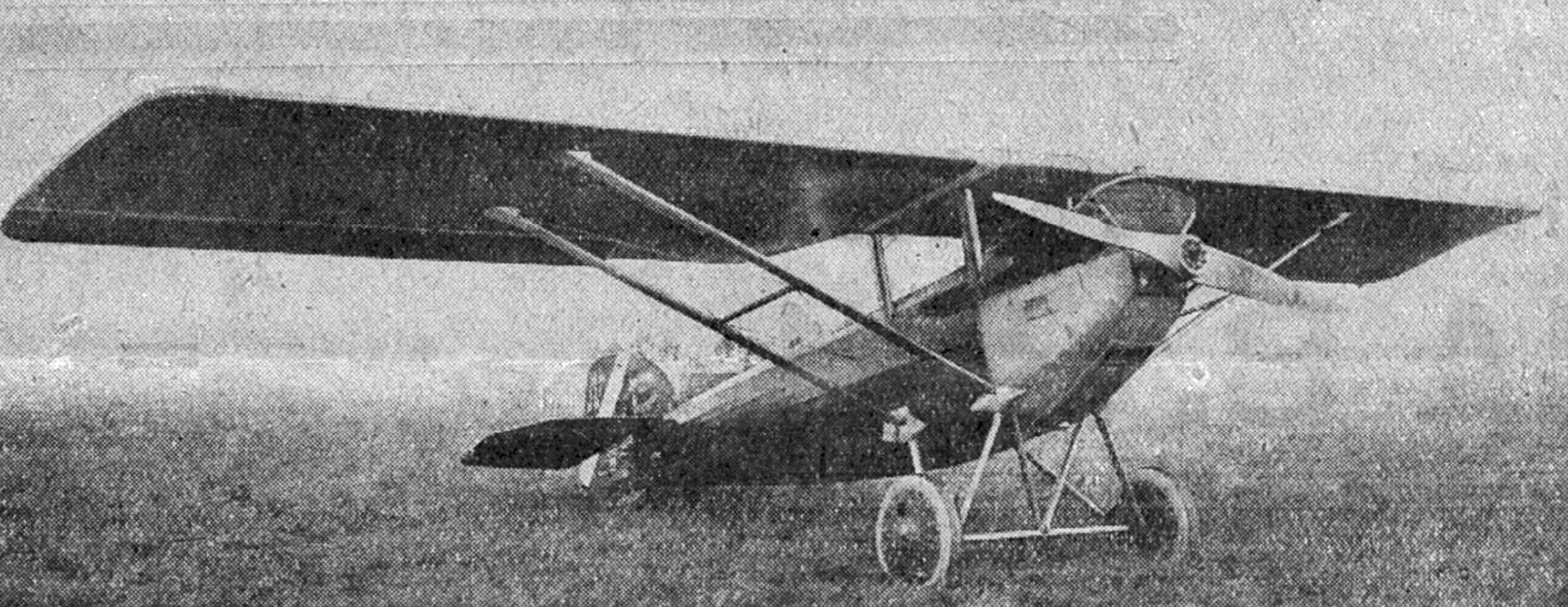
another view of the H.35

== Specifications (H.35) ==
Data from Illustrated Encyclopedia of Aircraft

General characteristics

- Crew: 2
- Length: 7.60 m (24 ft 11.25 in)
- Wingspan: 11.39 m (37 ft 4.5 in)
- Height: 2.70 m (8 ft 10.25 in)
- Wing area: 22.00 m^{2} (236.81 sq ft)
- Empty weight: 680 kg (1,499 lb)
- Gross weight: 945 kg (2,083 lb)
- Powerplant: 1 × Hispano-Suiza 8Ab water-cooled eight-cylinder Vee piston engine , 134 kW (180 hp)

Performance

- Maximum speed: 185 km/h (115 mph, 100 kn)
- Range: 320 km (199 mi, 173 nmi)
- Service ceiling: 5,000 m (16,405 ft)
