= Hanriot HD.3 =

French WW1 fighter aircraft

HD.3 C.2 and HD.4
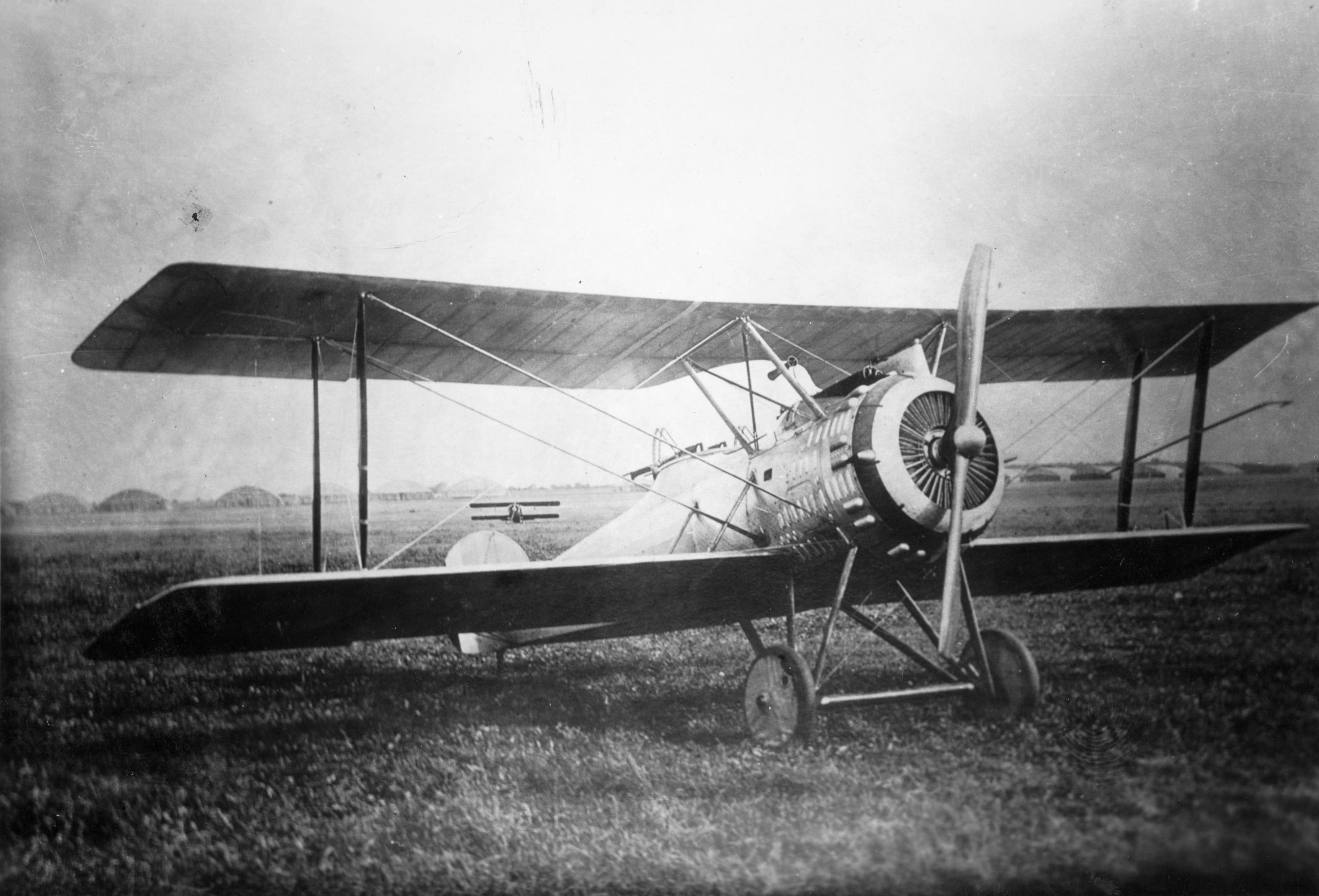

General information
- Type: Fighter
- National origin: France
- Manufacturer: Hanriot
- Designer: Emile Dupont
- Primary users: Aéronautique Militaire Aéronautique Maritime
- Number built: ca. 90

History
- First flight: June 1917

The Hanriot HD.3 C.2 was a two-seat fighter aircraft produced in France during World War I.

== Design and development ==
Similar in appearance to a scaled-up HD.1, the Hanriot HD.3 was a conventional, single-bay biplane with staggered wings of equal span. The pilot and gunner sat in tandem, open cockpits and the main units of the fixed tailskid undercarriage were linked by a cross-axle. Short struts braced the fuselage sides to the lower wing.

== Operational history ==
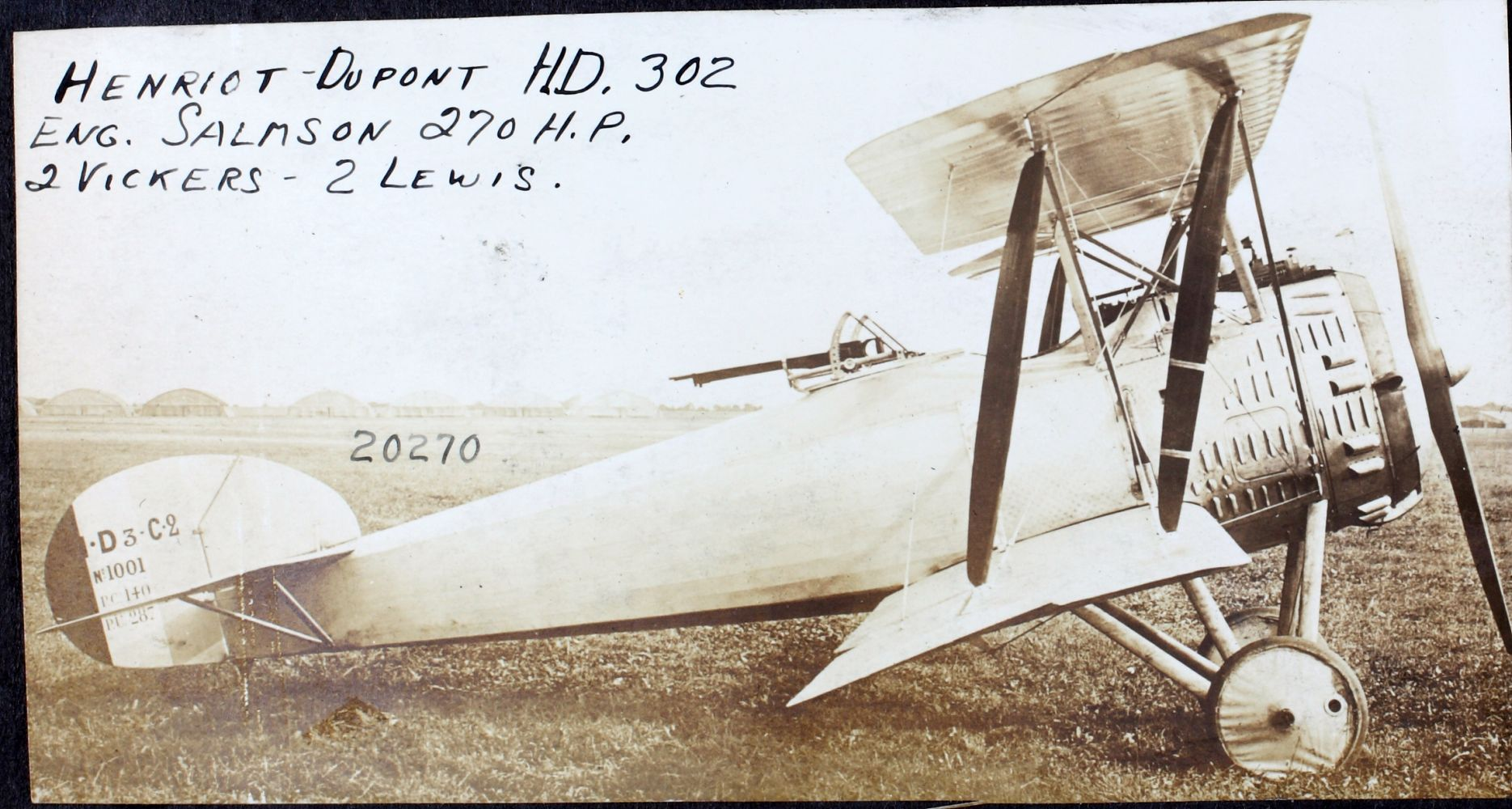
Hanriot HD.3 C.2 side

Flight testing revealed excellent performance, and the French government ordered 300 of the type in 1918, in preparation for a major offensive the following year. When the war ended, the contract was cancelled with around 75 aircraft having been delivered to the Aéronautique Militaire and at least 15 to the Aéronautique Maritime. One example was delivered to the Aéronautique Maritime in summer 1918 equipped with twin float undercarriage and a larger tailfin; it was intended that this would be the prototype of a dedicated floatplane fighter designated HD.4, but the war ended before any further development took place. The Armistice also led to the abandonment of a dedicated night fighter variant, the HD.3bis, with enlarged and balanced ailerons and rudder and with a wing of increased section.

After the war, one of the navy's machines was used for trials aboard the new aircraft carrier Béarn, while another was used for floatation tests at the Isle of Grain.

== Variants ==
HD.3 C.2

Main production version

HD.3bis CN.2
Nightfighter prototype with thick wing section and revised control surfaces (1 built)
HD.4
Floatplane derivative of HD.3. One built.
HD.9 Ap.1
Single-seat photo-reconnaissance biplane, powered by a 190 kW (260 hp) Salmson 9Za water-cooled radial piston engine. Ten evaluation aircraft were ordered, with the first completed in November 1918.

== Operators ==
France

- French Navy

Kingdom of Italy

- Aeronautica Militare

== Specifications (HD.3 C.2) ==
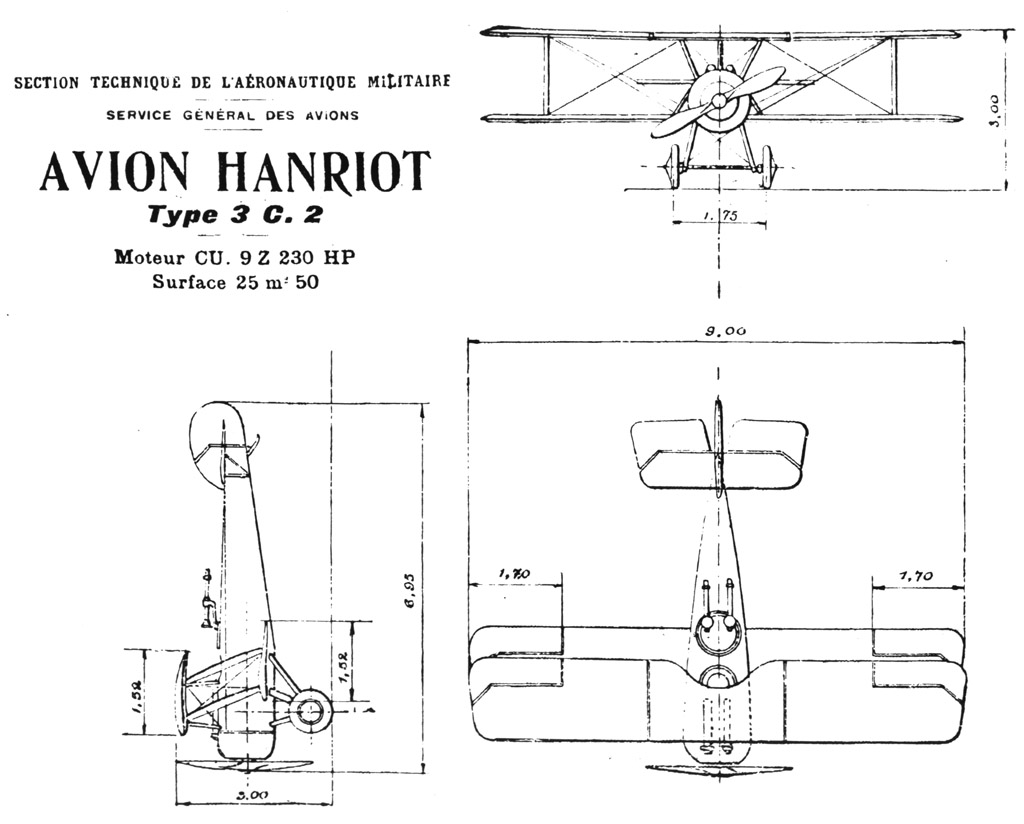
Hanriot HD.3 C.2 drawing

Data from War Planes of the First World War

General characteristics

- Crew: Two, pilot and gunner
- Length: 6.95 m (22 ft 10 in)
- Wingspan: 9.00 m (29 ft 6 in)
- Height: 3.00 m (9 ft 10 in)
- Wing area: 25.5 m^{2} (274 sq ft)
- Empty weight: 760 kg (1,676 lb)
- Gross weight: 1,180 kg (2,601 lb)
- Powerplant: 1 × Salmson 9Za nine-cylinder water-cooled radial engine, 190 kW (260 hp)

Performance

- Maximum speed: 192 km/h (119 mph, 104 kn) at 2,000 m (6,600 ft)
- Endurance: 2 hr
- Service ceiling: 5,700 m (18,700 ft)
- Time to altitude: 12 min 16 s to 3,000 ft (910 m)

Armament

- Guns:
  - 2 × fixed, forward-firing .303 Vickers machine guns
  - 2 × trainable, rearward-firing .303 Lewis guns
