= Hanriot =

French aircraft manufacturer

Aéroplanes Hanriot et Cie.
- Industry: Aeronautics, defence
- Founded: 1907
- Founder: René Hanriot
- Defunct: 1936
- Fate: Merged
- Successor: Société Nationale de Constructions Aéronautiques du Centre
- Headquarters: Bétheny, Boulogne-Billancourt, Carrières-sur-Seine and Bourges, France
- Products: Aircraft

Aéroplanes Hanriot et Cie. or simply Hanriot (English: /ɒ̃ˈriːoʊ/ ahn-REE-oh, French: [ɑ̃ʁjo]) was a French aircraft manufacturer with roots going back to the beginning of aviation. Founded by René Hanriot in 1910 as The Monoplans Hanriot Company Ltd., the company survived in different forms until 1916 when it established itself with the Hanriot-Dupont (HD.) fighters and observation aircraft. The company lasted through several takeovers and structural changes until, in 1936, it merged with Farman to become the Société Nationale de Constructions Aéronautiques du Centre (SNCAC). 'Central Air Works' consortium.

Hanriot aeroplanes included pre-war monoplanes with boat-like fuselages, the HD.1 and 2 World War I biplane fighters, the HD.14 trainer, and the H.220 series of twin-engined heavy fighters that eventually evolved into the SNCAC 600 fighter just before World War II.,

The company's main bases of operations were Bétheny (a suburb of Reims) Boulogne-Billancourt, Carrières-sur-Seine and Bourges.

== History ==
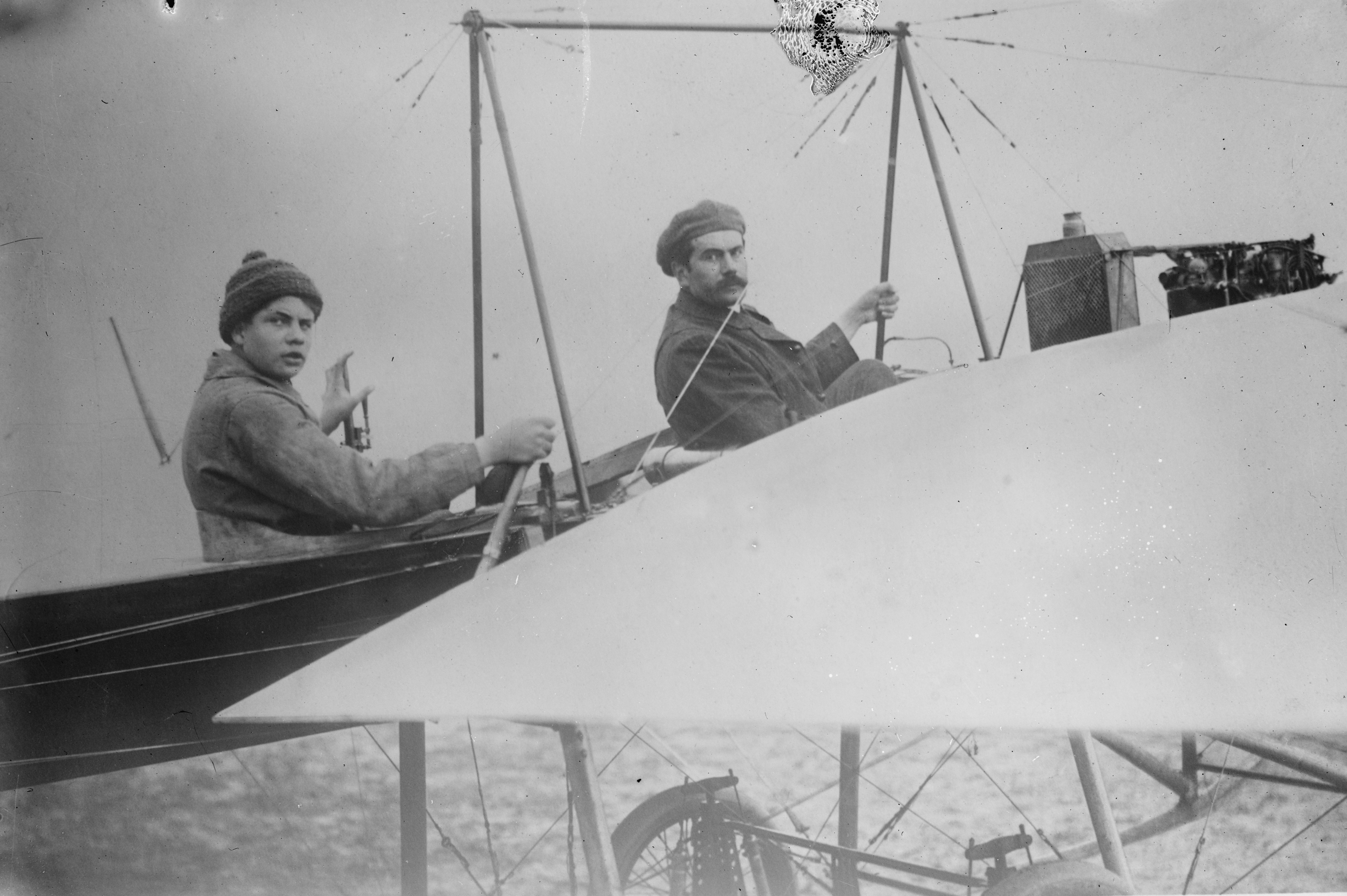
Marcel Hanriot and René Hanriot in 1911.

René Hanriot, a builder and racer of motor boats and a race car driver for the Darracq motor company, built his first aircraft in 1907, although it did not fly until late 1909. It was a monoplane with a wire-braced wooden fuselage resembling the Blériot XI However, it was almost immediately superseded by a series of similar monoplanes, which were exhibited at the Brussels Salon d'Automobiles, d'Aeronautique, du Cycles et dus Sports in January 1910. These featured a slender wooden monocoque fuselage and were powered by a 20 hp Darracq and a 40 hp Gyp. and a handful were built. Together with Darracq racing colleague Louis Wagner, Hanriot started a flying school at Bétheny near Reims, where the Hanriot factory was located. Beatrix de Rijk, the first Dutch woman to earn a pilot's licence, learned to fly there. Unusually, Hanriot tested new design features using a flying model powered by a 2 kW (3 hp) Duthiel-Chalmers.

In 1910, Hanriot and his staff pilots regularly appeared at air shows in France and England. Hanriot's 15-year-old son Marcel Hanriot became the youngest holder of a pilot's certificate and joined his father's pilots as a competition flyer. René Hanriot then withdrew from competition flying himself and concentrated on constructing aircraft.

Hanriot's 1911 military two-seater was passed over at the French military trials, among other reasons, because its fuselage was so slender that the crew were completely unshielded. It was obsolete and never had a serious chance against contemporary Nieuport, Morane-Saulnier and Deperdussin types. Nieuport's former chief engineer Alfred Pagny designed the 1912 Hanriot, and the Nieuport influence was clearly visible. Still, it failed to gain any orders at the 1912 military trials and attempts to sell them were unsuccessful. Faced with bankruptcy, René Hanriot sold his assets to Louis Alfred Ponnier, who reorganised the company as the Société de Construction de Machines pour la Navigation Aérienne (CMNA), headed by Pagny. In 1913, Marcel Hanriot, now 18, was called up for military service.

The Ponnier factory continued to develop monoplane racers for several years, one of which placed second in the 1913 Gordon Bennett Trophy competition.

Following the outbreak of World War I, Marcel Hanriot, still in military service, flew French Air Force bombers. The German advance stalled with the CMNA/Ponnier factories in Rheims behind German lines, but René Hanriot founded a new factory, Aéroplanes Hanriot et Cie, in Levallois. Starting as a subcontractor building aeroplane components, the company progressed to licence-build aircraft from other manufacturers (notably the Sopwith 1 A.2 and Salmson 2 A.2). In 1915, Marcel Hanriot, after being seriously wounded in a night-flying raid, was released from military service and joined his father's factory. Around the same time, Hanriot hired the young engineer Emile Dupont, and in 1916, the Dupont-designed fighter HD.1 was produced. Although being passed over by the French Air Force in favour of the more powerful SPAD VII design, the HD.1 was ordered by the Belgian and Italian Air Force. Heavy demand resulted in a new factory being opened in Boulogne-Billancourt (84, rue des Moulineaux). Licences to build the HD.1 were also sold to Macchi in Italy. Hanriot produced 5000 aircraft and employed 2000 workers in his Boulogne-Billancourt factory alone.

After the war, Hanriot continued to manufacture fighters and all-purpose aircraft, building on the HD.1 / HD.2 series and bringing out new biplane and monoplane designs. In 1924, having outgrown its Boulogne-Billancourt works, the company moved to Carrières-sur-Seine

René Hanriot died on 7 November 1925. His heirs, Marcel and his two brothers-in-law, entrusted daily operations of the factories to Outhenin Chalandre, formerly director of a paper mill. In 1930, the Hanriot company became part of the Lorraine-Dietrich company under the name Lorraine-Hanriot. The merger lasted three years until 1933 when the two companies separated, and Marcel Hanriot stepped forward again to lead his family business. Under his management, the company embarked on an ambitious project to design and build state-of-the-art metal military aircraft like the H.220 heavy fighter. However, its main successes would be with the liaison/training monoplane H.180/H.182 and the twin-engined H.232/H.232 trainer

In 1936, the company was included in Pierre Cot's nationalisation programme. In 1937, It Merged with Farman to become the Société Nationale de Constructions Aéronautiques du Centre. Unlike Maurice Farman, who left the new company in protest, Marcel Hanriot remained one of the directors.

== Nomenclature ==
- The pre-war aircraft designed by René Hanriot went by Roman Numerals, the 1907 monoplane being the 'Type I'. Usually, planes were identified by their year of build, number of seats, engine, and horsepower. Thus Hanriot's first aeroplane was the '1907 monoplane', type IV was the '1911 military two-seater', and the Hanriot VIII was known as the 'Hanriot 100 ch' (100 Hp Hanriot). The two-seater monoplane designed by Pagny is commonly known as the Hanriot 1912 monoplane or the Hanriot-Pagny 1912 monoplane.
- The World War I and later biplanes designed by Pierre Dupont received the code 'HD.' followed by a consecutive Arabic number (HD.1, HD.8, HD.32 ...)
- During the short stint as Lorraine-Hanriot, the designation HD. was kept for aircraft already in production, but the prefix was changed to LH. for new designs. Around this time, Hanriot also adopted other French factories' habit of adding a number for the subtype directly behind the two-digit type number. Thus, the HD.32-series 0 became the HD.320, the next improvement, series 1, became the HD.321 and so on.
- After the merger with Lorraine was dissolved, Hanriot aircraft adopted the single letter 'H.', again followed by a design number. It also kept the now universal French habit of adding the subseries number directly behind the design number. (Hanriot H.180/H.182)

== Aircraft ==
- Hanriot 1909 monoplane
- Hanriot I
- Hanriot Type II
- Hanriot III
- Hanriot IV Hanriot 1911 military two-seater (Type IV)
- Hanriot V Hanriot 1910 monoplane (Type V)
- Hanriot VI Hanriot 1910 monoplane (Type VI)
- Hanriot VII
- Hanriot VIII Hanriot 100 ch monoplane (Type VII)
- Hanriot IX
- Hanriot-Pagny 1912 monoplane
- Hanriot HD.1
- Hanriot HD.2
- Hanriot HD.3
- Hanriot HD.4
- Hanriot HD.5
- Hanriot HD.6
- Hanriot HD.7
- Hanriot HD.8
- Hanriot HD.9
- Hanriot HD.12
- Hanriot HD.14
- Hanriot HD.15
- Hanriot HD.17
- Hanriot HD.18
- Hanriot HD.19
- Hanriot HD.20
- Hanriot HD.22
- Hanriot HD.24
- Hanriot H.25
- Hanriot H.26
- Hanriot HD.28
- Hanriot H.31
- Hanriot HD.32
- Hanriot H.33
- Hanriot H.34
- Hanriot H.35
- Hanriot H.36
- Hanriot H.38
- Lorraine-Hanriot LH.10
- Lorraine-Hanriot LH.21S
- Lorraine-Hanriot LH.30
- Hanriot H.41
- Hanriot H.43
- Lorraine-Hanriot LH.60
- Lorraine-Hanriot LH.70
- Hanriot H.110
- Hanriot H.115
- Hanriot HD.120
- Lorraine-Hanriot LH.130
- Hanriot H.180/H.182
- Hanriot H.220/SNCAC 600
- Hanriot H.2300/H.232
