= List of gliders (H) =

This is a list of gliders/sailplanes of the world, (this reference lists all gliders with references, where available) Note: Any aircraft can glide for a short time, but gliders are designed to glide for longer.

== H ==
=== Haefli-Lergier ===
(A. Haefli & L. Lergier)

- Thuner-Gleiter

=== Hafner-Rath ===
(Raoul Hafner & Josef Rath)

- Hafner-Rath HR-1 Gelse

=== Hagiwara ===
(Hagiwara Kakkuki Seisakusho - Hagiwara Glider Co.)

- Horikawa H-22
- Horikawa H-23
- Horikawa H-32

=== Haig ===
(Larry Haig)

- Haig Minibat

=== HAL ===
(Hindustan Aeronautics Limited)

- HAL G-1 – Hindustan Aeronautics Limited – India
- HAL X-241 (HF-24 glider)

=== Hall ===
(Stan Hall)

- Hall Cherokee II
- Hall Cherokee RM
- Hall-Leonard Annebula
- Hall Ibex
- Hall Vector I

=== Haller ===
(Oldřich Haller)

- Haller ZA-2

=== Halloran-Wedd ===
(Clyde Halloran & William G. Wedd)

- Halloran-Wedd Mayfly

=== Hamburg ===
(Flugt. Vereins Hamburg)

- Hamburg Störtebecker

=== Handasyde ===
(Handasyde Aircraft Company, United Kingdom) (G.A. Handasyde, F. P. Raynham, & Sydney Camm, – Air Navigation Co, Addlestone, Vhertsey, Surrey)

- Handasyde 1922 glider

=== Handcock ===
(William Arthur Handcock)

- Handcock 1930 glider

=== Handley Page ===
(Frederick Handley Page)

- Handley Page 1909 glider

=== Hänle ===
(Ursula Hänle / Doktor Fiberglas)

- Hänle H-101 Salto
- Hänle H-111 Hippie
- Hänle H-121 Globetrotter

=== Hannover ===
(Hannoversche Waggonfabrik A.G)

- Hannover H 1 Vampyr – built by Hannoversche Waggonfabrik (HaWa) – a.k.a. HaWa Vampyr
- Hannover H 2 Greif – built by Hannoversche Waggonfabrik A.G., Hannover
- Hannover H 3
- Hannover H 4
- Hannover H 5
- Hannover H 6 Pelikan – built by Hannoversche Waggonfabrik A.G., Hannover
- Hannover H 7
- Hannover H 8 Phönix

=== Harbich ===
(Leopold Harbich)

- Harbich Ha-12/ 49 developed from SG-38

=== Harth-Messerschmitt ===
(Friedrich Harth & Willy Messerschmitt)

- Harth S-1 (Friedrich Harth)
- Harth-Messerschmitt S-03
- Harth-Messerschmitt S-04
- Harth-Messerschmitt S-05
- Harth-Messerschmitt S-06
- Harth-Messerschmitt S-07
- Harth-Messerschmitt S-08
- Harth-Messerschmitt S-09

==== Harth-Messerschmitt ====
(1922–25)

- Harth-Messerschmitt S-10
- Harth-Messerschmitt S-11
- Harth-Messerschmitt S-12

=== Hatherleigh ===
- Hatherleigh CAVOK

=== Hatry ===
(Julius Hatry)

- Hatry Wasserratte

=== Haufe ===
(Walter Haufe)

- Haufe HA-G-1 Buggie
- Haufe HA-S-2 Hobby
- Haufe HA-S-3 Hobby
- Haufe Dale Hawk 2 Walter Haufe & Leland Hanselman

=== Haufe ===
(Walter Haufe)

- Haufe Buzzer
- Haufe Buzzer 2
- Haufe Dale Hawk 2

=== Havrda ===
- Havrda SH-2H

=== Hawkridge ===
(Hawkridge Aircraft Ltd.)

- Hawkridge Dagling
- Hawkridge TM-2
- Hawkridge Grunau Baby
- Hawkridge Kittiwake
- Hawkridge Venture

=== HB ===
(HB Aircraft Industries Luftfahrzeug AG)

- HB-23/2400 Hobbyliner
- HB-23/2400 Scanliner

=== Heath ===
- Heath Super Soarer

=== Heinkel ===
(Heinkel Flugzeugwerke / Ernst Heinkel A.G.)

- Heinkel He 162S
- Heinkel Greif II
- Heinkel Speyer

=== Hemminger ===
(lennart Hemminger)

- Hemminger LH-22 Baby-Falk

=== Hendrikson ===
(C.J. Hendrikson)

- Hendrikson 1908 glider

=== Hentzens ===
(F. Hentzens)

- Hentzens Maikäfer

=== Hermanspann ===
(Fred Hermanspann & Art Penz)

- Hermanspann Chinook
- Hermanspann Chinook S

=== Herring ===
(Otto Lilienthal, Octave Chanute & Augustus Moore Herring)

- Herring 1896 glider - Otto Lilienthal, Octave Chanute & Augustus Moore Herring
- Herring Powered Biplane glider - Augustus Moore HERRING
- Herring Triplan 1896 glider - Octave Chanute & Augustus Moore Herring
- Herring-Arnot 1897 glider - Octave Chanute & Augustus Moore Herring

=== Hewitt ===
(V. V. D. Hewitt)

- Hewitt 1909 glider

=== Hick ===
(W. Eddie Hick / Newcastle Gliding Club)

- Hick Merlin

=== Hikari ===
(Fukuda Hikari)

- Fukuda Hikari Ken 2.2

=== Hill ===
( W.T. Geoffrey Hill)

- Hill 1913 glider
- Hill Pterodactyl Mk.1

=== Hill-Kuykendall-Smith ===
(Bob Kuykendall, Steve Smith, and Brad Hill)

- Hill Tetra-15

=== Hinkler ===
(Herbert John Louis "Bert" Hinkler)

- Hinkler 1912 glider

=== Hirth ===
(Wolf Hirth)

- Württemberg (glider)
- Hirth Hi 20 MoSe
- Hirth Hi 21
- Hirth Hi 25 Kria (Wolf Hirth, Hermann Nagele and Richard Eppler)
- Hirth Hi 26 MoSe II
- Hirth-Hütter Goevier III
- Hirth-Wenk-Schneider Moazagotl – (Hirth ordered, Wenk designed, Schneider built)
- Hirth Hi.II

=== HKS ===
(Entwicklungsgemeinschaft Haase-Kenche-Schmetz - Ernst-Günter Haase, Heiz Kensche & Ferdinand B. Schmetz)

- HKS-1 V1 and V2
- HKS-2
- HKS-3

=== HOAC Flugzeugwerk ===
see:Diamond Aircraft

=== Hoekstra ===
(J.K. Hoekstra)

- Hoekstra T-20

=== Hofírkův ===
(Stanislav Hofírkův)

- Hofírkův Milan

=== Hoffmann ===
see:Diamond Aircraft

=== Hofmann ===
(Heinrich Hofmann)

- Hofmann Westpreussen

=== Hofmann ===
(H. Hofmann / Kegel-Flugzeugbau, Kassel)

- Hofmann Schloß Mainberg

=== Høgslund/Traugott-Olsen ===
(Knud Høgslund & Fritz Traugott-Olsen)

- Høgslund/Traugott-Olsen 2G

=== Hohmuth ===
(Otto Hohmuth - Berliner Segelflieger)

- Hohmuth Windhund

=== Holdsworth ===
(H. Holdsworth)

- Holdsworth 1929 glider – Holdsworth, H.
- Holdsworth 1931 glider – Holdsworth, H.

=== Holeka ===
(Rudolf Holeka)

- Holeka Míra 3

=== Holigaus ===
(Klaus & Lanaverre Holigaus)

- Lanaverre SL-2 Janus

=== Hollfelder ===
Obering. Hans Hollfelder

- Hollfelder Greif I – Hans Hollfender
- Hollfelder Greif III – Hans Hollfender
- Hollfelder Greif IV – Hans Hollfender
- Hollfelder Greif V – Hans Hollfender

=== Holmes ===
(Kenneth Holmes)

- Holmes KH-1

=== Holste ===
(Max Holste)

- Holste MH 20-P1
- Holste PE-1

=== Honjo ===
(Kiro Honjo & Asahi Miyahara)

- Honjo K-16 Kamo
- Honjo-Miyahara Mita 2

=== Horten ===
(Walter & Reimar Horten)

- Horten H.I
- Horten H.II
- Horten H.III
- Horten H.IV
- Horten H.V
- Horten H.VI
- Horten H.VII
- Horten H.VIII
- Horten H.IX V1
- Horten H.Xa Piernífero
- Horten H.Xb Piernífero
- Horten H.Xc Piernífero
- Horten H.XII
- Horten H.XIII
- Horten Ho 1B (post war – Argentina)
- Horten Ho 1O (Piernifero)
- Horten XIV Olympia
- Horten XVa
- Horten XVb
- Horten XVc
- Horten XVI Colibri
- Horten Ho 33A
- Horten Ho 33B
- Horten Parabel
- Horten Cóndor Andino – Reimar Horten a.k.a. I.A. 54 Cóndor Andino
- Horten-Schäfer Aachen – designed by Reimar Horten & Schäfer_ built by Christiani Wassertechnik GmbH

=== Hosszú-Tišma ===
(István Hosszú & Vladimir Tišma)

- Hosszú-Tišma 1932 triplane

=== HpH ===
(HPH ltd. Kutná Hora, Czech Republic)

- HpH 304
- HpH 304B
- HpH 304C Wasp
- HpH 304CZ
- HpH 304CZ-17
- HpH 304E Shark
- HpH 304MS Shark
- HpH 304S Shark
- HpH 304SJ Shark
- HpH 304TS Twin Shark

=== Hrbek ===
(Jan Hrbek)

- Hrbek Albatros
- Hrbek Morava I
- Hrbek Přerov

=== Hrisafovic ===
(Nenad Hrisafovic)

- Hrisafovic HS-62 Cirus
- Hrisafovic HS-64

=== Huber-Schmid ===
(Karl Huber & Ernst Schmid)

- Huber-Schmid Zaunkönig

=== Hug ===
(August Hug)

- Hug Dräckspatz II
- Hug Geier
- Hug Gimpel
- Hug Spyr I
- Hug Spyr III
- Hug Spyr III-A
- Hug Spyr IV
- Hug Spyr V
- Hug Spyr Va
- GBMZ Zögling

=== Hulton ===
(E.A.S. Hulton

- Hulton 1969 hang glider

=== Humek ===
- Humek H-2 Metla

=== Hunziker ===
(Raúl Hunziker)

- Hunziker Cimarrón

=== Hutchinson ===
(Vernon Hutchinson)

- Hutchinson HS-127

=== Hütter ===
(Wolfgang Hütter & Ulrich Hütter)

- Hütter Hü 17
- Hütter Hi-21
- Hütter HT-23 Tandemdecker
- Hütter Hü 28
- Hütter H-30
- Hütter H-30TS
- Hütter IMI
- Stekelis-Hütter 17 – Huberts Stekelis
- Vilnis-Hütter 17 – Edvins Vilnis
- Vainode Duja – A Hutter-17 type, based in Vainode. Built by the 17th Glider Aviator Group.
- Scott Hütter 17

=== HWL ===
(Tadeusz Chyliński / Harcerskie Warsztaty Lotnicze (H.W.L.), Warsaw (PO))

- HWL Pegaz
