= List of Japanese gliders =

This is a list of gliders/sailplanes of the world, (this reference lists all gliders with references, where available) Note: Any aircraft can glide for a short time, but gliders are designed to glide for longer.

== Japanese miscellaneous constructors ==
- Cumulus 5 – Japan
- Gannet G-4 Olympos
- Hikari 2.2
- Honjo K-16 Kamo – Honjo, Kiro
- Honjo-Miyahara Mita 2 – Honjo, Kiro & Miyahara, Asahi
- Horikawa H-22 - Hagiwara Glider Co,
- Horikawa H-23 - Hagiwara Glider Co,
- Itoh C-6 – Yamasaki Yoshio
- Kimura HK-1 – Dr. Hidemasa Kimura
- Komadori Primary
- Kyushu 11 – SATO, Hiroshi & Osamu Hiroshi & Naka Maruta – Kyushu University
- Kirigamine K14
- L.A.D. SS-2 – Light Aircraft Development Co. (軽飛行機式 SS-2型上級単座滑空機)
- Mita 3
  - Kirigamine Mita 3 – Kirigamine Glider Manufacturing Co
  - Tainan Mita 3 – Tainan Industry Co.
  - L.A.D. Mita 3 Kai 1 – Light Aircraft Development Co.
- Muramaya Asahi 1
- Nihon N-70 Cygnus – Nihon University (motor glider) (日大式 N-70型「シグナス」動力滑空機)
- Nippi B4
- Nippi NP-100A Albatross – (Nihon Hikoki Kabushiki Kaisha – Japan Aeroplane Manufacturing Co. Ltd.)
- Nippon Tombo
- Onishi OS-G3
- Yokosuka MXY5 Kugisho
- Yokosuka MXY8 (glider version of Mitsubishi J8M)
- Yokosuka Shinryu
- Shindo Cirrus 2
- SM-206
- Takatori SH-1
- Takatori SH-15
- Takatori SH-18
- Teruhiko Eagle – Teruhiko Ukai (霧ケ峰式鷹型)
- Tsuno Amphibie – Tsuno Takishiro – Kyushu University (天風 水陸両用)
