= Haufe =

Haufe may refer to:

- Haufe Akademie, a German company
- Haufe Buzzer 2, a glider designed by Walter Haufe
- Haufe Dale Hawk 2, a glider co-designed by Walter Haufe
- Haufe HA-S-2 Hobby, a glider co-designed by Bruno Haufe
