= 1974 in aviation =

This is a list of aviation-related events from 1974. 1974 had been deemed as "the single worst year in airline history" although this has since been surpassed.

== Events ==
- Japan creates its Aircraft Accident Investigation Commission, responsible for investigation aviation accidents in Japan.
- Spring 1974 – Under an international agreement to clear the Suez Canal of naval mines in the wake of the Yom Kippur War, United States Navy RH-53D Sea Stallion minesweeping helicopters of Helicopter Mine Countermeasures Squadron 12 (HM-12) operating from the amphibious assault ships USS Iwo Jima (LPH-2) and USS Inchon (LPH-12) use Mark 105 hydrofoil minesweeping sleds to sweep 120 square miles of water between Port Said and Suez, Egypt, in Operation Nimbus Star.

=== January ===
- January 1
  - Abu Dhabi, Bahrain, Oman, and Qatar sign the Foundation Treaty, which gives each state a 25 percent ownership stake in Gulf Aviation. Gulf Aviation becomes a holding company, and its airline flight operations are transferred to a new airline branded as Gulf Air, which becomes the flag carrier of the four states.
  - Itavia Flight 897, a Fokker F28 Fellowship 1000 (registration I-TIDE) on final approach to Turin Airport in Turin, Italy, in fog and poor weather, strikes a tree and a building under construction, loses its tail and wings, and crashes inverted into a farm building, killing 38 of the 42 people on board.
- January 3 – A hijacker aboard an Air Jamaica Douglas DC-9-32 bound from Kingston, Jamaica, to Detroit, Michigan, demands to be flown to Miami, Florida. The hijacker is disarmed and arrested at Kingston.
- January 6
  - Diverted from Uzhgorod International Airport in Uzhgorod in the Soviet Union's Ukrainian Soviet Socialist Republic, an Aeroflot Antonov An-24B (registration CCCP-46357) descends through clouds in icing conditions with its de-icing system switched off while on approach to the military air base at Mukachevo. Icing of its control surface causes it to go out of control, and it crashes short of the runway and burns out, killing all 24 people on board.
  - Air East Flight 317, a Beechcraft Model 99A (registration N125AE) on final approach to Johnstown–Cambria County Airport in Johnstown, Pennsylvania, strikes an Instrument Landing System tower and crashes short of the runway, killing 12 of the 17 people on board.
- January 9 – A SATENA Hawker Siddeley HS 748 260 Series 2A (registration FAC-1103) crashes into Gabinete Peak in the Andes, 50 kilometers (31 miles) northwest of Florencia, Colombia, killing all 31 people on board.
- January 10 – A TAM Douglas DC-4 (registration TAM-52) disappears during a domestic flight in Bolivia from Santa Rosa to La Paz with the loss of all 24 people on board.
- January 13 – Dallas/Fort Worth International Airport (DFW) opens in the Dallas–Fort Worth metroplex in Texas; in accordance with agreements establishing the new regional airport, all commercial carriers except Southwest Airlines vacate Dallas Love Field and move to DFW, while nearby Greater Southwest International Airport in Fort Worth is permanently closed.
- January 17 – A Cessnyca Douglas DC-3A-191 (registration HK-1216) goes out of control at its cruising altitude of 11,500 feet (3,500 meters) and crashes inverted near Chigorodó, Colombia, killing all 12 people on board.
- January 21 – A male passenger hijacks an Aeropesca Colombia Vickers 745D Viscount with 52 people on board shortly after it takes off from Pasto, Colombia, for a domestic flight to Popayán, demanding to be flown to Cuba. The airliner makes two refueling stops in Colombia – at Cali and Barranquilla – before proceeding to Havana, Cuba.
- January 24 – A Togolese Air Force Douglas C-47 Skytrain carrying several notable political figures including President of Togo Gnassingbé Eyadéma crashes at an isolated location near the village of Sarakawa in northern Togo. Eyadéma survives, but the French pilot and three passengers die.
- January 26 – The Turkish Airlines Fokker F28-1000 Fellowship Van stalls shortly after takeoff from İzmir Cumaovası Airport in İzmir, Turkey, crashes, and catches fire, killing 66 of the 73 people on board.
- January 30 – The Pan American World Airways Boeing 707-321B Clipper Radiant, operating as Flight 806, crashes during a heavy rainstorm on approach to Pago Pago International Airport in Pago Pago, American Samoa, killing 97 of the 101 people on board and injuring all four survivors.

=== February ===
- February 9 – After a United States Air Force T-39A Sabreliner reports landing gear problems while taking off from Peterson Air Force Base in Colorado Springs, Colorado, a U.S. Air Force Boeing NKC-135 flying from Seattle, to Albuquerque, New Mexico, with a cargo of equipment for observing Comet Kohoutek meets it to conduct an airborne visual inspection of its landing gear at an altitude of 23,000 feet (7,000 meters). The T-39 strikes the NKC-135's tail and crashes near Colorado Springs, killing all seven people aboard. The NKC-135 suffers only minor damage and lands safely at Kirtland Air Force Base in Albuquerque.
- February 17 – Upset at failing in helicopter training and wanting to show his piloting skills, United States Army Private First Class Robert K. Preston steals a U.S. Army UH-1 Iroquois helicopter at Fort Meade, Maryland, and hovers it over the White House in Washington, D.C. before landing on the White House's South Lawn. He later takes off, is pursued by two Maryland State Police helicopters, uses maneuvering to force one of them down, then returns to the White House, where police gunfire induces him to land and surrender.
- February 20 – A hijacker threatens to detonate a bomb aboard an Air Vietnam Douglas C-54A-5-DO Skymaster (registration XV-NUM) carrying 51 other people during a flight in South Vietnam from Qui Nhơn to Da Nang, ordering it to divert to Đồng Hới, North Vietnam. The pilot tells him that the airliner must stop at Đông Hà, North Vietnam, before continuing to Đồng Hới, but instead lands the plane at Huế Airport in Huế, South Vietnam. Realizing after the plane lands that he has been tricked, the hijacker detonates his bomb, blowing a 2-by-3-meter (6.5-by-10-foot) hole in the left side of the fuselage, breaking three windows on the right side, and killing three people on the plane.
- February 22
  - Samuel Byck attempts to hijack Delta Air Lines Flight 523, a Douglas DC-9, before it leaves the gate at Baltimore-Washington International Airport, with a goal of crashing it into the White House in Washington, D.C. to assassinate U.S. President Richard Nixon. He kills two people and wounds a third before himself being killed, all without the plane ever leaving the gate.
  - U.S. Navy Lieutenant (junior grade) Barbara Ann Allen is designated a naval aviator, becoming the first female aviator in the United States Armed Forces.

=== March ===
- March 3
  - The Turkish Airlines McDonnell Douglas DC-10-10 Ankara, operating as Flight 981, crashes into the Ermenonville Forest and the commune of Fontaine-Chaalis, France, after a cargo door blows off, causing damage which cuts control cables. All 346 people on board die. At the time, it is the worst aviation disaster in history, and it remains the deadliest aviation accident in France, the deadliest DC-10 accident, and the deadliest single-plane crash with no survivors.
  - Over Rhodes, two men hijack a British Overseas Airway Corporation (BOAC) Vickers VC-10 (registration G-ASGO) with 110 other people on board as it flies from Beirut, Lebanon, to London. The airliner diverts to Schiphol Airport outside Amsterdam, the Netherlands, where they release the passengers and crew, throw inflammable liquids around the cabin, and set the plane on fire. Security forces apprehend them as they flee the plane.
- March 8 – A Pathet Lao Airlines Antonov An-24 carrying 15 journalists covering a tour by Algeria's Minister of Foreign Affairs of Cambodia, Laos, Vietnam, and Thailand crashes on approach to Hanoi, North Vietnam, killing all 18 people on board.
- March 12 – A hijacker demands ransom money aboard a Japan Air Lines Boeing 747 with 425 people on board as it makes a domestic flight in Japan from Tokyo to Naha, Okinawa. After the airliner arrives at Okinawa's Naha Airport, security forces storm the plane and arrest the hijacker.
- March 13 – Sierra Pacific Airlines Flight 802, a Convair CV-440 (registration N4819C) chartered by Wolper Productions, crashes in darkness into a foothill of the White Mountains 8.3 kilometers (5.2 miles) southeast of Bishop Airport in Bishop, California, shortly after takeoff from the airport, killing all 36 people on board. Among the dead are 31 cast and crew members of the television series Primal Man, including stunt performer Janos Prohaska. A segment the crew had filmed in the Sierra Nevada was recovered from the wreckage and broadcast in Primal Man.
- March 15 – The right landing gear of a Sterling Airways Sud Aviation SE 210 Caravelle 10B3 collapses while it is taxiing at Mehrabad Airport in Tehran, Iran. The airliner slides 90 meters (300 feet) before becoming to rest and its right wing fuel tank ruptures, starting a fire that kills 15 of the 96 people on board.
- March 20 – Two men hijack an East African Airways Fokker F27 Friendship with 33 people on board during a domestic flight in Kenya from Nairobi to Malindi, demanding to be flown to Libya. The airliner diverts to Entebbe, Uganda, where the hijackers surrender.
- March 30 – A young man with a gun and two hostages tries to hijack an empty National Airlines Boeing 727 at Sarasota–Bradenton International Airport in Sarasota County, Florida. He flees after a flight engineer disarms him and the authorities later apprehend him.
- March 31 – British Airways commences operations after BOAC and BEA merge to create the new airline.

=== April ===
- April 2 – The United States Navy retires its last Douglas C-54 Skymaster. Entering service on March 24, 1945, the C-54Q, Bureau number 56501, had flown 2,500,000 nautical miles (4,600,000 kilometres) in almost 15,000 hours of flight time.
- April 4 – Using aviation gasoline contaminated by jet fuel, the engines of a Wenela Air Services Douglas DC-4 (registration A2-ZER) begin overheating as soon as it takes off from Francistown Airport in Francistown, Botswana. The airliner attempts to return to the airport but crash-lands 3.6 kilometers (2.2 miles) short of the runway, strikes some trees, and bursts into flame. The crash and fire kill 78 of the 84 people on board.
- April 18 – During its takeoff roll at London Luton Airport in London, England, Court Line Flight 95, a BAC One-Eleven 518 carrying 91 people, collides with a McAlpine Aviation Piper PA-23 Aztec which has entered the runway without permission. The collision destroys the Aztec, kills its pilot, and injures his passenger, but Flight 95's flight crew manages to abort their takeoff successfully and all aboard the airliner evacuate without injury via evacuation slides.
- April 22 – Flight 812, a Pan American World Airways Boeing 707-321B, crashes in mountainous terrain on approach to Ngurah Rai International Airport in Denpasar, Bali, Indonesia, 42.5 nautical miles (78.7 kilometres) northwest of the airport. All 107 people on board die.
- April 27 – An Aeroflot Ilyushin Il-18V (registration CCCP-75559) experiences a catastrophic failure of its No. 4 engine two-and-a-half minutes after takeoff from Pulkovo Airport in Leningrad in the Soviet Union's Russian Soviet Federated Socialist Republic. It attempts to return to the airport but rolls inverted and crashes 2.5 kilometers (1.6 miles) east of the airport, killing all 109 people on board.
- April 30 – Departing Scholes Field in Galveston, Texas in haste because they are 10 minutes late, the crew of a Metro Airlines Beechcraft Model 99 (registration N853SA) fails to give its passengers a safety briefing and mistakenly leaves the trim stabilizer on standby. They lose control of the aircraft as soon as they take off, and the plane crashes and catches fire; the responding fire truck has no foam extinguisher, hampering firefighting efforts. The crash and fire kill six of the 12 people on board.

=== May ===
- May 2 – Flying at 11,500 feet (3,500 meters) – 1,000 feet (300 meters) below the minimum safe altitude in the area – an Aerotaxis Ecuatorianos Douglas C-47 Skytrain (registration HC-AUC) crashes 7 kilometers (4.3 miles) south of Baños de Agua Santa, Ecuador, after its left wing strikes the stratovolcano Tungurahua and separates from the aircraft. The crash kills 20 of the 25 people on board, and the aircraft's wreckage, at an altitude of 11,200 feet (3,400 meters), is not found until the following day.
- May 10 – Three passengers hijack an Avianca Boeing 727-59 (registration HK-1337) shortly after it takes off from Pereira, Colombia, for a domestic flight to Bogotá. They force the plane to fly to Cali, Colombia, where it spends the night on the tarmac with the hijackers demanding a ransom of 20 million Colombian pesos. As a result of negotiations, they agree to have the plane fly to Bogotá, where they are to receive the money and transportation to Leticia, Colombia, on the border with Brazil. The plane arrives at Bogotá on the morning of May 11, where police officers disguised as mechanics surround the airliner. The hijackers agree to a change of cockpit crews, and when the relief crew boards, the flight engineer attempts to overpower a hijacker holding a stewardess at gunpoint at the rear of the cabin. During the struggle, the stewardess is shot in the leg. A police officer dressed as a mechanic shoots the hijacker to death, and the crew and police then overpower the two surviving hijackers.
- May 23 – An Aeroflot Yakovlev Yak-40 (registration CCCP-87579) crashes on approach to Zhulhyany Airport in Kyiv in the Soviet Union's Ukrainian Soviet Socialist Republic, killing all 29 people on board. Investigators blame the crash on incapacitation of the airliner's crew by carbon monoxide.

=== June ===
- June 4 – Construction of OV-101, the first Space Shuttle, begins. It later will be named Enterprise.
- June 8 – As Aerolíneas TAO Flight 514, a Vickers 785D Viscount (registration HK-1058), descends through 7,000 feet (2,100 meters) on approach to Camilo Daza International Airport at Cúcuta, Colombia, its left tailplane and elevator separate from it due to a metal fatigue fracture. The airliner crashes on Cerro El Retiro, 16 kilometers (9.9 miles) west of the airport, killing all 44 people on board.
- June 11 – Northrop YF-17A 72-01569 becomes the first American fighter aircraft to break the sound barrier in level flight when not in afterburner.
- June 27 – The No. 1, No. 2, and No. 3 engines of a Cambodia Air Commercial Boeing 307 Stratoliner (registration XW-TFR) fail in succession three minutes after takeoff from Battambang Airport in Battambang, Cambodia. The airliner crash-lands in a rice field, losing its right wing when the wing strikes a tree just before touchdown, then slides to a stop, catching fire. The crash kills 19 of the 39 people on board.

=== July ===
- Cuts in American military aid to South Vietnam force austerity measures there, including the storage of 200 Republic of Vietnam Air Force aircraft and the reduction of helicopter lift capacity by 70 percent; shortages, of fuel, ammunition, and spare parts also begin to plague South Vietnamese aviation of all types.
- July 10 – An EgyptAir Tupolev Tu-154 (registration SU-AXO) on a training flight with four Soviet instructors and two EgyptAir pilots aboard crashes near Cairo International Airport in Cairo, Egypt, killing all on board.
- July 15
  - A hijacker commandeers a Japan Air Lines Douglas DC-8 during a domestic flight in Japan from Osaka to Tokyo.
  - A military coup d'état by the Cypriot National Guard and the military junta of Greece that ousts Cypriot President Makarios III prompts the closure of the only commercial airport on Cyprus, Nicosia International Airport.
- July 17 – Greek troops arrive from Greece by air at Nicosia International Airport to support the coup d'état on Cyprus.
- July 18 – Nicosia International Airport reopens to commercial traffic. A chaotic scene ensures there over the next two days as foreign nationals attempt to leave Cyprus.
- July 20
  - The Turkish Air Force supports Operation Atilla, a Turkish invasion of Cyprus, as a war over the island between Turkey and Greece and the Greek Cypriots breaks out. Turkish aircraft join with Turkish Navy ships in sinking a Greek Cypriot torpedo boat which attempts to attack the approaching Turkish naval flotilla, and Turkish aircraft support the amphibious landing.
  - Greek antiaircraft fire shoots down a Turkish Army Dornier Do 28B Skyservant conducting a clandestine mission over Cyprus, killing all on board.
  - The Turkish Air Force bombs Cyprus's only civilian airport, Nicosia International Airport, forcing it to close to commercial traffic permanently. The closure catches all five of Cyprus Airways' airliners – four Hawker Siddeley Tridents and a BAC One-Eleven – on the ground at the airport, where two will be destroyed and the rest stranded until 1977; Cyprus Airways does not resume flight operations until February 1975.
- July 21
  - 28 Turkish Air Force strike aircraft mistakenly attack the Turkish Navy destroyers Kocatepe, Adatepe, and Mareşal Fevzi Çakmak off Paphos, Cyprus, with 750-pound (340 kg) bombs, sinking Kocatepe with the loss of 54 lives and damaging the other two ships.
  - 12 Turkish paratroopers parachute into Cyprus to ambush a convoy carrying the Greek Cypriot commander of the Cypriot Navy, Commander Papayiannis. They wound him in an ambush, but are wiped out by his security detail.
  - In Operation Niki, Greece's Hellenic Air Force attempts a covert airlift of a battalion of Greek commandos from Souda, Crete, to Cyprus using 15 Noratlas aircraft. Greek Cypriot antiaircraft artillery mistakenly fires on the planes at Nicosia International Airport, shooting down one with the loss of four crew members and 29 commandos, and damages two others, but some of the commandos arrive successfully to defend the airport.
- July 22
  - The United States Navy and United States Marine Corps evacuate 500 people from Cyprus.
  - Two Cyprus Airways Hawker Siddeley HS-121 Trident 1E airliners (registration 5B-DAB and 5B-DAE) are destroyed on the ground at Nicosia International Airport during fighting between Greek and Turkish forces. Turkish Air Force rocket fire destroys one of them; the other is damaged beyond economical repair by small arms fire and abandoned.
- July 24 – A 29-year-old male passenger enters the cockpit of an Avianca Boeing 727-24C with 123 people on board shortly after it takes off from Pereira, Colombia, for a domestic flight to Medellín, draws a gun, and demands a US$2 million ransom and the release of a political prisoner. The airliner diverts to Cali, Colombia, and parks at the end of a runway, where police storm it and kill the hijacker. It is the second time the man had hijacked an airliner; in 1969, he had hijacked a plane to Cuba.
- July 28 – A U.S. Air Force SR-71 Blackbird sets two records for non-rocket-powered aircraft, an absolute altitude record of 85,069 feet (25,929 m) and an absolute speed record of 2,193.2 mph (3,529.6 km/h).
- July 29 – Aeroperú, the flag carrier of Peru, makes its first international flight, a Douglas DC-8 flight from Peru to Buenos Aires, Argentina.

=== August ===
- August 6 – Turkish Air Force aircraft support a Turkish offensive at Karavas, Cyprus.
- August 9
  - Three Syrian surface-to-air missiles strike Buffalo 461, a Canadian Armed Forces De Havilland Canada DHC-5 Buffalo assigned to the United Nations Emergency Force in support of peacekeeping operations in Syria. The plane crashes near Ad Dimas, Syria, killing all nine people on board.
  - A Royal Air Force No. 41 Squadron McDonnell Douglas Phantom FGR42 and a Piper Pawnee cropduster aircraft collide over Fordham Fen, Norfolk, England, killing both crew members of the Phantom and the pilot of the Pawnee. It is the first collision between a civil and a military aircraft in the United Kingdom low-flying military training system.
  - American musician Bill Chase and all five other people on board die when a Piper PA-30 Twin Comanche crashes in heavy rain on approach to Jackson Municipal Airport in Jackson, Minnesota.
- August 11 – Flying from Bamako, Mali, to Niamey, Niger, an Air Mali Ilyushin Il-18V (registration TZ-ABE) attempts to divert to Ouagadougou, Upper Volta, due to bad weather at Niamey. The crew makes a navigational error and flies to the wrong town, and the airliner runs out of fuel after circling the town. The crew makes a forced landing at Linonghin, Upper Volta, killing 47 of the 60 people on board.
- August 12 – Avianca Flight 610, a Douglas C-47-DL Skytrain (registration HK-508), becomes lost in rainy weather and crashes into Trujillo Mountain, about 100 kilometers (62 miles) northeast of Cali, Colombia, at an altitude of 9,670 feet (2,950 meters), killing all 27 people on board. The airliner's wreckage is not found until October 31.
- August 14 – A Linea Aeropostal Venezolana Vickers 749 Viscount (registration YV-C-AMX) on approach to Santiago Mariño Caribbean International Airport in Porlamar on Venezuela's Isla Margarita crashes into the Cerro Piache 5 kilometers (3.1 miles) southwest of the airport, hitting the mountain 8 meters (26 feet) below its summit. The crash kills 48 of the 49 people on board immediately; the seriously injured copilot dies on August 31.
- August 14–16 – Turkish Air Force aircraft support the final major Turkish offensive on Cyprus.
- August 16 – A ceasefire ends the war in Cyprus between Greece and Turkey. As part of the ceasefire, a United Nations Buffer Zone is created between Greek and Turkish-occupied portions of Cyprus. Cyprus's only commercial airport, Nicosia International Airport, lies within the Buffer Zone, forcing its abandonment. The largely derelict airport has since served only as a headquarters and helicopter base for the United Nations Peacekeeping Force in Cyprus.
- August 18 – A Zaire Air Force Lockheed C-130H Hercules (registration 9T-TCD) crashes at Kisangani, Zaire, killing all 31 people on board.

=== September ===
- September 1 – The U.S. Air Force SR-71 Blackbird 61-17972, flown by Major James Sullivan (pilot) and Major Noel F, Widdifield (reconnaissance systems officer), crosses the Atlantic Ocean from New York City to London in a world record 1 hour 54 minutes 56 seconds at an average speed of 1,806.96 mph (2,908.02 km/h).
- September 4 – As Eastern Airlines Flight 1160 – a Douglas DC-9 with 101 people on board – lands at Logan International Airport in Boston, Massachusetts, at the end of a flight from New York City, a man enters the cockpit, grabs the captain, and threatens him with a razor blade and a nail; he subsequently strikes the captain on the head and shoulders. After several hours of negotiations, the hijacker surrenders.
- September 7 – On approach in bad weather to Branti Airport in Bandar Lampung, Indonesia, a Garuda Indonesia Airways Fokker F27 Friendship 600 (registration PK-GFJ) strikes a building and crashes, killing 33 of the 36 people on board.
- September 8 – A terrorist bomb detonates in the cargo hold of Trans World Airlines Flight 841, a Boeing 707-331B on a flight from Athens, Greece, to Rome, Italy. The plane crashes into the Ionian Sea, killing all 88 people on board.
- September 11 – In dense fog, Eastern Air Lines Flight 212, a Douglas DC-9-31, crashes while on an instrument approach to Douglas Municipal Airport (now Charlotte/Douglas International Airport) in Charlotte, North Carolina, killing 72 of the 82 people on board. Among the dead are the father and two older brothers of American comedian Stephen Colbert; United States Navy Rear Admiral Charles W. Cummings, acting commandant of the 6th Naval District; three executives of Charleston's The Post and Courier newspaper of Charleston, South Carolina; Wayne Seal, an anchorman at the Sullivan's Island, South Carolina, television station WCIV; and John Merriman, news editor for the CBS Evening News.
- September 13 – The U.S. Air Force SR-71 Blackbird 61-17972, flown by Captain Harold B. "Buck" Adams (pilot) and Major William C. Machorek (reconnaissance systems officer), flies 5,447 miles (8,766 km) from London to Los Angeles in a world record 3 hours 47 minutes 39 seconds at an average speed of 1,435.59 mph (2,310.36 km/h).
- September 15 – A man holding two hand grenades hijacks Air Vietnam Flight 706, a Boeing 727-121C on a flight from Da Nang, South Vietnam, to Saigon, South Vietnam, shortly after takeoff from Da Nang and demands to be flown to Hanoi, North Vietnam. The plane approaches Phan Rang Air Base at Phan Rang, South Vietnam, as if to land, overshoots the base leg, begins a left turn, and crashes, killing all 75 people on board.
- September 18 – After taking off from Ponta Porã International Airport in Ponta Porã, Brazil, a Brazilian Air Force de Havilland Canada C-115 Buffalo attempts to return to the airport due to bad weather but crashes on approach, killing 20 of the 21 people on board. Two Brazilian generals are among several military officials who die in the crash.

=== October ===
- October 7 – A hijacker commandeers a Far Eastern Air Transport Vickers Viscount during a domestic flight in Taiwan from Tainan to Taipei and demands to be flown to the People's Republic of China. The hijacker is taken down.
- October 24 – The U.S. Air Force conducts the world's first successful test launch of an air-launched ballistic missile. The C-5A Galaxy 69-0014 flies from Hill Air Force Base, Utah, to a launch point over the Pacific Ocean off California and rolls an LGM-30B Minuteman I intercontinental ballistic missile with a fueled first stage and inert second and third stages off its cargo ramp at an altitude of 20,000 feet (6,100 meters); the missile falls under stabilizing parachutes to an altitude of 8,000 feet (2,400 meters), where its engines ignite, then rises during a ten-second engine burn to an altitude of 20,000 feet (6,100 meters) before the first stage runs out of fuel as planned, after which the missile falls into the ocean. The test is fully successful.
- October 30 – Panarctic Oils Flight 416, a Lockheed L-188PF Electra (registration CF-PAB), crashes onto an ice sheet on the sea in the Byam Martin Channel 3 kilometers (1.9 miles) south of Rea Point Airfield on Melville Island in Canada's Northwest Territories (now in Nunavut), killing 32 of the 34 people on board.

=== November ===
- November 6 – Three hijackers commandeer an Alia Sud Aviation SE-210 Caravelle during a domestic flight in Jordan from Amman to Aqaba and force it to fly to Benghazi, Libya, where they surrender to the authorities and request political asylum.
- November 20 – Lufthansa Flight 540, a Boeing 747-130, stalls and crashes just after takeoff from Jomo Kenyatta International Airport in Nairobi, Kenya, killing 59 of the 157 people on board. It is the first crash of a Boeing 747.
- November 22 – Firing guns, four male Palestinian terrorists dressed as airport workers rush from the passenger lounge at Dubai International Airport in Dubai, United Arab Emirates, cross the tarmac, shoot a stewardess in the back, wounding her, and board a British Airways Vickers VC-10-1151 (registration G-ASGR) preparing to depart for Calcutta, India. Finding no pilot aboard, they threaten to shoot the passengers if one does not arrive immediately. British Airways captain Jim Futcher volunteers to board the airliner, and the hijackers force him to take off with 27 passengers, eight airport workers who had been cleaning the aircraft, and a crew of 10 on board and order him to fly to Beirut, Lebanon. Finding Beirut International Airport closed and ringed by security forces, they order the VC-10 to refuel at Tripoli, Libya, and then fly to Tunis, Tunisia, where security personnel surround the airliner after it lands. The hijackers demand the release of seven Palestinian prisoners – five held in Cairo, Egypt, and two in the Netherlands – saying that if the prisoners are not released in 24 hours they will begin shooting one hostage every two hours until their demands are met. When the deadline passes, they murder a German passenger and throw his body onto the tarmac. The five prisoners from Cairo are brought to the aircraft, prompting the hijackers to release seven passengers, and the following morning the two prisoners from the Netherlands arrive, leading the hijackers to release everyone else aboard the plane except for Futcher, the copilot, and the flight engineer. The hijackers then threaten to detonate explosives in the cockpit with the three flight crew members if they are not granted political asylum in Tunisia. This is refused, and the four hijackers and seven prisoners finally surrender 84 hours after the hijacking began. Futcher later will receive the Queen's Gallantry Medal for his courage and calm during the incident.
- November 23 – A hijacker commandeers an All Nippon Airways Boeing 737-200 making a domestic flight in Japan from Tokyo to Sapporo. The hijacker is taken down at Sapporo.
- November 29 – A male passenger on CP Air Flight 71 – a Boeing 727 making a domestic flight in Canada from Winnipeg, Manitoba, to Edmonton, Alberta – grabs a flight attendant in the rear galley, threatens her with a knife, and demands to be flown to Cyprus. The airliner diverts to Saskatoon, Saskatchewan. The hijacker surrenders before the plane arrives there; the captain escorts him into the terminal, where he is arrested by the Royal Canadian Mounted Police.

=== December ===
- Rockwell International completes the last T-2 Buckeye. During a 15-year production run, 519 Buckeyes have been manufactured.
- December 1
  - A hijacker commandeers a Swissair Douglas DC-8 flying from Bombay, India, to Karachi, Pakistan, demanding to be flown to the Middle East. The hijacker is taken down at Karachi.
  - While on approach to Washington Dulles International Airport in Dulles, Virginia, Trans World Airways Flight 514, a Boeing 727-231, crashes into Mount Weather in Clarke County, Virginia, killing all 92 people on board and severing the underground main telephone line of the United States Government's Mount Weather Emergency Operations Center, to which the crash brings undesired attention. As a result of the accident, the U.S. Federal Aviation Administration will mandate that a ground proximity warning system be installed on every turbine- and turbojet-engined airplane operated in the United States.
  - Northwest Airlines Flight 6231, a Boeing 727-251 chartered to fly to Buffalo, New York, to pick up the Baltimore Colts National Football League team, stalls and crashes near Haverstraw, New York, after icing disables its pitot tube, causing its flight crew to receive incorrect airspeed readings. There are no passengers aboard, but all three crew members die.
- December 4
  - Two Aeroflot airliners – an Antonov An-2R (registration CCCP-49342) on its initial climb after takeoff and an Antonov An-12B (registration CCCP-12985) – collide over Irkutsk Airport in Irkutsk in the Soviet Union's Russian Soviet Federated Socialist Republic due to an air traffic control error. The An-2R crashes, killing all 13 people on board, and the An-12B crash-lands in the valley of the Ushakovka River.
  - Martinair Flight 138, a McDonnell Douglas DC-8, crashes into a mountain near Maskeliya, Sri Lanka, killing all 191 people on board. All of the airliner's 182 passengers are Indonesian hajj pilgrims on their way to Mecca.
- December 22 – Both engines of Avensa Flight 358, a McDonnell Douglas DC-9-14, shut down five minutes after takeoff from Maturín Airport at Maturín, Venezuela. The flight crew loses control of the airliner, which crashes near Maturín. killing all 77 people on board.
- December 25 – A 31-year-old male passenger hijacks Air India Flight 105 – a Boeing 747-237B with 105 people on board flying from Beirut, Lebanon, to Rome, Italy – and orders the flight crew to continue to Rome. During the airliner's descent, he threatens to crash the plane in Rome, but the crew overpowers him and hands him over to the police after arrival in Rome.
- December 28 – A privately owned Lockheed 18-56-23 Lodestar (registration TG-HTM) crashes immediately after takeoff from El Petén in Guatemala, killing all 21 passengers aboard and the entire crew of three. The dead passengers all are American tourists returning to Guatemala City after visiting Tikal.
- December 29 – Asked to make an unplanned stop at Sibiu, Romania, by a senior local member of the Romanian Communist Party during a flight from Oradea to Bucharest, a TAROM Antonov An-24RV (registration YR-AMD) crashes 22 kilometers (14 miles) south of Sibiu Airport, flying into the Lotru Mountains at an altitude of 1,700 meters (5,600 feet). The crash kills all 33 people on board.

== First flights ==
- Antonov An-30 ("Clank")

=== January ===
- January 9 – WSK-Mielec M-15 SP-1974
- January 20 – General Dynamics YF-16 72-01567, prototype of the F-16 Fighting Falcon ("inadvertent" flight to avoid damage during faulty taxiing run)

=== February ===
- February 2 – General Dynamics YF-16 72-01567, prototype of the F-16 Fighting Falcon (official first flight)
- February 16 – Atlas C4M Kudu (civil prototype)
- February 21 – HTM Skyrider D-HHTF

=== March ===
- March 1 – Sikorsky CH-53E Super Stallion
- March 12 – Fournier RF-6B

=== May ===
- May 10 – Glaser-Dirks DG-100

=== June ===
- June 9 – Northrop YF-17 72-01569
- June 24 – Aérospatiale AS 350 Ecureuil F-WVKH

=== July ===
- July 2 – Issoire Silène
- July 19 – Besneux P70B
- July 22 – Davis DA-5

=== August ===
- August 14 – Panavia MRCA (later Tornado) D-9591
- August 15 – Start + Flug Hippie
- August 17 – Ryan YQM-98 R-Tern
- August 21
  - Hawker-Siddeley Hawk XX154
  - W.A.R. Focke-Wulf 190
- August 22 – Shorts 330

=== September ===
- September 11 – Bell 206L LongRanger N206L
- September 25 – Northrop F-5F Tiger II 73-0889

=== October ===
- October 17 – Sikorsky YUH-60 73-21650
- October 28 – Dassault Super Étendard
- October 31 – IAR-93 RO-001 / J-22 Orao 25001

=== November ===
- November 8 – IA 58 Pucará – first production aircraft
- November 29 – Boeing Vertol YUH-61 73-21656

=== December ===
- December 19 – Grob G102 Astir
- December 20 – Grumman American Cougar
- December 21 – Glasflügel 206
- December 23 – Rockwell B-1 Lancer 74-0158

== Entered service ==
- American Champion Scout
- Avro Vulcan SR.Mk 2, strategic reconnaissance version of the Avro Vulcan, with No. 27 Strategic Reconnaissance Squadron, Royal Air Force
- Sukhoi Su-24 (NATO reporting name "Fencer") with the Soviet Air Force
- Early 1974 – Beechcraft Super King Air Model 200
- January 1974 Ilyushin Il-62M with Aeroflot

=== February ===
- February 20 – Lockheed S-3 Viking with the United States Navy's Antisubmarine Squadron 41 (VS-41) at Naval Air Station North Island, California

=== May ===
- May 23 or 30 – Airbus A300 with Air France

=== September ===
- September 17 – Grumman F-14 Tomcat with U.S. Navy Fighter Squadrons 1 (VF-1) and 2 (VF-2) aboard USS Enterprise (CVN-65)

=== November ===
- November 14 – McDonnell Douglas F-15 Eagle with the United States Air Force's 555th Tactical Fighter Training Squadron at Luke Air Force Base

== Retirements ==
- Antonov An-10 by the Soviet Air Force and Soviet Ministry of Aircraft Production elements

== Deadliest crash ==
The deadliest crash of this year was Turkish Airlines Flight 981, a McDonnell Douglas DC-10 which crashed shortly after takeoff from Paris, France on 3 March, killing all 346 people on board. At the time, the accident was the deadliest in aviation history, more than doubling the previous record. Flight 981 would hold the title until March 1977, the Tenerife airport disaster; and remained the deadliest single-aircraft accident of all time until August 1985, when Japan Air Lines Flight 123 crashed. It still remains one of the deadliest aviation accidents of all time.
