= TN1 =

TN1 or TN-1 may refer to:

- Tainan TN-1, a single seat glider
- Tennessee's 1st congressional district
- Tennessee State Route 1
- TN status, a special immigration status in the United States
- TN1, a postcode district in Tunbridge Wells, England; see TN postcode area
