= H22 =

H22 may refer to:

- H22 engine, an automobile engine from Honda
- British NVC community H22, a type of heath community in the British National Vegetation Classification
- Highway H22 (Ukraine)
- HMS Diamond (H22), a Royal Navy D-class destroyer
- HMS H22, a Royal Navy H-class submarine
- Horikawa H-22, a Japanese trainer glider
