= Tainan TN-1 =

General information
- Type: Single seat glider
- National origin: Japan
- Manufacturer: Tainan Industry Co.
- Designer: Yukio Tanaka
- Number built: Probably only one

History
- First flight: December 1976

The Tainan TN-1, alternatively known by the manufacturer's name Tainan F-5, is a single seat glider built in Japan in the 1970s. There was no series production.

== Design and development ==
Though its construction began in 1974, the Tainan TN-1 is a conservative design both structurally, with little use of composite materials, and aerodynamically, employing well tested Göttingen airfoils from forty years before. Consequently, its performance is modest. It first flew in December 1976.

The TN-1 has high mounted wings of straight tapered, square tipped plan, forward swept by 2° 4' at one quarter-chord and with 3° of dihedral. They are built from spruce and plywood around a single spar, with fabric covering, though the ailerons are plywood skinned. Aluminium Schempp-Hirth airbrakes are fitted.

As with the wings, the construction methods used in the fuselage and empennage of the TN-1 are similar to those in the Tainan Mita 3 two-seater. The primary fuselage structure is formed from steel tubes, with wood stringers to shape the fabric covering. The nose-cone is shaped from glass reinforced plastic. The fin and tailplane, the latter mounted on top of the fuselage, are wooden framed with plywood skins but the control surfaces are fabric covered; the rudder extends down to the keel. All the tail surfaces are straight tapered; there is a trim tab on the starboard elevator. The TN-1 lands on a fixed, unsprung but braked monowheel undercarriage, assisted by a tailskid.

== Operational history ==
Some fifteen months after its first flight, the TN-1 was undergoing its certification trials but no further progress had been reported by 1980.

== Specifications ==
Data from Jane's All the World's Aircraft 1980/81. Performance figures are estimated at maximum take-off weight.

General characteristics

- Crew: One
- Length: 7.64 m (25 ft 1 in)
- Wingspan: 15.50 m (50 ft 10 in)
- Height: 2.20 m (7 ft 3 in) over tail
- Wing area: 15.98 m^{2} (172.0 sq ft)
- Aspect ratio: 15.03
- Airfoil: Göttingen 533 at root, Göttingen 532 at tip
- Empty weight: 250 kg (551 lb)
- Max takeoff weight: 380 kg (838 lb)

Performance

- Maximum speed: 200 km/h (120 mph, 110 kn) in smooth air
- Stall speed: 55 km/h (34 mph, 30 kn)
- g limits: +5/-2.6
- Maximum glide ratio: 26:1 best, at 79 km/h; 43 kn (49 mph)
- Rate of sink: 0.79 m/s (156 ft/min) minimum
- Wing loading: 23.78 kg/m^{2} (4.87 lb/sq ft)
