= Haufe HA-G-1 Buggie =

American glider

HA-G-1 Buggie

General information
- Type: Glider
- National origin: United States
- Designer: Bruno Haufe and Klaus Hill
- Status: Production completed
- Number built: one

History
- First flight: 1967

The Haufe HA-G-1 Buggie is an American high-wing, strut-braced, single-seat, glider that was designed and constructed by Bruno Haufe and Klaus Hill, first flying in 1967.

== Design and development ==
Haufe and Hill intended to design and build a glider in the style of the classic open-cockpit gliders of the 1930s, like the Hütter Hü 17. The resulting design was an all-metal aircraft, with a welded steel tube fuselage, covered in doped aircraft fabric covering. The 38.2 ft (11.6 m) span wing has an 11.2:1 aspect ratio, employs a Clark Y airfoil and mounts spoilers. The landing gear is a fixed monowheel, supplemented by a fixed skid. The prototype was painted a bright yellow.

Only one Buggie was completed; the aircraft was registered with the US Federal Aviation Administration in the Experimental - Amateur-built category.

Haufe and Hill went on to design and built the Haufe HA-S-2 Hobby and the Haufe HA-S-3 Hobby, based on their experiences with the Buggie.

== Operational history ==
In August 2011 the sole example built was still on the FAA registry, although its status was listed as "in question".

== Specifications (Buggie) ==
Data from Soaring

General characteristics

- Crew: one
- Wingspan: 38.2 ft (11.6 m)
- Wing area: 132 sq ft (12.3 m^{2})
- Aspect ratio: 11.2:1
- Airfoil: Clark Y
- Empty weight: 355 lb (161 kg)
- Gross weight: 555 lb (252 kg)

Performance

- Maximum glide ratio: 20:1 at 42 mph (68 km/h)
- Rate of sink: 168 ft/min (0.85 m/s) at 38 mph (61 km/h)
- Wing loading: 4.2 lb/sq ft (21 kg/m^{2})

== See also ==
Related lists

- List of gliders
