= Hirth Hi 21 =

German two-seat glider, 1944

Hi 21

General information
- Type: Two seat side-by-side training glider
- National origin: Germany
- Manufacturer: Wolf Hirth GmbH (Nabern)
- Designer: Wolf Hirth
- Number built: 1

History
- First flight: 4 May 1944

The Hirth Hi 21 was a multi-purpose two seat side-by-side configuration training glider, designed and built in Germany during World War II. It had a retractable undercarriage and wings of variable sweep to accommodate centre of gravity changes. Only one was completed but was heavily used immediately after the end of the war.

== Design and development ==
Design work began on the Hi 21 at the start of 1942 in response to a RLM requirement for a multi-purpose training glider. It was to be capable of providing both basic and advanced flight training, including high performance flying, aerobatics and three-point landings. A retractable undercarriage and side-by-side seating to optimise the instructional process were specified. The majority of two seat gliders have had tandem seating, with the student's seat over the centre of gravity (c.g.) so that its occupation would not affect the trim. Since both occupants of the Hi 24 sat ahead of the wing leading edge for good visibility, this was not an option and it was decided to employ a variable sweep wing, moving its aerodynamic centre to the c.g., rather than shift the c.g. with movable weights.

Apart from the variable sweep, the Hi 21 was a conventional cantilever mid-wing design with a straight tapered wooden wing ending in rounded tips. The inner third of the wing had a plywood covered torsion resisting box section around the leading edge from the single spar; the ply skinned nose extended to the tips and behind the spar the wing was fabric covered. Minimum sweep placed the leading edge normal to the flight line so that the quarter chord sweep was forward; with maximum sweep the trailing edge was normal and the sweep rearwards. This arrangement allowed a variation of the c.g. by about 300 mm (12 in) or 20% of the chord with only a small weight penalty. Adjustment was made with a pull-up, lockable lever placed between the seats. The outer thirds of the trailing edges carried two piece ailerons with their chords increasing outwards. Four segment Schempp-Hirth type airbrakes were mounted inboard of the ailerons and immediately aft of the spar.

The fuselage of the Hi 21 was largely a wooden, ply skinned monocoque but the forward part around the cockpit was steel tube framed to protect its occupants. They sat side-by side ahead of the leading edge under a multi-part glazed canopy which ended, slightly raised above the upper fuselage line, over the wing. The empennage was conventional, with a straight edged tailplane mounted on top of the fuselage and carrying straight edged, rounded tipped and balanced elevators. A small, straight edged fin at the rear of the tailplane carried a balanced, rounded rudder which reached down to the keel and worked within an elevator cut-out.

The Hi 21's retractable undercarriage was unusual for a glider. A pair of wheels, with a track a little wider than the fuselage, were swung up into it around longitudinal axes by a single lever above the pilots' heads. They retracted into a space immediately behind the seats. There was a single, fixed tailwheel.

Several variants were considered: Wolfgang Hütter detailed a simplified, fixed sprung monowheel version, reducing the weight so a shorter span, lower wing area design could still meet the RLM's required glide angles. Karl Schewyer and Ferdinand Schmetz both designed tandem seated competition variants, respectively with a high wing and demountable undercarriage and a low wing, retractable undercarriage. There is no evidence any of these were completed.

== Operational history ==
The Hi 21 was first flown on 4 May 1944. The variable sweep mechanism proved easy to use in flight and was used to test a wide range of c.g. positions. On 7 June 1944 it was test flown by an RLM engineer who, unused to gliders, stalled on landing from about 1 m (3 ft) and severely damaged it. It did not fly again until after the war had ended, when it was repaired in the Nabern factory. Because there were few surviving training gliders in post-war Germany, the Hi 21 was much used and made some 14,000 winch launches in the eighteen months to the end of 1946.

== Specifications ==
Data from Selinger 1978

General characteristics

- Crew: Two
- Length: 8.22 m (27 ft 0 in)
- Wingspan: 19.60 m (64 ft 4 in)
- Wing area: 24.0 m^{2} (258 sq ft)
- Aspect ratio: 16
- Empty weight: 323 kg (712 lb)
- Gross weight: 573 kg (1,263 lb)

Performance

- Maximum glide ratio: 28:1 at 101 km/h (63 mph), measured
- Rate of sink: 0.66 m/s (130 ft/min) minimum
- Wing loading: 23.8 kg/m^{2} (4.9 lb/sq ft)
