= Santa Rosa, Bolivia =

Settlement in Bolivia

Santa Rosa
- Santa Rosa
- Location within Bolivia
- Coordinates: 17.86745°S 64.24711°W
- Country: Bolivia
- Department: Santa Cruz
- Time zone: UTC-4 (BOT)

Santa Rosa is a remote rural village in the Department of Santa Cruz, Bolivia. It lies to the North of the Santa Cruz/Cochabamba highway and on the Southern border of the Amboro National Park.

== Overview ==
It has one shop and a Roman Catholic church. None of the streets are paved. There are no mains services of any description. Communication with the outside world is by a solar powered radio transmitter. The access road is unpaved and subject to avalanche and flooding.

=== Environment ===
The local vegetation includes Siphocampylus tunicatus.

== Photo gallery ==
The photo gallery gives a good idea of the typical rural village in the foothills of the Andes in Bolivia:

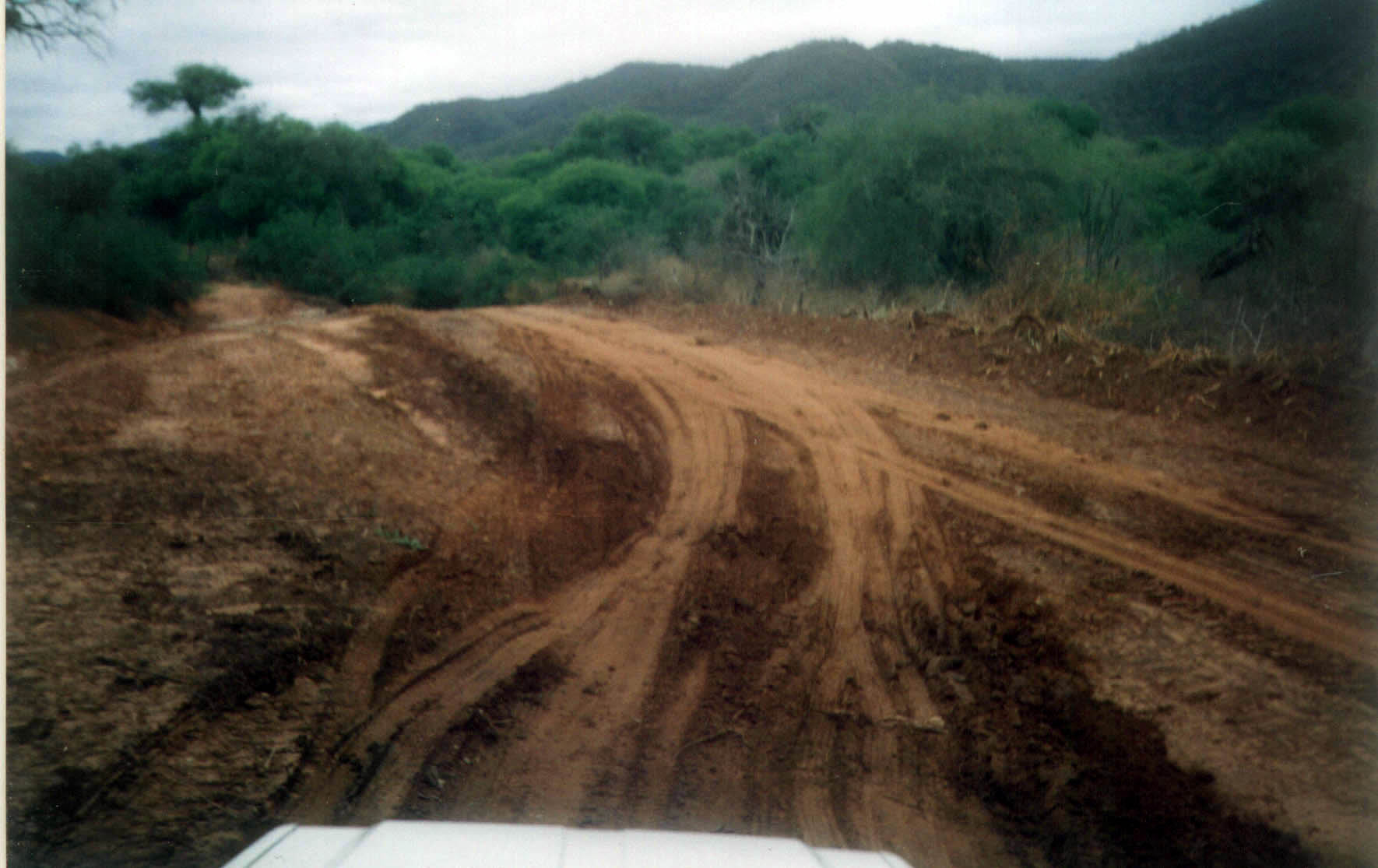
The access road to Santa Rosa.

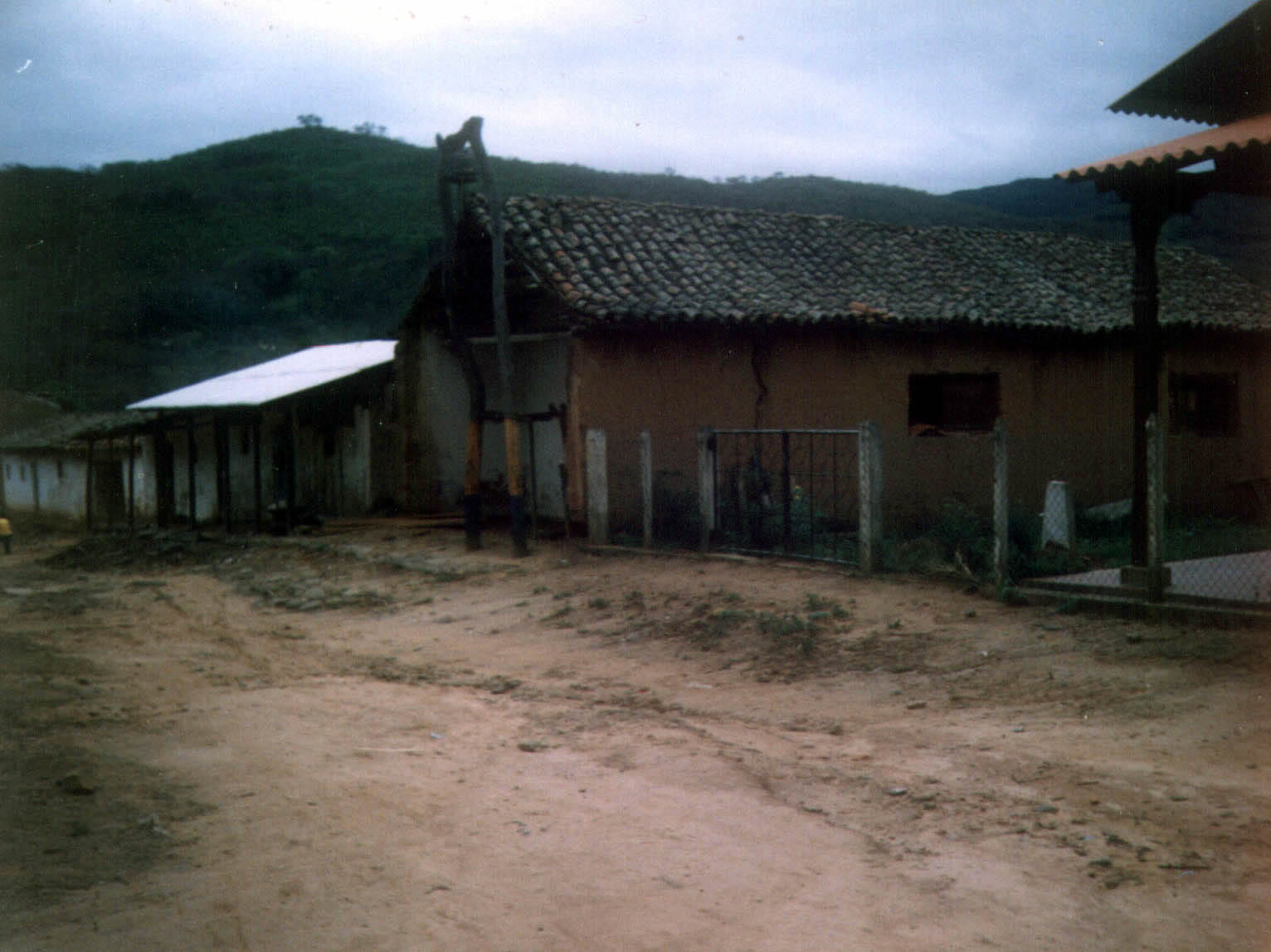
The local Roman Catholic church. (Due for replacement).

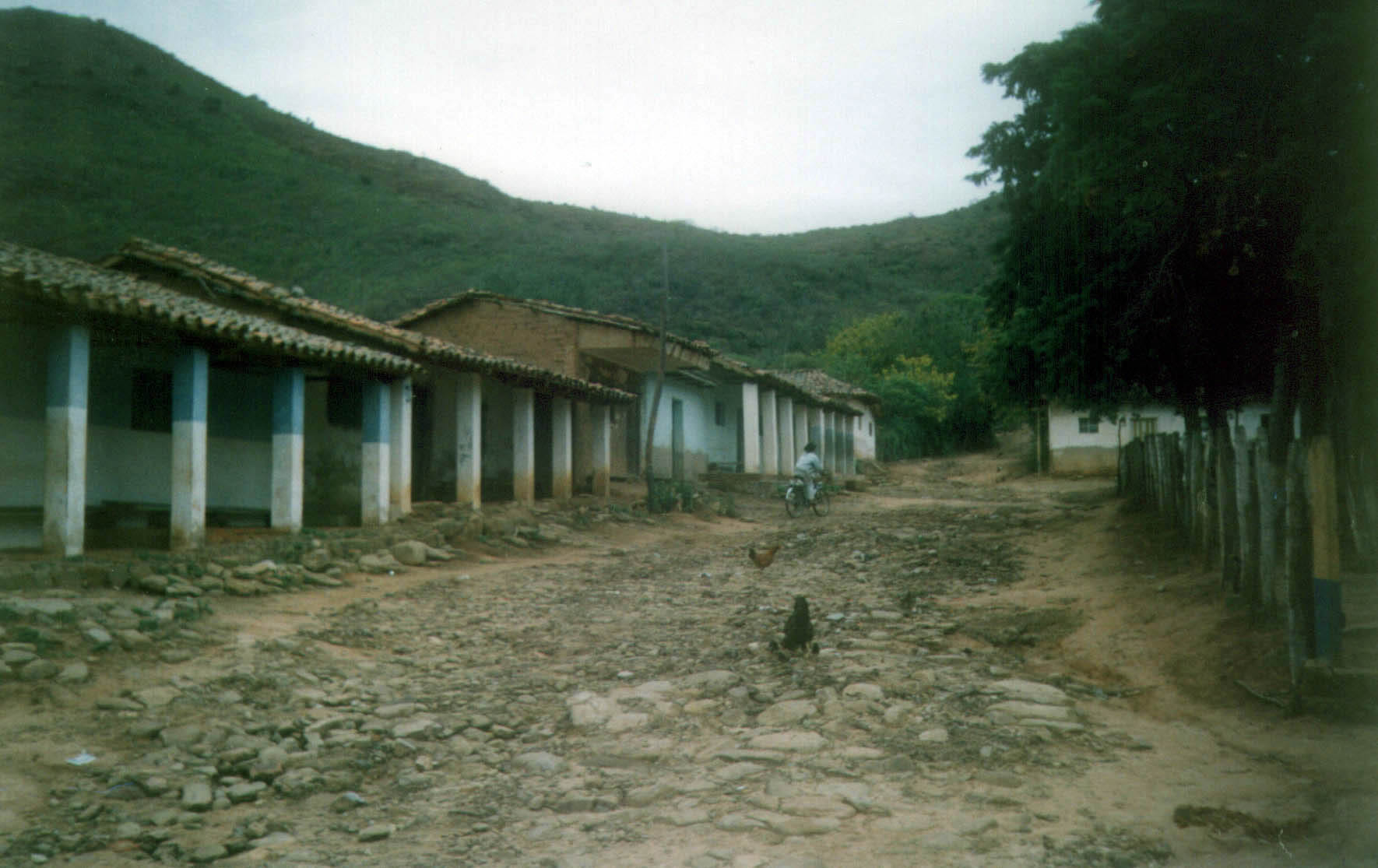
The Plaza, Santa Rosa.

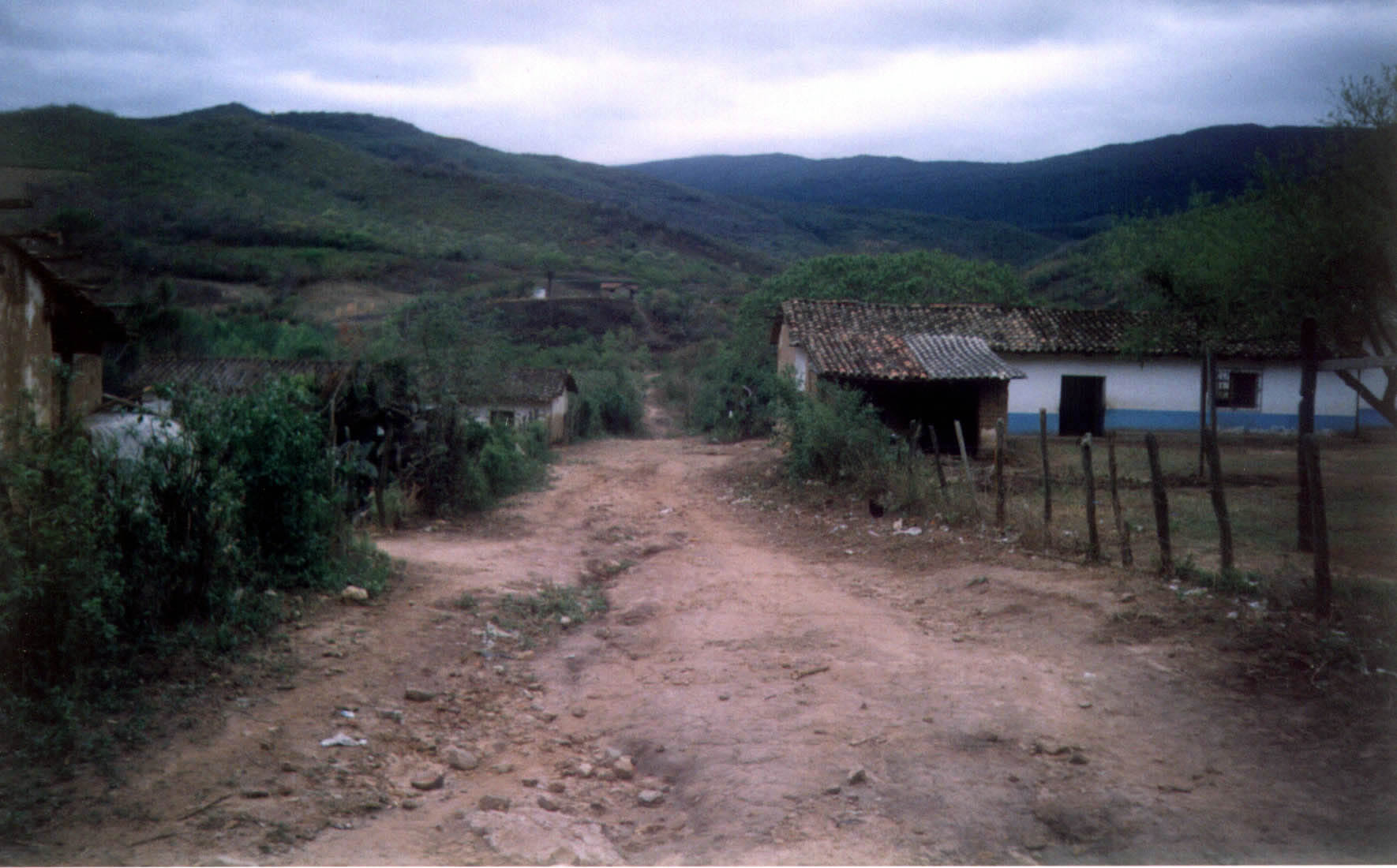
None of the streets are paved in the village centre.

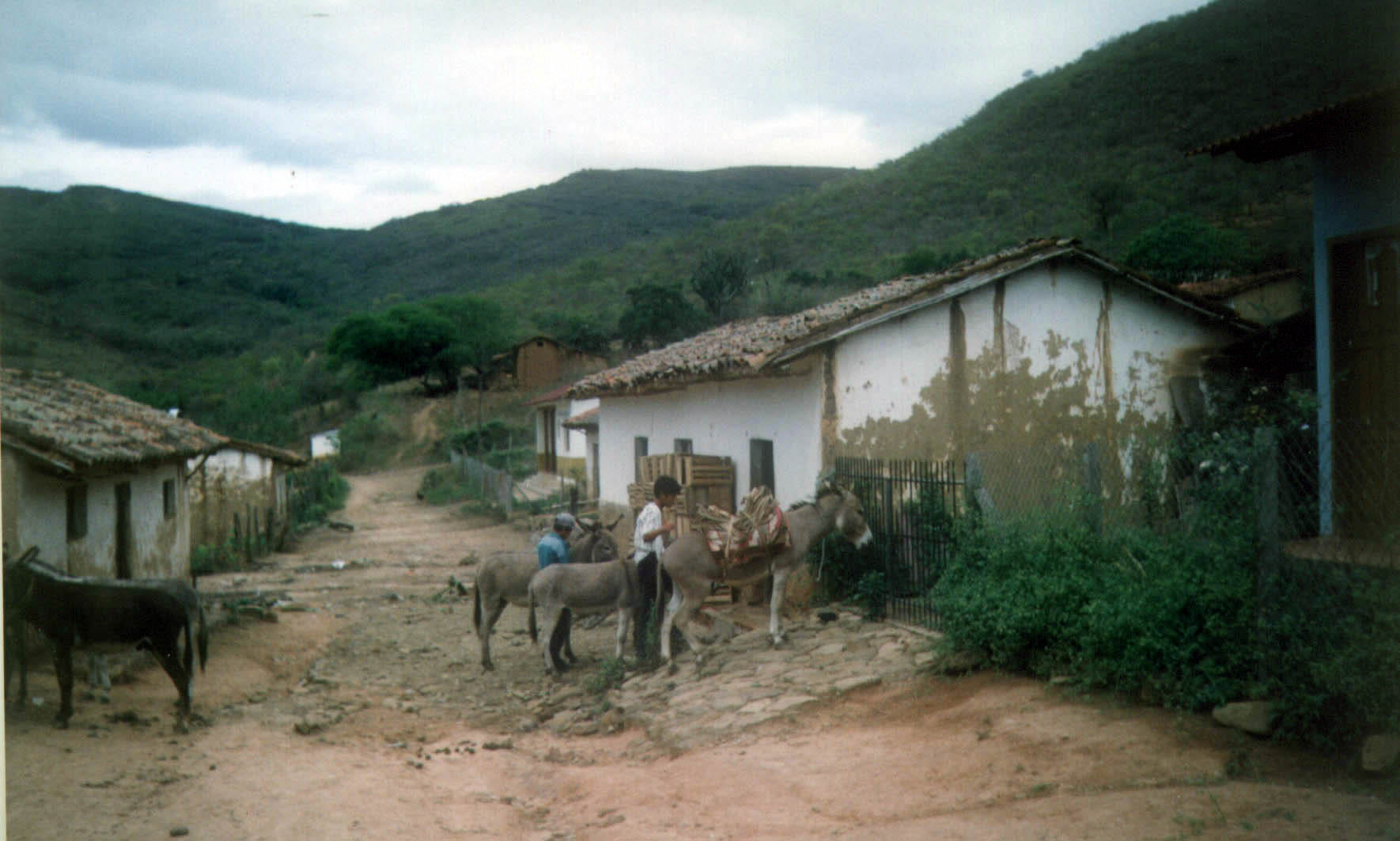
There is no mechanical transport inSanta Rosa.

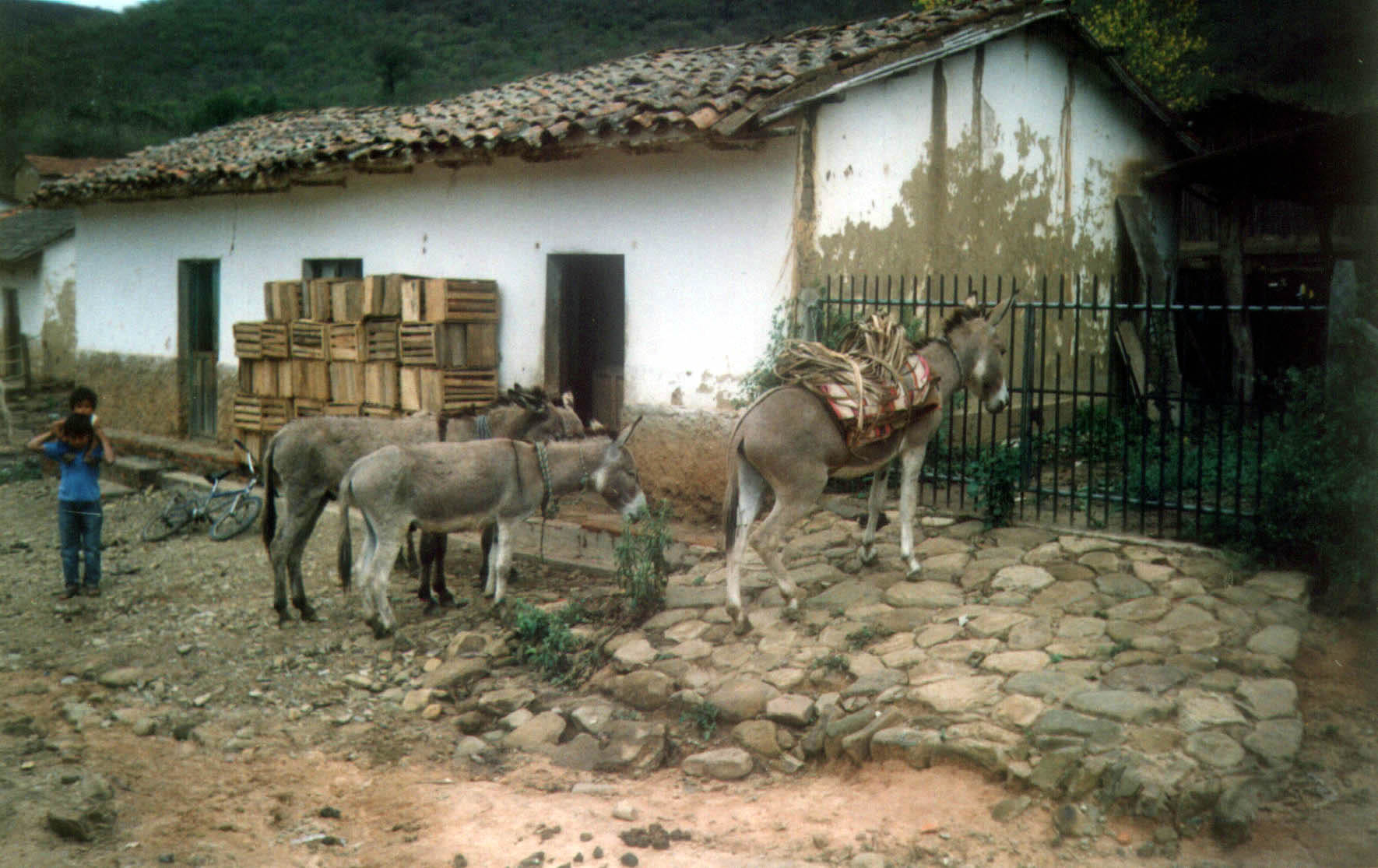
Donkeys deliver goods to the single shop in Santa Rosa.
