= Horikawa H-23 =

Two-seat training glider designed and built in Japan in the 1950

Horikawa H-23B-2

General information
- Type: Two seat trainer glider
- National origin: Japan
- Manufacturer: Hagiwara Kakkuki Seisakusho (Hagiwara Glider Co,)
- Designer: Ikuo Horikawa
- Number built: at least 8

History
- First flight: 10 September 1956

The Horikawa H-23B-2 is a two-seat training glider designed and built in Japan in the 1950s. It was produced in small numbers.

== Design and development ==
The Horikawa H-23B-2 is a more advanced trainer than the same designer's H-22B-3. Ikuo Horikawa was a director of the Hagiwara Glider Company which built both types. It is a high braced wing monoplane, with a pair of V-form struts supporting the wing on both sides. The wing is a two spar structure, covered with a mixture of plywood and fabric. It is tapered and has 1° 20' of dihedral. There are wooden, fabric covered ailerons and spoilers on the upper surface.

The H-23B-2 has a steel tube framed, fabric covered, polygonal section fuselage. Its two-seat tandem cockpit is enclosed, the top of the canopy blending into the wing leading edge. Aft, the fuselage is built up to the trailing edge but tapers away rearward. The tail unit has cantilever, straight edged, fabric covered wooden structured surfaces with the horizontal tail on top of the fuselage and placed well forward of the rudder. The undercarriage is a fixed monowheel, assisted by a rubber sprung skid under the nacelle and a tail skid.

The first flight was made on 10 September 1956; at least eight were produced.

== Specifications ==
Data from Jane's All the World's Aircraft 1966-67 The World's Sailplanes:Die Segelflugzeuge der Welt:Les Planeurs du Monde Volume II

General characteristics

- Crew: Two
- Length: 7.26 m (23 ft 10 in)
- Wingspan: 13.15 m (43 ft 2 in)
- Wing area: 17.2 m^{2} (185 sq ft)
- Aspect ratio: 10.0
- Airfoil: Göttingen 532 at root, Göttingen 676 at tip
- Empty weight: 210 kg (463 lb) equipped
- Gross weight: 380 kg (838 lb)

Performance

- Stall speed: 55 km/h (34 mph, 30 kn)
- Never exceed speed: 150 km/h (93 mph, 81 kn)
- Rough air speed max: 110 km/h (68.4 mph; 59.4 kn)
- Aerotow speed: 110 km/h (68.4 mph; 59.4 kn)
- Winch launch speed: 110 km/h (68.4 mph; 59.4 kn)
- Maximum glide ratio: 18:1 best at 68.5 km/h; 37 kn (42.5 mph)
- Rate of sink: 1.09 m/s (215 ft/min) minimum at 61.9 km/h; 33.4 kn (38.5 mph)
- Wing loading: 22.1 kg/m^{2} (4.5 lb/sq ft)

== See also ==
Related development Horikawa H-22B-3 Aircraft of comparable role, configuration, and era Schleicher Ka 4
