= Hermanspann Chinook =

American glider

Chinook

General information
- Type: Glider
- National origin: United States
- Designer: Fred Hermanspann and Art Penz
- Status: Production completed
- Number built: One

History
- First flight: 1993

The Hermanspann Chinook is an American mid-wing, two-seat, experimental research glider that was designed and constructed by Fred Hermanspann and Art Penz.

== Design and development ==
The Chinook and its improved variant, the Chinook S, have been used to study the effect of rain on airfoils and also stall dynamics.

The aircraft is predominantly made from aluminium with the cockpit area made from fiberglass. Its high aspect ratio wing has a 57 ft (17.4 m) span and employs a Wortmann FX67-K-170/17 airfoil. Glidepath control is via hydraulically operated trailing edge flaps that deflect 80°. The landing gear consists of hydraulically retractable nose and main gear. The vertical stabilizer is highly swept.

The improved Chinook S features an improved wing tip design, system and structure refinements, and a BRS-1200 ballistic parachute.

Only one Chinook was constructed and it was registered with the US Federal Aviation Administration in the Experimental - Amateur-built category.

== Operational history ==
As of March 2015, the Chinook was still registered with the FAA to Hermanspann.

After the conclusion of a number of research projects regarding rain effects, performance measurements, and stall dynamics, the sailplane was being employed extensively through 2015 for cross-country flying, having made a total of five crossings of the Cascade mountains and having set four Washington state soaring records.

== Variants ==
Chinook
Original configuration, first flown in 1993.
Chinook S
Improved configuration, first flown in 1996.

== Specifications (Chinook S) ==
Data from Sailplane Directory

General characteristics

- Crew: one
- Capacity: one passenger
- Wingspan: 57 ft (17 m)
- Wing area: 143 sq ft (13.3 m^{2})
- Aspect ratio: 22.7
- Airfoil: Wortmann FX67-K-170/17
- Empty weight: 630 lb (286 kg)
- Gross weight: 1,050 lb (476 kg)

Performance

- Maximum glide ratio: 40:1 at 61 mph (98 km/h)
- Rate of sink: 144 ft/min (0.73 m/s)
- Wing loading: 7.34 lb/sq ft (35.8 kg/m^{2})

== See also ==
Related lists

- List of gliders
