= Göppingen Gö 4 =

German two-seat glider, 1937

Gö 4
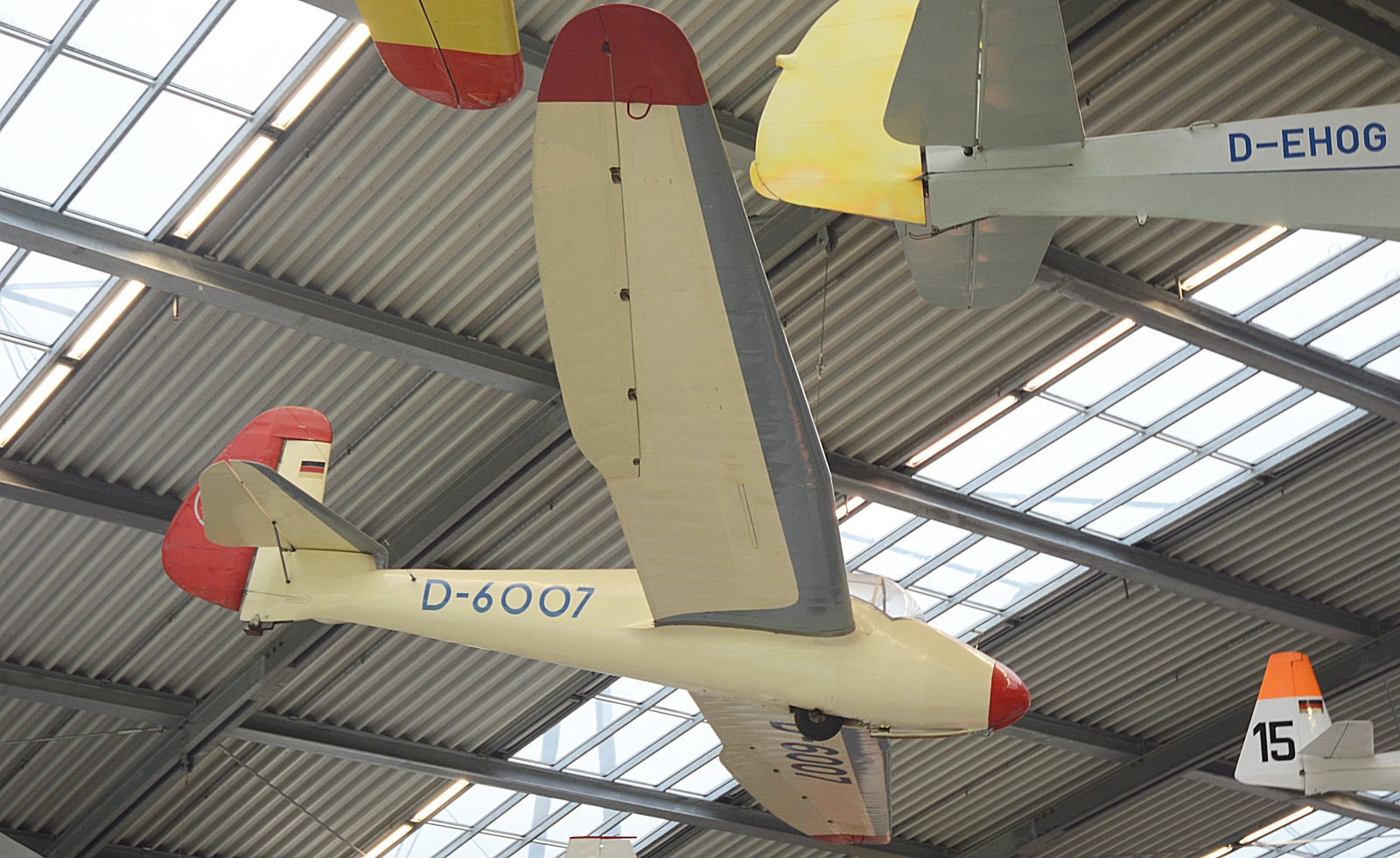

General information
- Type: Training glider
- National origin: Germany
- Manufacturer: Schempp-Hirth
- Designer: Wolf Hirth and Wolfgang Hütter
- Number built: c. 125

History
- First flight: 30 November 1937
- Variant: Hirth Hi-20 MoSe

The Göppingen Gö 4 or Goevier is a German sailplane of the late 1930s used for training pilots. Its most notable features include side-by-side seating and dual controls, making the plane ideal for use as a trainer. It boasted average performance, compared to other gliders of the day, and was advertised as making the process of learning to fly sailplanes easier.

== Design and development ==
The Goevier (or Gövier; Gö 4 read aloud in German) was designed as a modern trainer with side-by-side seating for easy communication between student and tutor, with performance comparable to that of the intermediate single seat trainers of the day such as the Grunau Baby and Göppingen Gö 1 Wolf. Its glide angle of 19:1 was rather better than that of both these aircraft (17:1).

It is a cantilever mid-wing monoplane. The wing has a single spar and a plywood covered D-box nose; aft of the spar the wing is fabric covered. The centre section is of constant chord and the outer panels tapered, with sweep on both edges. Here the trailing edge carries long span, broad chord ailerons with curved edges which extend aft of the centre section trailing edge, giving a roughly elliptical plan.

The side-by-side seat arrangement inevitably makes the front fuselage wider (945 mm; 37.4 in externally) than that of a single or tandem seat aircraft, though as the seats are just ahead of the main spar and the mid-wing placed at shoulder height, the interior opening into the wing roots provides extra working space. These roots were early examples of the use of plastics in gliders, formed from hessian soaked in phenolic resins and shaped in a mould. The cockpit is enclosed with glazing and its roof line runs smoothly into that of the upper fuselage above the wing. The fuselage, plywood covered all over, tapers to the tail where the cross-section is shield shaped. The ply covered tailplane is mounted on a small step above the fuselage; together with the fabric covered elevators the horizontal tail is trapezoidal in plan with rounded tips. The fin and rudder were altered several times during the development of the Goevier, initially with both broad and with the fin extending forward to the leading edge of the tailplane, but on all production models it is narrow and upright, carrying several slightly different rudder designs. From 1941 the rudder was aerodynamically balanced. The Goevier lands on a monowheel undercarriage, with a skid reaching forward from it to the nose and with a small tail skid.

The Goevier V-1 made its first flight on 30 November 1937, piloted by Heinz Kensche. It was often towed by a Klemm Kl 25. Production began at Göppingen the following October.

== Operational history ==
In a flight covering 1–3 June 1939, Josef Füringer and Hofmann flew a Goevier to a new world duration record of 49 h 45 min.

A Goevier was used to develop the now ubiquitous Schempp-Hirth airbrake with its parallel ruler action.

During World War II the Goevier was the standard advanced trainer with both the National Socialist Flyers Corps and the Werrmacht Luft gliding units.

Goeviers have been regular attendees at Veteran Glider meetings in the later part of the last century. In 2010 one Goevier II and four Goevier IIIs remained on the civil registers of European countries, three in Germany and two in the Netherlands.

== Variants ==
Data from The Göppingen Gö 4 (GOEVIER), Der berühmtesten Segelfluzeuge, and Sailplanes 1920-1945

Goevier I
Prototype V-1. Length 6.74 m (22 ft 1 in), span 14.80 m (48 ft 6.7 in). Broad fin and rudder.
Goevier II
Production model before and during World War II. About 100, possibly more, built before February 1941. Another 6 were built by Fokker immediately post-war. Length 7.26 m (23 ft 10 in), span 14.73 m (48 ft 4 in). Narrower fin and rudder. From 1941 with horn-balanced and slightly less rounded rudder on same fin.
Goevier III
(a.k.a. Hirth-Hütter Goevier III) – Dipl.-Ing. Wolf Hirth/Wolfgang Hütter.Post-war production model, prototype V-2. About 20 built. As later Goevier II but length 6.24 m (20 ft 5.6 in).
Hirth Hi-20 MoSe
Powered, self launching version completed in 1941. Retractable propeller.

== Aircraft on display ==
Of the several surviving airframes, the following are on public static display.

- Goevier II: OE-0104, Aviaticum Wiener Neustadt, Austria
- Goevier III: D-6007, Deutsches Museum - Flugwerft Schleissheim, Oberschleissheim, Germany
- Goevier III: D-1084, Deutsches Segelflugmuseum mit Modellflug, Wasserkuppe, Germany

== Specifications (Gö 4 III) ==
Data from Der berühmtesten Segelfluzeuge, and The World's Sailplanes:Die Segelflugzeuge der Welt:Les Planeurs du Monde

General characteristics

- Crew: 2
- Length: 6.24 m (20 ft 6 in)
- Wingspan: 14.73 m (48 ft 4 in)
- Wing area: 19 m^{2} (200 sq ft)
- Aspect ratio: 11.5
- Airfoil: modified Joukowsky
- Empty weight: 242 kg (534 lb)
- Max takeoff weight: 410 kg (904 lb)

Performance

- Maximum speed: 200 km/h (120 mph, 110 kn)
- Never exceed speed: 175 km/h (109 mph, 94 kn)
- Rough air speed max: 110 km/h (68 mph; 59 kn)
- Aerotow speed: 110 km/h (68 mph; 59 kn)
- Winch launch max speed: 80 km/h (50 mph; 43 kn)
- Minimum control speed: 70 km/h (43 mph, 38 kn)
- Rate of sink: 0.90 m/s (177 ft/min) at 60 km/h (37 mph; 32 kn)
- Lift-to-drag: 20:1 at 70 km/h (43 mph; 38 kn)
- Wing loading: 21.6 kg/m^{2} (4.4 lb/sq ft)

== See also ==
Related lists

- List of gliders
