= Nippi NP-100 =

NP-100 Albatross

General information
- Type: Two-seat powered glider
- National origin: Japan
- Manufacturer: Nihon Hikoki Kabushiki Kaisha (Japan Aircraft Manufacturing Co. Ltd)
- Status: On display
- Number built: 1

History
- First flight: 25 December 1975

The Nippi NP-100 Albatross was a Japanese two side-by-side seat motorized glider, powered by a ducted fan rather than the usual propeller. It did not go into production.

== Design and development ==
The Albatross was the first Japanese motorized glider, unusual in being powered by a ducted fan. Design work started in late 1973 and the first flight of the NP-100 prototype was made on 25 December 1975. After a period of testing in 1976 led to several modifications and a change of name to NP-100A. There was another period of testing in the second quarter of 1978 to finalize the configuration and power plant of production aircraft. Despite this, the Albatross was not put into production. The Albatross is put on public display in the Kahaku Hirosawa Aviation Museum, Chikusei, Ibaraki, Japan.

Apart from its power unit, the Albatross was a fairly conventional high-wing monoplane glider. Its wing was an all-metal, single-spar structure and of unswept, straight-tapered plan. There were plain ailerons and two-part flaps; the inboard and outboard sections of the flaps were linked, but the inboard part had greater deflections and could be used as an air brake. The tail surfaces were also all-metal and straight-tapered; the horizontal surfaces were mounted on top of the fuselage.

The fuselage was a standard all-metal semi-monocoque, with the side-by-side seats under a long, low rearward-sliding two-piece canopy, with its rear at the wing leading edge. The Albatross's undercarriage had two main wheels side by side, attached to the fuselage and retracting forward into it. Its tail wheel was steerable via the rudder bar. A modified motorcycle engine, located in the centre of the fuselage, drove a four-blade wooded ducted fan. This drew in air through intakes in the fuselage sides with slatted doors, closed when the engine was off, and exhausted ventrally just behind the trailing edge under the slender rear fuselage.

== Variants ==
NP-100
First version, flown 25 December 1975
NP-100A
Post-1976 modified version, 80 kg (176 lb) heavier.

== Specifications (NP-100) ==
Data from Jane's All the World's Aircraft 1976-77

General characteristics

- Crew: Two
- Length: 8.00 m (26 ft 3 in) tail up
- Wingspan: 18.00 m (59 ft 1 in)
- Height: 2.23 m (7 ft 4 in) over tail
- Wing area: 18.00 m^{2} (193.8 sq ft)
- Aspect ratio: 18.0
- Airfoil: Wortmann FX-67-K-170
- Empty weight: 420 kg (926 lb)
- Max takeoff weight: 600 kg (1,323 lb)
- Fuel capacity: 40 L (8.8 Imp; 10.7 US gal)
- Powerplant: 1 × Kawasaki HZI 748 cc modified three-cylinder motor-cycle engine, 45 kW (60 hp) at 6,000 rpm
- Propellers: 4-bladed, 0.60 m (2 ft 0 in) diameter fan

Performance

- Maximum speed: 160 km/h (99 mph, 86 kn) powered, sea level
- Cruise speed: 90 km/h (56 mph, 49 kn) powered, economical, sea level
- Stall speed: 48.5 km/h (30.1 mph, 26.2 kn) powered
- Range: 200 km (120 mi, 110 nmi) at 110 km/h (68 mph; 59 kn)
- Endurance: 2 h at economical cruising speed, full fuel
- Maximum glide ratio: 30:1 at 90 km/h (56 mph; 48.5 kn) unpowered
- Rate of climb: 2.0 m/s (390 ft/min) powered, maximum at sea level
- Rate of sink: 0.80 m/s (157 ft/min) minimum, at 83 km/h (51.5 mph; 48.5 kn), unpowered
- Wing loading: 33.3 kg/m^{2} (6.8 lb/sq ft) maximum
- Take-off run: 365 m (1,200 ft)
- Take-off to 15 m (50 ft): 600 m (1,960 ft)
- Landing from 15 m (50 ft): 400 m (1,312ft)
