= Hirth Hi 20 MoSe =

German single-seat motor glider

Hi 20 MoSe

General information
- Type: Self-launching glider
- National origin: Germany
- Manufacturer: Wolf Hirth Gmbh, Nabern
- Number built: 1

History
- First flight: 25 October 1941

The Hirth Hi 20 MoSe was a German motor glider designed in the late 1930s. Based on the Göppingen Gö 4 side-by-side seat training glider, it had a foldaway propeller, column-mounted above the fuselage and shaft-driven by a small internal piston engine.

== Design and development ==
The Carden-Baynes Auxiliary or Scud 3 of 1935 was the first motorised glider to use an engine and propeller unit which could be retracted, allowing conventional gliding after self-launching. The Hi 20 MoSe (MoSe was short for Motor-Segler or motor glider) was the first German motor glider of this kind and the first such two seater; it is not known if Hirth was familiar with the earlier aircraft when he began the Hi 20's design in 1937. The Schempp-Hirth factory at Nabern (now Kirchheim/Teck) was busy with the production of the Göppingen Gö 4 and with the outbreak of World War II, the sole prototype was not completed until 1941.

Rather than develop a new aircraft for their foldaway power plant and propeller experiments, it was decided to save on time and money by using the wings and tail of a Göppingen Gö 4. A new, steel framed rather than wooden, fuselage was constructed with very similar length and profile to the original. The propulsion unit, when deployed, consisted of a vertical, faired column carrying a pusher propeller with its hub about 700 mm (2 ft 4 in) above the fuselage, so the tips just cleared the structure. The column was pivoted just inside the fuselage with the engine at its short lower end. Engine and propeller were connected by a shaft within the column; at its top gears turned the drive-shaft through 90° and reduced the output speed by a factor of 2.3. After a powered climb to altitude, the unit was rotated on its pivot so the propeller fitted into a dorsal slot in the fuselage and the engine lay immediately behind the cockpit bulkhead.

A new 19 kW (25 hp) air-cooled four cylinder two stroke engine was developed for the Hi 20 by W. Krautter. Cooling air was moved to the engine inside the fuselage through the propeller-bearing column.

The first flight was made under aero tow in October 1941. More flights were made the following year but then development stopped, as war work took priority.

== Specifications ==
Data from

General characteristics

- Crew: 1
- Length: 6.88 m (22 ft 7 in)
- Wingspan: 14.78 m (48 ft 6 in)
- Wing area: 18.7 m^{2} (201 sq ft)
- Aspect ratio: 11.7
- Empty weight: 280 kg (617 lb)
- Gross weight: 380 kg (838 lb)
- Powerplant: 1 × Krautter four cylinder air-cooled two-stroke, 19 kW (25 hp) at 5,500 rpm
- Propellers: 2-bladed, 1.40 m (4 ft 7 in) diameter geared down 2.3:1

Performance

- Maximum speed: 109 km/h (68 mph, 59 kn)
- Cruise speed: 85 km/h (53 mph, 46 kn)
- Rate of climb: 1.1 m/s (220 ft/min)
- Rate of sink: 0.90 m/s (177 ft/min) minimum, propeller retracted
- Landing speed: 55 km/h; 30 kn (34 mph)

== See also ==
- Volksflugzeug
