= Haufe Dale Hawk 2 =

American glider

Dale Hawk 2
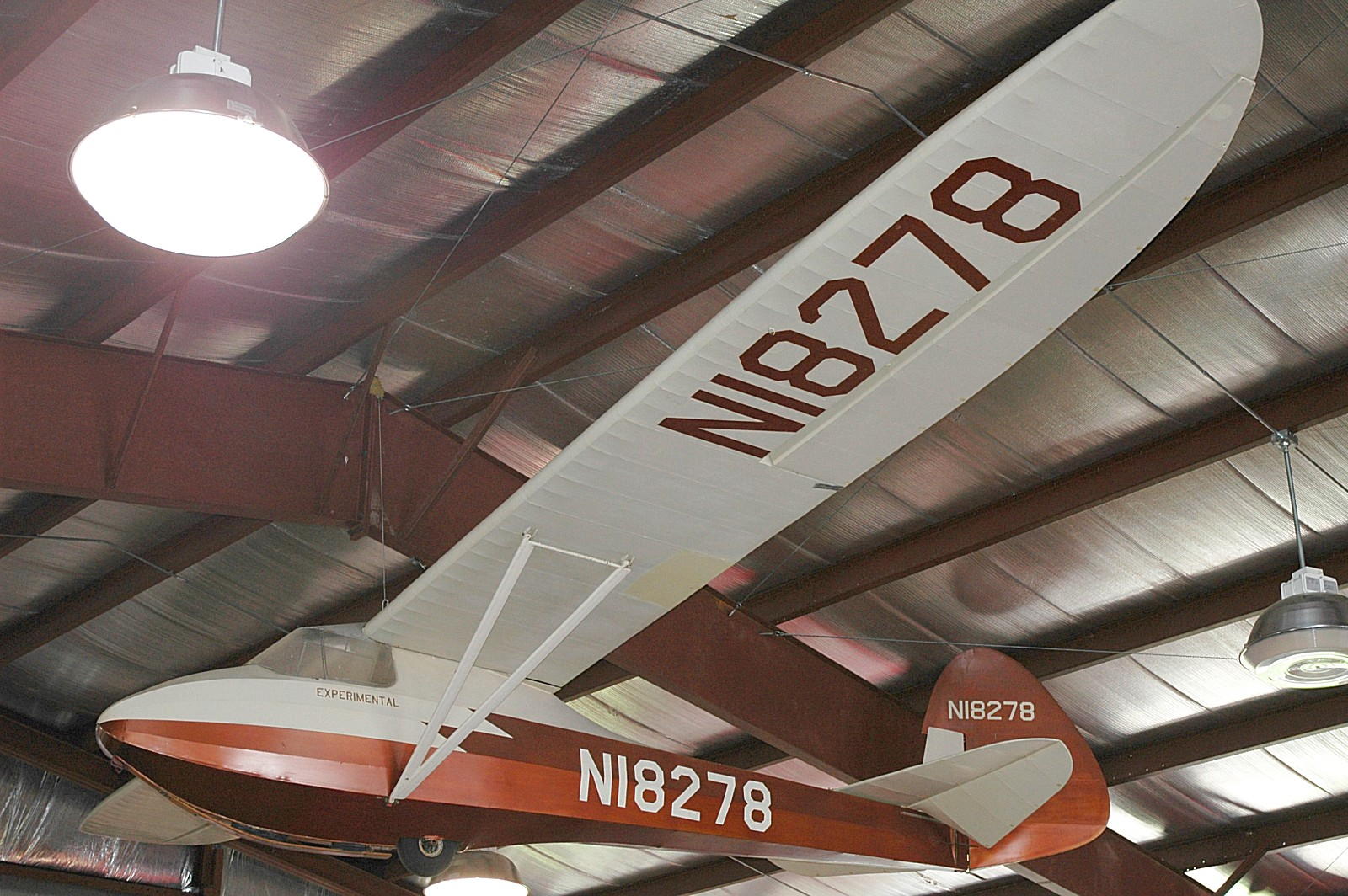

General information
- Type: Glider
- National origin: United States
- Designer: Walter Haufe and Leland Hanselman
- Status: Sole example in the EAA AirVenture Museum
- Number built: One

History
- First flight: 1939

The Haufe Dale Hawk 2 is an American high-wing, strut-braced, single-seat glider that was designed and built by Walter Haufe and Leland Hanselman.

== Design and development ==
The Dale Hawk 2 was named for Hanselman's home town of Dale, Wisconsin.

The aircraft was designed and built in 1939 and is constructed from wood, with doped aircraft fabric covering. The two-spar wing is braced with "V" struts and employs a U.S.A. 35A airfoil. The wing has no spoilers or other glidepath control devices.

== Operational history ==
In 1940 Haufe completed a nine-hour and fifty-minute flight over High Cliff near Neenah, Wisconsin flying the Dale Hawk 2.

Once the United States entered the Second World War at the end of 1941, the aircraft was put in storage, where it suffered some damage. It was purchased by C. M. Van Airsdale in 1954 and restored by him with the assistance of Hanselman, Harry Edwards and C. Vogt. In 1969 Van Airsdale donated it to the EAA AirVenture Museum.

== Aircraft on display ==
- EAA AirVenture Museum - sole example

== Specifications (Dale Hawk 2) ==
Data from Sailplane Directory, Soaring and EAA

General characteristics

- Crew: One
- Wingspan: 40 ft 0 in (12.19 m)
- Wing area: 140 sq ft (13 m^{2})
- Aspect ratio: 12.5:1
- Airfoil: U.S.A. 35A
- Empty weight: 300 lb (136 kg)
- Gross weight: 490 lb (222 kg)

Performance

- Rate of sink: 180 ft/min (0.91 m/s) at 40 mph (64 km/h)
- Wing loading: 3.5 lb/sq ft (17 kg/m^{2})

== See also ==
Related lists

- List of gliders
