= Start + Flug Hippie =

German single-seat glider, 1974

Hippie
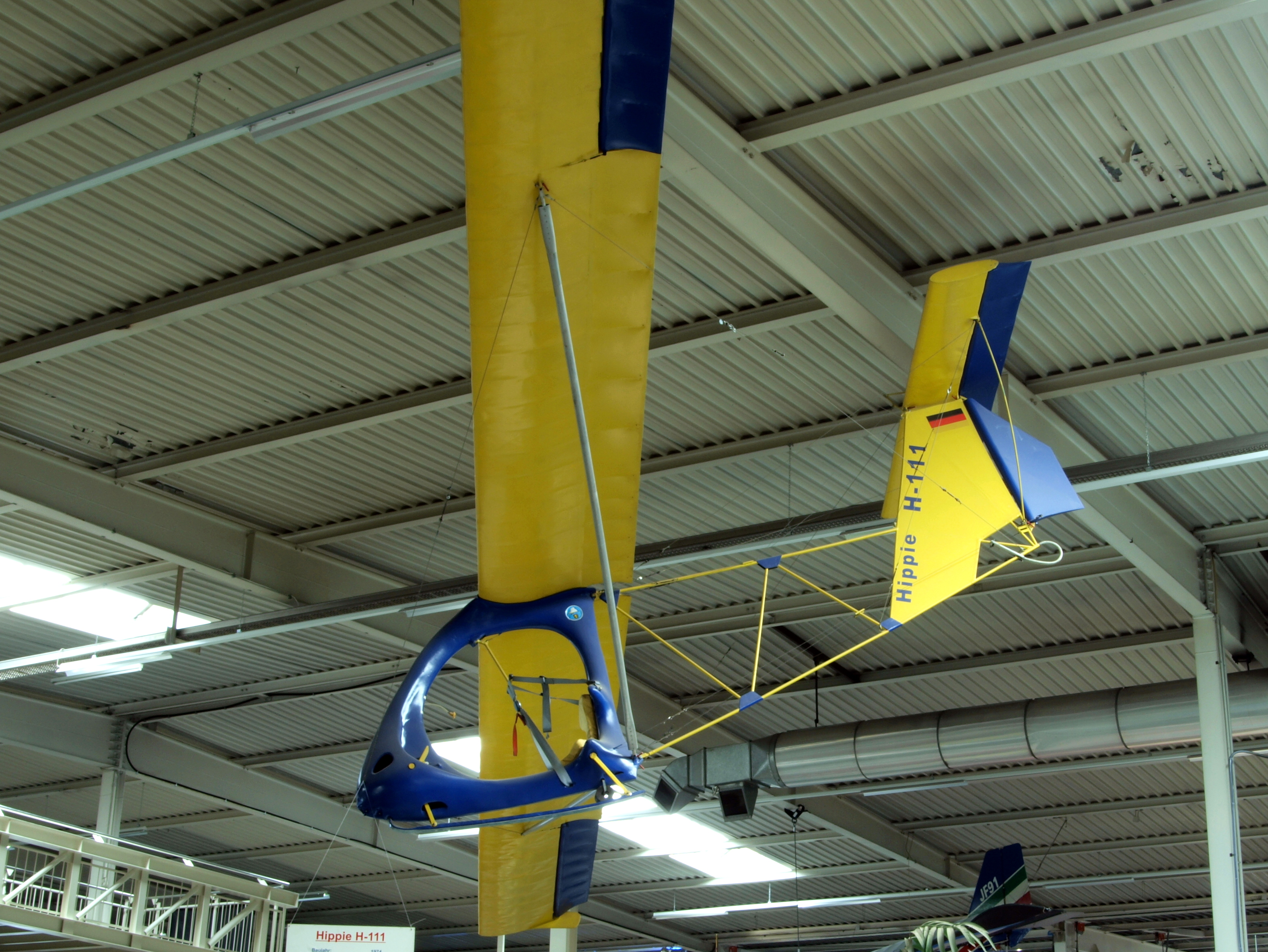

General information
- Type: Single seat ultra-light glider
- National origin: Federal Republic of Germany
- Designer: Ursula Hänle
- Number built: c.35

History
- First flight: 15 August 1974

The Start + Flug H-111 Hippie, later retailed as the Hänle Hippie is a basic single seat glider, its weight kept low with the use of modern composite materials. It can be foot launched or by other methods. It was designed and built in Germany in the 1970s.

== Design and development ==
The Hippie was designed by Ursula Hänle to be a very simple, light weight glider with an open frame fuselage reminiscent of 1930s single seat primary training aircraft but built from composite materials and with a more modern wing section. Empty, it weighs less than 50 kg (110 lb). It can be launched by winch, by aero tow or by foot. Foot launching on a 1 in 3 slope requires a headwind of just over 4 m/s (just under 9 mph). A dismantled Hippie fits into a 5 m × 1.10 m × 0.66 m (16 ft 5 × 3 ft 7 in × 2 ft 0 in) container.

The wings of the Hippie are high set with noticeable positive dihedral. They are unswept, with constant chord and have small end-plate fairings at the tips. They are built from glass and carbon reinforced plastics, with plastic skins and braced to the lower fuselage with a single strut on each side. Glass and carbon reinforced plastics are used throughout the Hippie: the forward fuselage is a glass-fibre ring, mounted under the wing, which incorporates a windscreen, the pilot's seat and a small keel underneath which acts as the main undercarriage. Aft, there is an open, tapering Warren girder which carries the fabric-covered tail unit. The leading edge of the fin is formed from an extended diagonal fuselage member, with a vertical piece behind to support the rudder. The Hippie has a T-tail with a wire braced tailplane on top of the fin. There is a small loop tailskid at the bottom of the rudder post.

A later version appeared with revised construction; it had wings built around a honeycomb structure, an extended, aluminium alloy tube rear fuselage and increases in rudder area and seating space.

== Operational history ==
Some thirty-five Hippies were built and operated in Germany and five other countries. One was flying near Adelaide, Australia at least until quite recently. No Hippies remained on the European civil registers in 2010.

== Aircraft on display ==
Sinsheim Auto & Technik Museum: H-111 Hippie

== Specifications ==
Data from Hardy 1982

General characteristics

- Crew: One
- Length: 5.72 m (18 ft 9 in)
- Wingspan: 10.00 m (32 ft 10 in)
- Height: 1.40 m (4 ft 7 in)
- Wing area: 9.00 m^{2} (96.9 sq ft)
- Aspect ratio: 11.1
- Airfoil: Wortmann
- Empty weight: 50 kg (110 lb)
- Max takeoff weight: 135 kg (298 lb)

Performance

- Maximum speed: 60 km/h (37 mph, 32 kn)
- Maximum glide ratio: maximum 12:1
