= L.A.D. Mita 3 =

Mita 3

General information
- Type: Two seat trainer glider
- National origin: Japan
- Manufacturer: Kirigamine Glider Manufacturing Co/ Light Aircraft Development Co. (LAD)/ Tainan Industry Co.
- Designer: Asahi Miyahara
- Number built: 37 by January 1979

History
- First flight: 1962

The Kirigamine Mita is a training glider, seating two in tandem, designed in Japan in the early 1960s. A modified version, first flown in 1966, was produced in modest numbers.

== Design and development ==
The original Mita 3 was designed and built by the Kirigamine Glider Manufacturing Co and flown in 1962. It was then developed and produced in an improved version, the kai 1, by the Light Aircraft Development Co. (L.A.D.) with production later taken over in turn by the Tainan Industry Co., so that the aircraft is also known as the Tainan Mita 3. The kai 1 first flew in 1966.

The Mita 3 is of mixed steel and wood construction, largely covered with plywood and fabric. The shoulder wing is in three pieces, with an unswept, straight leading edge and a centre panel of constant chord; the outer panels are straight tapered. All panels are built around plywood covered single box spars. The Mita designer, Asahi Miyahara, chose a NACA series 6 airfoil, popular at the time, which aimed to optimise laminar flow. The ailerons and the rear wing surfaces are fabric covered and the outer panels are demountable for transportation, the joints covered with aluminium fairings. The wing tips are glass-plastic mouldings. Schempp-Hirth airbrakes, located near mid-chord at the ends of the centre section, extend both above and below the wings.

The fuselage of the Mita 3 is steel framed with wooden stringers, polygonal in cross-section and fabric covered apart from a glass reinforced plastic (GRP) nose cone and a short GRP dorsal fairing behind the cockpit. The rear of the single piece, starboard side hinged canopy rises upwards above the rear fuselage line, allowing the instructor to be placed above the pupil pilot in the front seat, with an upper and two small side transparencies to assist his view. The fuselage tapers gently rearwards to the straight tapered tail surfaces; the tailplane is mounted on the top of the fuselage and is, like the wing, a ply box structure with fabric covering aft and carrying fabric covered elevators with a cut out for rudder movement. The fin is similarly plywood skinned, with a small GRP fillet; the rudder, which extends to the keel, is fabric covered, mass balanced and has a GRP tip. The Mita 3 lands on a fixed, rubber sprung monowheel undercarriage and a fixed tailskid.

== Operational history ==
37 Mita 3 ka 1 aircraft had been produced by the start of 1979.

== Variants ==
Mita 3
Original aircraft designed and built by Kiriganine in 1962

Mita 3 kai 1
Improved version by L.A.D. and flown in 1966, including a larger cockpit with a raised rear instructor's seat. Produced first by L.A.D. then Tainan.

== Aircraft on display ==
- Kakamigahara Aerospace Museum – L.A.D.Mita 3 ka 1 JA2091

== Specifications (kia-1) ==
Data from (most dimensions, airfoil and weights) Sailplanes 1965-2000; (height and performance) Gliders and Sailplanes of the World

General characteristics

- Crew: Two
- Length: 7.77 m (25 ft 6 in)
- Wingspan: 16.00 m (52 ft 6 in)
- Height: 1.283 m (4 ft 2.5 in)
- Wing area: 15.87 m^{2} (170.8 sq ft)
- Aspect ratio: 16.13
- Airfoil: NACA 63_{3}618
- Empty weight: 300 kg (661 lb)
- Gross weight: 450 kg (992 lb)
- Maximum speed: 190 km/h (118 mph, 103 kn) in smooth air
- Maximum glide ratio: 30:1 at 82 km/h (51 mph; 44 kn)
- Rate of sink: 0.72 m/s (142 ft/min) minimum at 76 km/h (47 mph; 41 kn)
- Wing loading: 28.4 kg/m^{2} (5.8 lb/sq ft)
