= Haufe HA-S-2 Hobby =

American glider

HA-S-2 Hobby

General information
- Type: Glider
- National origin: United States
- Designer: Bruno Haufe and Klaus Hill
- Status: Plans not currently available
- Number built: two

History
- Introduction date: 1967
- First flight: 1967

The Haufe HA-S-2 Hobby is an American, high-wing, single seat glider that was designed by Bruno Haufe and Klaus Hill for amateur building and first flown in 1967.

== Design and development ==
The HA-S-2 all-metal sailplane design was built as a follow-on to the previous Haufe-Hill collaboration, the Haufe HA-G-1 Buggie all-metal utility glider. The HA-S-2 took five years to design and build and first flew in Utah in 1967. The aircraft features a fixed monowheel landing gear, spoilers and is registered as an Experimental - amateur-built.

After the prototype HA-S-2 was finished a second example was completed from plans by Russell Worrell of Morgan, Utah in 1971. This version has a cockpit that is 2 in (5.1 cm) wider and has in increased wingspan of 43 ft (13.1 m), 1.8 ft (0.5 m) greater than the original. The second example was designated as the HA-S-3 Hobby and is also registered as an Experimental - amateur-built.

== Variants ==
HA-S-2
Original model with a 41.23 ft (12.6 m) wingspan. One built.
HA-S-3
Second model built with a 2 in (5.1 cm) wider cockpit and a 43 ft (13.1 m) wingspan. One built.

== Specifications (HA-S-2) ==
Data from Soaring

General characteristics

- Crew: one
- Wingspan: 41 ft 2.4 in (12.558 m)
- Wing area: 100 sq ft (9.3 m^{2})
- Aspect ratio: 17:1
- Airfoil: Clark Y
- Empty weight: 340 lb (154 kg)
- Gross weight: 540 lb (245 kg)

Performance

- Maximum glide ratio: 28:1 at 46 mph (74 km/h)
- Rate of sink: 174 ft/min (0.88 m/s) at 40 mph (64 km/h)
- Wing loading: 5.4 lb/sq ft (26 kg/m^{2})

== See also ==
- List of gliders
