= Horikawa H-22 =

Horikawa H-22B-3
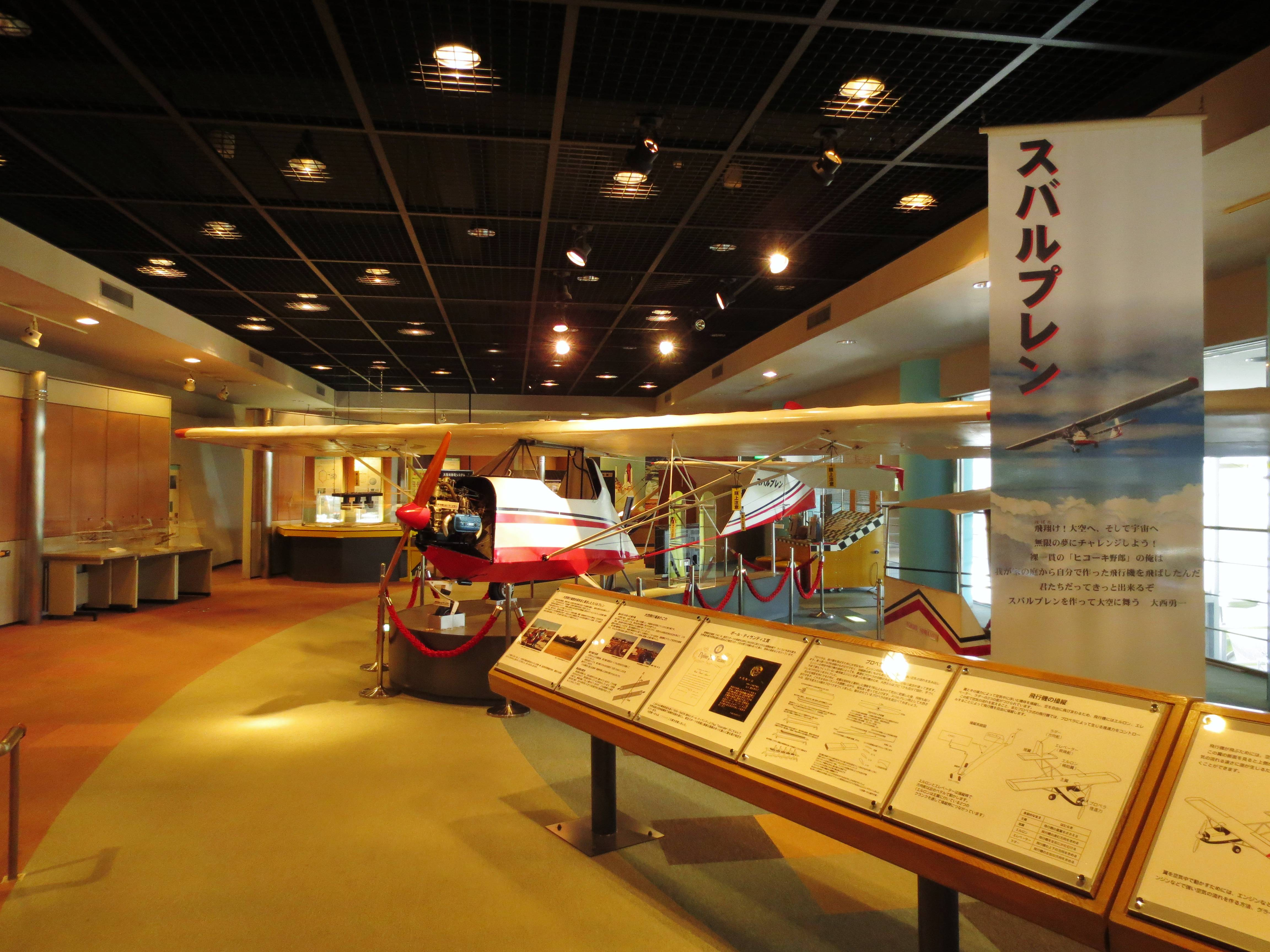

General information
- Type: Two seat Primary trainer glider
- National origin: Japan
- Manufacturer: Hagiwara Kakkuki Seisakusho (Hagiwara Glider Co,)
- Designer: Ikuo Horikawa
- Number built: at least 30

History
- First flight: August 1953

The Horikawa H-22B-3 is a simple, open frame, two seat primary trainer glider designed and built in Japan in the 1950s.

== Design and development ==
The H-22B-3 was one of the first gliders to be built in Japan after World War II. Its open fuselage structure and overall simplicity was similar to the pre-war Zögling and its descendants but it was larger and had tandem seating. Many deaths and injuries have been ascribed to the pre-war practice of using single seat primary gliders. The H-22B-3's designer, Ikuo Horikawa, was a director of the Hagiwara Glider Company which built it.

The H-22B-3 has a simple wooden two spar wing of constant chord and dihedral 1° 20', covered with fabric. The wing is high mounted, braced to the lower fuselage by a pair of V-form struts on both sides. Upper surface spoilers are fitted.

The fuselage of the H-22B-3 is constructed from steel tube with a fabric covered nacelle extending forward from about the wing trailing edge. This contains the two open, under wing, tandem cockpits. Aft, the uncovered fuselage has two members, one directly above the other and interconnected by a series of diagonal stiffening tubes. The lower longitudinal member slopes slightly upwards, tapering the fuselage in profile. This tail boom is stiffened with bracing wires to the wing spars. The rearmost section of the fuselage can be fabric covered but there is no other fixed fin. The tail unit is wooden with fabric covering and both vertical and horizontal surfaces are roughly rectangular. The tailplane is attached to the upper fuselage beam far enough forward for the rudder, which extends to the keel, to need only a small cut-out in the elevators. The H-22B-3 lands on a fixed monowheel, assisted by a rubber sprung skid under the nacelle and a tail bumper.

The H-22B-3 was flown for the first time in August 1953. By 1966 at least 30 had been produced, though production may have ended earlier.

== Specifications ==
Data from Jane's All the World's Aircraft 1966-67 The World's Sailplanes:Die Segelflugzeuge der Welt:Les Planeurs du Monde Volume II

General characteristics

- Crew: Two
- Length: 7.0 m (23 ft 0 in)
- Wingspan: 12.21 m (40 ft 1 in)
- Wing area: 16.8 m^{2} (181 sq ft)
- Aspect ratio: 8.87
- Airfoil: Göttingen 532 (modified)
- Empty weight: 170 kg (375 lb) equipped
- Gross weight: 300 kg (661 lb)

Performance

- Stall speed: 48.5 km/h (30.1 mph, 26.2 kn)
- Never exceed speed: 120 km/h (75 mph, 65 kn) in smooth air
- Rough air speed max: 100 km/h (62.1 mph; 54.0 kn)
- Winch launch speed: 90 km/h (55.9 mph; 48.6 kn)
- Maximum glide ratio: 14.2 best at 66.8 km/h; 36 kn (41.2 mph)
- Rate of sink: 1.16 m/s (228 ft/min) minimum at 54.4 km/h; 29.3 kn (34 mph)
- Wing loading: 17.8 kg/m^{2} (3.6 lb/sq ft)
