= Airframe =

Mechanical structure of an aircraft

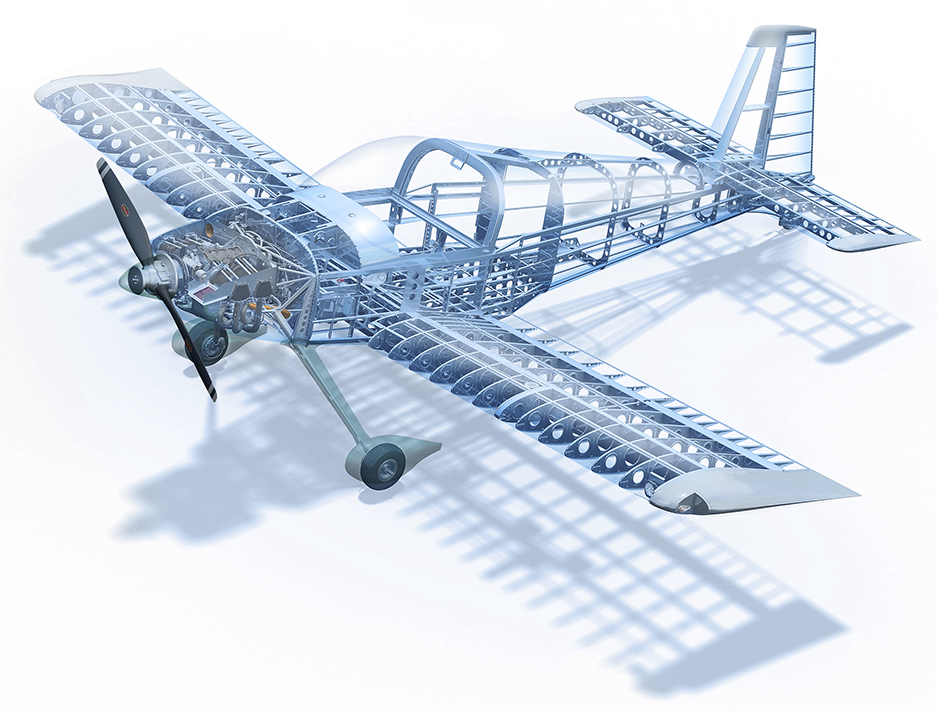
Van's RV-14 cutaway showing its airframe

The mechanical structure of an aircraft is known as the airframe. This structure is typically considered to include the fuselage, undercarriage, empennage and wings, and excludes the propulsion system.

The airframe is distinct from the individual aerostructures from which it is assembled. The airframe is the complete structure of the aircraft as designed; an aerostructure is one of its manufactured sections, such as a fuselage barrel, a wing box, a tail surface or a nacelle, that is produced separately, often by a specialist supplier, and joined to the others on the final assembly line. A modern airliner's airframe may be made up of dozens of aerostructures built in several countries.

Airframe design is a field of aerospace engineering that combines aerodynamics, materials technology and manufacturing methods with a focus on weight, strength and aerodynamic drag, as well as reliability and cost.

== History ==
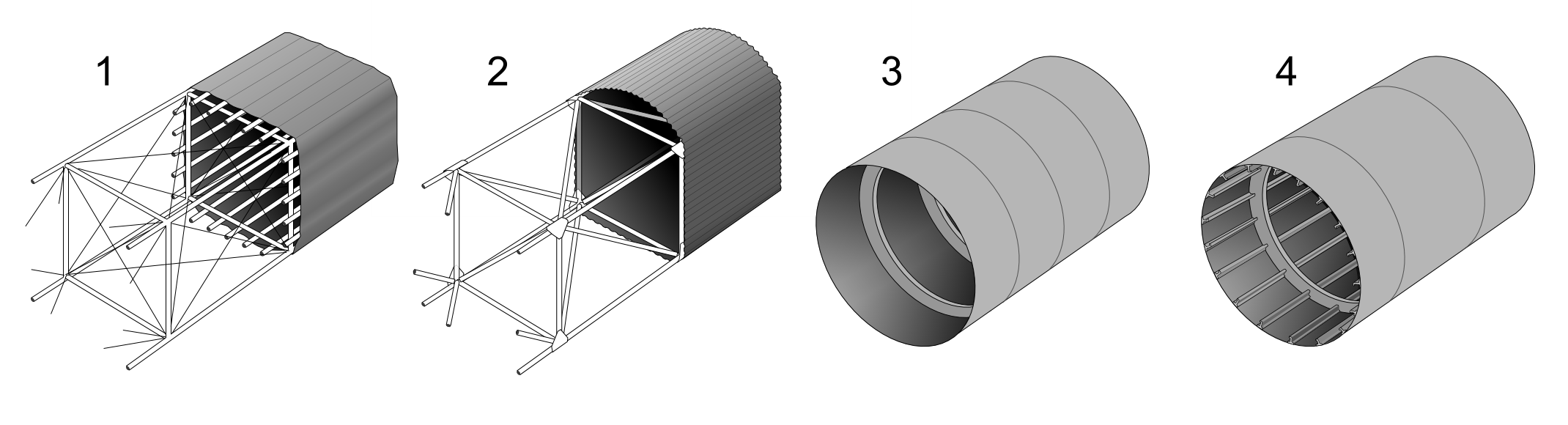
Four types of airframe construction: (1) Truss with canvas, (2) Truss with corrugate plate, (3) Monocoque construction, (4) Semi-monocoque construction.

Modern airframe history began in the United States during the Wright Flyer's maiden flight, showing the potential of fixed-wing designs in aircraft.

In 1912 the Deperdussin Monocoque pioneered the light, strong and streamlined monocoque fuselage formed of thin plywood layers over a circular frame, achieving 210 km/h (130 mph).

=== First World War ===
Many early developments were spurred by military needs during World War I. Well known aircraft from that era include the Dutch designer Anthony Fokker's combat aircraft for the German Empire's Luftstreitkräfte, and U.S. Curtiss flying boats and the German/Austrian Taube monoplanes. These used hybrid wood and metal structures.

By the 1915/16 timeframe, the German Luft-Fahrzeug-Gesellschaft firm had devised a fully monocoque all-wood structure with only a skeletal internal frame, using strips of plywood laboriously "wrapped" in a diagonal fashion in up to four layers, around concrete male molds in "left" and "right" halves, known as Wickelrumpf (wrapped-body) construction - this first appeared on the 1916 LFG Roland C.II, and would later be licensed to Pfalz Flugzeugwerke for its D-series biplane fighters.

In 1916 the German Albatros D.III biplane fighters featured semi-monocoque fuselages with load-bearing plywood skin panels glued to longitudinal longerons and bulkheads; it was replaced by the prevalent stressed skin structural configuration as metal replaced wood. Similar methods to the Albatros firm's concept were used by both Hannoversche Waggonfabrik for their light two-seat CL.II through CL.V designs, and by Siemens-Schuckert for their later Siemens-Schuckert D.III and higher-performance D.IV biplane fighter designs. The Albatros D.III construction was of much less complexity than the patented LFG Wickelrumpf concept for their outer skinning.

German engineer Hugo Junkers first flew all-metal airframes in 1915 with the all-metal, cantilever-wing, stressed-skin monoplane Junkers J 1 made of steel. It developed further with lighter weight duralumin, invented by Alfred Wilm in Germany before the war; in the airframe of the Junkers D.I of 1918, whose techniques were adopted almost unchanged after the war by both American engineer William Bushnell Stout and Soviet aerospace engineer Andrei Tupolev, proving to be useful for aircraft up to 60 meters in wingspan by the 1930s.

=== Between World wars ===
The J 1 of 1915, and the D.I fighter of 1918, were followed in 1919 by the first all-metal transport aircraft, the Junkers F.13 made of Duralumin as the D.I had been; 300 were built, along with the first four-engine, all-metal passenger aircraft, the sole Zeppelin-Staaken E-4/20. Commercial aircraft development during the 1920s and 1930s focused on monoplane designs using Radial engines. Some were produced as single copies or in small quantity such as the Spirit of St. Louis flown across the Atlantic by Charles Lindbergh in 1927. William Stout designed the all-metal Ford Trimotors in 1926.

The Hall XFH naval fighter prototype flown in 1929 was the first aircraft with a riveted metal fuselage : an aluminium skin over steel tubing, Hall also pioneered flush rivets and butt joints between skin panels in the Hall PH flying boat also flying in 1929. Based on the Italian Savoia-Marchetti S.56, the 1931 Budd BB-1 Pioneer experimental flying boat was constructed of corrosion-resistant stainless steel assembled with newly developed spot welding by U.S. railcar maker Budd Company.

The original Junkers corrugated duralumin-covered airframe philosophy culminated in the 1932-origin Junkers Ju 52 trimotor airliner, used throughout World War II by the Nazi German Luftwaffe for transport and paratroop needs. Andrei Tupolev's designs in Joseph Stalin's Soviet Union designed a series of all-metal aircraft of steadily increasing size culminating in the largest aircraft of its era, the eight-engined Tupolev ANT-20 in 1934, and Donald Douglas' firms developed the iconic Douglas DC-3 twin-engined airliner in 1936. They were among the most successful designs to emerge from the era through the use of all-metal airframes.

In 1937, the Lockheed XC-35 was specifically constructed with cabin pressurization to undergo extensive high-altitude flight tests, paving the way for the Boeing 307 Stratoliner, which would be the first aircraft with a pressurized cabin to enter commercial service.

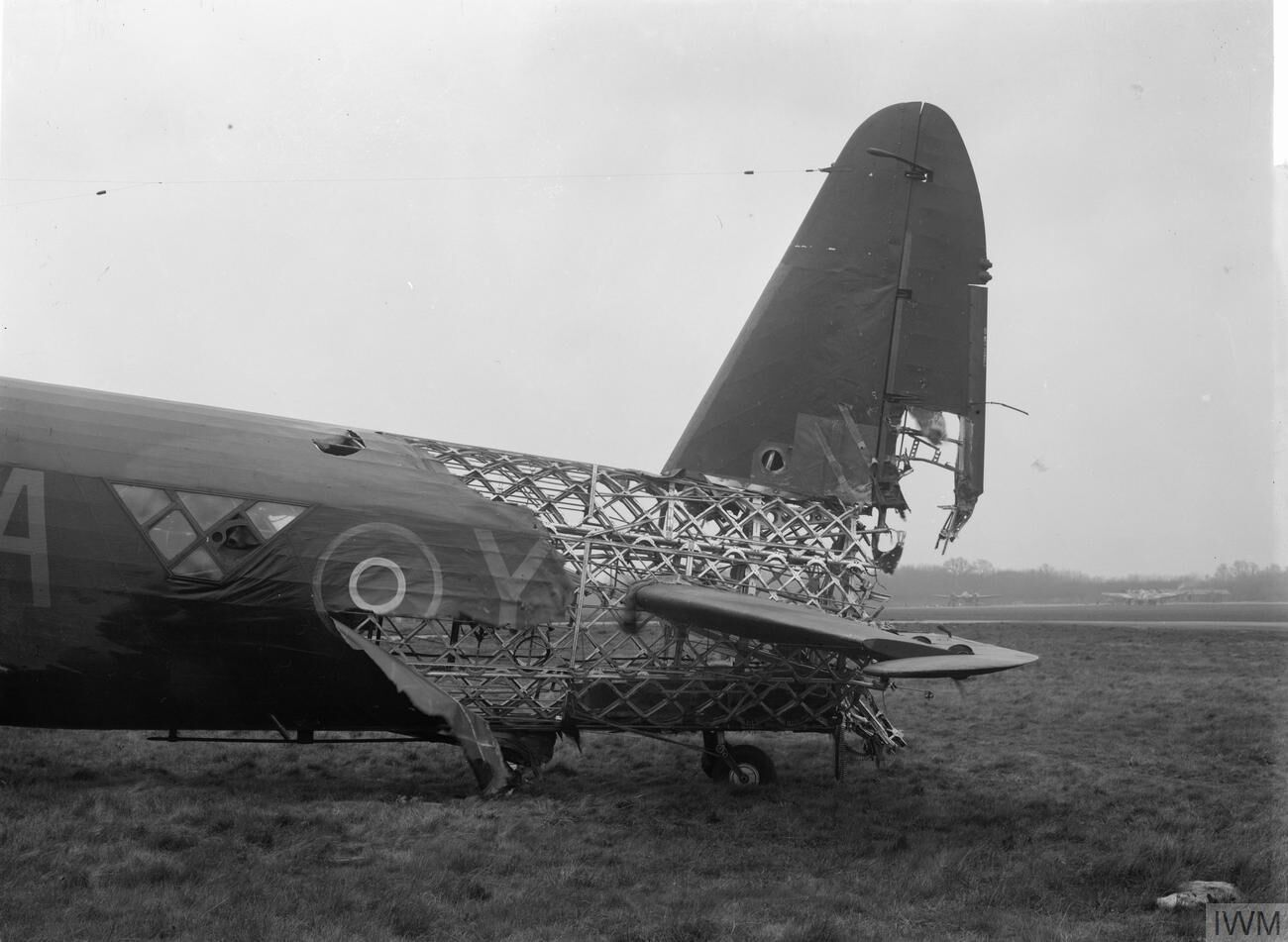
Wellington Mark X showing the geodesic airframe construction and the level of punishment it could withstand while maintaining airworthiness

=== Second World War ===
During World War II, military needs again dominated airframe designs. Among the best known were the US C-47 Skytrain, B-17 Flying Fortress, B-25 Mitchell and P-38 Lightning, and British Vickers Wellington that used a geodesic construction method, and Avro Lancaster, all revamps of original designs from the 1930s. The first jets were produced during the war but not made in large quantity.

Due to wartime scarcity of aluminium, the de Havilland Mosquito fighter-bomber was built from wood—plywood facings bonded to a balsawood core and formed using molds to produce monocoque structures, leading to the development of metal-to-metal bonding used later for the de Havilland Comet and Fokker F27 and F28.

=== Postwar ===
Postwar commercial airframe design focused on airliners, on turboprop engines, and then on jet engines. The generally higher speeds and tensile stresses of turboprops and jets were major challenges. Newly developed aluminium alloys with copper, magnesium and zinc were critical to these designs.

Flown in 1952 and designed to cruise at Mach 2 where skin friction required its heat resistance, the Douglas X-3 Stiletto was the first titanium aircraft but it was underpowered and barely supersonic; the Mach 3.2 Lockheed A-12 and SR-71 were also mainly titanium, as was the cancelled Boeing 2707 Mach 2.7 supersonic transport.

Because heat-resistant titanium is hard to weld and difficult to work with, welded nickel steel was used for the Mach 2.8 Mikoyan-Gurevich MiG-25 fighter, first flown in 1964; and the Mach 3.1 North American XB-70 Valkyrie used brazed stainless steel honeycomb panels and titanium but was cancelled by the time it flew in 1964.

A computer-aided design system was developed in 1969 for the McDonnell Douglas F-15 Eagle, which first flew in 1974 alongside the Grumman F-14 Tomcat and both used boron fiber composites in the tails; less expensive carbon fiber reinforced polymer were used for wing skins on the McDonnell Douglas AV-8B Harrier II, F/A-18 Hornet and Northrop Grumman B-2 Spirit.

=== Modern era ===
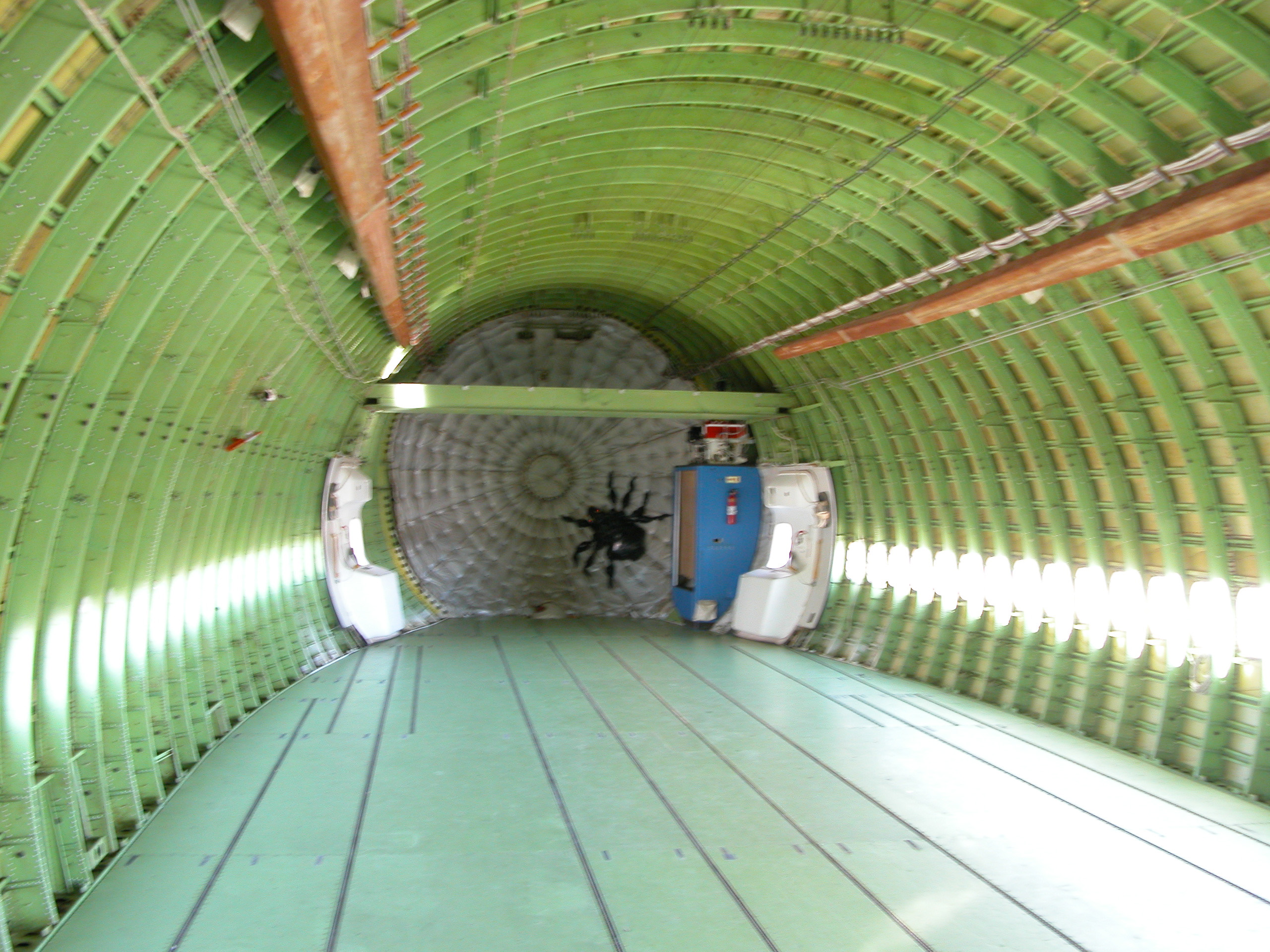
Rough interior of a Boeing 747 airframe

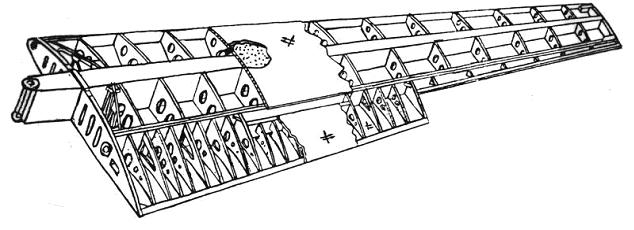
Wing structure with ribs and one spar

The vertical stabilizer of the Airbus A310-300, first flown in 1985, was the first carbon-fiber primary structure used in a commercial aircraft; composites are increasingly used since in Airbus airliners: the horizontal stabilizer of the A320 in 1987 and A330/A340 in 1994, and the center wing-box and aft fuselage of the A380 in 2005.

The Cirrus SR20, type certificated in 1998, was the first widely produced general aviation aircraft manufactured with all-composite construction, followed by several other light aircraft in the 2000s.

The Boeing 787, first flown in 2009, was the first commercial aircraft with 50% of its structure weight made of carbon-fiber composites, along with 20% aluminium and 15% titanium: the material allows for a lower-drag, higher wing aspect ratio and higher cabin pressurization; the competing Airbus A350, flown in 2013, is 53% carbon-fiber by structure weight. It has a one-piece carbon fiber fuselage, said to replace "1,200 sheets of aluminium and 40,000 rivets."

The 2013 Bombardier CSeries have a dry-fiber resin transfer infusion wing with a lightweight aluminium-lithium alloy fuselage for damage resistance and repairability, a combination which could be used for future narrow-body aircraft. In 2016, the Cirrus Vision SF50 became the first certified light jet made entirely from carbon-fiber composites.

In February 2017, Airbus installed a 3D printing machine for titanium aircraft structural parts using electron beam additive manufacturing from Sciaky, Inc.

Airliner composition by mass
Material	B747	B767	B757	B777	B787	A300B4
Aluminium	81%	80%	78%	70%	20%	77%
Steel	13%	14%	12%	11%	10%	12%
Titanium	4%	2%	6%	7%	15%	4%
Composites	1%	3%	3%	11%	50%	4%
Other	1%	1%	1%	1%	5%	3%

== Safety ==
Airframe production has become an exacting process. Manufacturers operate under strict quality control and government regulations. Departures from established standards become objects of major concern.

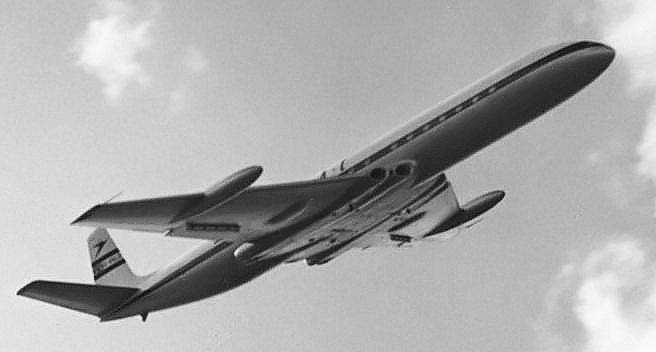
DH106 Comet 3 G-ANLO demonstrating at the 1954 Farnborough Airshow

A landmark in aeronautical design, the world's first jet airliner, the de Havilland Comet, first flew in 1949. Early models suffered from catastrophic airframe metal fatigue, causing a series of widely publicised accidents. The Royal Aircraft Establishment investigation at Farnborough Airport founded the science of aircraft crash reconstruction. After 3000 pressurisation cycles in a specially constructed pressure chamber, airframe failure was found to be due to stress concentration, a consequence of the square shaped windows. The windows had been engineered to be glued and riveted, but had been punch riveted only. Unlike drill riveting, the imperfect nature of the hole created by punch riveting may cause the start of fatigue cracks around the rivet.

The Lockheed L-188 Electra turboprop, first flown in 1957 became a costly lesson in controlling oscillation and planning around metal fatigue. Its 1959 crash of Braniff Flight 542 showed the difficulties that the airframe industry and its airline customers can experience when adopting new technology.

The incident bears comparison with the Airbus A300 crash on takeoff of the American Airlines Flight 587 in 2001, after its vertical stabilizer broke away from the fuselage, called attention to operation, maintenance and design issues involving composite materials that are used in many recent airframes. The A300 had experienced other structural problems but none of this magnitude.

== Alloys for airframe components ==
As the twentieth century progressed, aluminum became an essential metal in aircraft. The cylinder block of the engine that powered the Wright brothers’ plane at Kitty Hawk in 1903 was a one-piece casting in an aluminum alloy containing 8% copper; aluminum propeller blades appeared as early as 1907; and aluminum covers, seats, cowlings, cast brackets, and similar parts were common by the beginning of the First World War. In 1916, L. Brequet designed a reconnaissance bomber that marked the initial use of aluminum in the working structure of an airplane. By war’s end, the Allies and Germany employed aluminum alloys for the structural framework of fuselage and wing assemblies.

The aircraft airframe has been the most demanding application for aluminum alloys; to chronicle the development of the high-strength alloys is also to record the development of airframes. Duralumin, the first high-strength, heat treatable aluminum alloy, was employed initially for the framework of rigid airships, by Germany and the Allies during World War I. Duralumin was an aluminum-copper-magnesium alloy; it was originated in Germany and developed in the United States as Alloy 17S-T (2017-T4). It was utilized primarily as sheet and plate.

Alloy 7075-T6 (70,000-psi yield strength), an Al-Zn-Mg-Cu alloy, was introduced in 1943. Since then, most aircraft structures have been specified in alloys of this type. The first aircraft designed in 7075-T6 was the Navy’s P2V patrol bomber. A higher-strength alloy in the same series, 7178-T6 (78,000-psi yield strength), was developed in 1951; it has not generally displaced 7075-T6, which has superior fracture toughness.

Alloy 7178-T6 is used primarily in structural members where performance is critical under compressive loading.

Alloy 7079-T6 was introduced in the United States in 1954. In forged sections over 3 in. thick, it provides higher strength and greater transverse ductility than 7075-T6. It now is available in sheet, plate, extrusions, and forgings.

Alloy X7080-T7, with higher resistance to stress corrosion than 7079-T6, is being developed for thick parts. Because it is relatively insensitive to quenching rate, good strengths with low quenching stresses can be produced in thick sections.

Cladding of aluminum alloys was developed initially to increase the corrosion resistance of 2017-T4 sheet and thus to reduce aluminum aircraft maintenance requirements. The coating on 2017 sheet - and later on 2024-T3 - consisted of commercial-purity aluminum metallurgically bonded to one or both surfaces of the sheet.

Electrolytic protection, present under wet or moist conditions, is based on the appreciably higher electrode potential of commercial-purity aluminum compared to alloy 2017 or 2024 in the T3 or T4 temper. When 7075-T6 and other Al-Zn-Mg-Cu alloys appeared, an aluminum-zinc cladding alloy 7072 was developed to provide a relative electrode potential sufficient to protect the new strong alloys.

However, the high-performance aircraft designed since 1945 have made extensive use of skin structures machined from thick plate and extrusions, precluding the use of alclad exterior skins. Maintenance requirements increased as a result, and these stimulated research and development programs seeking higher-strength alloys with improved resistance to corrosion without cladding.

Aluminum alloy castings traditionally have been used in nonstructural airplane hardware, such as pulley brackets, quadrants, doublers, clips and ducts. They also have been employed extensively in complex valve bodies of hydraulic control systems. The philosophy of some aircraft manufacturers still is to specify castings only in places where failure of the part cannot cause loss of the airplane. Redundancy in cable and hydraulic control systems permits the use of castings.

Casting technology has made great advances in the last decade. Time-honored alloys such as 355 and 356 have been modified to produce higher levels of strength and ductility. New alloys such as 354, A356, A357, 359 and Tens 50 were developed for premium-strength castings. The high strength is accompanied by enhanced structural integrity and performance reliability.

Electric resistance spot and seam welding are used to join secondary structures, such as fairings, engine cowls, and doublers, to bulkheads and skins. Difficulties in quality control have resulted in low utilization of electric resistance welding for primary structure.

Ultrasonic welding offers some economic and quality-control advantages for production joining, particularly for thin sheet. However, the method has not yet been developed extensively in the aerospace industry.

Adhesive bonding is a common method of joining in both primary and secondary structures. Its selection is dependent on the design philosophy of the aircraft manufacturer. It has proven satisfactory in attaching stiffeners, such as hat sections to sheet, and face sheets to honeycomb cores. Also, adhesive bonding has withstood adverse exposures such as sea-water immersion and atmospheres.

Fusion welded aluminum primary structures in airplanes are virtually nonexistent, because the high-strength alloys utilized have low weldability and low weld-joint efficiencies. Some of the alloys, such as 2024-T4, also have their corrosion resistance lowered in the heat-affected zone if left in the as-welded condition.

The improved welding processes and higher-strength weldable alloys developed during the past decade offer new possibilities for welded primary structures. For example, the weldability and strength of alloys 2219 and 7039, and the brazeability and strength of X7005, open new avenues for design and manufacture of aircraft structures.

== Light aircraft ==
Light aircraft have airframes primarily of all-aluminum semi-monocoque construction, however, a few light planes have tubular truss load-carrying construction with fabric or aluminum skin, or both. Aluminum skin is normally of the minimum practical thickness: 0.015 to 0.025 in. Although design strength requirements are relatively low, the skin needs moderately high yield strength and hardness to minimize ground damage from stones, debris, mechanics’ tools, and general handling. Other primary factors involved in selecting an alloy for this application are corrosion resistance, cost, and appearance. Alloys 6061-T6 and alclad 2024-T3 are the primary choices.

Skin sheet on light airplanes of recent design and construction generally is alclad 2024-T3. The internal structure comprises stringers, spars, bulkheads, chord members, and various attaching fittings made of aluminum extrusions, formed sheet, forgings, and castings.

The alloys most used for extruded members are 2024-T4 for sections less than 0.125 in. thick and for general application, and 2014-T6 for thicker, more highly stressed sections. Alloy 6061-T6 has considerable application for extrusions requiring thin sections and excellent corrosion resistance. Alloy 2014-T6 is the primary forging alloy, especially for landing gear and hydraulic cylinders. Alloy 6061-T6 and its forging counterpart 6151-T6 often are utilized in miscellaneous fittings for reasons of economy and increased corrosion performance, when the parts are not highly stressed.

Alloys 356-T6 and A356-T6 are the primary casting alloys employed for brackets, bellcranks, pulleys, and various fittings. Wheels are produced in these alloys as permanent mold or sand castings. Die castings in alloy A380 also are satisfactory for wheels for light aircraft.

For low-stressed structure in light aircraft, alloys 3003-H12, H14, and H16; 5052-O, H32, H34, and H36; and 6061-T4 and T6 are sometimes employed. These alloys are also primary selections for fuel, lubricating oil, and hydraulic oil tanks, piping, and instrument tubing and brackets, especially where welding is required. Alloys 3003, 6061, and 6951 are utilized extensively in brazed heat exchangers and hydraulic accessories. Recently developed alloys, such as 5086, 5454, 5456, 6070, and the new weldable aluminum-magnesium-zinc alloys, offer strength advantages over those previously mentioned.

Sheet assembly of light aircraft is accomplished predominantly with rivets of alloys 2017-T4, 2117-T4, or 2024-T4. Self-tapping sheet metal screws are available in aluminum alloys, but cadmium-plated steel screws are employed more commonly to obtain higher shear strength and driveability. Alloy 2024-T4 with an anodic coating is standard for aluminum screws, bolts, and nuts made to military specifications. Alloy 6262-T9, however, is superior for nuts, because of its virtual immunity to stress-corrosion cracking.

== See also ==
- Aerostructure
- Longeron
- Former
- Chord (aeronautics)
- Aircraft fairing
- Vertical stabilizer
