= Hannover F.10 =

F.10

General information
- Type: Airliner
- National origin: Germany
- Manufacturer: Hannover
- Number built: 1

History
- Developed from: Hannover CL.II

The Hannover F.10 was an early German airliner developed shortly after World War I by Hannoversche Waggonfabrik based on their wartime escort fighters; the Hannover CL.II and its derivatives. Unlike those aircraft, which were all biplane designs, the F.10 was a single-bay triplane, with a middle wing mounted flush with the fuselage top, and a top wing mounted on struts above it. I-struts were used in the interplane gap, as on the Hannover CL.V. The fuselage was essentially similar to its military forebears, but the tail gunner's position was now enclosed as a cabin for two passengers and the wing-mounted radiator was substituted for a frontal radiator. The F.10 also featured the characteristic biplane tail unit that had been developed originally to give the tail gunner a good field of fire.

== Specifications ==
General characteristics

- Crew: One pilot
- Capacity: 2 passengers
- Powerplant: 1 × Benz Bz.IV , 164 kW (220 hp)
