= Hannover Greif =

German single-seat glider, 1922

H.2 Greif
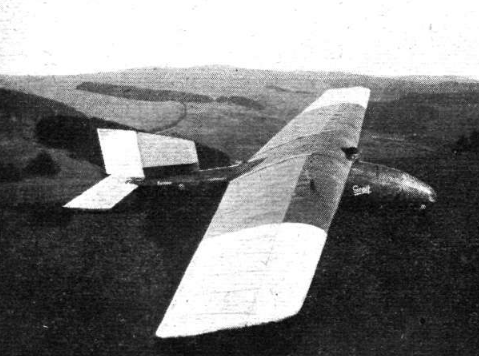

General information
- Type: Competition glider
- National origin: Germany
- Manufacturer: Hannoversche Waggonfabrik (Hannover Coach and Carriage Works)
- Designer: Arthur Martens and Fritz Heinrich Hentzen, Akaflieg Hannover
- Number built: 1

History
- First flight: 1922
- Developed from: Hannover Vampyr

The Akaflieg Hannover H.2 Greif (English: Griffon) was a 1922 development of the successful Vampyr glider. Though it flew in three successive Rhön (Wasserkuppe) contests, it failed to match the achievements of its predecessor.

== Design and development ==
The first Akaflieg Hannover glider was the Vampyr monoplane, which flew successfully at the first Rhön contest in 1921 and was probably the first heavier-than-air machine to use stressed skin construction. The Greif was a development of the Vampyr, sharing its high, thick wing, short fuselage configuration and retaining its tail, though both wing and fuselage were new.

The Greif's wing was a cantilever, three-part structure, mounted on top of the fuselage. It had a short rectangular centre section only 1.3 m (4 ft 3 in) wide and was entirely plywood-covered. Outboard the wings were straight tapered, with sweep only on the trailing edge. Each part was built around a single main spar, located at one third chord and swept slightly forward in the outer panels; there was an auxiliary spar in the centre section but not elsewhere. Beyond the centre section, for a little over half the span, plywood skin from the spar around the leading edge formed a torsion resistant box. Behind the spar the wing was fabric covered, as was all of the outer half apart from ply strengthening of the extreme tips. Lateral control was by wing warping rather than the ailerons initially fitted to the Vampyr.

The Vampyr had a fuselage with a simple rectangular cross-section but that of the Greif was more refined, with an elliptical section, though both were rather similar in profile. Both fuselages were completely ply skinned over wooden bulkheads and stringers. The Greif's wing was mounted closer to the fuselage than on its predecessor, with the consequence that a cut-out had to be made in the leading edge for the pilot's head. This turned out to have deleterious aerodynamic effects. Its undercarriage consisted of a pair of semi-recessed wheels with balloon tyres on the centreline, one under the nose and the other larger one under the wing spar. The tail surfaces of the Greif were very similar to those of the Vampyr; a rectangular all-moving tailplane was hinged at the extreme rear of the fuselage with the rudder hinged at the same point. The fin was broad as required by the short fuselage; fin and rudder had straight vertical edges and a straight, rising top. The bottom of the rudder was parallel with its top, leaving room the tailplane movement.

== Operational history ==
Both the Vampire and the Greif flew at the 3rd Rhön contests in the summer of 1922. It was expected than the Greif would out-perform the older Vampyr but despite encouraging early trials it did not; on the same day and under similar conditions the Vampyr flew for over three hours but the Greif could only manage 26 minutes. The cut-out in the leading edge for the pilot seems to have greatly increased the induced drag; the losses were much greater than those caused by similar sized trailing edge cut-outs on other designs, as the pressure differences between upper and lower surfaces and the strength of the associated lossy vortexes are smaller there.

Nevertheless, the Greif competed at the next two Rhöns, becoming well known though without distinction. By 1923 the horizontal tail had been modified to a fixed-tailplane-and-elevator configuration. Its last flight, at the Zugspitze competition in January 1925, ended with a collision into a wooden fence on landing in Garmisch-Partenkirchen that destroyed the Greif.

== Specifications ==
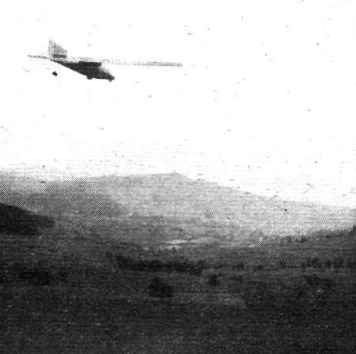
At the 1922 Rhön competition

Data from Historische Deutsche Flugzeug bis 1945

General characteristics

- Crew: One
- Length: 5.32 m (17 ft 5 in)
- Wingspan: 11.60 m (38 ft 1 in)
- Height: 1.85 m (6 ft 1 in)
- Wing area: 16.0 m^{2} (172 sq ft)
- Aspect ratio: 8.4
- Empty weight: 80 kg (176 lb)
- Gross weight: 176 kg (388 lb)
- Wing loading: 11 kg/m^{2} (2.3 lb/sq ft)

Performance

- Maximum glide ratio: 16:1
- Rate of sink: 0.8 m/s (160 ft/min) minimum

== See also ==
Related lists

- List of gliders
