= Hannover C.IV =

WWI biplane prototype

C.IV, F.3
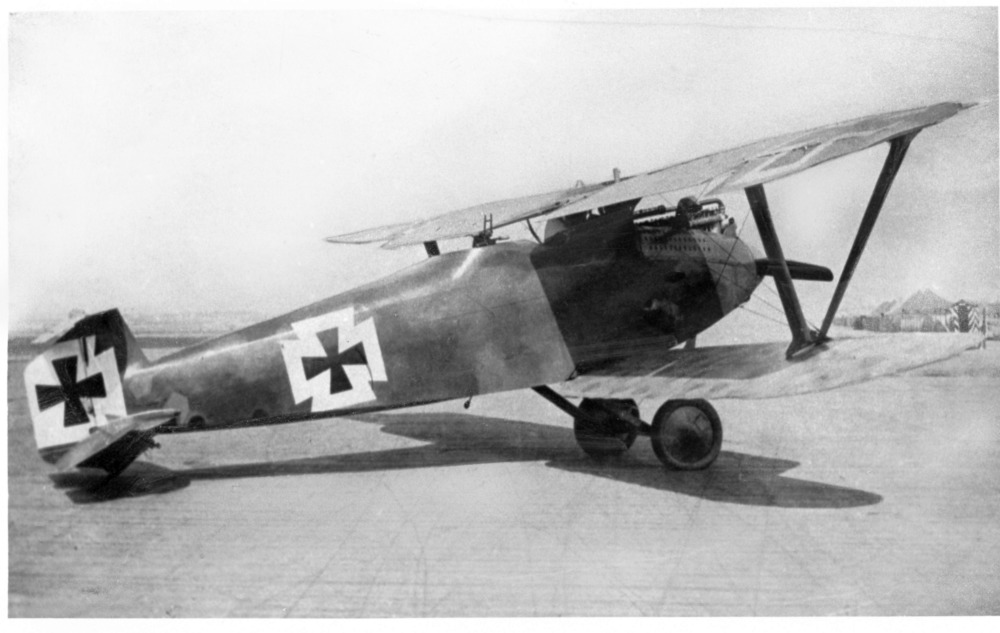

General information
- Type: reconnaissance aircraft
- National origin: Germany
- Manufacturer: Hannover
- Number built: 1, 2 or 5

The Hannover C.IV was a prototype high-altitude reconnaissance aircraft built by the Hannoversche Waggonfabrik during the First World War for the Imperial German Army's (Deutsches Heer) Imperial German Air Service (Luftstreitkräfte). Completed in 1918 it was approved for service in March, but was not awarded a production contract as it offered no improvement over Rumpler C.VII (Rubild) already in service.

== Development ==
Derived from the two-seat CL.III, the C.IV shared the same basic conventional single-bay wing configuration with the unusual biplane tail of that aircraft. It was armed with two 7.92 mm (0.312 in) machine guns; one forward-firing LMG 08/15 and a flexible Parabellum MG 14 machine gun for the observer. Structurally it differed in having each wing braced with a pair of I struts that connected two points on the upper wing between the spars, one mid span and one near the tip, to a single point on the lower wing, so that from the front or rear, they appeared as a V, but from the side as an I. The aircraft was equipped with a water-cooled 245-horsepower (183 kW) Maybach Mb.IVa straight-six engine that was specifically designed for high-altitude operations.

The C.IV was designed by Hermann Dorner to compete in the Inspectorate of Flying Troops (Inspektion der Fliegertruppen's (Idflieg) high-altitude reconnaissance competition in April–May 1918. It passed its acceptance trials on 19 March and was approved for service use, but it was not superior to the Rumpler C.VII (Rubild) and did not enter production. A slightly modified C.IV was tested by Idflieg in June with unknown results. Sources disagree on whether one, two or five aircraft were built.

== Specifications (C.IV) ==
Data from German Aircraft of the First World War; Hannover Aircraft of WWI: A Centennial Perspective on Great War Airplanes.

General characteristics

- Crew: 2
- Length: 7.8 m (25 ft 7 in)
- Upper wingspan: 12.56 m (41 ft 2 in)
- Lower wingspan: 11.4 m (37 ft 5 in)
- Height: 2.95 m (9 ft 8 in)
- Wing area: 33.6 m^{2} (362 sq ft)
- Empty weight: 960 kg (2,116 lb)
- Gross weight: 1,395 kg (3,075 lb)
- Powerplant: 1 × Maybach Mb.IVa water-cooled, 89 kW (120 hp)
- Propellers: 2-bladed

Performance

- Maximum speed: 160 km/h (99 mph, 86 kn)
- Endurance: 3 hours
- Service ceiling: 9,000 m (30,000 ft)
- Time to altitude: 4.5 minutes to 1,000 m (3,300 ft)

Armament

- Guns: 2 × 7.92 mm (0.312 in) machine guns; one forward-firing LMG 08/15 and a flexible Parabellum MG 14 machine gun for the observer
