= Staffelsee =

Lake in Garmisch-Partenkirchen, Bavaria, Germany

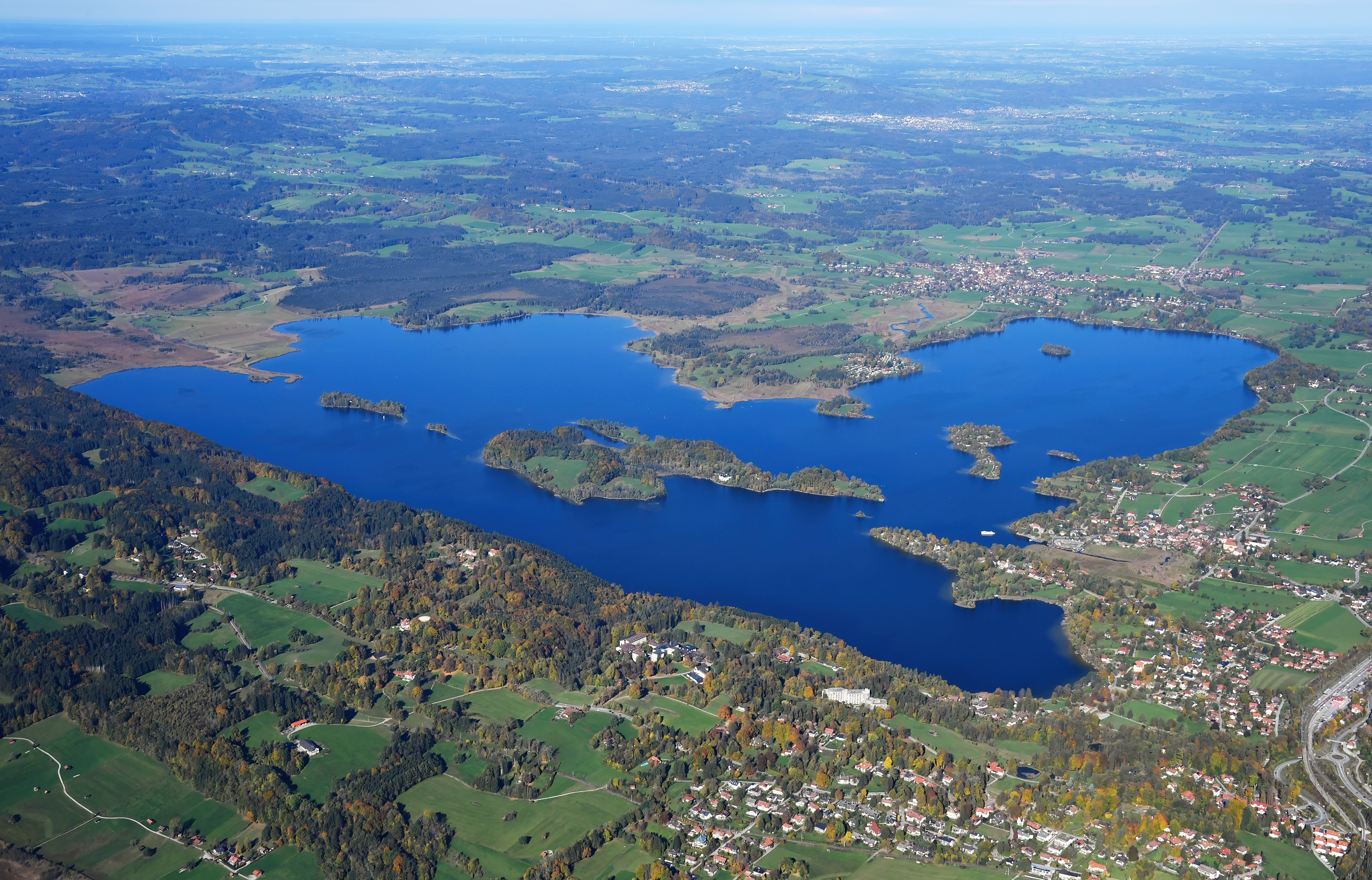
- Staffelsee from the southeast

- Location within Bavaria
- Location: Murnau am Staffelsee, Garmisch-Partenkirchen
- Coordinates: 47.689°N 11.163°E
- Primary inflows: River Ach
- Primary outflows: River Ach
- Catchment area: 80.66 km^{2} (31.14 sq mi)
- Basin countries: Germany
- Max. length: 9.575 kilometres (5.950 mi)
- Max. width: 6.838 kilometres (4.249 mi)
- Surface area: 7.66 square kilometres (2.96 sq mi)
- Average depth: 9.8 metres (32 ft)
- Max. depth: 39.4 metres (129 ft)
- Water volume: 74.88×10^{6} m^{3} (60,710 acre⋅ft)
- Shore length^{1}: 19.31 kilometres (12.00 mi)
- Surface elevation: 649 metres (2,129 ft)
- Islands: 7
- ^{1} Shore length is not a well-defined measure.

The Staffelsee is a lake in the Garmisch-Partenkirchen district of Bavaria, Germany. The settlements of Murnau, Seehausen and Uffing lie on its shores. Within its 7 km^{2} (2.7 sq mi) area lie seven islands, the largest and only inhabited of which is Wörth. Wörth was the site of Staffelsee abbey, a Carolingian monastery founded in the 8th century and dissolved in the 11th century.

Boat trips aboard the MS Seehausen (built 2009) connect the landing stages of Seehausen, Uffing and Achele (Murnau) between April and October. The surface of the lake is, on average, 649 metres (2,129 ft) above sea level, and at its deepest it is around 40 metres (130 ft) deep.

The main inflow and outflow of the lake is the River Ach, which enters from the west and departs to the north.

The northeastern part of the lake is known as Untersee, the southeastern part as Stegsee and the southwestern part as Obersee (see map below).
