= Ach (Ammer) =

River in Bavaria, Germany

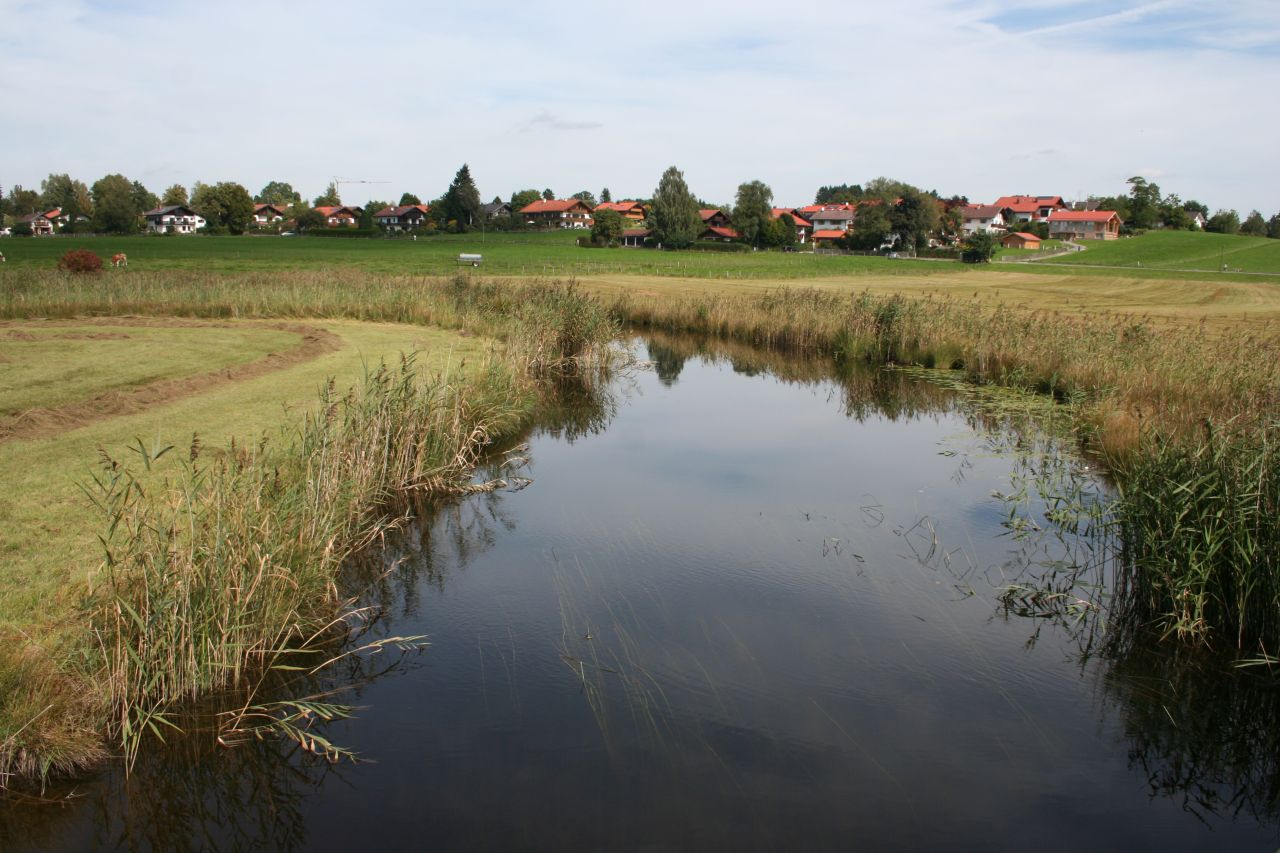
- River Ach south of Uffing

- Mouth

Location
- Country: Germany
- State: Bavaria

Physical characteristics
- Mouth
  - location: Ammer
  - coordinates: 47.7841°N 11.1077°E
- Length: 43.0 km (26.7 mi)
- Basin size: 120 km^{2} (46 sq mi)

Basin features
- Progression: Amper→ Isar→ Danube→ Black Sea

The Ach is a tributary of the Ammer river in Bavaria, Germany. Its total length, including its source rivers the Glotzenbach and Bärenbach, is 43 kilometres (27 mi). It is the main river flowing through the Staffelsee, and flows into the Ammer east of Peißenberg.

== List of tributaries ==
- Bärenbach
- Gotzenbach
- Mühlbach
- Faurermoosbach
- Blezenbach
- Stegschachengraben
- Knollgraben
- Bannholzgraben
- Buchgraben
- Säuggraben
- Möschengraben
- Stichgraben
- Holzgraben
- Staffelsee
- Greinbach
- Röthenbach
- Antlasgraben
- Zeilbach
- Tiefenbach
- Röllgraben

== See also ==
- List of rivers of Bavaria
