= Uffing =

Uffing am Staffelsee
- Municipality
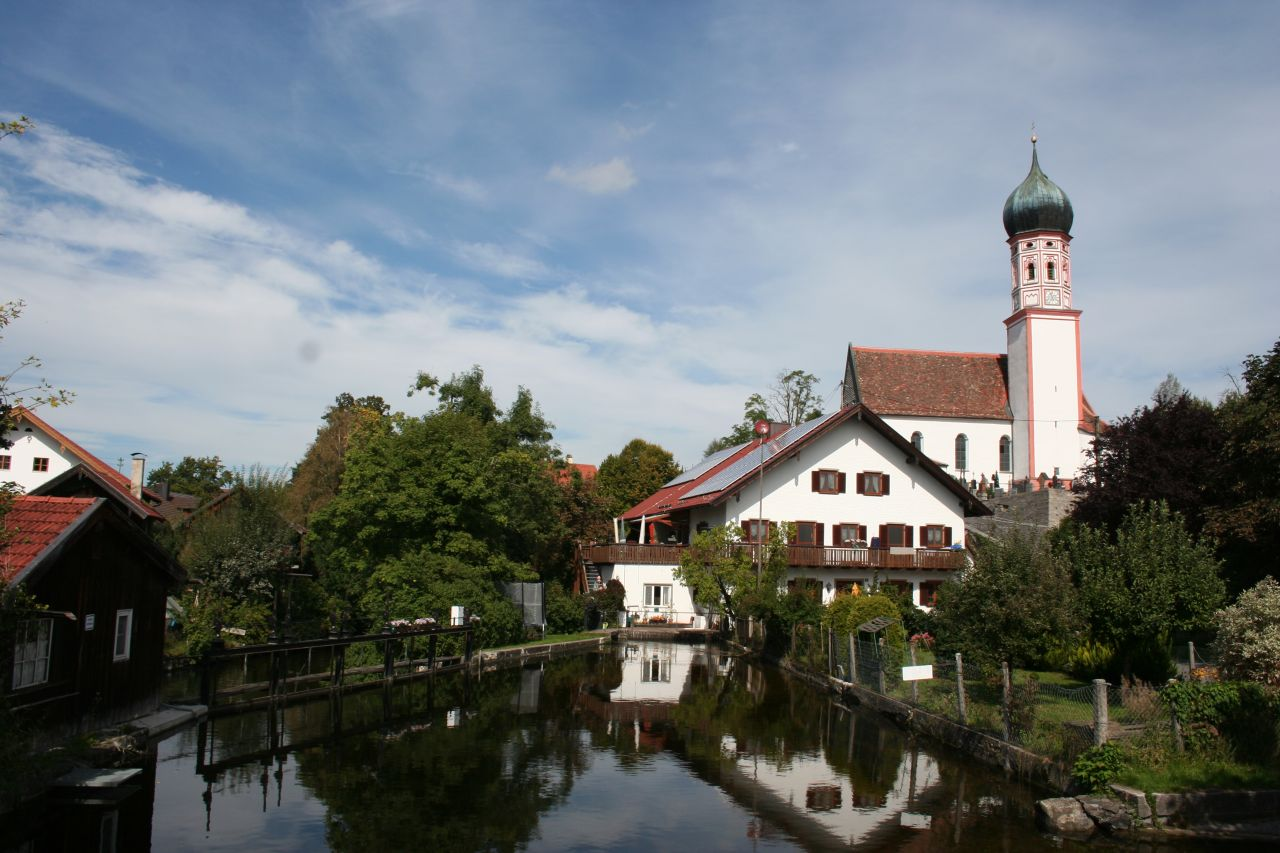
- Church of Saint Agatha and the River Ach

- Coat of arms

- Location of Uffing am Staffelsee within Garmisch-Partenkirchen district
- Interactive map of Uffing am Staffelsee
- Location within Germany Location within Bavaria
- Coordinates: 47°43′N 11°9′E
- Country: Germany
- State: Bavaria
- Admin. region: Oberbayern
- District: Garmisch-Partenkirchen

Government
  - Mayor (2020–2026): Andreas Weiß

Area
  - Total: 43.00 km^{2} (16.60 sq mi)
- Elevation: 659 m (2,162 ft)

Population (2025-12-31)
  - Total: 3,156
  - Density: 73.40/km^{2} (190.1/sq mi)
- Time zone: UTC+01:00 (CET)
  - Summer (DST): UTC+02:00 (CEST)
- Postal codes: 82449
- Dialling codes: 08846
- Vehicle registration: GAP
- Website: www.uffing.de

Uffing am Staffelsee (officially, Uffing a.Staffelsee; Bavarian: Uffing am Staffesee) is a municipality in the district of Garmisch-Partenkirchen, in Bavaria, Germany. It consists of the two villages of Uffing and Schöffau and is located on Staffelsee, the warmest lake in Germany. The River Ach flows through Uffing.

== Names ==
The name Uffing derives from the personal name Uffo and the possessive suffix -ing. Other attested historical forms of the name include Vfinga, Uffingen and Üffing.

== Transport ==
The town can be reached by car or by train (Deutsche Bahn). Uffing has its own station on the Munich–Garmisch-Partenkirchen line. The nearest international airport is Munich International Airport.

== Economy ==
Uffing benefits from several shops including a bakery (Mayer-Nett), pharmacy, supermarket (Edeka), butcher, and Frau Bauer's drugstore.

== Culture ==
The parish church is dedicated to St Agatha (German: Agathe).

Uffing is home to Europe's only gay Schuhplattler group.

The annual Seefest ("Lake Festival"), held in the first week of August (weather permitting), is a celebration of local music, dancing, and customs. The event is usually rounded off with a firework display.

== Notable people ==
- Georg Hans Madelung (1889 in Rostock – 1972 in Uffing), academic and aeronautical engineer
