= Georg Hans Madelung =

German academic and aeronautical engineer

- Born: 31 July 1889; Rostock, German Empire
- Died: 17 August 1972 (aged 83); Uffing, West Germany
- Occupation: Engineer

Georg Hans Madelung (31 July 1889 in Rostock – 17 August 1972 in Uffing) was a German academic and aeronautical engineer. Madelung studied at several German universities of technology before his service as a pilot in the First World War. After the war he lectured and worked in Germany and the United States, working on a number of significant aeronautical achievements. Madelung joined the Nazi Party in 1937, and during the Second World War was involved with aeronautical warfare research, including work with Wernher von Braun's rocket program. After the cessation of hostilities, Madelung resumed academic work in both Germany and the USA. Madelung's research at the Naval Medical Research Institute, Bethesda, Maryland included the effects of high acceleration on the human body. He permanently returned to live in Germany from 1954 until his death in 1972. The second son of his marriage to Elisabeth Emma née Messerschmitt was Wilferd Madelung, a noted scholar in Islamic studies.

== Early life ==
Madelung's father was Otto Wilhelm Madelung, a surgeon and medical researcher, and his mother was Hedwig Madelung, née Köhler.

== Education ==
From 1895 to 1907, Madelung was schooled at a Protestant gymnasium in Strasbourg. He volunteered for military service in 1907. Madelung studied at the University of Strasbourg (1907–1908), the Technical University of Karlsruhe (1908–1909), Leibniz University Hannover (1909–1910), and Technische Universität Berlin from 1910 to 1919. He was belatedly awarded a Bachelor of Engineering degree from Technische Universität Berlin in 1919, and was admitted as Doctor of Engineering of Leibniz University Hannover in 1921.

== WWI service ==
Madelung was trained as a pilot and may have flown some combat missions in the First World War. He was involved with fellow engineer Fritz Haber's deployment of poison gas. In 1915 Madelung was retained as an assistant at the Deutsche Versuchsanstalt für Luftfahrt"—acronym DVL—the "German Aviation Laboratory".

== Between the wars ==
=== Junkers F. 13 project ===
In 1919, Madelung was a participant in the development of the Junkers F.13, a pioneering all-metal stressed-skin low-wingcantilever wing monoplane. On 13 September 1919, the F.13 was flown to a then-record altitude of 6 750 metres.

=== "Vampyr" glider ===
Madelung was the designer of the 1921 "Hannover Vampyr" glider, which has been claimed to be the model for all modern sailplanes.

=== Work in the United States ===
From 1921 to 1924 Madelung worked as an airplane designer in the United States.

=== Return to Germany ===
Madelung returned to Germany and the DVL in 1925. In 1929, he was appointed to the office of director-general of the airplane department and a member of the board of the DVL. In 1937, he joined the Nazi Party, and in the same year was appointed the director of the re-formed Deutsche Akademie der Luftfahrtforschung (German Aviation Research Academy).

== World War II ==
After the outbreak of World War II, in 1941 Madelung formed the Forschungsanstalt Graf Zeppelin ("Count Zeppelin Research Institute") with Madelung himself as director. The Institute worked on bombs, torpedo guidance, depth charges, and construction of airplane catapults. Madelung was considered an expert in bomb construction. Later in the war, he was involved with Wernher von Braun's Raketenprogramm.

== Later life ==
After the defeat of Nazi Germany, Madelung resumed academic work at the University of Stuttgart. From 1946 to 1954, Madelung was a visiting scholar at the USA Naval Medical Research Institute, Bethesda, Maryland, where he was involved with studies into the ability of the human body to bear large accelerations. He left the US for Germany again in 1954.

== Personal life ==
Madelung married Elisabeth Emma Messerschmidt in 1927. The couple had three daughters and two sons. Their first son Gero Otto George (born 1928) was a professor for aviation technology at the Ludwig-Maximilians-Universität München and member of the supervisory board of Bosch AG. Their second son Wilferd Ferdinand (born 1930) was a professor of Oriental Studies at Oxford University and is the author of numerous scholarly works in Islamic studies.

== See also ==
- Pulse-jet
- List of German inventors and discoverers
