= Hannover CL.V =

Attack biplane model

CL.V, F.6, FF.7 Hauk
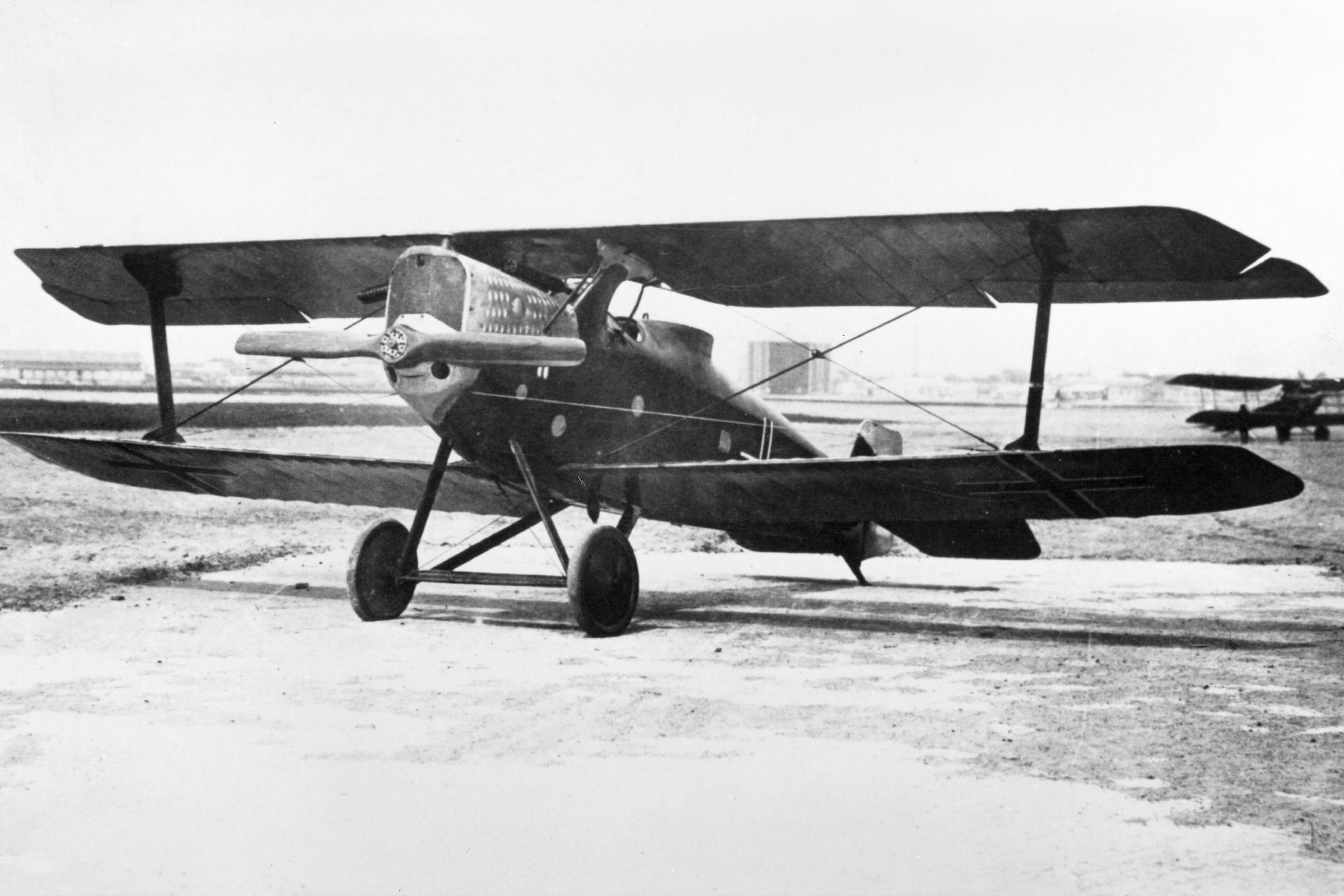

General information
- Type: Attack aircraft
- National origin: Germany
- Manufacturer: Hannover, Kjeller
- Primary users: Luftstreitkräfte Norwegian Army Air Service
- Number built: ca 120

History
- First flight: 1918

The Hannover CL.V was a biplane ground-attack aircraft built in Germany during World War I, which saw some service and additional production in Norway following the war.

== Development ==
Derived from the Hannover CL.II, the CL.V shared the same conventional biplane configuration and incorporated the overhanging, aerodynamically-balanced ailerons developed for the Hannover CL.III. The characteristic biplane tail used on earlier Hannover CL-class machines was dispensed with, and a conventional empennage was fitted to the prototype, although German production machines reverted to the earlier tail.

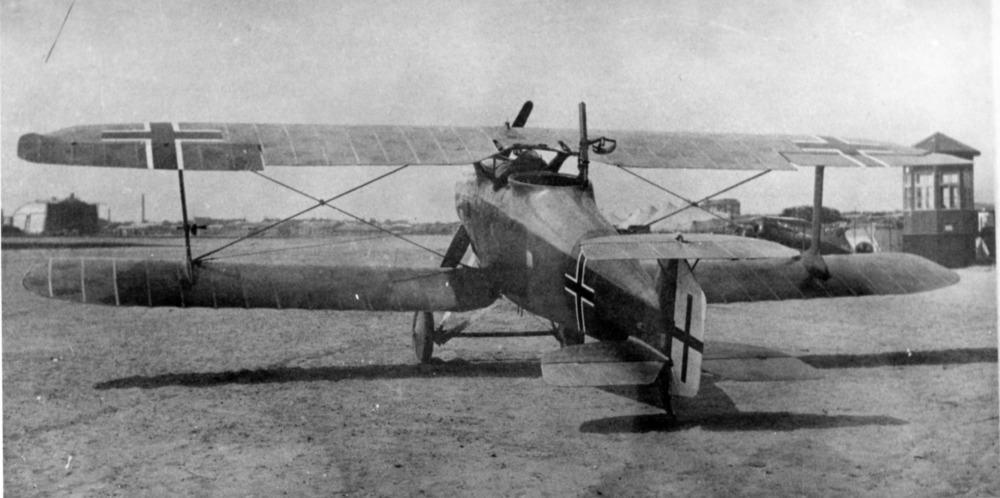
Hannover CL.V with biplane tail

The CL.V was first tested in July 1918, which led to an initial order from Idflieg for 20 aircraft powered by the Mercedes D.III engine for evaluation. Further orders followed for CL.Vs powered by the BMW IIIa engine, which gave superior performance and were intended as dedicated two-seat fighters. Only 46 were built before the end of the war, and none of them had been put into service by that time. Hannover built another 62 examples after the Armistice.

In its civil configuration, designated F.6, the aircraft dispensed with the rear cockpit, and used the monoplane tail unit that had been fitted to the CL.V prototype. One stripped-down example was used to set a world altitude record of 8,340 m (27,335 ft) on 22 October 1919.

In 1923, another 14 CL.Vs were produced for the Norwegian Army Air Service by Kjeller Flyvemaskinsfabrik with the original monoplane tail. These were known by the Norwegians as the Kjeller FF.7 Hauk ("Hawk") and remained in service until 1929.

== Operators ==
German Empire

- Luftstreitkräfte

Norway

- Norwegian Army Air Service

== Survivors ==
- Kjeller FF7. Hauk. Cockpit section at Norwegian Museum of Science and Technology in Oslo, Norway

== Specifications (CL.V) ==
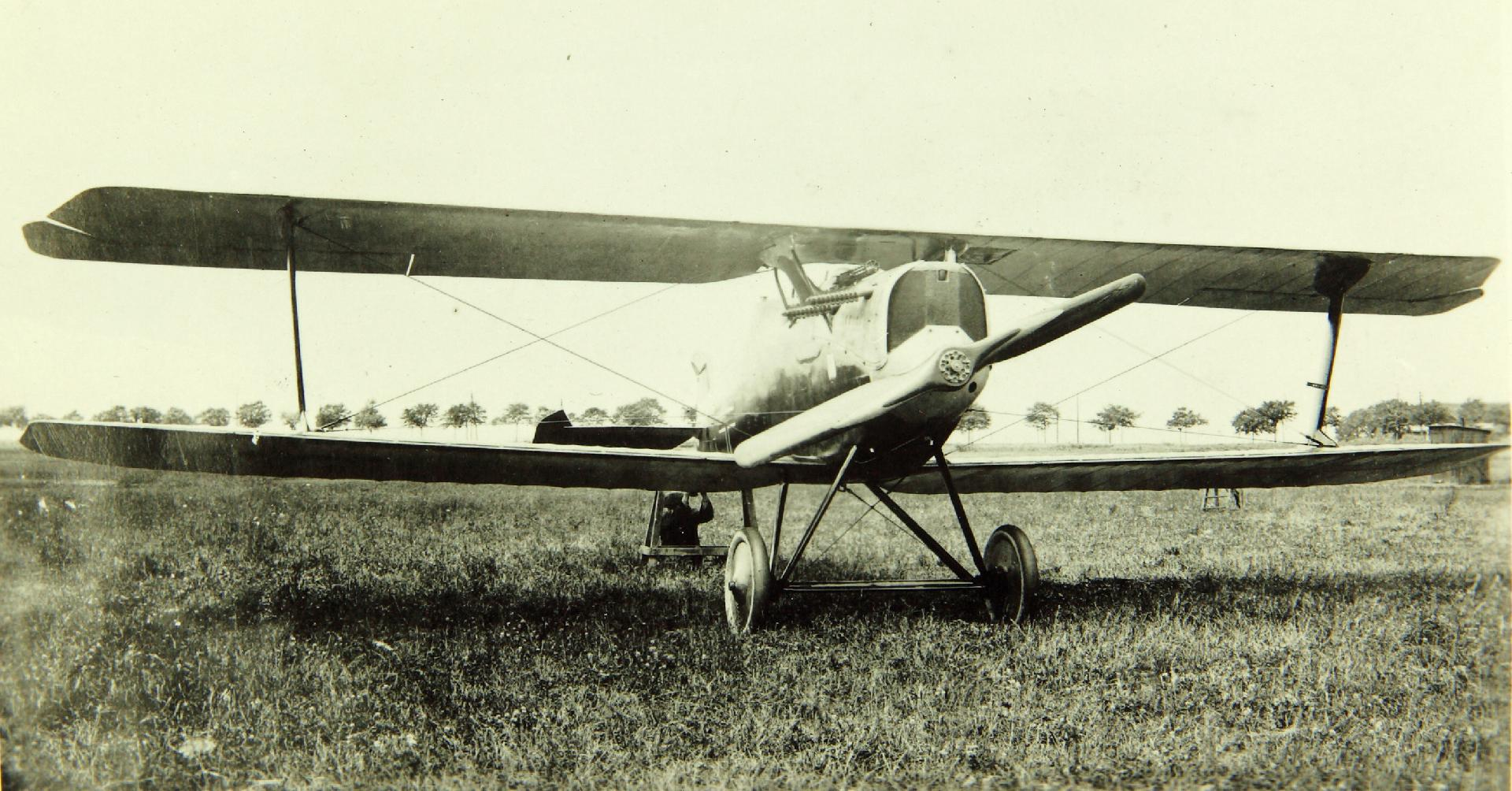
Hannover CL.V

General characteristics

- Crew: two, pilot and gunner
- Length: 7.00 m (23 ft 0 in)
- Wingspan: 10.56 m (34 ft 8 in)
- Height: 2.84 m (9 ft 3 in)
- Wing area: 28.5 m^{2} (307 sq ft)
- Empty weight: 720 kg (1,587 lb)
- Gross weight: 1,080 kg (2,380 lb)
- Powerplant: 1 × BMW IIIa , 138 kW (185 hp)

Performance

- Maximum speed: 185 km/h (115 mph, 100 kn)
- Endurance: 3 hours
- Service ceiling: 9,000 m (29,530 ft)
- Rate of climb: 5.0 m/s (990 ft/min)

Armament

- 2 × fixed, forward-firing 7.92 mm MG08 machine guns
- 1 × trainable, rearward-firing 7.92 mm Parabellum MG14 machine gun

== Bibliography ==
- Grosz, Peter M. "Hannover Aircraft 1915–1919:Part 2". Air Pictorial (August 1971): 290–293.
- Kabatek, Mateusz & Kulczynski, Fr. Robert SDB (2022). German Aircraft in Polish Service: Volume 1: Halberstadt Cl.II, Cl.IV, C.V; LVG C.VI; & Hannover Cl.V. Great War Aviation Centennial Series. Vol. 70. n.p.: Aeronaut Books. ISBN 978-1-953201-58-4.
- Taylor, Michael J. H. (1989). Jane's Encyclopedia of Aviation. London: Studio Editions. p. 469. ISBN 0-7106-0710-5.
- World Aircraft Information Files. London: Bright Star Publishing. pp. File 986 Sheet 09. ISBN 1-156-94382-5.
