= Hermann Dorner =

German aviator

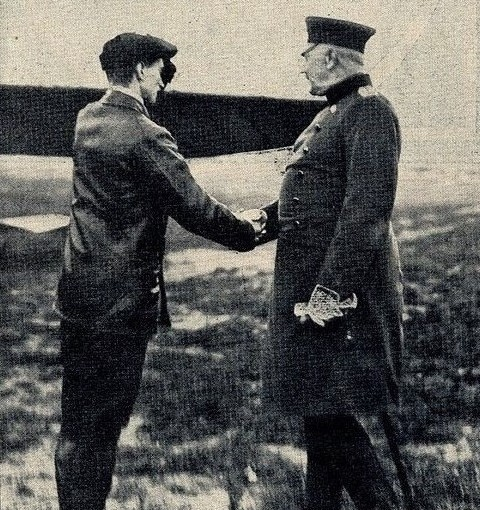
Dorner in conversation with General von Moltke (1910)

Hermann Dorner (23 May 1882 – 6 February 1963) was a German pioneer of aviation. During the First World War he was the chief designer at Deutsche Flugzeug-Werke before he transferred to Hannoversche Waggonfabrik in 1916 where he designed two-seat combat aircraft for, most notably the Hannover CL.II through Hannover CL.IV designs.
