= Hannover H 1 Vampyr =

German single-seat glider, 1921

Vampyr
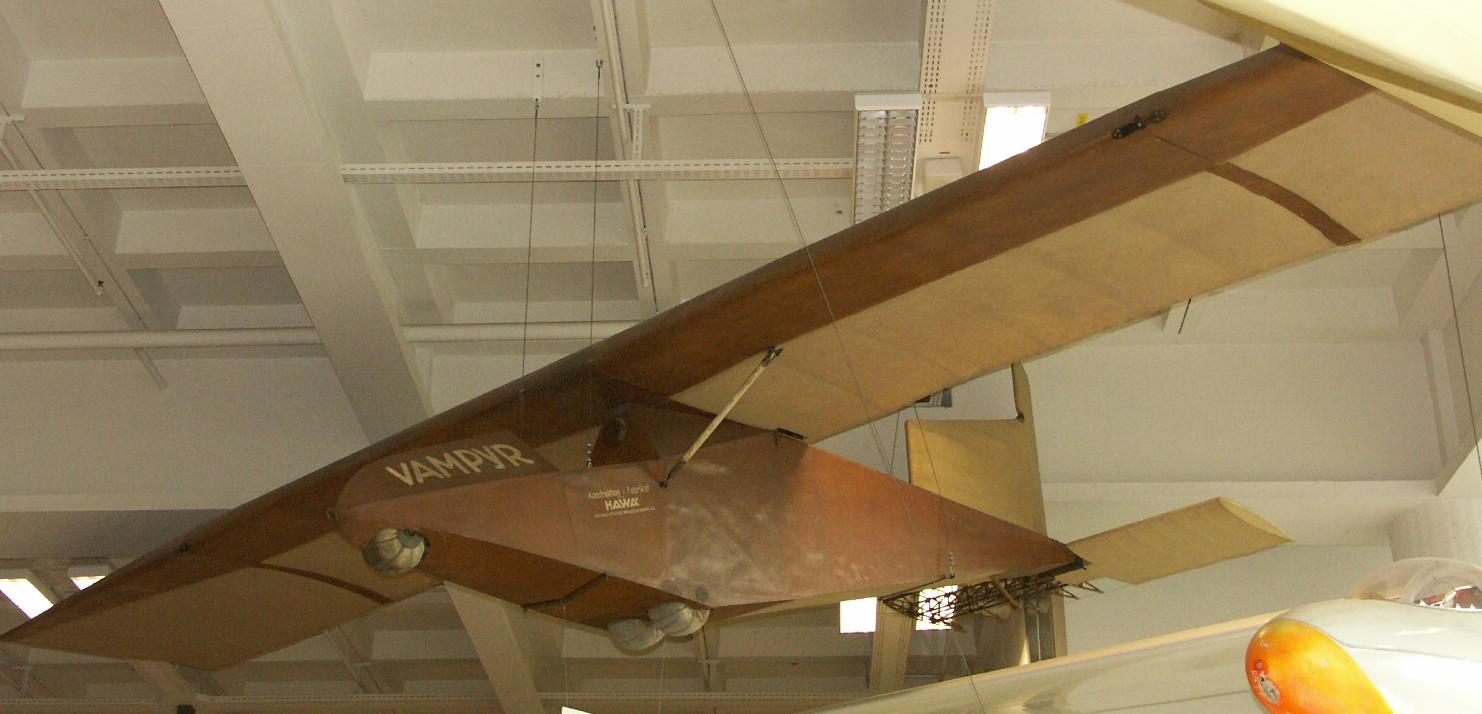
- The Vampyr exhibited in the Deutsches Museum, Munich. It has the 1922 wing warping tips and the 1923 extended rudder.

General information
- Type: Glider
- National origin: Germany
- Manufacturer: Hannoversche Waggonfabrik (HaWa)
- Designer: Georg Hans Madelung
- Number built: 1

History
- First flight: 1921

The Hannover H.1 Vampyr (known in Germany as the HaWa Vampyr) was a German glider designed by Georg Madelung for the 1921 Rhön gliding competition, which was held at the Wasserkuppe from 8 August to 25 August 1921. The Vampyr is believed to be the first heavier than air aircraft to use stressed skin. Several historical societies have argued that the aircraft is the precursor of all modern sailplanes.

== Design and development ==
The Vampyr was designed by Georg Hans Madelung, a lecturer at the aerotechnical institute of Leibniz University Hannover, along with students at his university, working under the supervision of Professor Arthur Proell. The aircraft, built at the Hannoverische Waggonfabrik (HaWa) workshops using wood as the primary material, was simple in appearance, but the Vampyr heralded the structural techniques that were to become commonplace as the sport of gliding progressed:Box framed fuselage covered with plywood as a stressed skin, three piece wings with detachable outer panels, a torsion box leading edge, and an enclosed cockpit (only the pilots head was exposed).

The most innovative part of the aircraft was its wing. The majority of gliders at this time were monoplanes, and it was becoming appreciated that better performance in terms of glide ratio would come with higher aspect ratio. Long wings were vulnerable to torsional flexing and so most used two spar designs. The Vampyr's designers used a single spar and stabilized the wing with ply covering forward of the spar around the leading edge. This formed a torsion resisting D-box and was probably the first use of stressed skin on any aircraft apart from airships.

Behind the spar the wing was fabric covered. It was built in three parts, a rectangular centre section and two tapered outer panels bearing ailerons. By 1922 these had been replaced by parallel, swept sections with provision for wing warping. The strength of the wing, mounted on top of the fuselage, required only short lift struts between the spar and fuselage. The pilot sat under the wing leading edge in an open cockpit; forward of the wing extra fuselage panels gave the fuselage a hexagonal cross-section. Three balls, one in the nose and two side by side under mid-wing formed the undercarriage.

Flying controls were essentially conventional with fin, rudder, all-flying tailplane, and ailerons on the outer panels on the 1921 version. For the 1922 competition outer panels of increased area and wing-warping control were introduced.

== Operational history ==
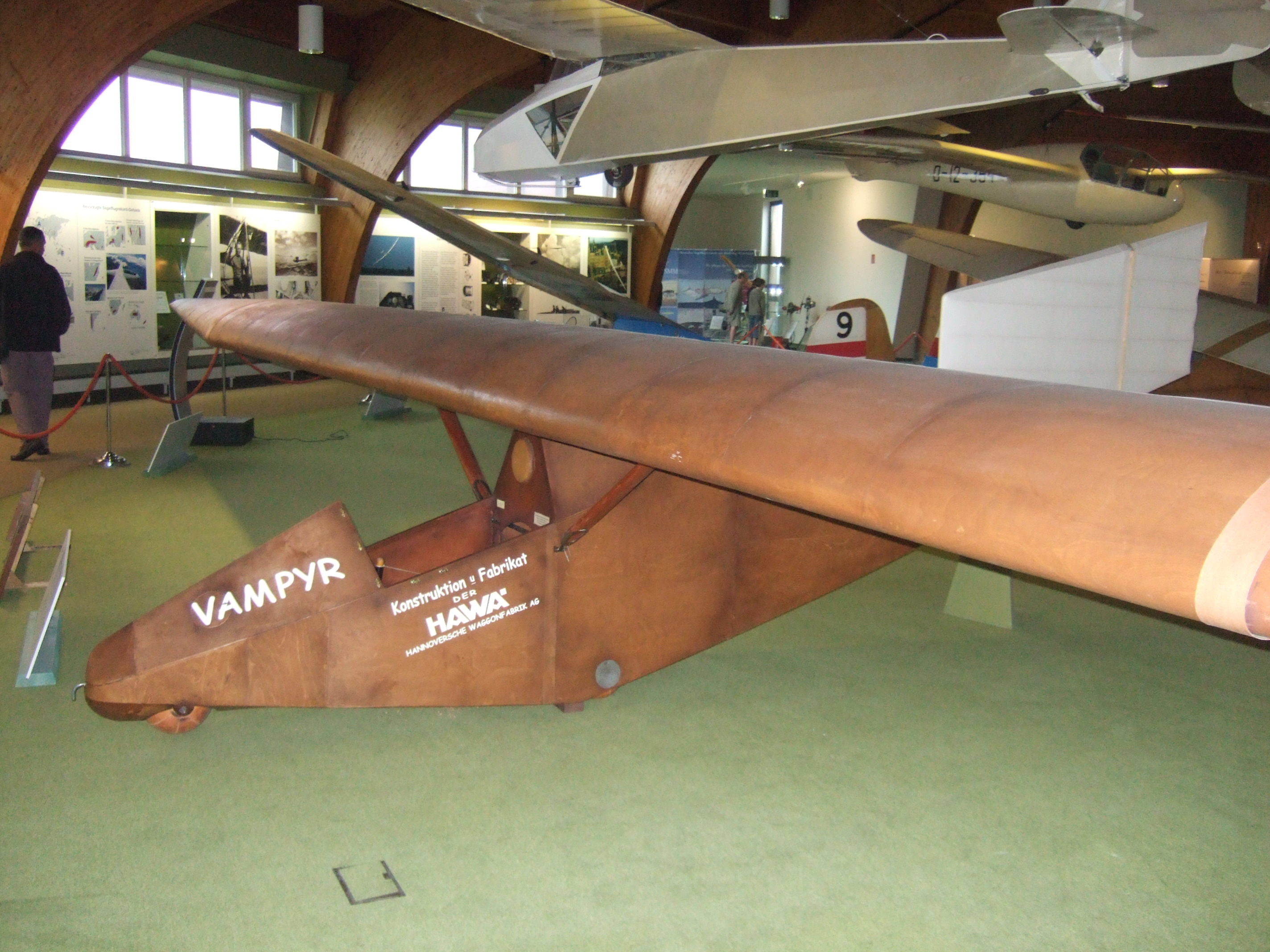
Vampyr replica at the Deutsches Segelflugmuseum mit Modellflug (German Glider Museum) Wasserkuppe

The Vampyr was built specifically to compete in the 1921 Rhön Gliding competition at the Wasserkuppe. Arriving late with only three flying days remaining the Vampyr, given the entry number of 45and flying marking I, flown by Arthur Martens, soon demonstrated superior performance over the competition. Several long glides were carried out, unfortunately some long duration flights, which could have taken the first prize, were shortened due to Martens circling. No soaring was witnessed on competition flights, with the exception of the short tragic flight of Leusch in the Weltensegler.

Unfortunately the Vampyr suffered a launch accident on its last launch in the competition, which resulted in other gliders overtaking it on the leader board. Despite the set-back the Vampyr still managed to earn some plaudits:

- 3rd prize, of 2,000 Marks, for lowest mean sinking speed.
- 2nd prize, of 3,000 Marks, for the longest distance covered.
- The Kyffhauser-Flugspende, Frankenhausen Wing prize of 1,000 Marks.
- Highest co-efficient of glide (sic) prize of 15,000 Marks.

After the competition ended, several gliders stayed behind to hone their skills including the Vampyr, which was swiftly repaired after its launching accident. In early September the Vampyr made a 7.5 kilometre flight but still without soaring.

The Vampyr continued flying after the 1921 competition and appeared at the 1922 Rhön competition with redesigned outer wing panels of greater area featuring wing warping instead of ailerons for roll control. At the 1922 competition steadily improving flights resulted in a flight time of 3hrs 10 min was recorded at an altitude of 350 m (1,150 ft) on 19 August 1922, flown by Frederick Hentzen.

Refined developments named Strolch and Moritz were developed by Karl Bremer for Arthur Martens and flown in subsequent Rhön Gliding competitions.

Today the sole Vampyr resides on display in the Deutsches Museum München (German Museum, Munich). A replica is also on display at the Deutsches Segelflugmuseum mit Modellflug (German Glider Museum) at the Wasserkuppe.

== Variants ==
Hannover H1 Vampyr (1921)
The initial version of the Vampyr entered in the 1921 gliding competition at the Wasserkuppe.

Hannover H1 Vampyr (1922)
The Vampyr refined with greater wing area and wing warping in lieu of ailerons. Flown with success at the 1922 Rhön competition.

Akaflieg Hannover Strolch
Built by Karl Bremer the Strolch was essentially an upgraded Vampyr with greater span /aspect ratio, built for Arthur Martens. Continued the success of the Vampyr at the 1923, 1924 and 1925 Rhön competitions, until it was destroyed early in the 1925 competition after spinning in when being flown by Karl Bedall.

Akaflieg Hannover Moritz
A sister copy of the Vampyr with the long span wings and aileron controls. Marten won the 1925 competition flying the Moritz and went on to set a new duration record in the Crimea that year by flying for over 12 hours.

== Specifications (1921 version) ==
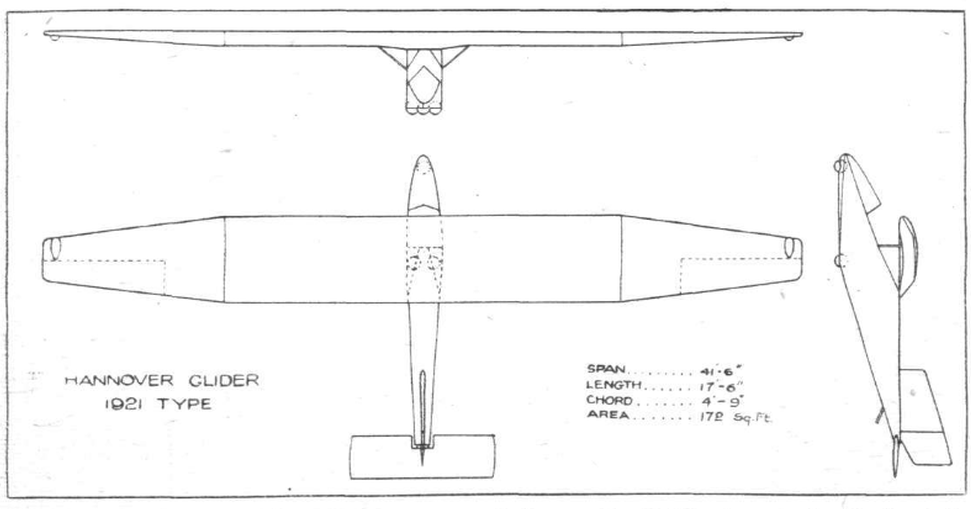
The 1921 version

Data from Sailplanes 1920-1945; Performance, Deutsches Museum

General characteristics

- Crew: One
- Length: 5.54 m (18 ft 2 in)
- Wingspan: 12.60 m (41 ft 4 in)
- Wing area: 16.0 m^{2} (172 sq ft)
- Aspect ratio: 9.95
- Airfoil: Göttingen 441 (Gŏttingen 482)
- Empty weight: 120 kg (265 lb)
- Gross weight: 210 kg (463 lb)

Performance

- Rate of sink: 0.75 m/s (148 ft/min) approximately
- Lift-to-drag: best about 16
- Wing loading: 12 kg/m^{2} (2.5 lb/sq ft)

== See also ==
- List of gliders

== Bibliography ==
- Lemke, Frank-Dieter; Jacob, Rolf (2011). "The academic flying groups in Germany until 1945 part 2". Fliegerrevue Extra (in German) (32): 60.
- "Akaflieg Hannover Vampyr, 1921" (in German). Munich: Deutsches Museum.
- "The Hannover glider". Flight. Vol. XIV, no. 35. 31 August 1922. pp. 499–501.
- "German gliders". Flight. Vol. XIV, no. 36. 31 August 1922. pp. 454–6.
- "The 1925 Vauville meeting". Flight. Vol. XVII, no. 33. 13 August 1925. p. 523.
