= Hannover CL.III =

Multi-role military biplane

CL.III
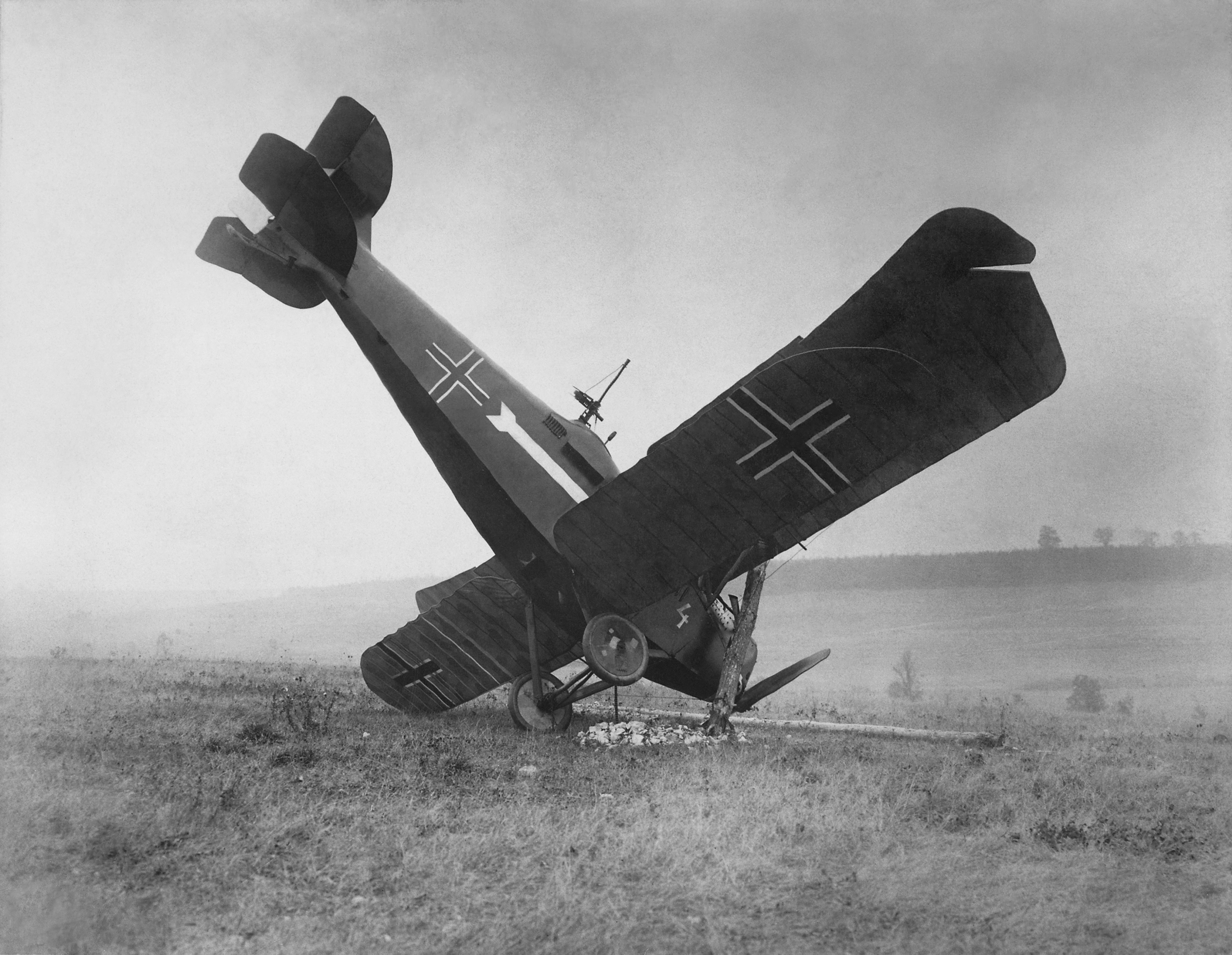
- A German Hannover CL.III shot down by American machine gunners at Meuse-Argonne.

General information
- Type: Ground attack aircraft
- National origin: Germany
- Manufacturer: Hannoversche Waggonfabrik
- Designer: Hermann Dorner
- Primary user: Luftstreitkräfte
- Number built: 617

History
- First flight: 1917
- Developed from: Hannover CL.II

The Hannover CL.III was a two-seat, single-bay biplane built by the Hannoversche Waggonfabrik during the First World War for the Imperial German Army's (Deutsches Heer) Imperial German Air Service (Luftstreitkräfte). It was a multi-role aircraft derived from the CL.II, used to escort reconnaissance aircraft and as a ground-attack machine. It entered service early in 1918.

== Development ==
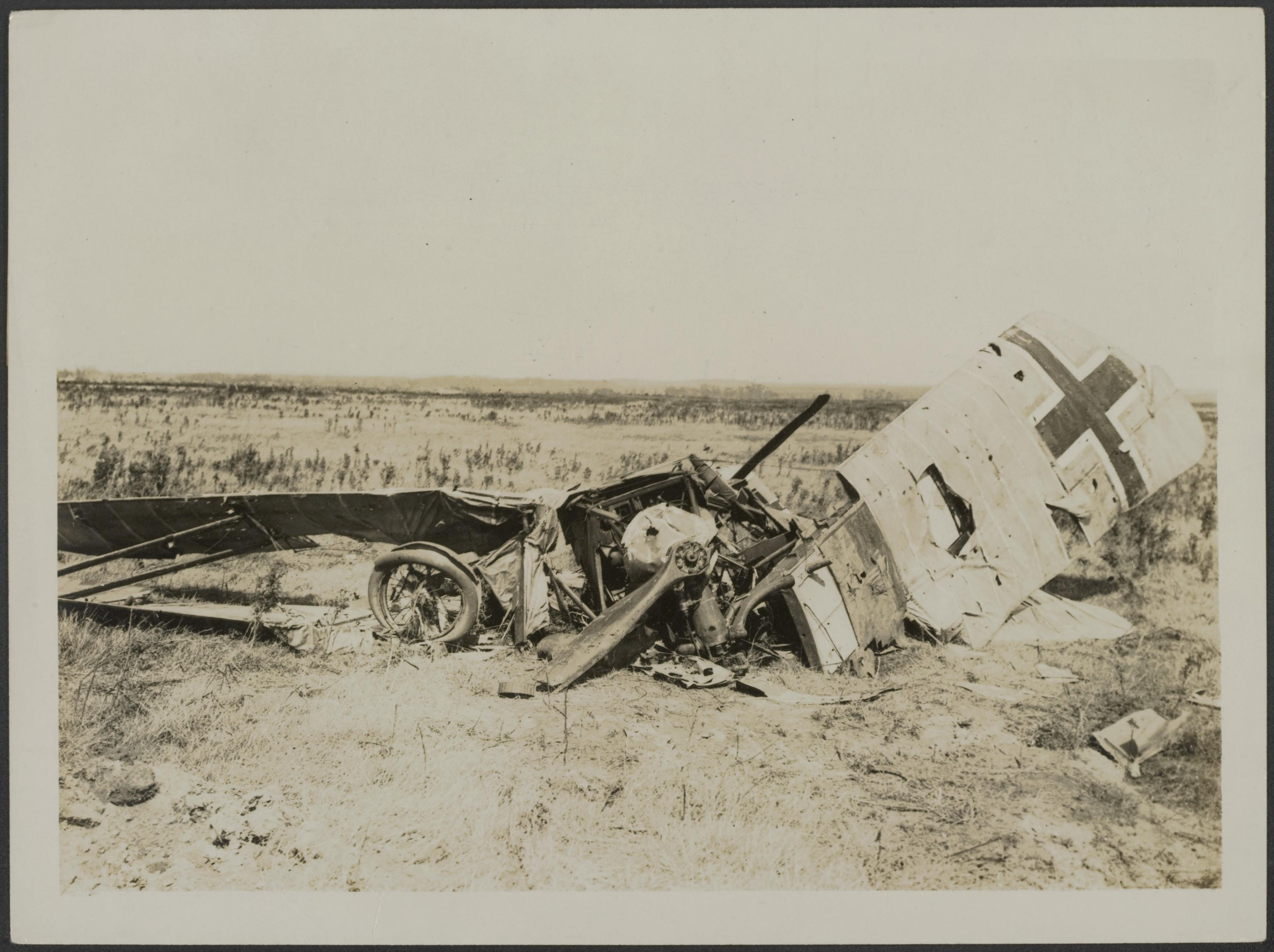
A crash-landed Hannover CL.III on the Western Front about September 1918

The CL.III (factory designation Typ 3b) was derived from the CL.II; its airframe was lightened and strengthened to improve performance and it was designed to use the water-cooled 160-horsepower (120 kW) Mercedes D.III straight-six engine rather than the 180-horsepower (130 kW) Argus As.III engine even though most D.III engines were reserved for fighters. In the event most aircraft used the readily available As.III engines. The Argus-engined variant was designated CL.IIIa. The aircraft had redesigned ailerons with aerodynamic balances that overhung the wingtips, a modification that provided greater manoeuvrability, especially at the low levels that it was expected to be operating at in its new ground-attack role as the Schutzstaffeln (escort squadrons) were reassigned as Schlachtstaffeln (battle squadrons). Like the other Hannover "light-C-class", or "CL" designated aircraft designed by Hermann Dorner, it included an unusual tail structure, with two horizontal stabilizers which allowed a wider field of fire for the observer.

The CL.IIIb was an experimental aircraft that that was used to evaluate the 190-horsepower (140 kW) NAG C.III engine. After the war, a single CL.III was developed into the HaWa F.3, a limousine aircraft with seats for two passengers in an enclosed cabin where the gunner's cockpit had been.

== Variants ==
Hannover CL.III
Powered by a Mercedes D.III engine.
Hannover CL.IIIa
CL III powered by an Argus As.III engine
Hannover CL.IIIc
Experimental model of the CL.III, with a two-bay wing.
HaWa F.3
A post-war limousine conversion of CL.III aircraft, with a 2-seat limousine cabin behind the pilot's cockpit.

== Operators ==
German Empire

- Luftstreitkräfte

Latvia (Postwar)

- Latvian Air Force – 2 CL.IIIa

Poland

- Polish Air Force – 1 CL.IIIa (1919-1920)

Soviet Union

- Soviet Air Force

== Specifications (CL.IIIa) ==
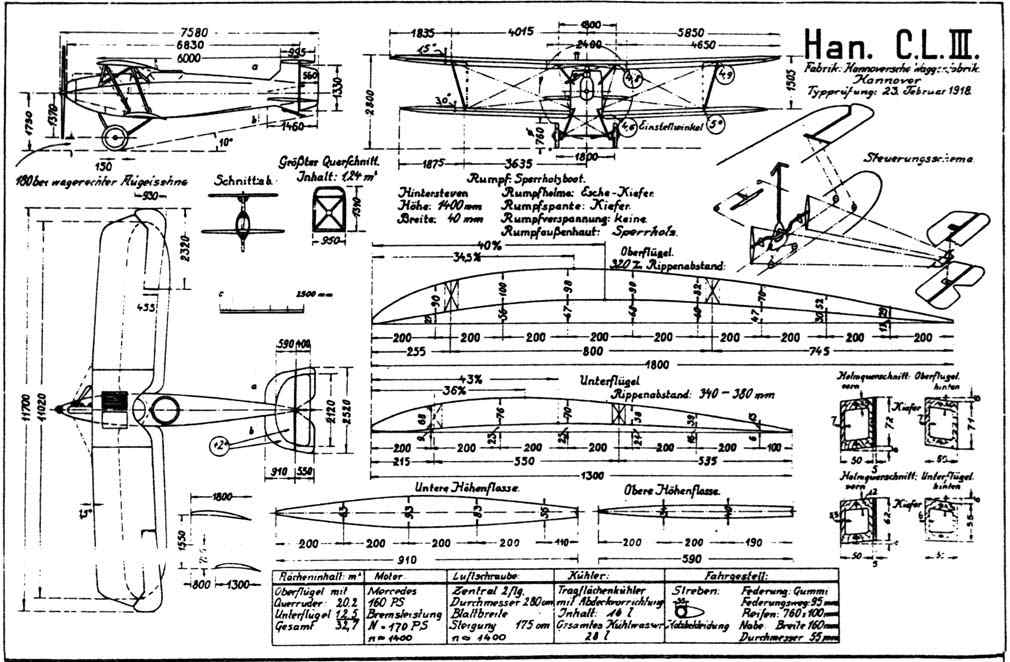
Hannover CL.III Baubeschreibung drawing, required by IdFlieg submission regulations

Data from Hannover CL.III; Hannover Aircraft of WWI: A Centennial Perspective on Great War Airplanes.

General characteristics

- Crew: 2
- Length: 7.58 m (24 ft 10 in)
- Upper wingspan: 11.7 m (38 ft 5 in)
- Lower wingspan: 11.02 m (36 ft 2 in)
- Height: 2.8 m (9 ft 2 in)
- Wing area: 32.7 m^{2} (352 sq ft)
- Empty weight: 760 kg (1,676 lb)
- Gross weight: 1,120 kg (2,469 lb)
- Powerplant: 1 × Argus As III water-cooled straight-six piston engine, 130 kW (180 hp) (CL.IIIa)

or 1x 160 hp (120 kW) Mercedes D.III (CL.III)

Performance

- Maximum speed: 165 km/h (103 mph, 89 kn)
- Time to altitude: 3.2 minutes to 1,000 m (3,300 ft)
- 7.1 minutes to 2,000 m (6,600 ft)

Armament

- Guns: 2 × 7.92 mm (0.323 in); one synchronized LMG 08/15 machine gun firing forward, single ring-mounted Parabellum MG 14 in observer's cockpit
- Bombs: 4 × small bombs

== See also ==
Related lists

- List of military aircraft of Germany
- List of fighter aircraft

== Bibliography ==
- Gray, Peter & Thetford, Owen (1987) [1970]. German Aircraft of the First World War (2nd ed.). London: Putnam. ISBN 0-85177-809-7.
- Grosz, Peter M. (1990). Hannover CL.III. Windsock Datafile. Vol. 23. Berkhampstead, UK: Albatros Publications. ISBN 0-948414-27-8.
- Klaauw, Bart van der (March–April 1999). "Unexpected Windfalls: Accidentally or Deliberately, More than 100 Aircraft 'Arrived' in Dutch Territory during the Great War". Air Enthusiast (80): 54–59. ISSN 0143-5450.
- Owers, Colin A. & Herris, Jack (2020). Hannover Aircraft of WWI: A Centennial Perspective on Great War Airplanes. Great War Aviation Centennial Series. Vol. 43. n.p.: Aeronaut Books. ISBN 978-1-935881-84-1.
