= Hannoversche Waggonfabrik =

German aircraft manufacturer

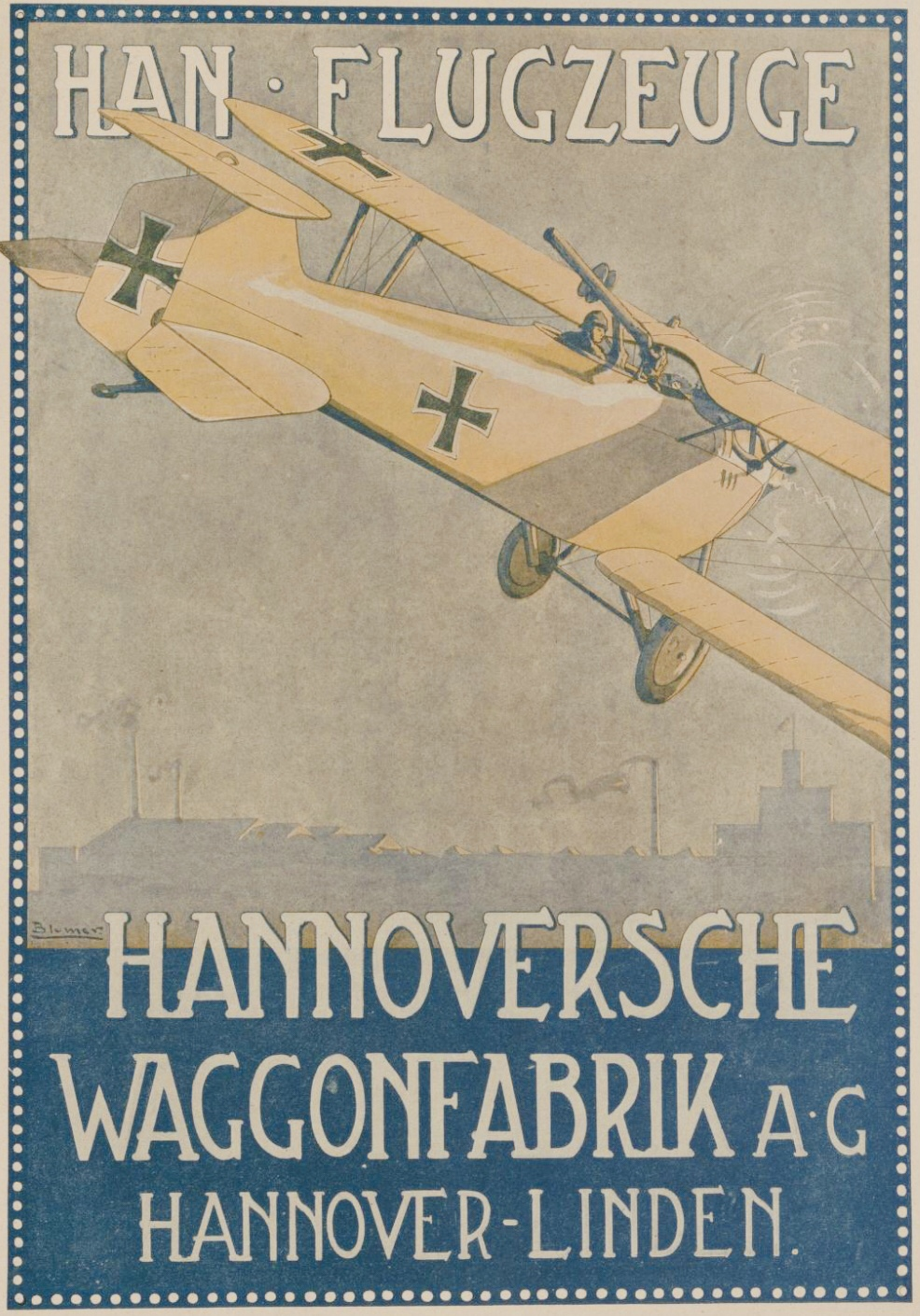
Hannoversche Waggonfabrik AG (1918)

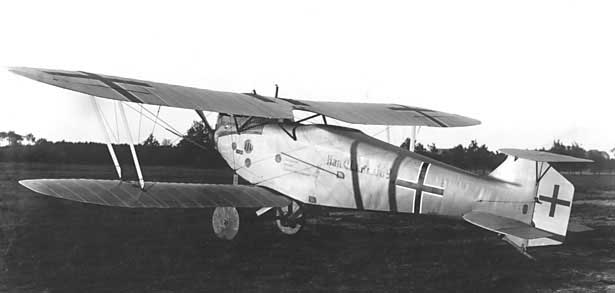
A Hannover CL.II escort fighter.

Hannoversche Waggonfabrik AG was a German aircraft manufacturer of the World War I era. It was known as a railway rolling stock constructor until required by the German government in 1916 to start the construction of aeroplanes. The aircraft branch of the company was established at Hannover-Linden where other types were first manufactured under licence until 1916 when the Hannover type itself came on stream.

== History ==
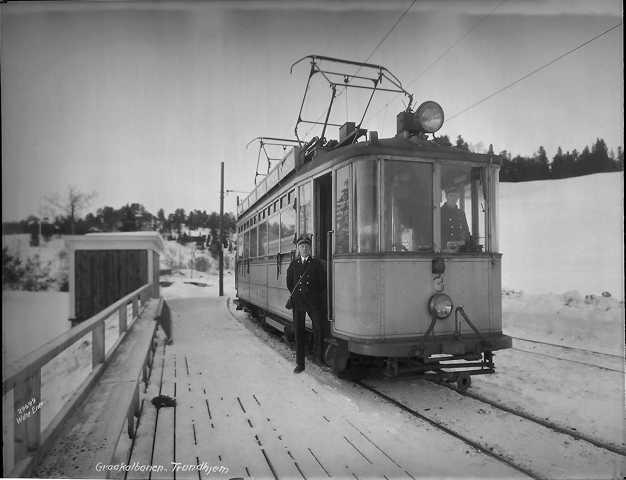
GB Class 1 tram delivered to the Trondheim Tramway in 1924

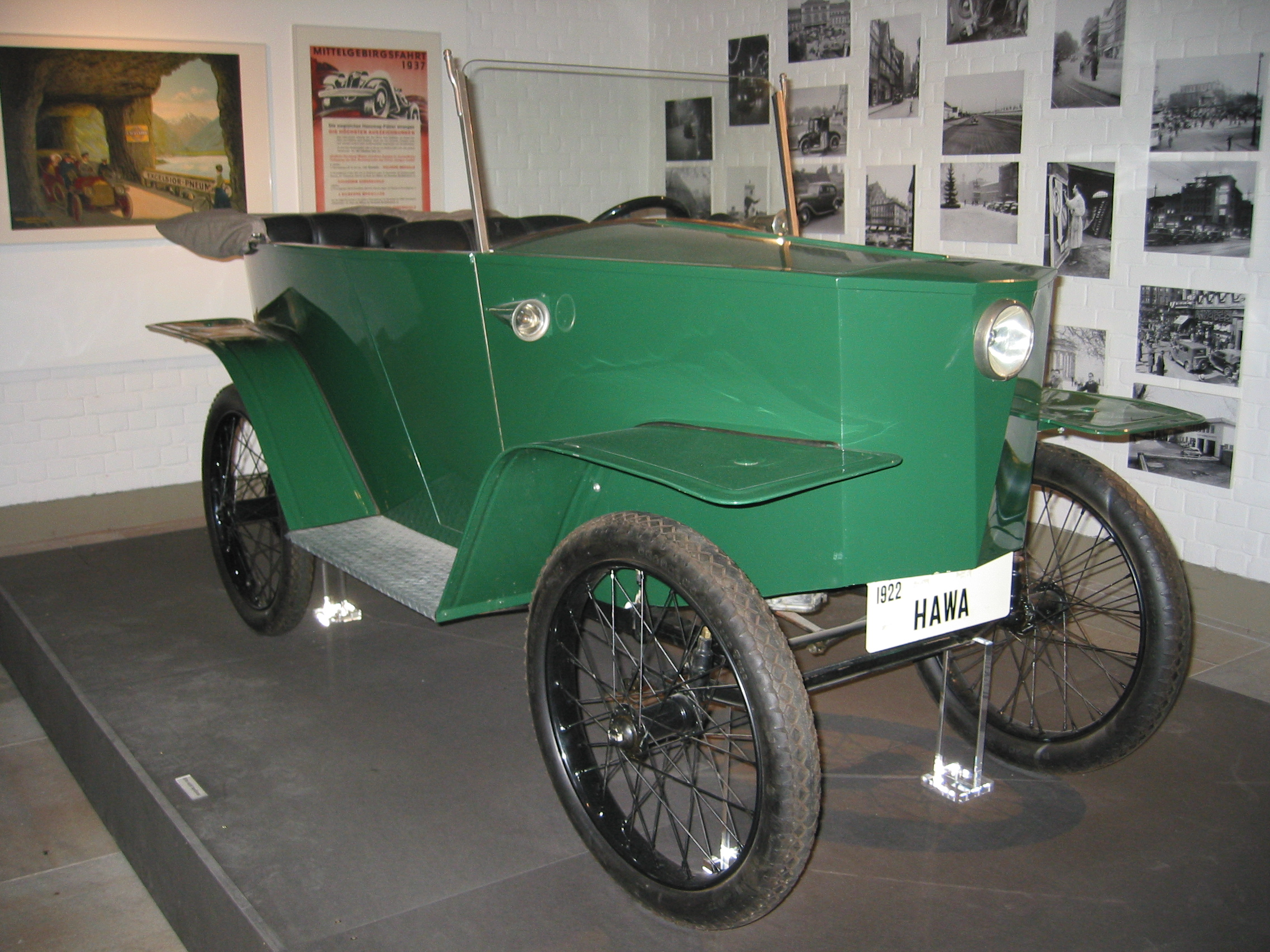
Hawa electric car 1922

The Hannoversche Waggonfabrik AG (Hawa) was founded in 1898 to build passenger and freight cars for Germany's railways. When the First World War began, Hannover built rolling stock for the German military, before gradually becoming more and more involved in the production of aircraft, starting with the manufacture of propellers in 1915 before moving on to repair work, and the license manufacture of aircraft by the end of the year. An important reason why Hannover, along with other railway manufacturers, was encouraged to move into aircraft work was that, not only did it have an extensive, well trained workforce, but also possessed large stocks of seasoned wood.

Hannover hired Hermann Dorner, formerly of DFW as chief designer in September 1917, with his first design being a two-seat fighter, the Hannover CL.II. This proved a great success, and was followed into production by the improved Hannover CL.III.

The further improved Hannover CL.V was in production at the end of the war, but while Hannover attempted to move into civil aircraft manufacture, the Treaty of Versailles suspended all aircraft manufacture and Hannover returned to its original business of railway stock manufacture.

== Aircraft ==
Production figures from

- Hannover C.I (licensed built Aviatik C.I) – 146
- Halberstadt D.II – 30
- Rumpler C.Ia – 375
- Hannover CL.II – 443
- Hannover CL.III – 180 CL.III, 611 CL.IIIa
- Hannover CL.IV – 5
- Hannover CL.V – 108
- Hannover F.3
- Hannover F.10 – 1
- Hannover Vampyr
