= Hannover CL.II =

World War One German Escort fighter aircraft

CL.II
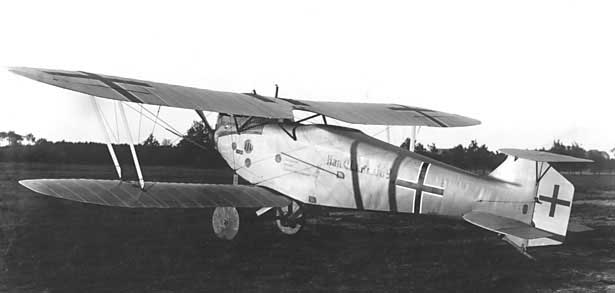

General information
- Type: Escort fighter
- National origin: Germany
- Manufacturer: Hannoversche Waggonfabrik
- Designer: Hermann Dorner
- Primary user: Luftstreitkräfte
- Number built: 439

History
- First flight: 1917

The Hannover CL.II was an escort fighter, produced in Germany during World War I, designed in response to a 1917 requirement by the Idflieg for such a machine to protect reconnaissance aircraft over enemy territory.

== Design and development ==
The CL.II was a compact biplane of largely conventional configuration with single-bay staggered wings of unequal span. The fuselage was a thin plywood paneled, wooden monocoque design, very similar to the style of fuselage in Robert Thelen's Albatros series of single-seat fighters.

The main units of the fixed tail skid undercarriage were linked by a cross-axle and the pilot and tail gunner sat in tandem, open cockpits, with the gunner's cockpit elevated above the line of the upper fuselage to afford him a greater field of fire. For the same purpose, the aircraft featured an unusually compact empennage, with a short fin integral with the rear fuselage structure and a biplane tail unit that allowed the rear gunner to have a larger field of fire aft when defending the aircraft. Smaller than the usual C-class reconnaissance aircraft, it was easy for enemy pilots to mistake it for a single-seat fighter; a mistake that would bring them into the line of fire of the rear facing observer when closing from astern.

The CL.II was also produced under licence by LFG, under the designation CL.IIa. The type was widely produced, and as the war continued, was increasingly employed as a ground attack machine, remaining in service in this role until the Armistice.

A copy of Hannover CL.II, named CWL SK-1 Słowik, was the first aircraft built in independent Poland, in CWL in Warsaw in 1919. It however crashed during a public flight on August 23, 1919 in Warsaw, due to faulty bracing wires, killing its constructor Karol Słowik.

== Specifications ==
Data from German Aircraft of the First World War

General characteristics

- Crew: 2
- Length: 7.58 m (24 ft 10 in)
- Wingspan: 11.7 m (38 ft 5 in)
- Height: 2.8 m (9 ft 2 in)
- Wing area: 32.7 m^{2} (352 sq ft)
- Empty weight: 717 kg (1,581 lb)
- Gross weight: 1,081 kg (2,383 lb)
- Powerplant: 1 × Argus As.III 6-cylinder water-cooled in-line piston engine, 134 kW (180 hp)
- Propellers: 2-bladed fixed-pitch propeller

Performance

- Maximum speed: 165 km/h (103 mph, 89 kn) at 5,000 m (16,000 ft)
- Endurance: 3 hours 30 minutes
- Service ceiling: 7,500 m (24,600 ft)
- Time to altitude: 5,000 m (16,000 ft) in 5 minutes 18 seconds

Armament

- Guns: :*1 × fixed, forward-firing 7.92 mm LMG 08/15 Spandau machine gun

- 1 × trainable, rearward-firing 7.92 mm Parabellum MG14 machine gun for observer

== Bibliography ==
- Gray, Peter & Thetford, Owen (1987) [1970]. German Aircraft of the First World War (2nd ed.). London: Putnam. ISBN 0-85177-809-7.
- Rimell, Ray & Woodman, Harry (2015). 'HAWA'! (Vol. 2). Windsock Datafile. Vol. 169. Berkhampstead, UK: Albatros Productions. ISBN 978-1-906798-44-4.
